= Southern Lakes Conference =

Wisconsin high school athletic conference

The Southern Lakes Conference is a high school athletic conference with its membership based in southeastern Wisconsin. Founded in 1953, the conference and its member schools are affiliated with the Wisconsin Interscholastic Athletic Association.

== History ==
=== 1953-1997 ===
Location of Original Southern Lakes Conference Members

The Southern Lakes Conference traces its origin to the break-up of the Southern Wisconsin and Northern Illinois (SWANI) Conference in 1952. The five Wisconsin-based schools in that conference (Burlington, Delavan, Elkhorn, Lake Geneva and Whitewater) entered into negotiations with three schools from the Southeastern Wisconsin Conference (East Troy, Mukwonago and Wilmot Union) to form a new eight-member league, which was eventually named the Southern Lakes Conference and began play in 1953. In 1958, Lake Geneva and Genoa City High Schools merged to form Badger High School, which took Lake Geneva's place in the conference. Big Foot High School in Walworth joined the Southern Lakes Conference in 1961, increasing membership to nine schools. A tenth school (Salem Central, now Westosha Central) joined in 1969, and the next year, membership increased to twelve with the addition of Union Grove and Waterford. All three of the new members previously played in the Southeastern Badger Conference, which was dissolved in 1970. To better facilitate scheduling and competition, the Southern Lakes Conference was split into Eastern and Western Divisions:

Eastern Division	Western Division
Burlington	Badger
Mukwonago	Big Foot
Salem Central	Delavan-Darien
Union Grove	East Troy
Waterford	Elkhorn
Wilmot	Whitewater

Location of Southern Lakes Conference Members (1982-1997)

In 1980, Mukwonago left to join the Parkland Conference as part of a major realignment of southeastern Wisconsin high schools. Big Foot followed them out of the conference two years later, and they were replaced by Jefferson and Milton, with Badger moving to the Eastern Division to keep divisions at six members each, an alignment that would remain in place until 1997:

Eastern Division	Western Division
Badger	Delavan-Darien
Burlington	East Troy
Salem Central	Elkhorn
Union Grove	Jefferson
Waterford	Milton
Wilmot	Whitewater

=== 1997-present ===
In 1997, all of the schools in the Eastern Division left the Southern Lakes Conference: Burlington joined the Southeast Conference, and the remaining schools formed the Lakeshore Conference along with St. Catherine's High School in Racine and St. Joseph High School in Kenosha. Fort Atkinson joined the Southern Lakes that same year to bring conference membership to seven schools in a single division. In 2008, the five public schools in the Lakeshore Conference (Badger, Union Grove, Waterford, Westosha Central and Wilmot) rejoined the Southern Lakes Conference. They replaced five schools that exited the conference: three joined the Rock Valley Conference (East Troy, Jefferson and Whitewater) and two joined the Badger Conference (Fort Atkinson and Milton). Burlington rejoined the Southern Lakes from the Southeast Conference the next year, and Beloit Memorial became the latest addition to the Southern Lakes when they joined in 2023 from the Big Eight Conference. They replaced Delavan-Darien, who left for the Rock Valley Conference that same year.

=== Football-only alignment ===
In February 2019, in conjunction with the Wisconsin Football Coaches Association, the WIAA released a sweeping football-only realignment for Wisconsin to commence with the 2020 football season and run on a two-year cycle. The Southern Lakes Conference began the 2020-2021 cycle with the same eight-member group as its full membership roster for football. The 2022-2023 realignment cycle brought changes to the Southern Lakes that would predate its non-football realignment by a year. Delavan-Darien moved over to the Rock Valley Conference, and Beloit Memorial joined from the Big Eight Conference. This alignment will be maintained through at least the 2026-2027 competition cycle.

== List of member schools ==
=== Current full members ===
School	Location	Affiliation	Enrollment	Mascot	Colors	Joined
Badger	Lake Geneva, WI	Public	1,217	Badgers		1958, 2008
Beloit Memorial	Beloit, WI	Public	1,248	Purple Knights		2023
Burlington	Burlington, WI	Public	950	Demons		1953, 2009
Elkhorn	Elkhorn, WI	Public	1,252	Elks		1953
Union Grove	Union Grove, WI	Public	1,050	Broncos		1970, 2008
Waterford	Waterford, WI	Public	906	Wolverines		1970, 2008
Westosha Central (Note: Known as Salem Central High School prior to 1976.)	Paddock Lake, WI	Public	1,336	Falcons		1969, 2008
Wilmot Union	Wilmot, WI	Public	844	Panthers		1953, 2008

=== Current associate members ===
School	Location	Affiliation	Mascot	Colors	Primary Conference	Sport(s)
Delavan-Darien	Delavan, WI	Public	Comets		Rock Valley	Boys Swim & Dive, Girls Swim & Dive
Edgerton	Edgerton, WI	Public	Crimson Tide		Rock Valley	Boys Swim & Dive, (Note: Co-operative with Evansville) Girls Swim & Dive
Jefferson	Jefferson, WI	Public	Eagles		Rock Valley	Gymnastics, (Note: Co-operative with Cambridge) Boys Swim & Dive, Girls Swim & Dive
Platteville	Platteville, WI	Public	Hillmen		Southwest Wisconsin	Boys Swim & Dive, (Note: Co-operative with Lancaster) Girls Swim & Dive
The Prairie School	Wind Point, WI	Private (Nonsectarian)	Hawks		Metro Classic	Boys Swim & Dive, Girls Swim & Dive (Note: Co-operative with St. Catherine's)
Whitewater	Whitewater, WI	Public	Whippets		Rock Valley	Gymnastics, Boys Swim & Dive, Girls Swim & Dive

=== Current co-operative members ===
Team	Colors	Host School	Co-operative Members	Sport(s)
BUW Gymnastics		Wilmot Union	Badger, Burlington, Union Grove, Williams Bay	Gymnastics

=== Former full members ===
School	Location	Affiliation	Mascot	Colors	Joined	Left	Conference Joined	Current Conference
Big Foot	Walworth, WI	Public	Chiefs		1961	1982	Rock Valley	
Delavan-Darien (Note: Known as Delavan High School prior to 1957.)	Delavan, WI	Public	Comets		1953	2023	Rock Valley	
East Troy	East Troy, WI	Public	Trojans		1953	2008	Rock Valley	
Fort Atkinson	Fort Atkinson, WI	Public	Blackhawks		1997	2008	Badger	
Jefferson	Jefferson, WI	Public	Eagles		1982	2008	Rock Valley	
Lake Geneva	Lake Geneva, WI	Public	Resorters		1953	1958	Merged with Genoa City High School	
Milton	Milton, WI	Public	Redhawks		1982	2008	Badger	
Mukwonago	Mukwonago, WI	Public	Indians		1953	1980	Parkland	Classic 8
Whitewater	Whitewater, WI	Public	Whippets		1953	2008	Rock Valley	Rock Valley

=== Former football-only members ===
School	Location	Affiliation	Mascot	Colors	Seasons	Conference Joined	Primary Conference
Beloit Memorial	Beloit, WI	Public	Purple Knights		2022	Southern Lakes	Big Eight

== Membership timeline ==
=== Full members ===
Eastern Division Western Division

=== Football members ===
Eastern Division Western Division

== Membership map ==
Southern Lakes Conference
Location of Southern Lakes Conference full members:
1 Badger
2 Beloit Memorial
3 Burlington
4 Elkhorn
5 Union Grove
6 Waterford
7 Westosha Central
8 Wilmot Union

== Sponsored sports ==
	Baseball	Boys Basketball	Girls Basketball	Boys Cross Country	Girls Cross Country	Football	Boys Golf	Girls Golf	Gymnastics	Boys Soccer	Girls Soccer	Softball	Boys Swim & Dive	Girls Swim & Dive	Boys Tennis	Girls Tennis	Boys Track & Field	Girls Track & Field	Boys Volleyball	Girls Volleyball	Boys Wrestling	Girls Wrestling
Badger	●	●	●	●	●	●	●	●		●	●	●	● (Note: Co-operative with Big Foot, Westosha Central, Williams Bay and Wilmot Union)	●	●	●	●	●		●	●	●
Beloit Memorial	●	●	●	●	●	●	●	●		●	●	● (Note: Co-operative with The Lincoln Academy)	●	●	●	●	●	●	●	●	●	●
Burlington	●	●	●	●	●	●	●	●		●	●	●	● (Note: Co-operative with Catholic Central, East Troy, Union Grove and Waterford)	●	●	●	●	●	●	●	●	●
Elkhorn	●	●	●	●	●	●	●	●	●	●	●	●	●	●	●	●	●	●		●	●	●
Union Grove	●	●	●	●	●	●	●	●		●	●	●			●	●	●	●	●	●	●	●
Waterford	●	●	●	●	●	●	●	●	●	●	●	●			●	●	●	●	●	●	●	●
Westosha Central	●	●	●	●	●	●	●	●		●	●	●			●	●	●	●	●	●	●	●
Wilmot Union	●	●	●	●	●	●	●	●	● (Note: BUW Gymnastics co-operative)	● (Note: Co-operative with Catholic Central)	● (Note: Co-operative with Catholic Central)	●			●	●	●	●	●	●	●	●

== List of state champions ==
=== Fall sports ===
Boys Cross Country
School	Year	Division
Mukwonago	1964	Small Schools
Burlington	1965	Small Schools
Mukwonago	1966	Small Schools
Whitewater	1987	Class B
Whitewater	1993	Division 2
Whitewater	1994	Division 2
Whitewater	1995	Division 2

Football
School	Year	Division
Whitewater	1980	Division 2
Milton	1986	Division 3
Milton	1989	Division 3
Jefferson	1991	Division 3
Badger	2023	Division 2

Girls Golf
School	Year	Division
Westosha Central	2021	Division 1
Westosha Central	2022	Division 1

Boys Soccer
School	Year	Division
Union Grove	2023	Division 2

Girls Volleyball
School	Year	Division
Westosha Central	1989	Class A
Westosha Central	1992	Division 2

=== Winter sports ===
Boys Basketball
School	Year	Division
Elkhorn	1978	Class B
Elkhorn	1979	Class B
Wilmot Union	1984	Class B
Wilmot Union	1991	Division 2

Girls Basketball
School	Year	Division
Waterford	1985	Class B
Elkhorn	1997	Division 2

Gymnastics
School	Year	Division
Waterford	1991	Division 2
Union Grove/ Williams Bay/ Wilmot Union	2021	Division 1
Elkhorn	2024	Division 2

Boys Wrestling
School	Year	Division
East Troy	1986	Class B
East Troy	1987	Class B
East Troy	1988	Class B

=== Spring sports ===
Baseball
School	Year	Division
Wilmot Union	1970	Single Division
Whitewater	1995	Division 2
Whitewater	1999	Division 2

Boys Golf
School	Year	Division
Badger	1994	Division 1

Softball
School	Year	Division
Burlington	1984	Class A
Union Grove	2011	Division 2
Westosha Central	2013	Division 1
Westosha Central	2015	Division 1

Boys Track & Field
School	Year	Division
Elkhorn	1958	Class B
Mukwonago	1962	Class B
Whitewater	1970	Class B
Whitewater	1971	Class B
Whitewater	1973	Class B
Whitewater	1978	Class B

== List of conference champions ==
=== Boys Basketball ===
School	Quantity	Years
Burlington	20	1956, 1957, 1966, 1969, 1971, 1972, 1973, 1974, 1976, 1977, 1979, 1980, 1988, 1989, 1995, 1997, 2011, 2012, 2013, 2024
Whitewater	15	1961, 1964, 1970, 1972, 1973, 1977, 1978, 1979, 1986, 1988, 1990, 1992, 1993, 1994, 1995
Elkhorn	14	1958, 1959, 1962, 1975, 1976, 1977, 1983, 1999, 2003, 2004, 2005, 2006, 2009, 2020
Westosha Central	12	1982, 1985, 1989, 1995, 1996, 2016, 2017, 2019, 2020, 2021, 2022, 2023
Badger	10	1966, 1968, 1971, 1976, 1981, 1982, 1987, 1988, 1993, 2015
East Troy	10	1960, 1963, 1967, 1989, 1990, 1996, 1997, 2000, 2007, 2008
Delavan-Darien	7	1974, 1980, 1987, 1988, 1991, 2000, 2004
Waterford	7	1981, 1986, 1995, 1996, 2010, 2025, 2026
Wilmot Union	6	1984, 1990, 1991, 1992, 1994, 1995
Mukwonago	3	1965, 1975, 1978
Union Grove	3	1983, 2014, 2018
Fort Atkinson	2	2001, 2002
Milton	2	1983, 2006
Lake Geneva	2	1954, 1955
Beloit Memorial	1	2026
Jefferson	1	1998
Big Foot	0	

=== Girls Basketball ===
School	Quantity	Years
Union Grove	12	2010, 2011, 2015, 2016, 2017, 2018, 2020, 2021, 2022, 2023, 2024, 2025
Jefferson	11	1987, 1988, 1989, 1990, 1991, 1993, 1994, 1995, 2002, 2005, 2007
Waterford	11	1981, 1982, 1983, 1984, 1985, 1986, 1987, 1990, 1992, 2015, 2019
Delavan-Darien	8	1979, 1980, 1982, 1983, 1985, 2008, 2009, 2010
Elkhorn	6	1996, 1997, 2003, 2004, 2006, 2026
Westosha Central	6	1980, 1981, 1982, 1995, 1996, 1997
Wilmot Union	6	1993, 1994, 1995, 2013, 2014, 2016
Milton	5	1986, 1992, 1993, 1998, 1999
Badger	4	1989, 1992, 2012, 2020
Fort Atkinson	3	1998, 2000, 2001
Whitewater	3	1983, 1984, 2008
Burlington	2	1988, 1991
Mukwonago	2	1978, 1979
East Troy	1	1981
Beloit Memorial	0	
Big Foot	0	

=== Football ===
School	Quantity	Years
Burlington	26	1968, 1969, 1970, 1971, 1972, 1973, 1975, 1976, 1977, 1979, 1981, 1982, 1983, 1984, 1986, 1987, 1988, 1989, 1990, 1991, 1992, 1993, 1994, 1995, 1996, 2014
Whitewater	16	1956, 1960, 1962, 1964, 1965, 1972, 1973, 1974, 1977, 1978, 1980, 1981, 1983, 1987, 1993, 1999
Badger	13	1960, 1989, 1990, 1992, 2011, 2013, 2015, 2016, 2017, 2022, 2023, 2024, 2025
Delavan-Darien	11	1958, 1961, 1962, 1963, 1967, 1982, 1983, 1988, 1999, 2004, 2010
Elkhorn	11	1974, 1976, 1984, 1994, 1995, 1996, 1998, 1999, 2004, 2007, 2014
Milton	11	1985, 1986, 1989, 1990, 1995, 2001, 2002, 2004, 2005, 2006, 2007
Waterford	10	1980, 2008, 2009, 2011, 2012, 2013, 2014, 2015, 2018, 2019
Wilmot Union	9	1954, 1955, 1966, 1978, 1985, 2011, 2013, 2014, 2019
East Troy	5	1959, 1978, 1979, 1989, 1992
Big Foot	3	1970, 1971, 1975
Mukwonago	3	1954, 1957, 1972
Union Grove	3	2008, 2021, 2026
Westosha Central	3	1985, 1989, 1992
Fort Atkinson	2	2000, 2003
Jefferson	2	1991, 1997
Lake Geneva	1	1953
Beloit Memorial	0	
