= Lower Fox Conference =

Wisconsin high school football conference (1933-1936)

The Lower Fox Conference is a former high school football conference with its membership concentrated in the lower Fox River valley in southeastern Wisconsin. Founded in 1933 and playing its last season in 1936, the conference's member schools belonged to the Wisconsin Interscholastic Athletic Association.

== History ==
Location of Lower Fox Conference Members (1934-1936)

The Lower Fox Conference was formed in 1933 by five small high schools in southeastern Wisconsin: East Troy, Mukwonago, Racine County Agricultural, Waterford and Wilmot Union. All original members with the exception of East Troy belonged to the Southeastern Wisconsin Conference for other sports, which did not sponsor football at that time. Fellow SEC members Union Grove and Williams Bay joined in 1934, and the conference maintained its seven-member lineup until its last season was played in 1936. The Southeastern Wisconsin Conference began sponsorship of football in the 1937 season, with six of the seven members of the Lower Fox Conference becoming members. Williams Bay, the only holdout, transitioned to six-man football and joined the Southern Regional Conference along with Clinton and Darien.

== Conference membership history ==
School	Location	Affiliation	Mascot	Colors	Seasons	Conference Joined	Primary Conference
East Troy	East Troy, WI	Public	Trojans		1933–1936	Southeastern Wisconsin	Independent
Mukwonago	Mukwonago, WI	Public	Indians		1933-1936	Southeastern Wisconsin	Southeastern Wisconsin
Racine County Agricultural	Rochester, WI	Public	Aggies		1933–1936	Southeastern Wisconsin	Southeastern Wisconsin
Waterford	Waterford, WI	Public	Wolverines		1933–1936	Southeastern Wisconsin	Southeastern Wisconsin
Wilmot Union	Wilmot, WI	Public	Panthers		1933–1936	Southeastern Wisconsin	Southeastern Wisconsin
Union Grove	Union Grove, WI	Public	Broncos		1934–1936	Southeastern Wisconsin	Southeastern Wisconsin
Williams Bay	Williams Bay, WI	Public	Bulldogs		1934–1936	Southern Regional	Southeastern Wisconsin

== List of conference champions ==
School	Quantity	Years
Mukwonago	3	1933, 1934, 1936
Waterford	1	1935
East Troy	0	
Rochester Aggies	0	
Wilmot Union	0	
Union Grove	0	
Williams Bay	0	
