= Southeastern Wisconsin Conference =

Wisconsin high school athletic conference (1928-1963)

The Southeastern Wisconsin Conference is a former high school athletic conference in Wisconsin, operating from 1928 to 1963. All but one of its member schools belonged to the Wisconsin Interscholastic Athletic Association.

== History ==
=== 1929–1953 ===
Location of Original Southeastern Wisconsin Conference Members
Location of Southeastern Wisconsin Conference Members (1934-1935)

The Southeastern Wisconsin Conference was formed for the 1928-29 school year by six high schools in southeastern Wisconsin: Clinton, Genoa City, Palmyra, Waterford, Williams Bay and Wilmot Union. These were smaller schools than those in the Southern Five Conference, which covered roughly the same geographical area. In 1930, Union Grove and Walworth joined the conference, and with Palmyra's departure the conference now had seven members. Palmyra rejoined the conference in 1932, and overall membership expanded to ten with the addition of Darien and Norris Foundation in Mukwonago. Mukwonago and Racine County Agricultural in Rochester joined the Southeastern in 1934, and the league subdivided into Eastern and Western Sections of six schools each:

| Eastern Section | Western Section |
|---|---|
| Mukwonago | Clinton |
| Norris Foundation | Darien |
| Rochester Aggies | Genoa City |
| Union Grove | Palmyra |
| Waterford | Walworth |
| Wilmot Union | Williams Bay |

Walworth left to join the Southern Five Conference in 1935, with Palmyra leaving a year later and Wilmot moving to the conference's Western Section. In 1937, Clinton, Darien, Genoa City and Williams Bay would leave the Southeastern to form the Southern Regional Conference along with Capron (now North Boone) High School in Illinois. East Troy joined the remaining six schools in the Southeastern to create a seven-member circuit for the 1937-38 school year. The Southeastern Wisconsin Conference began sponsorship of football that season, with six of the seven members coming over from the disbanded Lower Fox Conference, a football-only circuit that had been in existence since 1933. Membership would continue in this configuration for sixteen years (with Walworth joining as a football-only member in 1947) before East Troy, Mukwonago and Wilmot left to join the new Southern Lakes Conference in 1953. They were replaced by Hartland, Pewaukee and Slinger, who were left without a conference after the dissolution of the 4-C Conference.

=== 1953–1963 ===
Location of Southeastern Wisconsin Conference Members (1953-1956)
Location of Final Southeastern Wisconsin Conference Members

The far-flung geographic footprint of conference membership ushered in a volatile period of changes during the Southeastern Wisconsin Conference's final decade. Hartland High School was closed in 1956 and replaced by Arrowhead High School, who took Hartland's place in the conference. Slinger left to join the new Scenic Moraine Conference in 1958, and they were replaced by three returning members and one newcomer. Big Foot, Clinton and Palmyra were left without a conference after consolidation and closings whittled away membership of the Southern Regional Conference, and they rejoined the Southeastern in 1958. That same year, Salem Central (now Westosha Central) High School joined the Southeastern after dealing with their own issues with long travel distances as members of the Braveland Conference. In 1959, the Southeastern lost three schools: Arrowhead to the Little Ten, Pewaukee to the Scenic Moraine, and Racine County Agricultural to the school's closing. Pewaukee remained in the Southeastern as a football-only member for the 1959 season before their full membership in the Scenic Moraine started with the winter sports season. Williams Bay rejoined the conference that year after leaving the Southern Wisconsin Private Schools (SWAPS) Conference to bring membership to eight schools. Two years later, Big Foot left to join the Southern Lakes Conference, and their place was taken by St. Mary's (now Catholic Central) High School in Burlington, the only private school ever to play in the conference.

=== Epilogue ===
The Southeastern Conference ended operations in 1963. Four of its members (Salem Central, St. Mary's, Union Grove and Waterford) formed the new Southeastern Badger Conference, while the other four (Clinton, Norris Foundation, Palmyra and Williams Bay) joined with Northwestern Military and Naval Academy in Lake Geneva and Wisconsin School for the Deaf in Delavan to form the Indian Trails Conference.

== Conference membership history ==
=== Final members ===
| School | Location | Affiliation | Mascot | Colors | Joined | Left | Conference Joined | Current Conference |
|---|---|---|---|---|---|---|---|---|
| Clinton | Clinton, WI | Public | Cougars | | 1928, 1958 | 1937, 1963 | Southern Regional, Indian Trails | Rock Valley |
| Norris Foundation | Mukwonago, WI | Public, Alternative | Nors'men | | 1932 | 1963 | Indian Trails | Dropped interscholastic athletics in 1982 |
| Palmyra | Palmyra, WI | Public | Panthers | | 1928, 1958 | 1936, 1963 | Independent, Indian Trails | Trailways |
| Salem Central | Paddock Lake, WI | Public | Falcons | | 1958 | 1963 | Southeastern Badger | Southern Lakes |
| St. Mary's | Burlington, WI | Private (Catholic) | Hilltoppers | | 1961 | 1963 | Southeastern Badger | Midwest Classic |
| Union Grove | Union Grove, WI | Public | Broncos | | 1930 | 1963 | Southeastern Badger | Southern Lakes |
| Waterford | Waterford, WI | Public | Wolverines | | 1928 | 1963 | Southeastern Badger | Southern Lakes |
| Williams Bay | Williams Bay, WI | Public | Bulldogs | | 1928, 1959 | 1937, 1963 | Southern Regional, Indian Trails | Trailways |

=== Previous members ===
| School | Location | Affiliation | Mascot | Colors | Joined | Left | Conference Joined | Current Conference |
|---|---|---|---|---|---|---|---|---|
| Arrowhead | Hartland, WI | Public | Warhawks | | 1956 | 1959 | Little Ten | Classic 8 |
| Big Foot | Walworth, WI | Public | Chiefs | | 1958 | 1961 | Southern Lakes | Rock Valley |
| Darien | Darien, WI | Public | Golden Eagles | | 1932 | 1937 | Southern Regional | Closed in 1957 (consolidated into Delavan-Darien) |
| East Troy | East Troy, WI | Public | Trojans | | 1937 | 1953 | Southern Lakes | Rock Valley |
| Genoa City | Genoa City, WI | Public | Orioles | | 1928 | 1937 | Southern Regional | Closed in 1958 (consolidated into Badger) |
| Hartland | Hartland, WI | Public | Trojans | | 1953 | 1956 | Closed in 1956 | |
| Mukwonago | Mukwonago, WI | Public | Indians | | 1934 | 1953 | Southern Lakes | Classic 8 |
| Pewaukee | Pewaukee, WI | Public | Pirates | | 1953 | 1959 | Scenic Moraine | Woodland |
| Racine County Agricultural | Rochester, WI | Public | Aggies | | 1934 | 1959 | Closed in 1959 | |
| Slinger | Slinger, WI | Public | Owls | | 1953 | 1958 | Scenic Moraine | North Shore |
| Walworth | Walworth, WI | Public | Warriors | | 1930 | 1935 | Independent | Closed in 1958 (consolidated into Big Foot) |
| Wilmot Union | Wilmot, WI | Public | Panthers | | 1928 | 1953 | Southern Lakes | Southern Lakes |

=== Football-only members ===
| School | Location | Affiliation | Mascot | Colors | Seasons | Primary Conference |
|---|---|---|---|---|---|---|
| Pewaukee | Pewaukee, WI | Public | Pirates | | 1959 | Scenic Moraine |
| Walworth | Walworth, WI | Public | Warriors | | 1947-1957 | Southern Regional |

== Membership timeline ==
=== Full members ===
Eastern Section Western Section

== List of conference champions ==
=== Boys Basketball ===
| School | Quantity | Years |
|---|---|---|
| Rochester Aggies | 11 | 1935, 1939, 1940, 1941, 1942, 1946, 1950, 1952, 1954, 1955, 1957 |
| Wilmot Union | 8 | 1932, 1933, 1943, 1944, 1947, 1948, 1950, 1951 |
| Waterford | 6 | 1929, 1930, 1932, 1944, 1945, 1963 |
| Salem Central | 4 | 1960, 1961, 1962, 1963 |
| Arrowhead | 3 | 1957, 1958, 1959 |
| Mukwonago | 3 | 1951, 1952, 1953 |
| Union Grove | 3 | 1934, 1935, 1945 |
| Big Foot | 2 | 1960, 1961 |
| Clinton | 2 | 1936, 1937 |
| East Troy | 1 | 1949 |
| Hartland | 1 | 1956 |
| Norris Foundation | 1 | 1935 |
| Walworth | 1 | 1935 |
| Darien | 0 | |
| Genoa City | 0 | |
| Palmyra | 0 | |
| Pewaukee | 0 | |
| Slinger | 0 | |
| St. Mary's | 0 | |
| Williams Bay | 0 | |
Champions from 1931, 1936 (Eastern Section) and 1938 unknown

=== Football ===
| School | Quantity | Years |
|---|---|---|
| Waterford | 9 | 1938, 1939, 1943, 1944, 1955, 1957, 1959, 1960, 1962 |
| Rochester Aggies | 7 | 1937, 1938, 1940, 1941, 1943, 1953, 1956 |
| Wilmot Union | 4 | 1940, 1946, 1947, 1949 |
| Mukwonago | 3 | 1950, 1951, 1952 |
| Union Grove | 3 | 1948, 1954, 1961 |
| East Troy | 2 | 1945, 1948 |
| Arrowhead | 1 | 1958 |
| Big Foot | 0 | |
| Clinton | 0 | |
| Hartland | 0 | |
| Norris Foundation | 0 | |
| Pewaukee | 0 | |
| Salem Central | 0 | |
| Slinger | 0 | |
| St. Mary's | 0 | |
| Walworth | 0 | |
