= Southern Dairyland Conference =

Wisconsin high school football conference (1959-1962)

The Southern Dairyland Conference is a high school athletic conference with its membership concentrated in south central Wisconsin. Football was the only sport sponsored by this conference, which was founded in 1959 and disbanded after the 1962 football season. All conference members were affiliated with the Wisconsin Interscholastic Athletic Association.

== History ==
Location of Final Southern Dairyland Conference Members

The Southern Dairyland Conference, also known by its official title of the Dairyland High School Football Conference, was formed by four high schools in the Madison metropolitan area in November 1958: Deerfield, Johnson Creek, Marshall and Palmyra. It became known as the Southern Dairyland in the local media to avoid confusion with an all-sport circuit called the Dairyland Conference that was inaugurated that same year in western Wisconsin. Three members of the new conference (Deerfield, Marshall and Palmyra) were previously members of the Southern Regional Conference, which sponsored eight-man football before it was disbanded after the 1958 football season. All three schools made the decision to transition to eleven-man football for the 1959 season. They were joined by Johnson Creek, a school that already sponsored eleven-man football and were members of the Madison Suburban Conference. Norris Foundation in Mukwonago and Williams Bay joined the conference for the 1960 season when they also moved to eleven-man football and were in search of affiliation. The conference's membership roster was completed in 1961, when Wisconsin School for the Deaf in Delavan joined the loop. Competition lasted until the 1962 season, when four schools (Norris Farm, Palmyra, Williams Bay and Wisconsin School for the Deaf) formed the Indian Trails Conference (along with Clinton and Northwestern Military & Naval Academy), which began competition in fall 1963. The other three former Southern Dairyland members (Deerfield, Johnson Creek and Marshall) joined the Madison Suburban Conference for the 1963 football season, a conference that they were already affiliated with for their other interscholastic sports.

== Conference membership history ==
School	Location	Affiliation	Mascot	Colors	Seasons	Conference Joined	Primary Conference
Deerfield	Deerfield, WI	Public	Demons		1959–1962	Madison Suburban	Madison Suburban
Johnson Creek	Johnson Creek, WI	Public	Bluejays		1959–1962	Madison Suburban	Madison Suburban
Marshall	Marshall, WI	Public	Cardinals		1959–1962	Madison Suburban	Madison Suburban
Palmyra	Palmyra, WI	Public	Panthers		1959–1962	Indian Trails	Southeastern Wisconsin
Norris Foundation	Mukwonago, WI	Public, Alternative	Nors'men		1960–1962	Indian Trails	Southeastern Wisconsin
Williams Bay	Williams Bay, WI	Public	Bulldogs		1960–1962	Indian Trails	Southeastern Wisconsin
Wisconsin School for the Deaf	Delavan, WI	Public, Special Needs	Firebirds		1961–1962	Indian Trails	Independent

== List of conference champions ==
School	Quantity	Years
Marshall	2	1961, 1962
Deerfield	1	1959
Johnson Creek	1	1960
Norris Foundation	0	
Palmyra	0	
Williams Bay	0	
Wisconsin School for the Deaf	0	
