= Rock Valley Conference =

Wisconsin high school athletic conference

The Rock Valley Conference is a high school athletic conference in Wisconsin, originally formed as the Central Suburban Conference in 1969. All member schools belong to the Wisconsin Interscholastic Athletic Association and are concentrated in the Rock River Valley in south central Wisconsin.

== History ==
=== 1969-1977 ===
Location of Central Suburban Conference Members (1970-1977)

The Rock Valley Conference was formed in 1969 as the Central Suburban Conference. Its original membership consisted of four members from the Central Section of the disbanded Madison Suburban Conference (Evansville, Lake Mills, Milton and Oregon) along with newcomers Clinton (from the Indian Trails Conference) and Turner (from the IHSA's SHARK Conference). Columbus and Parkview joined the following season from the Little Ten Conference and State Line League, respectively. The Central Suburban Conference maintained this membership roster for the rest of its eight-year history.

=== 1977-2008 ===
In 1977, Columbus and Lake Mills left to join the Capitol Conference and Oregon left to join the Badger Conference. They were replaced by two schools from the Badger Conference (Edgerton and Jefferson) and one from the State Line League (Brodhead). That same year, the Central Suburban Conference changed its name to the Rock Valley Conference, both a reference to the old Rock River Valley League and the revised catchment area. In 1982, Jefferson and Milton both left the Rock Valley to join the Southern Lakes Conference and were replaced by Beloit Catholic (from the IHSA's Trailblazer Conference) and Big Foot (formerly of the Southern Lakes). Palmyra-Eagle joined the conference in 1990 to bring membership up to nine schools. Beloit Catholic left to join the Indian Trails Conference in 1996 for its last few years before it closed in 2000.

=== 2008-present ===
Membership remained unchanged until 2008 when the conference added four schools. Jefferson made its return from the Southern Lakes Conference, and three newcomers joined: two from the Southern Lakes (East Troy and Whitewater) and one from the Badger Conference (McFarland). The conference also split its membership into North and South Divisions:

North Division	South Division
East Troy	Big Foot
Edgerton	Brodhead
Evansville	Clinton
Jefferson	Palmyra-Eagle
McFarland	Parkview
Whitewater	Turner

This alignment lasted until 2017, when both Palmyra-Eagle and Parkview left the Rock Valley to join more similarly-sized schools in the Trailways Conference. McFarland and Monroe swapped conference affiliations in 2023, with Monroe joining the Rock Valley and McFarland taking their place in the Badger Conference. Delavan-Darien was also welcomed into the Rock Valley from the Southern Lakes Conference that year, and the conference subdivided into the current "Rock" and "Valley" Divisions:

Rock Division	Valley Division
Big Foot	Delavan-Darien
Brodhead	East Troy
Clinton	Jefferson
Edgerton	Monroe
Evansville	Whitewater
Turner	

=== Football-only alignment ===
In February 2019, in conjunction with the Wisconsin Football Coaches Association, the WIAA released a sweeping football-only realignment for Wisconsin to commence with the 2020 football season and run on a two-year cycle. The Rock Valley Conference entered the 2020 football season with eight members: East Troy, Edgerton, Edgewood, Evansville, Jefferson, McFarland, Monroe and Whitewater. Six members had full affiliation with the Rock Valley Conference with the exception of Edgewood and Monroe, who had primary affiliation with the Badger Conference. In 2022, Edgewood left to join the Capitol Conference as a football-only member with Delavan-Darien moving over from the Southern Lakes Conference as their replacement. Delavan-Darien played as a football-only member in the 2022 season before gaining full affiliation in the Rock Valley Conference the following year. The Rock Valley Conference will maintain its current football alignment until the 2026-2027 realignment cycle. Membership will decrease to seven schools after a complete overhaul, with two schools each joining the Badger Conference (McFarland and Monroe) and Capitol Conference (Edgerton and Jefferson). They will be replaced by full members Big Foot, Clinton and Turner, all making their return from associate membership in the Capitol Conference.

== List of member schools ==
=== Current full members ===
School	Location	Affiliation	Enrollment	Mascot	Colors	Joined	Division
Big Foot	Walworth, WI	Public	426	Chiefs		1982	Rock
Brodhead	Brodhead, WI	Public	306	Cardinals		1977	Rock
Clinton	Clinton, WI	Public	299	Cougars		1969	Rock
Delavan-Darien	Delavan, WI	Public	600	Comets		2023	Valley
East Troy	East Troy, WI	Public	417	Trojans		2008	Valley
Edgerton	Edgerton, WI	Public	538	Crimson Tide		1977	Rock
Evansville	Evansville, WI	Public	466	Blue Devils		1969	Rock
Jefferson	Jefferson, WI	Public	566	Eagles		1977, 2008	Valley
Monroe	Monroe, WI	Public	676	Cheesemakers		2023	Valley
Turner	Beloit, WI	Public	476	Trojans		1969	Rock
Whitewater	Whitewater, WI	Public	591	Whippets		2008	Valley

=== Current associate members ===
School	Location	Affiliation	Mascot	Colors	Primary Conference	Sport(s)
Cambridge	Cambridge, WI	Public	Bluejays		Capitol	Girls Golf
Lakeside Lutheran	Lake Mills, WI	Private (WELS)	Warriors		Capitol	Girls Golf
Luther Prep	Watertown, WI	Private (WELS)	Phoenix		Midwest Classic	Boys Tennis

=== Future associate members ===
School	Location	Affiliation	Mascot	Colors	Joining	Sport(s)	Primary Conference
Parkview	Orfordville, WI	Public	Vikings		2027	Girls Golf	Trailways

=== Former full members ===
School	Location	Affiliation	Mascot	Colors	Joined	Left	Conference Joined	Current Conference
Beloit Catholic	Beloit, WI	Private (Catholic)	Crusaders		1982	1996	Indian Trails	Closed in 2000
Columbus	Columbus, WI	Public	Cardinals		1970	1977	Capitol	
Lake Mills	Lake Mills, WI	Public	L-Cats		1969	1977	Capitol	
McFarland	McFarland, WI	Public	Spartans		2008	2023	Badger	
Milton	Milton, WI	Public	Redhawks		1969	1982	Southern Lakes	Badger
Oregon	Oregon, WI	Public	Panthers		1969	1977	Badger	
Palmyra-Eagle	Palmyra, WI	Public	Panthers		1990	2017	Trailways	
Parkview	Orfordville, WI	Public	Vikings		1970	2017	Trailways	

=== Former football-only members ===
School	Location	Affiliation	Mascot	Colors	Seasons	Conference Joined	Current Conference
Edgewood	Madison, WI	Private (Catholic)	Crusaders		2020-2021	Capitol	Badger

== Membership timeline ==
=== Full members ===
North Division South Division Rock Division Valley Division

=== Football members ===
North Division South Division

== Membership map ==
Location of Rock Valley Conference full members:
1 Big Foot
2 Brodhead
3 Clinton
4 Delavan-Darien
5 East Troy
6 Edgerton
7 Evansville
8 Jefferson
9 Monroe
10 Turner
11 Whitewater

== Sponsored sports ==
	Baseball	Boys Basketball	Girls Basketball	Boys Cross Country	Girls Cross Country	Football	Boys Golf	Girls Golf	Boys Soccer	Girls Soccer	Softball	Boys Tennis	Girls Tennis	Boys Track & Field	Girls Track & Field	Girls Volleyball	Boys Wrestling	Girls Wrestling
Big Foot	●	●	●	● (Note: Co-operative with Williams Bay)	●	●	●	●	●	●	●	● (Note: Co-operative with Williams Bay and Faith Christian)	●	●	●	●	●	●
Brodhead	● (Note: Co-operative with Juda)	●	●	●	●		●				●			●	●	●	●	●
Clinton	●	●	●	●	●	●	●	●		● (Note: Co-operative with Turner)	●			●	●	●	●	●
Delavan-Darien	●	●	●	●	●	●	●	●	●	●	●	●	●	●	●	●	●	●
East Troy	●	●	●	●	●	●	●	●	●	●	●	●	●	●	●	●	●	●
Edgerton	●	●	●	●	●		●	●	●	●	●	●	●	●	●	●	●	●
Evansville	●	●	●	●	●	●	●	●	●	●	●			●	●	●	●	●
Jefferson	●	●	●	●	●		●	●	●	●	●	●	●	●	●	●	●	●
Monroe	●	●	●	●	●		●		●	●	●	●	●	●	●	●	●	●
Turner	●	●	●	●	●	●	●	●			●			●	●	●	●	●
Whitewater	●	●	●	●	●	●	●		●	● (Note: Co-operative with Palmyra-Eagle)	●	●	●	●	●	●	●	●

== List of state champions ==
=== Fall sports ===
Boys Cross Country
School	Year	Division
Turner	1976	Class B
Clinton	1983	Class B
Clinton	1985	Class B
Clinton	1986	Class B

Girls Cross Country
School	Year	Division
East Troy	2016	Division 2

Football
School	Year	Division
Turner	1988	Division 4
Big Foot	2009	Division 4
Monroe	2022	Division 3

Boys Soccer
School	Year	Division
McFarland	2020-21	Alternate Season

Girls Volleyball
School	Year	Division
East Troy	2013	Division 2
East Troy	2018	Division 2

=== Winter sports ===
Girls Basketball
School	Year	Division
Clinton	2003	Division 3
Whitewater	2015	Division 3

Boys Swimming & Diving
School	Year	Division
McFarland	2009	Division 2
McFarland	2010	Division 2
McFarland	2011	Division 2
McFarland	2012	Division 2

Boys Wrestling
School	Year	Division
East Troy	1986	Class B
East Troy	1987	Class B
East Troy	1988	Class B
Evansville	2026	Division 2

=== Spring sports ===
Baseball
School	Year	Division
Edgerton	1990	Class B
Turner	2001	Division 2
Jefferson	2014	Division 2

Boys Golf
School	Year	Division
Edgerton	2012	Division 2

Girls Soccer
School	Year	Division
McFarland	2021	Division 3

Softball
School	Year	Division
Brodhead	2004	Division 3
Brodhead	2023	Division 3

Boys Track & Field
School	Year	Division
Parkview	1979	Class B
Parkview	1980	Class B
Turner	1987	Class B
Brodhead	1994	Division 2
Brodhead	1995	Division 2
Brodhead	2003	Division 2
Whitewater	2010	Division 2
Jefferson	2021	Division 2

Girls Track & Field
School	Year	Division
Lake Mills	1974	Class B
East Troy	2013	Division 2
Jefferson	2016	Division 2

== List of conference champions ==
=== Boys Basketball ===
School	Quantity	Years
Evansville	13	1970, 1993, 1994, 1995, 1997, 1998, 1999, 2001, 2003, 2006, 2007, 2008, 2017
Edgerton	12	1978, 1983, 1984, 1985, 1990, 1991, 2004, 2008, 2014, 2024, 2025, 2026
East Troy	10	2009, 2010, 2011, 2012, 2013, 2016, 2018, 2019, 2020, 2026
Brodhead	8	1978, 1986, 1987, 1999, 2000, 2005, 2009, 2022
Turner	7	1972, 2002, 2015, 2016, 2017, 2024, 2026
Clinton	6	1988, 1992, 1996, 2011, 2012, 2013
Milton	5	1971, 1974, 1975, 1976, 1982
Big Foot	4	1989, 1999, 2009, 2010
Jefferson	3	1979, 1980, 1981
Columbus	2	1973, 1977
McFarland	2	2015, 2023
Monroe	2	2024, 2025
Parkview	2	2003, 2014
Beloit Catholic	0	
Delavan-Darien	0	
Lake Mills	0	
Oregon	0	
Palmyra-Eagle	0	
Whitewater	0	

=== Girls Basketball ===
School	Quantity	Years
Clinton	16	1976, 1986, 1988, 1989, 1991, 1992, 1993, 1994, 1995, 1996, 1997, 2000, 2001, 2002, 2003, 2004
Brodhead	10	2002, 2008, 2009, 2011, 2012, 2013, 2014, 2015, 2016, 2022
Parkview	6	1987, 1990, 2002, 2008, 2009, 2010
Whitewater	6	2012, 2014, 2015, 2016, 2017, 2024
Evansville	5	1983, 2002, 2003, 2007, 2020
Big Foot	4	2005, 2006, 2016, 2017
Edgerton	4	2011, 2024, 2025, 2026
Jefferson	4	1982, 2009, 2018, 2026
McFarland	4	2010, 2014, 2019, 2023
East Troy	3	2012, 2013, 2025
Palmyra-Eagle	2	1998, 1999
Milton	1	1977
Turner	1	1984
Beloit Catholic	0	
Columbus	0	
Delavan-Darien	0	
Lake Mills	0	
Monroe	0	
Oregon	0	
Champions from 1978-1981, 1985 unknown

=== Football ===
School	Quantity	Years
Evansville	16	1975, 1978, 1981, 1996, 2002, 2003, 2004, 2005, 2006, 2012, 2014, 2015, 2016, 2019, 2025, 2026
Edgerton	12	1979, 1980, 1981, 1982, 1983, 1984, 1989, 1990, 1994, 1995, 2013, 2019
Brodhead/ Juda	10	1991, 1992, 1993, 1997, 1998, 1999, 2000, 2003, 2014, 2015
Big Foot	9	2007, 2008, 2009, 2010, 2011, 2012, 2013, 2014, 2015
Oregon	7	1969, 1970, 1972, 1973, 1974, 1975, 1976
Turner	7	1982, 1983, 1985, 1986, 1987, 1988, 2015
Jefferson	5	1981, 2009, 2011, 2012, 2014
Monroe	4	2021, 2022, 2023, 2024
Clinton	3	2015, 2016, 2017
McFarland	3	2008, 2010, 2018
Delavan-Darien	2	2025, 2026
Milton	2	1977, 1981
Columbus	1	1971
East Troy	1	2012
Lake Mills	1	1970
Palmyra-Eagle	1	2001
Beloit Catholic	0	
Edgewood	0	
Parkview	0	
Whitewater	0	
