= Southern Regional Conference =

Wisconsin high school athletic conference (1937-1958)

The Southern Regional Conference is a former high school athletic conference in southeastern Wisconsin and northern Illinois, operational from 1937 to 1958. Member schools were associated with either the Wisconsin Interscholastic Athletic Association or Illinois High School Association.

== History ==
=== 1937–1949 ===
Location of Original Southern Regional Conference Members

The Southern Regional Conference was formed from a split of four member schools from the Southeastern Wisconsin Conference in 1937: Clinton, Darien, Genoa City and Williams Bay. Along with Capron High School in Illinois, they formed the original five members of the conference. Three of the original members (Clinton, Darien and Williams Bay) were also participants in six-man football, which the conference sponsored due to the small size of its member schools. In 1939, Palmyra joined after competing as an independent following their exit from the Southeastern three years prior. Membership increased to seven when Sharon High School joined the conference in 1940 and eight when Walworth High School joined in 1944. College High School (a lab school run by Whitewater Teachers College) joined the Southern Regional Conference from the Rock River Valley League in 1945, and two years later a tenth member was added in the form of Richmond-Burton High School in Illinois. Capron High School was consolidated into the new North Boone High School in Poplar Grove in 1949, taking Capron's place in the conference.

=== 1949–1958 ===
Location of Southern Regional Conference Members (1949-1956)

Membership continued at ten for the next seven years, but the Southern Regional Conference quickly started to shed members in the late 1950s due to both schools leaving the conference and consolidation of rural school districts. The first domino to fall was North Boone High School's exit from the conference in 1956, they joined the SHARK Conference that same year. Richmond-Burton High School took the same path as North Boone a year later, leaving the Southern Regional in 1957 to join them in the SHARK. On the northern side of the state line, Darien High School merged with nearby Delavan High School to form the new Delavan-Darien High School, and the new school took Delavan's place in the Southern Lakes Conference. Additionally, the Southern Regional Conference made the transition to eight-man football to take effect in the 1957 season. Two more consolidations occurred in 1958: Sharon and Walworth High Schools merged to form the new Big Foot High School, and Genoa City merged with Lake Geneva to form Badger High School. Big Foot was to set to remain in the Southern Regional Conference due to their predecessors both being member schools, but Badger took Lake Geneva's place in the Southern Lakes Conference. College High in Whitewater was also set for closing by Whitewater State College in 1959, so they left the conference to compete as an independent for their last season.

=== Epilogue ===
Location of Final Southern Regional Conference Members

With all of the changes to membership in the Southern Regional Conference, only four schools (Big Foot, Clinton, Palmyra and Williams Bay) were set to compete in the conference for the 1958–59 school year. The conference decided to disband that year, and its last season was in eight-man football with a membership roster bolstered by three football-only additions from the shuttered Suburban Six-Man Football League (Deerfield, Marshall and Norris Foundation). After completion of the football season, three schools (Big Foot, Clinton and Palmyra) joined the Southeastern Wisconsin Conference and Williams Bay entered the Southern Wisconsin Private Schools (SWAPS) Conference, which they played in for one season before joining the Southeastern in 1959.

== Conference membership history ==
=== Final members ===
| School | Location | Affiliation | Mascot | Colors | Joined | Left | Conference Joined | Current Conference |
|---|---|---|---|---|---|---|---|---|
| Clinton | Clinton, WI | Public | Cougars | | 1937 | 1958 | Southeastern Wisconsin | Rock Valley |
| Genoa City | Genoa City, WI | Public | Orioles | | 1937 | 1958 | Closed (consolidated into Badger) | |
| Palmyra | Palmyra, WI | Public | Panthers | | 1939 | 1958 | Southeastern Wisconsin | Trailways |
| Sharon | Sharon, WI | Public | Panthers | | 1940 | 1958 | Closed (consolidated into Big Foot) | |
| Walworth | Walworth, WI | Public | Warriors | | 1944 | 1958 | Closed (consolidated into Big Foot) | |
| Whitewater College | Whitewater, WI | Public (Lab school) | Quakers, Preps | | 1945 | 1958 | Independent | Closed in 1959 |
| Williams Bay | Williams Bay, WI | Public | Bulldogs | | 1937 | 1958 | SWAPS | Trailways |

=== Previous members ===
| School | Location | Affiliation | Mascot | Colors | Joined | Left | Conference Joined | Current Conference |
|---|---|---|---|---|---|---|---|---|
| Capron | Capron, IL | Public | Vikings | | 1937 | 1949 | Closed (consolidated into North Boone) | |
| Darien | Darien, WI | Public | Golden Eagles | | 1937 | 1957 | Closed (consolidated into Delavan-Darien) | |
| North Boone | Poplar Grove, IL | Public | Vikings | | 1949 | 1956 | SHARK (IHSA) | Kishwaukee River (IHSA) |
| Richmond-Burton | Richmond, IL | Public | Rockets | | 1947 | 1957 | SHARK (IHSA) | Big Northern (IHSA) |

=== Football-only members ===
| School | Location | Affiliation | Mascot | Colors | Seasons | Primary Conference |
|---|---|---|---|---|---|---|
| Walworth | Walworth, WI | Public | Warriors | | 1941-1943 | Independent |
| Richmond-Burton | Richmond, IL | Public | Rockets | | 1946 | Independent |
| Alden-Hebron | Hebron, IL | Public | Little Giants | | 1948-1958 | Independent |
| Deerfield | Deerfield, WI | Public | Demons | | 1958 | Madison Suburban |
| Marshall | Marshall, WI | Public | Cardinals | | 1958 | Madison Suburban |
| Norris Foundation | Mukwonago, WI | Public (Alternative) | Nor'smen | | 1958 | Southeastern Wisconsin |
| Palmyra | Palmyra, WI | Public | Panthers | | 1958 | Southeastern Wisconsin |
| Whitewater College | Whitewater, WI | Public (Lab school) | Quakers, Prep | | 1958 | Independent |
| Williams Bay | Williams Bay, WI | Public | Bulldogs | | 1958 | SWAPS |

== List of conference champions ==
=== Boys Basketball ===
| School | Quantity | Years |
|---|---|---|
| Walworth | 6 | 1946, 1947, 1950, 1951, 1953, 1957 |
| Williams Bay | 5 | 1940, 1941, 1945, 1948, 1958 |
| Richmond-Burton | 4 | 1952, 1954, 1955, 1956 |
| Genoa City | 2 | 1941, 1942 |
| Clinton | 1 | 1939 |
| Sharon | 1 | 1949 |
| Capron | 0 | |
| Darien | 0 | |
| North Boone | 0 | |
| Palmyra | 0 | |
| Whitewater College | 0 | |
Champions from 1938, 1943-1944 unknown

=== Football ===
| School | Quantity | Years |
|---|---|---|
| Clinton | 5 | 1942, 1947, 1948, 1949, 1951 |
| Richmond-Burton | 5 | 1946, 1947, 1954, 1955, 1956 |
| Williams Bay | 5 | 1937, 1938, 1940, 1943, 1953 |
| Alden-Hebron | 2 | 1956, 1957 |
| Darien | 2 | 1939, 1941 |
| North Boone | 2 | 1950, 1952 |
| Deerfield | 1 | 1958 |
| Sharon | 1 | 1956 |
| Whitewater College | 1 | 1945 |
| Capron | 0 | |
| Genoa City | 0 | |
| Palmyra | 0 | |
| Walworth | 0 | |
| Marshall | 0 | |
| Norris Foundation | 0 | |
Champions from 1944 unknown
