= Southeastern Badger Conference =

Wisconsin high school athletic conference (1963-1970)

The Southeastern Badger Conference is a former high school athletic conference in Wisconsin. Founded in 1963 and dissolved in 1970, its membership was located in southeastern Wisconsin and most schools belonged to the Wisconsin Interscholastic Athletic Association.

== History ==
Location of Southeastern Badger Conference Members (1965–1969)

The Southeastern Badger Conference was formed in 1963 in the aftermath of a split between conference members that created two new conferences from the former Southeastern Wisconsin Conference. Clinton, Norris Foundation, Palmyra, Williams Bay joined with Northwestern Military & Naval Academy and Wisconsin School for the Deaf to form the Indian Trails Conference, and the remaining four schools (Salem Central, St. Mary's in Burlington, Union Grove and Waterford) formed the Southeastern Badger Conference after unsuccessfully trying to join the Southern Lakes Conference. Membership increased to six in 1965 when Arrowhead (formerly of the Little Ten Conference) and the newly opened Kettle Moraine High School in Wales joined the conference. Two schools left the Southeastern Badger Conference in 1969: Arrowhead joined the Scenic Moraine Conference and Salem Central joined the Southern Lakes Conference four years after their previous attempt was unsuccessful. The four remaining schools competed for one more season before disbanding in 1970. Union Grove and Waterford finally were able to join the Southern Lakes after two failed attempts, Kettle Moraine joined Arrowhead in the Scenic Moraine Conference and St. Mary's competed for one season as an independent before joining the Midwest Prep Conference in 1971.

== Conference membership history ==
=== Final members ===
School	Location	Affiliation	Mascot	Colors	Joined	Left	Conference Joined	Current Conference
Kettle Moraine	Wales, WI	Public	Lasers		1965	1970	Scenic Moraine	Classic 8
St. Mary's	Burlington, WI	Private (Catholic)	Hilltoppers		1963	1970	Independent	Midwest Classic
Union Grove	Union Grove, WI	Public	Broncos		1963	1970	Southern Lakes	
Waterford	Waterford, WI	Public	Wolverines		1963	1970	Southern Lakes	

=== Previous members ===
School	Location	Affiliation	Mascot	Colors	Joined	Left	Conference Joined	Current Conference
Arrowhead	Hartland, WI	Public	Warhawks		1965	1969	Scenic Moraine	Classic 8
Salem Central	Paddock Lake, WI	Public	Falcons		1963	1969	Southern Lakes	

== List of conference champions ==
=== Boys Basketball ===
School	Quantity	Years
Waterford	3	1965, 1967, 1970
Salem Central	2	1964, 1968
Arrowhead	1	1966
Union Grove	1	1969
Kettle Moraine	0	
St. Mary’s	0	

=== Football ===
School	Quantity	Years
Waterford	5	1963, 1964, 1965, 1968, 1969
Arrowhead	3	1965, 1966, 1967
Salem Central	1	1966
Union Grove	1	1969
Kettle Moraine	0	
St. Mary’s	0	
