= Beloit Memorial High School =

Public secondary school in Beloit, Wisconsin, United States

- BMHS
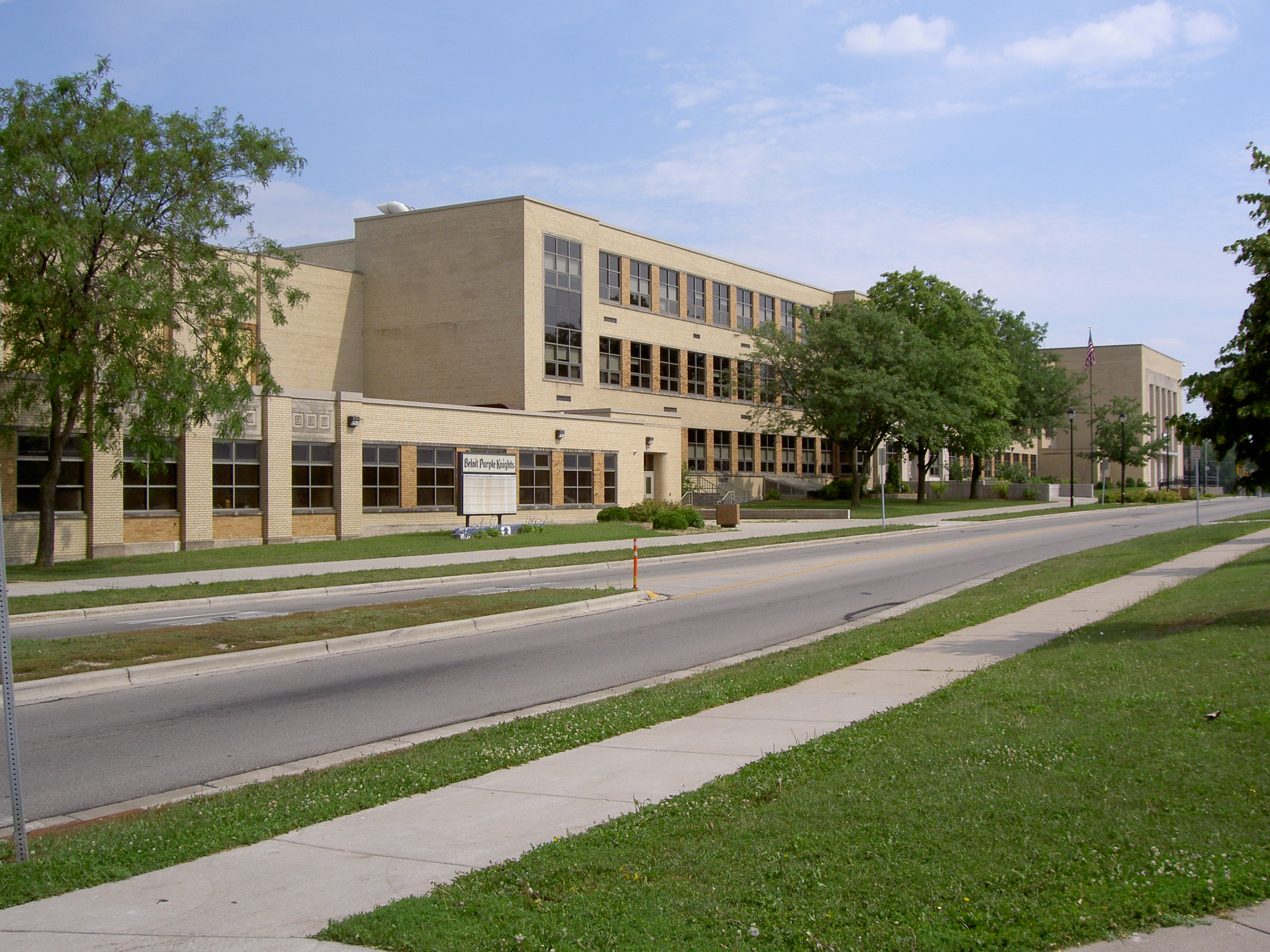
- Front of Beloit Memorial High School

Location
- 1225 Fourth Street; Beloit, Wisconsin; United States
- 42°30′52.39″N 89°2′15.7″W

Information
- Type: Public secondary
- Oversight: School District of Beloit
- Principal: Emily Pelz
- Faculty: 120
- Freshman, sophomore, junior, senior: 9–12
- Enrollment: 1,378 (2023–2024)
- Color
- Athletics: Southern Lakes Conference
- Mascot: Purple Knight
- Rival: Waterford Union High School, Westosha Central High School, Janesville Craig High School
- Yearbook: The Beloiter
- Website: Official website

Beloit Memorial High School is a public, four-year comprehensive high school in Beloit, Wisconsin.

== Academics ==
Beloit Memorial has an enrollment of approximately 1,700 students, with 120 full-time certified staff and an average class size of 28 students.

The school has a charter school complex, The Hendricks Education Center, which is located across the Rock River from Beloit Memorial. Hendricks enrolls over 200 students and has an online learning facility, an auto body shop, and a cafeteria.

== Extracurricular activities ==
=== Newspaper ===
Beloit Memorial supports the state's oldest high school newspaper, the monthly Increscent, founded in 1894. It won first place in General Excellence by the Wisconsin Newspaper Association in 2010 and second place in 2009 and 2011. The Increscent publishes an annual humor issue, called the Uncrescent.

=== Theatre ===
BMHS Theatre performs a fall play and a spring musical and supplements those works with other student-driven projects, including improvisation and student-directed one-act plays. The theater group performed as the showcase production at the Wisconsin CESA conference in 2008 and at the Wisconsin High School Theatre Festival in 2009. They performed at the 2010, 2013, and 2024 Festival Fringe in Edinburgh, Scotland, the world's largest performing arts festival, as part of the American High School Theatre Festival. BMHS Theatre is a student-led program, with student officers and a student stage manager.

Each year, the theatre group competes in a statewide competition for the Tommy Awards with its spring musical. In 2011, it received Tommy Awards for its musical production of Hairspray: Outstanding Lead, Outstanding Supporting, Outstanding Ensemble, Community Engagement Award, and Outstanding Stage Manager. In 2012, the theatre group received Tommy Awards for its musical production of Urinetown: Outstanding Musical, Outstanding Lead, and two Outstanding Supporting Roles.

=== Music ===
The BMHS Jazz 1 Band or the Jazz Orchestra has competed in several Midwestern jazz festivals, such as "Music in the Parks" and "Music in the Meadows". It has competed in Wisconsin, Iowa, Illinois, Missouri, Indiana, Ohio, Florida, Louisiana, and New York. In 2009, 2012, 2013, 2014, 2015, 2016, and 2018, 2019, 2020, 2022, 2023, and 2024 it was chosen from among 15 other bands in the United States to compete in Essentially Ellington in New York.

=== Athletics ===
Memorial offers 23 varsity sports: basketball, football, boys' and girls' swimming, boys' and girls' soccer, boys' and girls' volleyball, wrestling, boys' and girls' hockey, boys' and girls' track, boys' and girls' cross country, baseball, softball, boys' and girls' tennis, spirit squad, and boys' and girls' golf. The school competes in the WIAA Southern Lakes Conference in athletics. The teams' nickname is the Purple Knights. The boys' swim team is known as the "Purple Tide", the girls' swim team the "Lady Tide", the girls' soccer team a joint team between Beloit Memorial and Beloit Turner) "Team Knitro," and the girls' hockey team ( a co-op team composed of Beloit Memorial, Beloit Turner, Clinton, Janesville Craig, and Janesville Parker) "Rock County Fury". BMHS is the main school for the boys' co-op hockey team consisting of Beloit Memorial, Beloit Turner, Hononegah, Clinton, The Lincoln Academy, Brodhead, and Parkview.

The boys' basketball team has the second most appearances at the state tournament, with 26. Beloit has also won the second most boys' basketball championships, with seven championships, and is one of four high schools to win three championships in a row.

=== Homecoming ===
Beloit Memorial's homecoming usually takes place the last week of September. The week includes a class competitions, a parade, an all school pep-rally, a football game and a traditional homecoming dance.

== Building projects ==
Beloit Memorial's "First Impression" project has put two large flower pots in front of the school, remade the front entrance, and repainted the gym.

With the April 3, 2012 passage of the $70 million referendum in Beloit, a new aquatics facility is being built at the high school. The eight-lane pool will have seating for more than 800, diving boards, a ramp for wheelchair access, and community and student locker rooms. The old pool will be converted into a fitness center, and the cardio and weight rooms will become classrooms. A new tennis court will also be built near the school.

Between 2005 and 2011, PAPAS, Inc. (Parents Advocating for the Performing Arts in our Schools) raised over $500,000 for the performing arts program. This was used primarily for advancements in technology in the auditorium, including the sound, lighting, fly systems, and other backstage technologies.

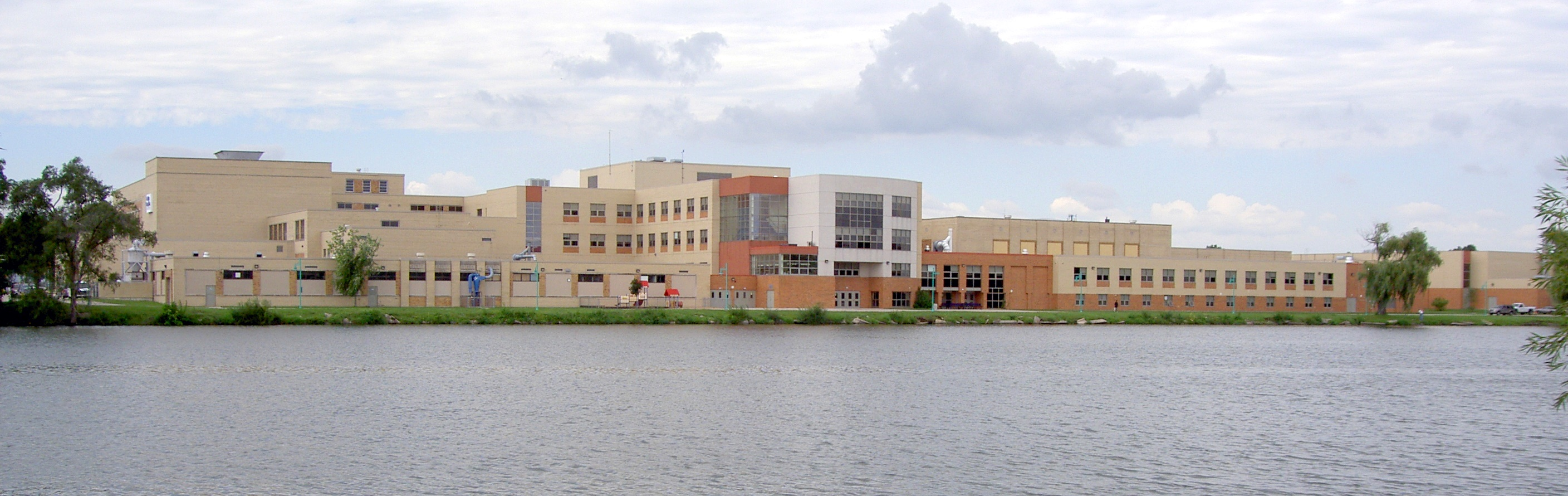
Rear of school

== Notable alumni ==
- Clinton Anderson, Wisconsin State Representative
- Tony Brizzolara - former MLB Baseball player with the Atlanta Braves
- Jimmy Caldwell - former head coach of the Detroit Lions and Indianapolis Colts
- Franklin Clarke - former NFL football player with the Dallas Cowboys and the Cleveland Browns
- Bill Flannigan - former NFL player
- Bill Hanzlik - former NBA basketball player
- Gary Johnson - Wisconsin State Assembly
- Jerry Kenney - former MLB baseball player with the New York Yankees and the Cleveland Indians
- Stephanie Klett - Wisconsin Secretary of Tourism; former Miss Wisconsin
- Gene Knutson - former NFL player with the Green Bay Packers
- Eugene Lee - Tony Award-winning stage designer for Saturday Night Live and Wicked
- Terell Parks (born 1991), professional basketball player in the Israeli Basketball Premier League
- Tom Pratt - American football coach
- Alan S. Robertson - Wisconsin State Assembly
- Tracy Silverman - violinist
- Shelia Stubbs - Wisconsin State Assembly member from the 77th District
- Rusty Tillman - former NFL player and assistant coach
- ”Crocodile” Kyle Weaver - basketball player for Alba Berlin, a German League team
- Timothy Weeden - Wisconsin State Legislature
- Michael White - five-star chef
