= SWAPS Conference =

Wisconsin high school athletic conference (1957-1961)

The Southern Wisconsin Association of Private Schools Conference, more commonly known by its abbreviated form (SWAPS Conference), is a former high school athletic conference consisting mostly of private high schools in southern Wisconsin. It was formed in 1957 and disbanded in 1961.

== History ==
Location of Original SWAPS Conference Members

The SWAPS Conference was founded in 1957 by five small high schools in southern Wisconsin. Despite the name of the conference, only four of the five original members were private schools. Beloit Catholic and St. Mary's both belonged to the newly created Wisconsin Catholic Interscholastic Athletic Association, and the two military academies (Northwestern Military & Naval Academy and St. John's Military Academy) did not belong to any sort of larger organization at that time. The fifth member, Wisconsin School for the Deaf, was funded by the state of Wisconsin, and was therefore the only school in the conference's original roster to be eligible for membership in the Wisconsin Interscholastic Athletic Association. A second public high school (Williams Bay) was added in 1958 after the dissolution of the Southern Regional Conference. They were members of the conference for one school year before joining the Southeastern Wisconsin Conference in 1959. The SWAPS Conference was disbanded after the 1960–1961 school year. Only one former member joined another conference for 1961 (St. Mary's to the Southeastern Wisconsin Conference), and the rest became independents before eventually joining other conferences.

== Conference membership history ==
=== Final members ===
School	Location	Affiliation	Mascot	Colors	Joined	Left	Conference Joined	Current Conference
Beloit Catholic	Beloit, WI	Private (Catholic)	Crusaders		1957	1961	Independent	Closed in 2000
Northwestern Military & Naval Academy	Lake Geneva, WI	Private (Nonsectarian, Military)	Falcons		1957	1961	Independent	Closed in 1995 (merged with St. John's Military Academy)
St. John's Military Academy	Delafield, WI	Private (Nonsectarian, Military)	Lancers		1957	1961	Independent	Midwest Classic
St. Mary's	Burlington, WI	Private (Catholic)	Hilltoppers		1957	1961	Southeastern Wisconsin	Midwest Classic
Wisconsin School for the Deaf	Delavan, WI	Public (Special Needs)	Firebirds		1957	1961	Independent	Indian Trails

=== Previous members ===
School	Location	Affiliation	Mascot	Colors	Joined	Left	Conference Joined	Current Conference
Williams Bay	Williams Bay, WI	Public	Bulldogs		1958	1959	Southeastern Wisconsin	Trailways

== Membership timeline ==
Non-football member

== List of conference champions ==
=== Boys Basketball ===
School	Quantity	Years
Beloit Catholic	2	1958, 1960
Williams Bay	1	1959
Northwestern Military & Naval Academy	0	
St. John's Military Academy	0	
St. Mary's	0	
Wisconsin School for the Deaf	0	
Champions from 1961 unknown

=== Football ===
School	Quantity	Years
Beloit Catholic	1	1958
St. John's Military Academy	1	1960
St. Mary's	1	1959
Northwestern Military & Naval Academy	0	
Wisconsin School for the Deaf	0	
