= Peter Shorts =

American football player (born 1966)

No. 90, 64, 65, 78
- Positions: Defensive tackle, offensive tackle

Personal information
- Born: July 12, 1966 (age 60); Janesville, Wisconsin, U.S.
- Listed height: 6 ft 8 in (2.03 m)
- Listed weight: 278 lb (126 kg)

Career information
- High school: Clinton
- College: Illinois State
- NFL draft: 1989: undrafted

Career history
- New England Patriots (1989); Kansas City Chiefs (1990)*; Green Bay Packers (1990–1991)*; San Antonio Riders (1992); Sacramento Gold Miners (1994); San Antonio Texans (1995); Saskatchewan Roughriders (1995–1996); Hamilton Tiger-Cats (1997)
- * Offseason or practice squad member only
- Stats at Pro Football Reference

John Peter Shorts (born July 12, 1966) is an American former professional football defensive tackle in the National Football League (NFL). He was a member of the New England Patriots during the 1989 NFL season. Shorts grew up in the small town of Clinton, Wisconsin and went to Clinton High School (Clinton, Wisconsin)
