= William Hurlbut =

William Hurlbut may refer to:

- William H. Hurlbut (1837–after 1900), American State Assemblyman in Wisconsin
- William J. Hurlbut (1878 or 1883–1957), American artist, playwright and screenwriter including for Bride of Frankenstein
- William B. Hurlbut (born 1945), American professor at Stanford's Neuroscience Institute
