= Paul Stender =

American racer

Paul Stender, AKA "Jet Car Paul," is best known for designing, building, and driving some of the most extreme and fastest Jet/turbine-engine-powered land vehicles in the world.

== Early life and education ==
Stender was born in Big Bend, Wisconsin, and attended Mukwonago High School. His parents were John and Patrica. His father served in the US Navy, ran a large dairy farm in Big Bend, and later became a realtor. Stender's mother raised him on the farm.

== Racing career ==
=== Beginnings ===
Stender grew up racing ATVs, motorcycles, and snowmobiles in his teens and early twenties. He then began racing Badger and USAC midgets. He continued his racing career as a sprint car driver at racetracks across the country. After a series of crashes that resulted in broken bones and concussions, he retired from oval racing in the early 1990s.

He built his Polaris Powersports Dealership into one of the top 10 volume dealers in the world, gaining him the nickname "Polaris Paul".

In 1994, with help from his dealership's staff and the Muskego Icetronauts Snowmobile Club, Stender broke the endurance record for snowmobiles by completing 1740 miles on a Ski-Doo MX-Z 440 snowmobile in 24 hours on Big Muskego Lake, Muskego, Wisconsin, enduring wind chill temperatures in excess of -80 degrees F at 100 MPH.

=== Jet motorsports exhibition ===
A year later, Stender was drag racing a snowmobile on asphalt at Great Lakes Dragaway in Union Grove, Wisconsin when he watched a jet funny car and a dragster race. He decided that jet car exhibition was going to be the next step in his Motorsports career. He purchased the Jazz Jet Funny Car, which he renamed "Runnin' with the Devil". It was capable of speeds in excess of 300 mph. In his first full year of racing, he was awarded the Pro-Jet Rookie of the Year Award.

The newly built Dodge Ramjet was the next jet vehicle in the now-named "Speed For Hire" stable of jets. Stender ran a 397 MPH pass at an airshow in Texas on a three-mile-long runway, setting the record for the world's fastest jet pickup.

=== Monsters ===
In the late 1990s, Stender decided to dedicate all his time and effort to his motorsports business. He acquired the car-crushing Monster Harley-Davidson motorcycle to perform at events nationwide. It was also put on display during Harley-Davidson's 100-year anniversary.

Stender went to a Monster Truck show in Michigan to watch his new jet ATV perform. He met Kirk Dabney of Xtreme Overkill Monster Truck fame. Dabney sold a truck to Stender. Clear Channel Motorsports, now named Feld Motorsports, asked Stender to run the "Bulldozer" body on his truck. The Bulldozer Monster Truck was one of the premier Monster Trucks in the Monster Jam and Thunder Nationals series. Stender ran the entire series until a late-season crash shattered his L-1 vertebra. The Bulldozer contract was completed, and he decided to mount a new Dodge body on the truck and name it "American Cowboy" with its American theme and two American flags on the rear.

=== More jets ===
After a few years with the monsters, Stender decided to sell them and concentrate on the jet/turbine end of the business. He was campaigning the Ramjet and Runnin' with the Devil for a few years along with the newest members to the family of jets, the Kamikaze and Green Monster Jet ATVs.

At an airshow, he saw the wind blow a portable outhouse across the tarmac at high speed. This gave him the idea for a jet-powered outhouse. One week later, a jet outhouse was racing around Big Bend, Wisconsin.

Stender moved his motorsports operation to Indianapolis, Indiana, the racing capital of the world. There he was surrounded by race teams and racing businesses.

At this time, he gained the nickname "Jet Car Paul".

Discovery Channel's hit show Monster Garage was looking for something new. Stender had always wanted to build a jet beer truck, as he was from Milwaukee, Wisconsin. He found the largest allowed jet engine in the NHRA rulebook, a General Electric J-79 out of an F-4 fighter jet. It was 20 feet long and had 21,000 pounds of thrust and 42,000 horsepower. The Monster Garage crew flew to Stender's shop in Indianapolis, and, after a week of filming, they completed the J-79-powered jet beer truck.

Stender next built a jet school bus. It was 30 feet long and had the same GE J-79 jet engine. It had three passenger seats in it, to give rides to media members and others. The jet bus was timed at an event in Texas, where it ran 367 mph, a world record for a school bus. It has since been featured on numerous television shows and websites.

After giving a speech at a school, he asked what the kids would like to see him build next. Someone said, "jet doghouse". He built a jet-powered doghouse a week later.

Stender has performed at air shows and motorsport events around the world, including in Trinidad, Puerto Rico, and Abu Dhabi.

Vehicles Stender has owned include the Dodge RamJet that reaches speeds near 400 mph, the Port-o-Jet jet-powered outhouse that reached 70 miles (110 km) per hour, the School Time Jet School Bus, the Polaris RZR-JET, the American Thunder Jet Jeep, the Armageddon Jet Funny Car, and the 267 MPH Green Monster Jet Motorcycle. There are even some street-legal turbine-powered vehicles, including a 928 Porsche, a Chevrolet pickup truck, and a 23' Ford T-Bucket.

=== Media ===
Stender and his vehicles have been featured in various media including FHM, Popular Science, ESPN the Magazine, Ripley's Believe It or Not!, and the National Enquirer. He has been featured by many American and international television outlets such as Fox News, The Discovery Channel, TLC, CMT, NBC, CBS & ABC News along with others..

Currently Paul is writing an autobiography titled Jet Car Paul: Life at 300 MPH. He hopes to have it on bookshelves in 2026. He also has a few more jet vehicles on the drawing board that he plans to build in the future.
