= Greg Kent =

American football player (born 1943)

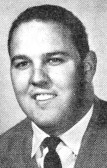
- Kent, circa 1965

No. 73, 74, 83
- Positions: Offensive tackle, Defensive end

Personal information
- Born: July 18, 1943 (age 83); Elkhorn, Wisconsin, U.S.
- Listed height: 6 ft 6 in (1.98 m)
- Listed weight: 275 lb (125 kg)

Career information
- High school: Whitewater (Whitewater, Wisconsin)
- College: Wisconsin (1962); Utah (1963–1965)
- NFL draft: 1965: 7th round, 92nd overall pick
- AFL draft: 1965: Red shirt 6th round, 43rd overall pick

Career history
- Detroit Lions (1965)*; Oakland Raiders (1966); Montreal Beavers (1967); San Jose Apaches (1967); Detroit Lions (1968)
- * Offseason or practice squad member only

Career NFL/AFL statistics
- Sacks: 1
- Stats at Pro Football Reference

Greg Kent (born July 18, 1943) is an American former professional player in the American Football League (AFL) and National Football League (NFL) for the Oakland Raiders and Detroit Lions in 1966 and 1968 as a tackle. He played at the collegiate level at the University of Utah and the University of Wisconsin–Madison.

== Biography ==
Kent was born Edward Greg Kent on July 18, 1943, in Elkhorn, Wisconsin. He attended Whitewater High School.

Kent lives in Alamo, California and is the co-owner of California Custom Carpets in Dublin, California.

== See also ==
- List of Detroit Lions players
