= Bill Flanagan (American football) =

American football player (1901–1935)

William Sylvester Flanagan (Note: His surname is also spelled Flannigan and Flanigan in various vital records, but the spelling Flanagan is found in his obituary in the Wisconsin State Journal and on his gravestone (Sylvester W. Flanagan) at Calvary Cemetery in Monroe, Wisconsin.) (April 9, 1901 – February 19, 1935) played for the Louisville Colonels of the National Football League during the 1926 NFL season.

Flanagan was born on April 9, 1901, in Green County, Wisconsin, the son of William H. Flanagan (1865–1939) and Marie Keegan Flanagan (1882–1972). He attended Beloit Memorial High School in Beloit, Wisconsin. He died in 1935.
