= Clinton Community School District (Wisconsin) =

School district in Wisconsin, United States

Address
- 112 Milwaukee Road Clinton, Wisconsin, 53525; United States

District information
- Type: Public
- Grades: PreK–12
- NCES District ID: 5502640

Students and staff
- Students: 1,094
- Teachers: 75.2
- Staff: 65.47
- Student–teacher ratio: 14.55

Other information
- Website: www.clinton.k12.wi.us

The Clinton Community School District is a school district in Clinton, Wisconsin, Rock County, Wisconsin, United States. The district has an elementary (4K-4th grade), middle (5th-8th grade), and Clinton High School (9th-12th grade). The school district is governed by an elected school board with seven members, each elected by the electors of the school district as a whole.

== Demographics ==
11% of students are students with disabilities, 6% are students with English language needs, and 37% are economically disadvantaged. 13.7% of students identify as Hispanic, 2.5% as Black, 2.5% as other, and 81% as Caucasian.

== Athletics ==
=== High school ===
==== Boys ====
- Cross country running
- Football
- Basketball
- Track and field
- Golf
- Baseball
- Wrestling, which is coed.

==== Girls ====
- Cross country running
- Basketball
- Track and field
- Golf
- Cheerleading
- Volleyball
- Soccer

=== Middle school ===
- Boys Football
- Girls Volleyball
- Boys and Girls Cross Country
- Coed Wrestling
- Boys and Girls Track and field

== Clubs and Organizations ==
- Art Club
- Band
- DECA
- Drama Club
- FFA
- Forensics
- German Club
- Key Club
- Honor Society
- SkillsUSA
- Spanish Club
- Student Council
- Yearbook
