= School District of Beloit =

School district in Beloit, Wisconsin

The School District of Beloit

Location
- Beloit, Wisconsin United States

District information
- Type: Public
- Motto: Thinking Beyond Now
- Grades: Pre-K-12

Students and staff
- Students: 4,954

Other information
- Website: www.sdb.k12.wi.us

The School District of Beloit is a school district in the county of Rock County, Wisconsin serving the City of Beloit. The School District of Beloit educates approximately 4,954 students in 6 elementary schools, 2 intermediate schools and 1 high school. The school district offers four-year-old kindergarten, alternative programming, and charter schools.

The district includes almost all of Beloit.

== Schools ==
=== High schools ===
- Beloit Memorial High School

=== 6-12 Schools ===
- Beloit Learning Academy

=== Intermediate schools ===
- Aldrich Intermediate School
- Fran Fruzen Intermediate School

=== Elementary schools ===
- Beloit Early Learning
- Gaston
- Hackett
- Robinson
- Todd
- Merrill
- Converse
