= William H. Hurlbut =

American politician

William H. Hurlbut (January 8, 1837 – after 1900) was an American politician who served as a member of the Wisconsin State Assembly.

== Biography ==
Born in Venice, New York, Hurlbut attended Cortland Academy in nearby Homer and became a physician. After moving to Wisconsin and residing in Clinton and then Beloit, he settled in Elkhorn in 1870.

== Assembly career ==
Hurlbut was elected to the Assembly in 1896 and 1898. He was a Republican.
