= Burlington Catholic Central High School =

Catholic Central High School

Location
- 148 McHenry Street; Burlington, (Racine County), Wisconsin 53105-1826; United States; 42°40′29″N 88°16′53″W

Information
- School type: Private, coeducational Christian
- Motto: Opportunity Awaits
- Religious affiliation: Roman Catholic
- Established: 1920
- Principal: Nic Kelly
- Grades: 9–12
- Colors: Royal blue and white
- Slogan: Topper Pride
- Sports: Football, Greco Roman Wrestling (Boys), Freestyle Wrestling (Girls), Boys & Girls Basketball, Boys & Girls Volleyball, Tennis, Baseball, Softball, Track, Cross Country & Girls Soccer, Boys & Girls Swimming, Trap Shooting
- Mascot: Harvey the Hilltopper
- Nickname: Toppers
- Team name: Hilltoppers
- Accreditation: AdvancED
- Tuition: $10,500
- Feeder schools: Burlington Catholic School, St. Francis de Sales Parish School, St. Andrews School
- Academic Dean: Michael Metoff
- Admissions Director: Deanna Koch
- Athletic Director: Joe Schiessl
- Communications Director: Jessica Anderson & Megan Swederski
- Development Director: Georgean Selburg
- Website: http://www.catholiccentralhs.org

Catholic Central High School in Burlington, Wisconsin, United States, is a private, Catholic, co-educational high school in the Archdiocese of Milwaukee. Founded in 1920, it offers both college-prep and general studies for grades 9 through 12.

== Accreditation ==
CCHS is a member of the National Catholic Educational Association and is accredited by AdvancED. One notable alumnus of the school is Gonzalo Perez, Jr.

== Athletics ==
Catholic Central's athletic teams are nicknamed the Hilltoppers, and they have been members of the Midwest Classic Conference since 2023.

=== Athletic conference affiliation history ===
- Milwaukee Catholic Conference (1932–1934)
- SWAPS Conference (1957–1961)
- Southeastern Wisconsin Conference (1961–1963)
- Southeastern Badger Conference (1963–1970)
- Midwest Prep Conference (1971–1983)
- Midwest Classic Conference (1983–2012)
- Metro Classic Conference (2012–2023)
- Midwest Classic Conference (2023–present)
