= Beloit (town), Wisconsin =

Town of Beloit, Wisconsin
- Town
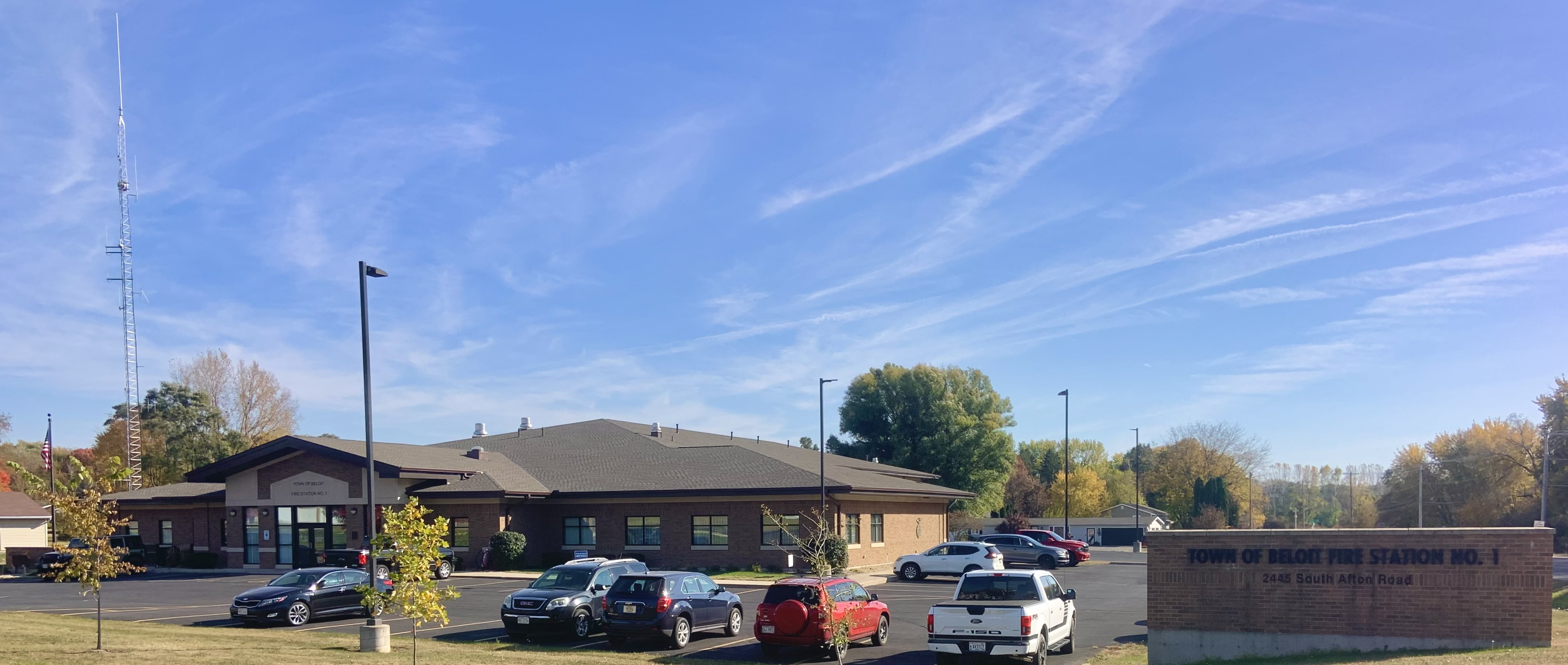
- Beloit Town Hall and fire station

- Location of the Town of Beloit in Rock County and the state of Wisconsin.
- Coordinates: 42°32′23″N 89°3′4″W
- Country: United States
- State: Wisconsin
- County: Rock

Area
  - Total: 27.0 sq mi (70.0 km^{2})
  - Land: 26.3 sq mi (68.2 km^{2})
  - Water: 0.69 sq mi (1.8 km^{2})
- Elevation: 846 ft (258 m)

Population (2020)
  - Total: 7,721
  - Density: 267/sq mi (103.2/km^{2})
- Time zone: UTC-6 (Central (CST))
  - Summer (DST): UTC-5 (CDT)
- Area code: 608
- FIPS code: 55-06525
- GNIS feature ID: 1582792
- Website: https://www.townofbeloitwi.gov/

The Town of Beloit is a town in Rock County, Wisconsin, United States. The population was 7,721 at the 2020 census. The city of Beloit is adjacent to the Town of Beloit. The unincorporated communities of Belcrest, Crestview, and Victory Heights are in the town. The town hosts Festival on the Rock, an annual celebration held in September at Preservation Park.

== Geography ==
According to the United States Census Bureau, the town has a total area of 27 mi^{2} (70 km^{2}), of which 26.3 mi^{2} (68 km^{2}) is land and 0.7 mi^{2} (1.8 km^{2}) (2.55%) is water.

== Demographics ==
As of the census of 2000, there were 7,038 people, 2,814 households, and 2,042 families residing in the town. The population density was 267.4 people per square mile (103.2/km^{2}). There were 2,949 housing units at an average density of 112.0 per square mile (43.3/km^{2}). The racial makeup of the town was 90.00% White, 6.68% Black or African American, 0.28% Native American, 0.55% Asian, 0.97% from other races, and 1.52% from two or more races. 2.59% of the population were Hispanic or Latino of any race.

There were 2,814 households, out of which 29.0% had children under the age of 18 living with them, 60.5% were married couples living together, 8.5% had a female householder with no husband present, and 27.4% were non-families. 23.1% of all households were made up of individuals, and 11.1% had someone living alone who was 65 years of age or older. The average household size was 2.50 and the average family size was 2.91.

The population was 23.3% under the age of 18, 6.5% from 18 to 24, 24.9% from 25 to 44, 28.5% from 45 to 64, and 16.8% who were 65 years of age or older. The median age was 42 years. For every 100 females, there were 98 males. For every 100 females age 18 and over, there were 96 males.

The median income for a household in the town was $47,970, and the median income for a family was $54,173. Males had a median income of $39,358 versus $24,766 for females. The per capita income for the town was $21,874. About 6.2% of families and 7.6% of the population were below the poverty line, including 14.2% of those under age 18 and 3.0% of those age 65 or over.

== Education ==
- F. J. Turner High School is located in the town of Beloit.

== Transportation ==
Beloit Transit serves a small portion of the eastern side of the town.
