= SHARK Conference =

Sports association in Illinois/Wisconsin

- Conference: IHSA; WIAA
- Founded: 1946
- Folded: 1982
- No. of teams: 17
- Region: North-central Illinois and South-central Wisconsin (Boone, DeKalb, Lee, McHenry, Stephenson and Winnebago counties in Illinois and Rock in Wisconsin)

Locations
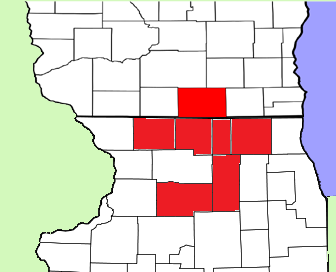
- The SHARK Conference within Illinois and Wisconsin

The SHARK Conference was a high school conference in north central Illinois and south central Wisconsin. The conference participated in athletics and activities in the Illinois High School Association (IHSA) and the Wisconsin Interscholastic Athletic Association (WIAA). The conference included private and public high schools with enrollments between 75 and 2,000 students in Boone, DeKalb, Lee, McHenry, Stephenson and Winnebago counties in Illinois and Rock in Wisconsin.

== History ==
The name SHARK is an acronym representing the first letter of its 5 charter members. (South Beloit, Harlem, Aquin, Rockton Hononegah and Kirkland-Hiawatha) The SHARK originated as a collection of schools in northern Illinois based primarily on proximity and not on enrollment. By 1953, Kirkland-Hiawatha left the conference and was replaced with Harvard and Marengo, taking the total number of teams to six. In 1955 Freeport Aquin left the conference, however Rockford St. Thomas High School took their place. The conference continued to morph as the 1950s came to a close with North Boone High School joining in 1957 and Richmond-Burton in 1958. Also in 1958, based on the completion of Boylan Catholic High School, St. Thomas dropped out of the conference as their students began transitioning toward a new high school, and Harlem left the league in order to join the Big 8 Conference with the intent of playing competition with similar enrollments.

As the 1960s began, Alden-Hebron High School joined, however, it quickly left in 1964 along with Richmond-Burton. The following season, Winnebago High School and two Beloit, Wisconsin schools joined the conference. The two schools from Wisconsin included; Beloit Catholic High School and Turner High School. Winnebago remained a member of the league until 1972 but left for the Mid Northern Conference. Amboy High School quickly replaced them in 1972, but left after the 1975 season, heading to the newly formed Three Rivers Conference. In 1978, Johnsburg High School joined the league and in 1981, the conference's final season, Woodstock Marian would be added. However, North Boone, Beloit Catholic, and South Beloit all left the conference before the start of the season, leaving the conference with only five teams in its final season.

== All-Time Membership ==
The SHARK Conference had various teams throughout its history, this list of schools encompasses all of the schools which were once a part of the conference.

School	Location	County	Mascot	Colors	Year Joined	Year Left	Total Years	Still open	Current Conference
Alden-Hebron; High School	Hebron, IL	McHenry	Giants	Green, White, Black	1960 (football) 1959 (other sports)	1964	5	Yes	8-Man Football North Division (football) Northeastern Athletic Conference (other sports)
Amboy; High School	Amboy, IL	Lee	Clippers	Red, White, Black	1972	1975	3	Yes	8-Man Football North Division (football) Northwest Upstate Illini Conference (other sports)
Aquin Catholic; High School	Freeport, IL	Stephenson	Bulldogs	Navy Blue, Gold	1946	1955	9	No*	
Beloit Catholic; High School	Beloit, WI	Rock	Crusaders	Green, Gold	1964	1981	17	No**	
Harlem; High School	Machesney Park, IL	Winnebago	Huskies	Black, Orange	1946	1958	12	Yes	Northern Illinois Conference (NIC-10)
Harvard; High School	Harvard, IL	McHenry	Hornets	Black, Gold	1953 (football) 1952 (other sports)	1982	30	Yes	Kishwaukee River Conference
Hononegah; High School	Rockton, IL	Winnebago	Indians	Purple, Gold	1946	1982	36	Yes	Northern Illinois Conference (NIC-10)
Johnsburg; High School	Johnsburg, IL	McHenry	Skyhawks	Blue, Gold	1978	1982	4	Yes	Kishwaukee River Conference
Kirkland-Hiawatha; High School	Kirkland, IL	DeKalb	Hawks	Navy Blue, Gold	1946	1953	7	Yes	8-Man Football North Division (football) Little Ten Conference (other sports)
Marengo; High School	Marengo, IL	McHenry	Indians	Maroon, White	1953 (football) 1952 (other sports)	1982	30	Yes	Kishwaukee River Conference
Marian Central Catholic; High School	Woodstock, IL	McHenry	Hurricanes	Columbia Blue, White, Red	1981	1982	1	Yes	Independent; Joining the upcoming Chicagoland Christian Conference in 2023
North Boone; High School	Poplar Grove, IL	Boone	Vikings	Green, White	1957	1981	24	Yes	Big Northern Conference
Richmond-Burton; High School	Richmond, IL	McHenry	Rockets	Maroon, Gold	1958	1964	6	Yes	Kishwaukee River Conference
St. Thomas Catholic; High School	Rockford, IL	Winnebago	Tommies	Purple, White	1955	1958	3	No***	
South Beloit; High School	South Beloit, IL	Winnebago	Sobos	Scarlet Red, White	1946	1981	35	Yes	8-Man Football North Division (football) Northeastern Athletic Conference (other sports)
Turner; High School	Beloit, WI	Rock	Trojans	Blue, Gold	1965 (football) 1964 (other sports)	1969	5	Yes	Rock Valley Conference
Winnebago; High School	Winnebago, IL	Winnebago	Indians	Orange, Black	1964	1972	8	Yes	Big Northern Conference

*Aquin Catholic High School would close in 2024.
**Beloit Catholic High School would close in 2000.
***St. Thomas Catholic High School would close in 1962.
Sources:IHSA Conferences, IHSA Coop Teams, and IHSA Member Schools Directory

=== Membership timeline ===
Full members Non-football members
