= F. J. Turner High School =

Location
- 1231 Inman Parkway; Beloit, Wisconsin 53511; United States
- Coordinates: 42°33′18″N 89°01′11″W

Information
- School district: Beloit Turner School District
- Principal: Matt Bright
- Teaching staff: 30.45 (on an FTE basis)
- Grades: 9-12
- Enrollment: 455 (2023-2024)
- Student to teacher ratio: 14.94
- Colors: Blue and gold
- Fight song: "Victors"
- Athletics conference: Rock Valley
- Nickname: Trojans
- Website: turnerhigh.turnerschools.org

F. J. Turner High School is a high school located in the Town of Beloit in Rock County, Wisconsin, and is part of the Beloit Turner School District. The school was named after frontiersman Frederick Jackson Turner. It has 470 students in grades 9 through 12. The school's athletic teams compete in the Wisconsin Interscholastic Athletic Association. The mascot is the Turner Trojan. Their rivals include the Clinton Cougars and the Jefferson Eagles.

== Athletics ==
Turner won a state championship in boys cross country in 1976. Turner won a state championship in football in 1988. Turner won a State Championship in Boys Track in 1987. Turner won a State Championship in Baseball in 2001.

=== Athletic conference affiliation history ===
- SHARK Conference (1964-1969)
- Central Suburban Conference (1969-1977)
- Rock Valley Conference (1977–present)
