= Jefferson High School (Jefferson, Wisconsin) =

Public secondary school in Jefferson, Wisconsin

Location
- 700 West Milwaukee Street; Jefferson, Wisconsin 53549; United States; 43.00398°N 88.81993°W

Information
- School type: Public High School
- Motto: Empowering Futures Together
- Established: 1879
- School district: School District of Jefferson
- Principal: Nicholas Skretta
- Faculty: 46.48 (FTE)
- Grades: 9 through 12
- Enrollment: 618 (2019-20)
- Student to teacher ratio: 13.30
- Color
- Athletics conference: Rock Valley Conference
- Mascot: Eagle
- Website: www.sdoj.org/schools/high/

The Jefferson High School in Wisconsin is an American public high school, that serves the city of Jefferson as well as the neighboring towns of Jefferson, Aztalan, Farmington, Hebron, Oakland, Concord and Sullivan, and various villages and unincorporated areas. One of its historic buildings is listed on the U.S. National Register of Historic Places for its architecture.

In 2019–2020, high school enrollment was 618. It is located at 700 West Milwaukee Street. It is the sole high school of the School District of Jefferson, which is headquartered within the same building complex, with address 206 South Taft Ave.

The school district's Jefferson Middle School is located across South Taft Avenue, and has address 501 South Taft Avenue.

== Athletics ==
Jefferson's athletic teams are known as the Eagles, and the school's fight song is set to the tune of On, Wisconsin!.

The school's teams compete in the Rock Valley Conference.

High school sporting events on the football field and in the school's Premier Bank Gymnasium can be viewed live, or on-demand provided through T1 Sports!.

== History ==
The high school originated in 1879 or 1880 as successor to the Jefferson Liberal Institute, which closed in 1876. The Jefferson High School was opened in 1880 in an 1868-built building which served until, when that building was destroyed by fire on March 27, 1924.

- Jefferson High School
- U.S. National Register of Historic Places
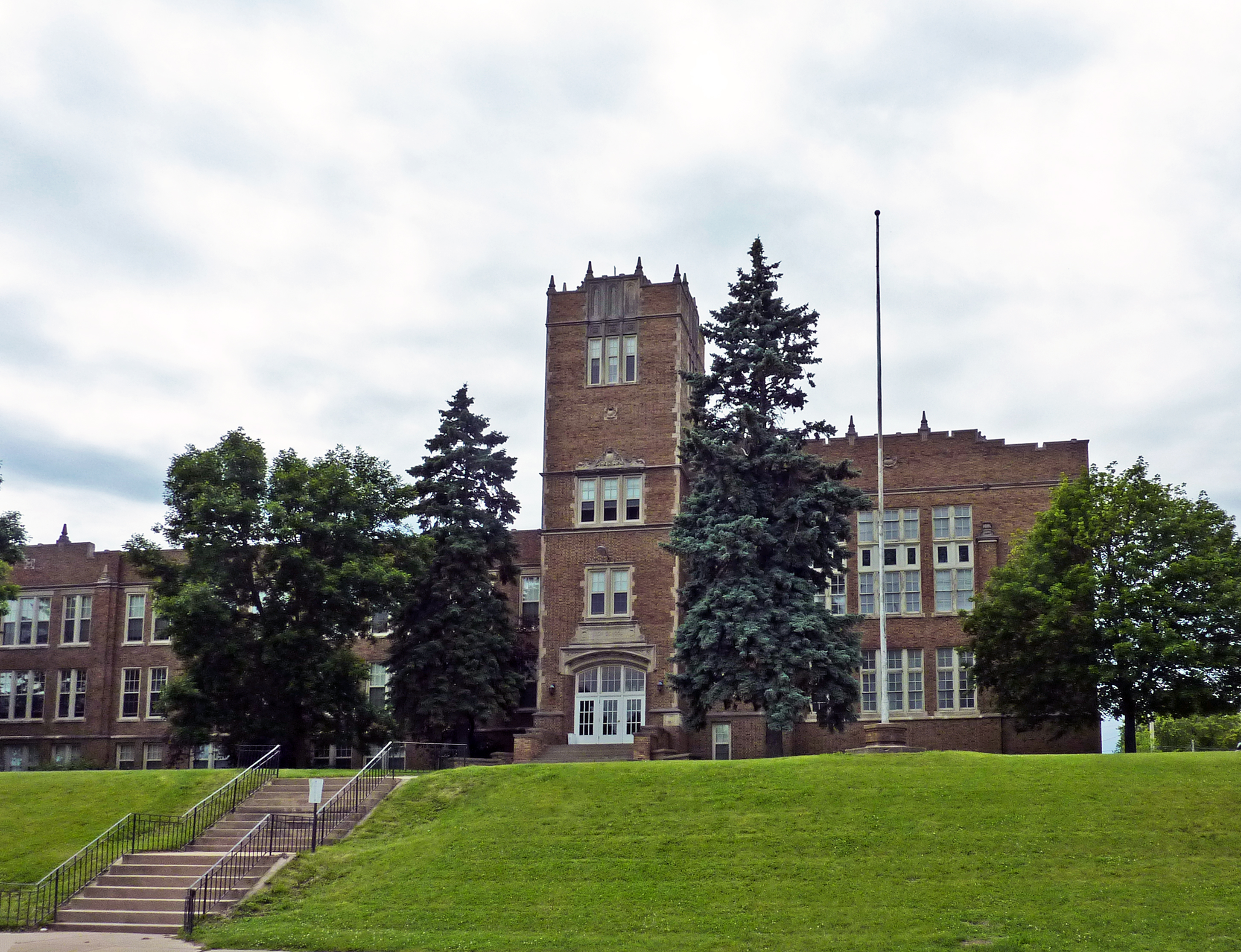
- Former school built 1924-25, now Jefferson Schoolhouse Apartment Homes

- Location within Wisconsin
- Location: 201 S. Copeland Ave., Jefferson, Wisconsin
- Coordinates: 43°00′15″N 88°48′45″W
- Area: 3.5 acres (1.4 ha)
- Built: 1924-25
- Architect: Van Ryn & DeGelleke and Julius Heimerl (1924-25); Foeller, Schober, Berners, Safford and Jahn (1953 addition)
- Architectural style: Collegiate Gothic
- NRHP reference No.: 00001643
- Added to NRHP: January 11, 2001

The replacement high school was built during 1924-25 at 201 S. Copeland Ave. This was a distinguished building in collegiate Gothic style. It was later repurposed as "Jefferson Schoolhouse Apartment Homes".

About the 201 S. Copeland Ave. building, it is described at National Register of Historic Places listings in Jefferson County, Wisconsin as:

Two-story brick school designed in Collegiate Gothic style by Van Ryn & DeGelleke and Jefferson native Julius Heimerl, and built 1924-25. The 1953 addition was designed by Foeller, Schober, Berners, Safford and Jahn of Green Bay.

In 1963, a new Jefferson High School building was constructed which served until 2007. This was designed by architect Lawrence Monberg (1900-1983). This was demolished after 2007 to make way for the present building.

The expansion and addition creating the present building was a $35.19 million project funded by a 2010 school construction bond, and was completed in 2012. It was designed by Plunkett Raysich Architects to utilize natural light to a great extent and includes geothermal heating and cooling. Its 243,110 square feet (22,586 m^{2}) area includes a two-story academic wing, a two-story gym, a new cafeteria and commons, and an eight-lane pool. It was built by Miron Construction of Madison and Milwaukee and by Mass Brothers Construction of Watertown.

== Notable Alumni ==
Lance Leipold - American football coach
