= Waterford Union High School =

Location
- 100 Field Drive; Waterford, Wisconsin 53185; United States
- Coordinates: 42°45′47″N 88°13′6″W

Information
- Type: Public
- Motto: Be prepared. Be responsible. Be respectful.
- Established: 1904
- Superintendent: Luke Francois
- Principal: Daniel Foster
- Staff: 67.63 (FTE)
- Enrollment: 890 (2023–2024)
- Student to teacher ratio: 13.16
- Campus: Rural
- Colors: Green and white
- Song: Washington and Lee Swing
- Athletics conference: Southern Lakes Conference
- Nickname: Wolverines
- Yearbook: Emerald
- Website: www.waterforduhs.k12.wi.us

Waterford Union High School, more commonly known as Waterford High School, is a public high school located in Waterford, Racine County, Wisconsin.

It is a part of the Waterford Union School District. A part of the district extends into Vernon, Waukesha County.

== Athletics ==
Waterford Union High School offers twenty different sports with a total of 48 teams in various sports such as basketball, cross-country, football, gymnastics, soccer and tennis. The school's athletic teams compete in the Southern Lakes Conference.

=== Athletic conference affiliation history ===
- Southeastern Wisconsin Conference (1928–1963)
- Southeastern Badger Conference (1963–1970)
- Southern Lakes Conference (1970–1997)
- Lakeshore Conference (1997–2008)
- Southern Lakes Conference (2008–present)

== Notable alumni ==
- Sam Alvey – MMA fighter
- Scott Gunderson – state politician
