= Whitewater High School (Wisconsin) =

Location
- 534 South Elizabeth Street; Whitewater, Wisconsin 53190; United States
- Coordinates: 42°49′31.9″N 88°45′15.0″W

Information
- Type: High school
- School district: Whitewater Unified School District
- Superintendent: Caroline Pate-Hefty
- Principal: Brett Mansky
- Staff: 46.50 (FTE)
- Student to teacher ratio: 12.80
- Colours: Red and White
- Slogan: "Every Student a Life Long Learner"
- Nickname: Whippets
- Website: https://whs.wwusd.org/

Whitewater High School is a high school located in the city of Whitewater, Wisconsin, United States. It is a part of the Whitewater Unified School District. It serves students from the city and town of Whitewater and portions of the nearby communities of Richmond, La Grange, Cold Spring, Koshkonong, Lima and Johnstown in Walworth, Jefferson and Rock counties.

== Notable alumni ==
- Stephen E. Ambrose; historian, author, and founder of National World War II Museum
- Ben Heller, MLB pitcher for the Chicago Cubs
- Greg Kent; NFL player
- Dale Markham; NFL player
