= Richmond-Burton Community High School =

Location
- 8311 State Route 31; Richmond, Illinois 60071; United States
- 42.4465°N 88.3107°W

Information
- Type: Public
- Motto: First Class
- Locale: District #157
- Superintendent: Thomas Lind
- Principal: Mike Baird
- Staff: 43.00 (FTE)
- Grades: 9-12
- Enrollment: 534 (2023-2024)
- Student to teacher ratio: 12.42
- Color
- Athletics: Click to see
- Mascot: Rocket
- Campus: Sub-Urban
- Website: rbchs.com

Richmond-Burton Community High School is a four-year public high school located in Richmond, Illinois, United States. One middle school (Nippersink Middle School) feeds into the high school.

== Community ==
Richmond is located on the Illinois-Wisconsin border. Richmond is about 44 miles south-southwest of Milwaukee and 64 miles northwest of Chicago.

== Academics ==
Illinois uses the ISAT and the PSAE tests to assess elementary through high school students' achievement in relation to performance standards expectations. In 2009 students at Richmond Burton outperformed the state average in all categories.

- Math 65% proficient (State Average 52%)
- Reading 65% proficient (State Average 57%)
- Science 67% proficient (State Average 51%)

== Activities ==
Richmond-Burton's athletic teams are known as the "Rockets" or for female teams the "Lady Rockets", and compete in the Kishwaukee River Conference.

Richmond-Burton's football team won the 2019 IHSA Class 4A state football championship.

- Marching Band
- Jazz Band
- Concert Band
- Baseball
- Basketball
- Cheerleading
- Choir
- Cross Country
- Dance Team
- Drama
- Football
- Golf
- ICTM math contest
- Soccer
- Softball
- Swimming
- Academic Team
- Track
- Volleyball
- Wrestling
- ACES (Academic Challenges in Engineering and Science)
