= Wilmot Union High School =

Location
- 11112 308th Ave; Wilmot, Wisconsin 53192; United States; 42.51544°N 88.18365°W

Information
- Type: Public
- Motto: Home of the Panthers
- Established: 1870s
- School district: Union
- Superintendent: Michael Plourde
- Principal: Rob Kreil
- Teaching staff: 57.17 (FTE)
- Grades: 9-12
- Enrollment: 922 (2023-2024)
- Student to teacher ratio: 16.13
- Campus type: suburban/rural
- Colors: Red, white, and black
- Athletics conference: Southern Lakes
- Sports: Baseball, basketball, cheerleading, cross country, football, volleyball, golf, soccer, swimming, tennis, track and field, wrestling, gymnastics, softball, dance, trap shooting, hockey
- Mascot: Wilber The Panther
- Team name: Panthers
- Rival: Westosha Central High School
- Communities served: Wilmot, Trevor, Randall, Silver Lake, Twin Lakes
- Feeder schools: Lakewood, Randall, Riverview, Trevor-Wilmot, Wheatland
- Website: wilmothighschool.com

Wilmot Union High School is a public secondary school located in Wilmot, Wisconsin, a community in the village of Salem Lakes in Kenosha County. Founded in the 1870s, the high school serves students grades 9 to 12 in the communities of Wilmot, Trevor, Randall, Silver Lake, Twin Lakes, and portions of Salem and Wheatland. Both the school and the community are named after the Wilmot Proviso, by David Wilmot.

The school is the sole member of the Wilmot Union High School District, and is fed by several elementary districts, including Randall School District, Twin Lakes School District, Silver Lake School District, Salem School District, Wheatland School District, and the Trevor-Wilmot Consolidated School District.

== Extracurricular activities ==
=== Music ===
- The Wilmot Guardsmen Marching Band includes all members of the Wilmot band program.
- The Wind Ensemble is an honors class made up of sophomores, juniors and seniors in the Wilmot band program. Membership is by audition only.
- The Panther Band and Red & White Concert Bands are open to all instrumental music students at Wilmot High School.
- The Jazz Ensemble is open to all sophomores, juniors and seniors in the Wilmot band program who are enrolled in one of the large ensembles.
- String Orchestra is open to all students who play violin, viola, cello or stringed bass.
- Small Pop Ensemble is a contemporary music ensemble made up entirely of students. The students create the music, rehearse and perform as a working band. The mission of the class is to offer college entrance level music theory to the students of Wilmot High School. The students then put that knowledge into practice to create the band. Small Pop Ensemble performs for the Wilmot Student Body, at the dinner concert "SENSATION" and tours the area grade schools.

On June 11, 2011, a student-led pop group won a statewide WSMA Battle Of The Bands competition, "The Les Paul Launchpad Competition", and earned the school's band program $5,000. The music department used the money to purchase four Yamaha electric pianos, and has obtained approval from the school board to create The Chase Promenade Midi and Piano Laboratory to house these instruments. The Laboratory will be used for classes such as Small Pop Ensemble.
