= Wilmot, Wisconsin =

- Former Census-designated place
- Location within Wisconsin Location within the United States
- Coordinates: 42°30′46″N 88°10′55″W
- Country: United States
- State: Wisconsin
- County: Kenosha

Area
  - Total: 1.383 sq mi (3.58 km^{2})
- Elevation: 748 ft (228 m)

Population (2010)
  - Total: 442
  - Density: 320/sq mi (123/km^{2})
- Time zone: UTC-6 (Central (CST))
  - Summer (DST): UTC-5 (CDT)
- ZIP code: 53192
- Area code: 262
- GNIS feature ID: 1576805

Wilmot (also Gilead) is a residential and business community in the village of Salem Lakes in southwestern Kenosha County, Wisconsin, United States. As of the 2010 census, prior to the incorporation into Salem Lakes, Wilmot was a census-designated place, with a population of 442. Since incorporation, Wilmot no longer has its own designated area for population statistics.

Gander Mountain, a sports/outdoors superstore, was founded in Wilmot, and was named for nearby Gander Mountain in neighboring Illinois.

Wilmot Union High School, Kenosha County Fairgrounds, the Wilmot Raceway, and the Wilmot Mountain Ski Resort are located in Wilmot.

== History ==
A post office has operated in Wilmot since 1849.
