= Mukwonago High School =

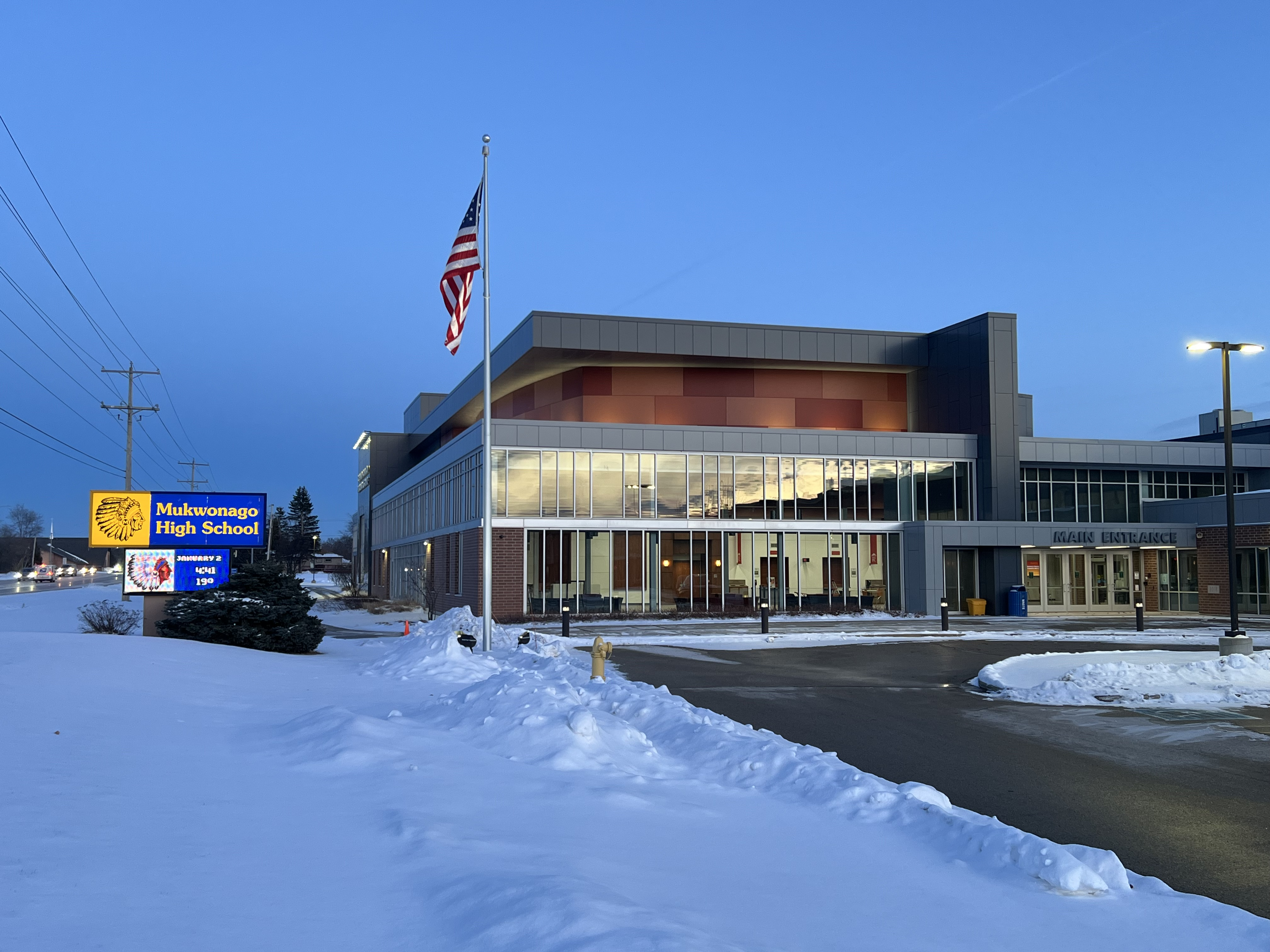

Location
- 605 West Veterans Way, Mukwonago, Wisconsin 53149; United States
- Coordinates: 42.87345°N 88.34771°W

Information
- Type: Public
- School district: Mukwonago Area School District
- Superintendent: Shawn McNulty
- Principal: James Darin
- Staff: 96.35 (FTE)
- Grades: 9–12
- Enrollment: 1,585 (2023–2024)
- Student to teacher ratio: 16.45
- Colors: Blue and gold
- Mascot: Indian
- Rival: Arrowhead High School
- Newspaper: MHS & Then Some
- Website: Mukwonago High School website

Mukwonago High School is located in Mukwonago in Waukesha County, Wisconsin, United States. It is part of the Mukwonago Area School District. Approximately 1700 students attend the school, which has over 150 staff members.

The original building at 308 Washington Avenue was listed on the National Register of Historic Places on October 7, 1994, but was delisted on May 12, 2009. The current building, erected in the 1970s, is at 605 W. School Road (Hwy NN) in Mukwonago.

The Mukwonago School District serves the villages of Big Bend and Mukwonago, the Town of Mukwonago, parts of the towns of Eagle, East Troy, Genesee, and Ottawa, part of the village of North Prairie, and part of the city of Muskego.

== Extracurricular activities ==
The 2004 Mukwonago Indians football team had an undefeated season ending with a victory over the Marshfield Tigers in the state championship. Other team state championships include girls' swimming (2011, 2012, 2013), girls' cross country (1994), boys' cross country (1964, 1966), boys' track (1964), as well as titles in debate and dance team.

MHS formerly had a competitive show choir, the women's-only "Starstruck", as well as the noncompetitive mixed-gender "Guys and Dolls".

=== FIRST Robotics ===
Mukwonago High School's Team 930, the Mukwonago BEARS, was founded in 2002. The team competes in the FIRST Robotics Competition against other teams from across the world. They have won multiple regional competitions, and in 2023 won their first Engineering Inspiration award for their work increasing STEM in the community. In 2019, Team 930 won the Archimedes Division at the FIRST Championship, finishing as world championship finalists.

Team 930 hosts the Mukwonago Robotics Offseason Competition (MROC), an offseason tournament. Started in 2022, the competition features teams from across the Midwest coming to compete on the field and for judged awards. The event features a donation drive that helps local charitable organizations.

The team runs several FIRST LEGO League Challenge teams and has hosted FIRST LEGO League regional, sectional and state tournaments since 2003.

== Mascot controversy ==
During the 2009–2010 school year, a Mukwonago High School senior filed a complaint with the Wisconsin Department of Public Instruction claiming that the Indians mascot and logo were racially discriminatory against Native Americans. The school fought the accusations, but on October 8, 2010, the department stripped the school of the nickname and logo. It called the mascot "unambiguously race-based". The case was then appealed by the School. The High School won the appeal, allowing it to keep both the name and mascot.

== Notable alumni ==
- Grace Beyer, Women's basketball player
- Dave Considine, politician
- Glenn Robert Davis, U.S. Representative
- Mary Beth Iagorashvili, Olympian in the modern pentathlon
- Angie Jakusz, contestant on the TV show Survivor
- Scott Jensen, former Assembly majority leader
- Nick Pearson, Olympian in speed skating, 2002 and 2010 Winter Games
- Brad Schimel, Wisconsin politician and lawyer
- Paul Stender, best known for designing, building and driving some of the most extreme and fastest Jet/Turbine Engine powered land vehicles in the world.
- Eric Szmanda, actor
- Fred Thomas (third baseman), former MLB player for the Boston Red Sox
