= Wisconsin School for the Deaf =

School in Delavan, Wisconsin, US

Coordinates: 42.6331°N 88.6436°W

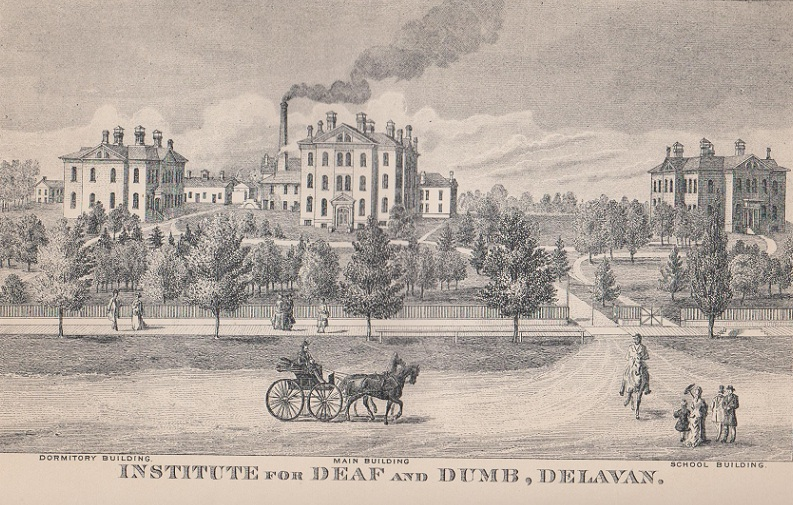
Phoenix Hall

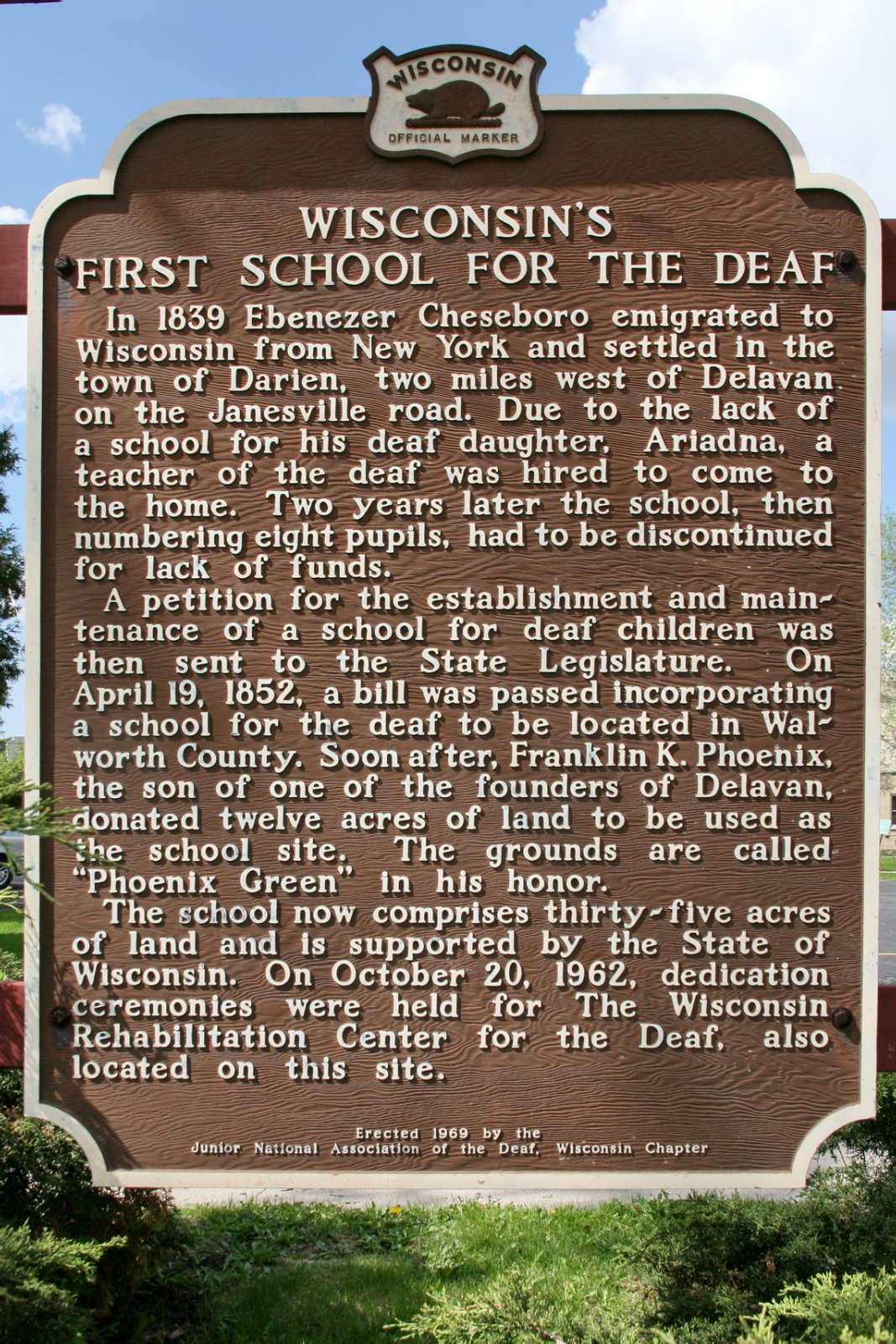
Historical marker

Wisconsin School for the Deaf (WSD) is located in Delavan, Wisconsin. The school has been serving Wisconsin’s deaf and hard of hearing children since 1852. WSD has an average enrollment of 130 students. The highest enrollment was 215 in 1980, and the lowest was 113 in 2007.

WSD is a residential school for deaf and hard of hearing students in the state of Wisconsin. It is operated under the direction of the Wisconsin Department of Public Instruction and provides educational services for deaf and hard of hearing students aged three to twenty-one. Phoenix Hall was listed on the National Register of Historic Places from March 1987 to April 21, 2014. The building was torn down several years prior to its removal from the National Register of Historic Places.

The Wisconsin School for the Deaf provides educational programs taught in American Sign Language. The school offers day settings for younger students and residential living for students who live thirty to forty minutes away. Huff Hall serves as the dormitory; it was built in 1974.
