= Clinton (village), Rock County, Wisconsin =

Clinton
- Village
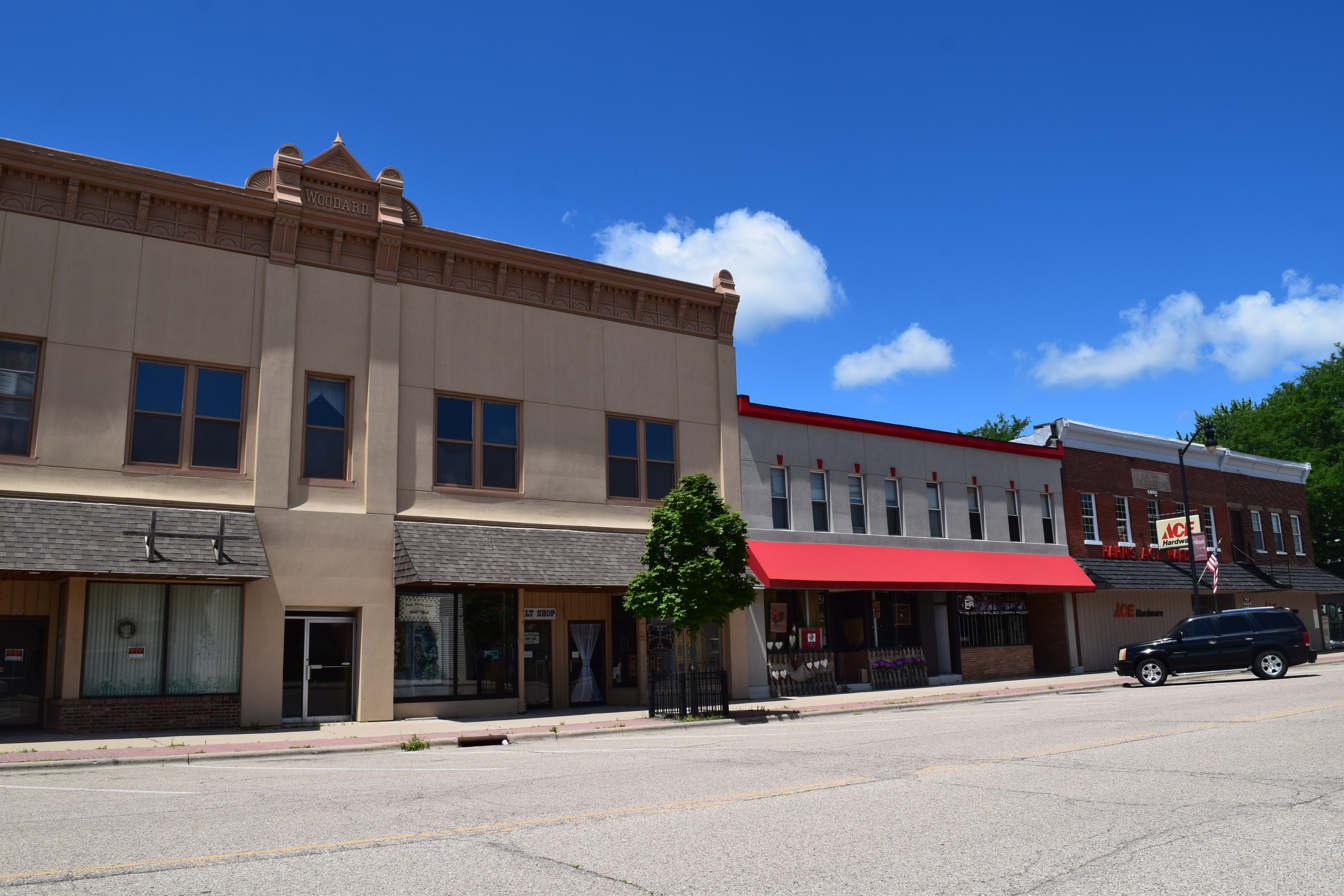
- Downtown Clinton, July 2020

- Location of Clinton in Rock County, Wisconsin.
- Coordinates: 42°33′24″N 88°51′52″W
- Country: United States
- State: Wisconsin
- County: Rock

Government
  - Type: Village Board
  - Village President: Thomas Peterson

Area
  - Total: 1.43 sq mi (3.71 km^{2})
  - Land: 1.43 sq mi (3.71 km^{2})
  - Water: 0 sq mi (0.00 km^{2})

Population (2020)
  - Total: 2,221
  - Density: 1,490/sq mi (577/km^{2})
- Time zone: UTC-6 (Central (CST))
  - Summer (DST): UTC-5 (CDT)
- Zip Code: 53525
- Area code: 608
- FIPS code: 55-15625
- GNIS feature ID: 1582983
- Website: Official website

Clinton is a village in Rock County, Wisconsin, United States. The population was 2,221 in the 2020 census. The village is located within the town of Clinton. The Norwegian-American Jefferson Prairie Settlement was located near the village.

== Geography ==
Clinton is located at 42°33′23″N 88°51′52″W (42.556596, -88.864453).

According to the United States Census Bureau, the village has a total area of 1.40 square miles (3.63 km^{2}), all land.

== Demographics ==
Historical population
Census	Pop.	Note	%±
1890	856		—
1900	871		1.8%
1910	897		3.0%
1920	938		4.6%
1930	902		−3.8%
1940	903		0.1%
1950	1,138		26.0%
1960	1,274		12.0%
1970	1,333		4.6%
1980	1,751		31.4%
1990	1,849		5.6%
2000	2,162		16.9%
2010	2,154		−0.4%
2020	2,221		3.1%
U.S. Decennial Census

=== 2010 census ===
As of the census of 2010, there were 2,154 people, 801 households, and 546 families living in the village. The population density was 1,538.6 inhabitants per square mile (594.1/km^{2}). There were 872 housing units at an average density of 622.9 per square mile (240.5/km^{2}). The racial makeup of the village was 92.9% White, 0.6% African American, 0.1% Native American, 0.3% Asian, 4.3% from other races, and 1.8% from two or more races. Hispanic or Latino of any race were 8.0% of the population.

There were 801 households, of which 37.7% had children under the age of 18 living with them, 49.7% were married couples living together, 13.1% had a female householder with no husband present, 5.4% had a male householder with no wife present, and 31.8% were non-families. 27.3% of all households were made up of individuals, and 11.5% had someone living alone who was 65 years of age or older. The average household size was 2.58 and the average family size was 3.16.

The median age in the village was 36.6 years. 27.6% of residents were under the age of 18; 7.4% were between the ages of 18 and 24; 24.4% were from 25 to 44; 25.5% were from 45 to 64, and 15% were 65 years of age or older. The gender makeup of the village was 48.5% male and 51.5% female.

=== 2000 census ===
As of the census of 2000, there were 2,162 people, 771 households, and 541 families living in the village. The population density was 1,652.0 people per square mile (637.2/km^{2}). There were 815 housing units at an average density of 622.7/sq mi (240.2/km^{2}). The racial makeup of the village was 96.48% White, 0.23% Black or African American, 0.19% Native American, 0.42% Asian, 1.85% from other races, and 0.83% from two or more races. 3.19% of the population were Hispanic or Latino of any race.

There were 771 households, out of which 38.1% had children under the age of 18 living with them, 55.0% were married couples living together, 11.4% had a female householder with no husband present, and 29.8% were non-families. 24.8% of all households were made up of individuals, and 12.3% had someone living alone who was 65 years of age or older. The average household size was 2.70 and the average family size was 3.27.

In the village, the population was spread out, with 29.7% under the age of 18, 8.2% from 18 to 24, 27.6% from 25 to 44, 19.8% from 45 to 64, and 14.7% who were 65 years of age or older. The median age was 35 years. For every 100 females, there were 90.1 males. For every 100 females age 18 and over, there were 83.1 males.

The median income for a household in the village was $45,987, and the median income for a family was $54,514. Males had a median income of $38,167 versus $25,189 for females. The per capita income for the village was $18,015. About 4.5% of families and 7.2% of the population were below the poverty line, including 6.3% of those under age 18 and 13.7% of those aged 65 or over.

== Transportation ==
Clinton was served by the Chicago, Milwaukee, St. Paul and Pacific Railroad, better known as the Milwaukee Road, and the Chicago and North Western Railroad (C&NW). It was on the Racine & Southwestern branch line of the Milwaukee Road and on the C&NW line between Harvard, Illinois, and Janesville, Wisconsin. In its 1980 bankruptcy, the Milwaukee Road disposed of the Southwestern Line. The Union Pacific Railroad, which took over the C&NW, operates today in Clinton on former C&NW tracks and on a remnant of the former Milwaukee Road west to Beloit, where it provides a rail connection to Fairbanks-Morse.

== Education ==
The Clinton Community School District provides K-12 public education.

== Events ==
Clinton is the home of the annual Stoopball League of America (SLA) championship in July. "Taste of Clinton" held each year Father's Day weekend.

== Notable residents ==
- Realf Ottesen Brandt, Lutheran minister
- William H. Hurlbut, Wisconsin State Representative
- Henry A. Moehlenpah, political candidate, banker, and member of the Federal Reserve Board of Governors
- Joe Shear, stock car racer
- Peter Shorts, former NFL player
- Cornelius Mortimer Treat, Wisconsin State Assembly (1862–63)

== See also ==
- List of villages in Wisconsin
