= Westosha Central High School =

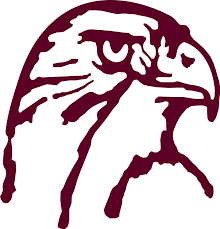
- WCHS logo as of 2021

Location
- 24617 75th Street; Salem, Kenosha, Wisconsin 53168; United States
- Coordinates: 42.56728°N 88.10715°W

Information
- Type: Public, coeducational high school
- Established: 1952
- School district: Westosha
- Superintendent: John Gendron
- Principal: Kevin Kitslaar
- Staff: Total staff - 124
- Faculty: 80 (2019)
- Teaching staff: 68.50 (FTE)
- Grades: 9-12
- Average class size: 18
- Student to teacher ratio: 18.66
- Colors: Maroon and silver
- Song: "Go You Falcons!"
- Athletics conference: Southern Lakes
- Sports: Baseball, basketball, cheerleading, cross country, football, volleyball, golf, soccer, swimming, tennis, track and field, wrestling, gymnastics, softball, dance, trap shooting, hockey, bowling
- Mascot: Falcon
- Team name: Falcons
- Rival: Wilmot Union High School
- National ranking: 3,173
- School fees: $55 plus class materials depending on course
- Communities served: Wheatland, Salem, Brighton, Paris, Bristol, Paddock Lake, and Trevor and open enrollment students from Kenosha and Racine
- Feeder schools: Wheatland, Salem, Brighton, Paris, Bristol
- Website: http://www.westosha.k12.wi.us

Westosha Central High School is a public high school located in the village of Paddock Lake, Wisconsin, United States, near the border of the village of Salem Lakes. It serves students in grades 9 through 12 in the communities of Wheatland, Salem, Brighton, Paris, Paddock Lake, Trevor, and Bristol, and open enrollment students from Kenosha and Racine. Parts of Trevor, Wheatland, and Salem are split between Central and neighboring Wilmot Union High School. The school was founded in 1952.

== History ==
Westosha Central High School was originally named Central High School, and by the late 1950s it came to be known as Salem Central High School. In the 1980s, the district name was changed to Central High School District of Westosha. The addition of the term "Westosha" refers to the fact that the school was west of Kenosha as well as differentiating it from Walter Reuther Central High School, a special curriculum high school in nearby Kenosha. Westosha Central High School is usually referred to as "Central", whereas Walter Reuther Central High School is often called simply "Reuther."

In 2022, the school updated its name to Westosha Central High School. The district name also changed to Westosha Central High School District.

== Notable alumnus ==
- Ben Rothwell, graduated in 2001, professional mixed martial artist, current UFC Heavyweight
