= Waterford, Wisconsin =

- Village
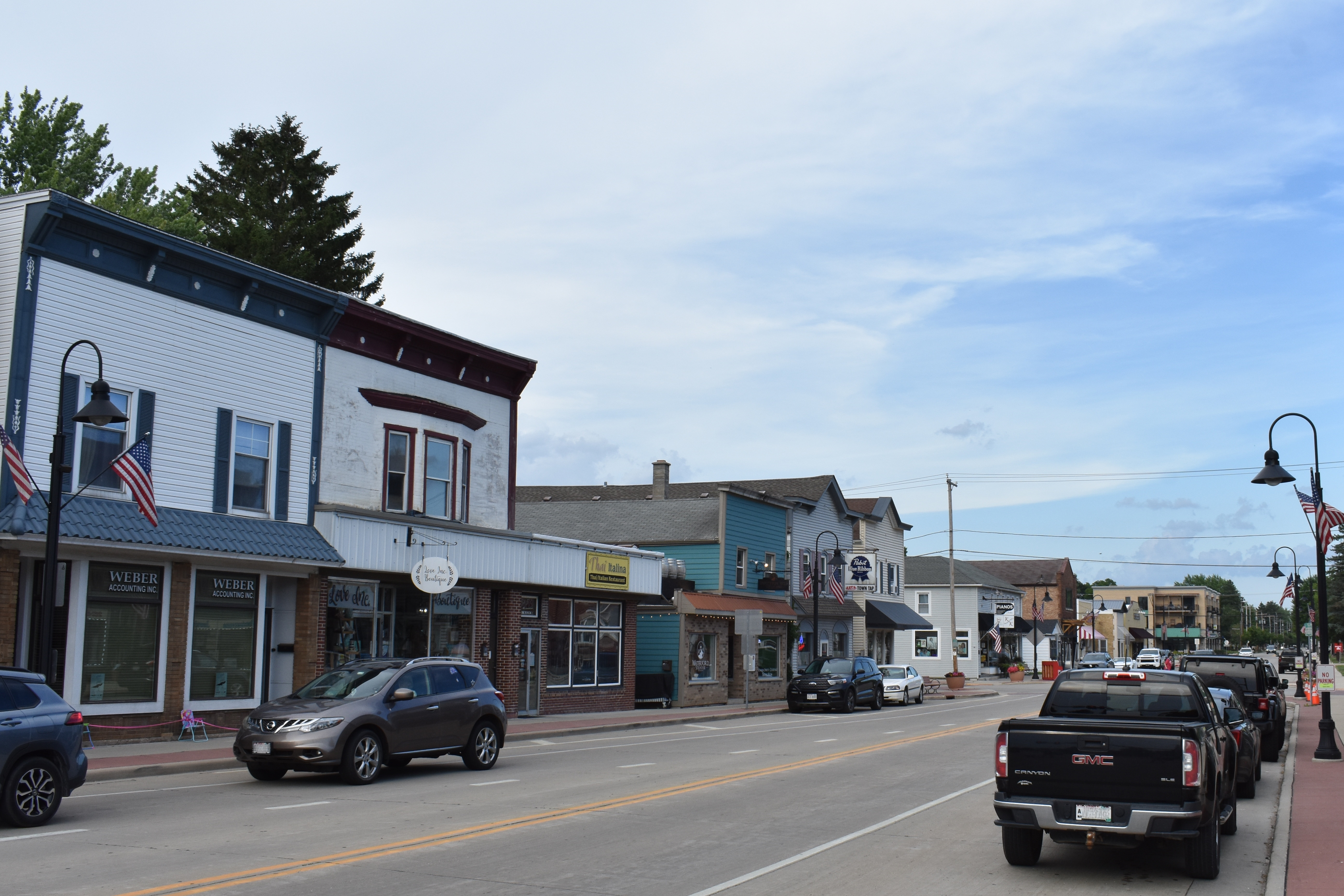
- Downtown Waterford

- Location of Waterford in Racine County, Wisconsin.
- Coordinates: 42°47′59″N 88°14′9″W
- Country: United States
- State: Wisconsin
- County: Racine
- Established: 1906

Area
  - Total: 2.55 sq mi (6.61 km^{2})
  - Land: 2.44 sq mi (6.33 km^{2})
  - Water: 0.11 sq mi (0.28 km^{2})
- Elevation: 827 ft (252 m)

Population (2020)
  - Total: 5,542
  - Density: 2,277.6/sq mi (879.37/km^{2})
- Time zone: UTC-6 (Central (CST))
  - Summer (DST): UTC-5 (CDT)
- ZIP Code: 53185
- Area code: 262
- FIPS code: 55-83850
- GNIS feature ID: 1576287
- Website: www.waterfordwi.gov

Waterford is a village in Racine County, Wisconsin, United States. The population was 5,542 at the 2020 census.

== Geography ==
According to the United States Census Bureau, the village has an area of 2.68 square miles (6.94 km^{2}), of which 2.58 square miles (6.68 km^{2}) is land and 0.10 square miles (0.26 km^{2}) is water.

=== Climate ===
Waterford experiences four distinct seasons, with wide variations in precipitation and temperature.

== Demographics ==
Historical population
Census	Pop.	Note	%±
1860	418		—
1870	545		30.4%
1890	448		—
1910	581		—
1920	668		15.0%
1930	739		10.6%
1940	786		6.4%
1950	1,100		39.9%
1960	1,500		36.4%
1970	1,922		28.1%
1980	2,051		6.7%
1990	2,431		18.5%
2000	4,048		66.5%
2010	5,368		32.6%
2020	5,542		3.2%
U.S. Decennial Census

=== 2020 census ===
As of the 2020 census, Waterford had a population of 5,542. The median age was 44.0 years. 23.0% of residents were under the age of 18 and 21.0% of residents were 65 years of age or older. For every 100 females there were 89.3 males, and for every 100 females age 18 and over there were 88.9 males age 18 and over.

100.0% of residents lived in urban areas, while 0.0% lived in rural areas.

There were 2,248 households in Waterford, of which 30.2% had children under the age of 18 living in them. Of all households, 51.6% were married-couple households, 14.8% were households with a male householder and no spouse or partner present, and 26.9% were households with a female householder and no spouse or partner present. About 27.2% of all households were made up of individuals and 14.0% had someone living alone who was 65 years of age or older.

There were 2,370 housing units, of which 5.1% were vacant. The homeowner vacancy rate was 1.3% and the rental vacancy rate was 2.4%.

Racial composition as of the 2020 census
Race	Number	Percent
White	5,169	93.3%
Black or African American	21	0.4%
American Indian and Alaska Native	9	0.2%
Asian	45	0.8%
Native Hawaiian and Other Pacific Islander	1	0.0%
Some other race	57	1.0%
Two or more races	240	4.3%
Hispanic or Latino (of any race)	249	4.5%

=== Demographic estimates ===
As of 2018 estimates, the population density was 2266.05 people/mi^{2}. There are 3,861 adults. The median age of males is 36.1 compared to the median age of females, which is 41 years old.

The average household size was 2.61 people per household. The median rent was $938/month. The median house has 5.4 rooms, and has a value of $194,500. The median income for households in Waterford, Wisconsin is $77,973, while the mean household income is $85,805.

Of the 5,571 people, 0.80% have an education level of less than 9th grade, 5.40% are 9th to 12th grade, 33.74% are a high school graduate, 20.83% have some college education, 11.11% have an associate degree, 22.71% have a bachelor's degree, and 5.40% have a graduate degree.

=== 2000 census ===
At the 2000 census there were 4,048 people, 1,561 households, and 1,139 families in the village. The population density was 1,645.1 people per square mile (635.3/km^{2}). There were 1,628 housing units at an average density of 661.6 per square mile (255.5/km^{2}). The racial makeup of the village was 98.15% White, 0.27% Black or African American, 0.22% Native American, 0.20% Asian, 0.42% from other races, and 0.74% from two or more races. 1.88% of the population were Hispanic or Latino of any race. Of the 1,561 households 36.9% had children under the age of 18 living with them, 59.8% were married couples living together, 9.0% had a female householder with no husband present, and 27.0% were non-families. 21.9% of households were one person and 8.5% were one person aged 65 or older. The average household size was 2.59 and the average family size was 3.03.

The age distribution was 28.4% under the age of 18, 5.7% from 18 to 24, 32.7% from 25 to 44, 21.2% from 45 to 64, and 12.1% 65 or older. The median age was 35 years. For every 100 females, there were 97.3 males. For every 100 females age 18 and over, there were 96.5 males.

The median household income was $55,804 and the median family income was $64,453. Males had a median income of $44,417 versus $27,917 for females. The per capita income for the village was $22,741. About 0.9% of families and 3.0% of the population were below the poverty line, including 0.6% of those under age 18 and 7.2% of those age 65 or over.

== Notable people ==
- Sam Alvey, mixed martial artist
- Charlie Ganzel, born in Waterford, major league baseball player
- Barbara Lawton, lieutenant governor of Wisconsin
- Walter J. Rush, Wisconsin state senator
- Lynn E. Stalbaum, U.S. representative
- Victor Willard, Wisconsin state senator

== See also ==
- Waterford Union High School
- List of villages in Wisconsin
