= East Troy High School =

High school in Wisconsin, United States

Coordinates: 42.78744°N 88.41733°W

Location
- 3128 Graydon Avenue; East Troy, (Walworth County), Wisconsin 53120; United States

Information
- Type: Public high school
- Principal: Stacey Kuehn
- Staff: 31.55 (on an FTE basis)
- Enrollment: 475 (2023–2024)
- Student to teacher ratio: 15.06
- Colors: Black and yellow
- Fight song: "Go U Northwestern"
- Athletics conference: Rock Valley
- Nickname: Trojans

East Troy High School is a high school in East Troy, Wisconsin. Enrollment ranges between 500 and 650 students. The team mascot is the Trojan, adopted from the ancient city of Troy.

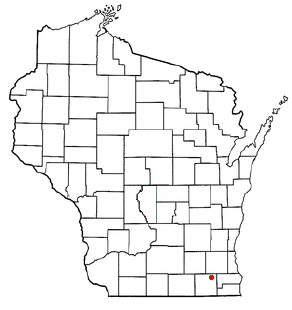
East Troy

== Notable alumni ==
- Dean Dingman, football player and coach
- Richard A. Flintrop, former Wisconsin state assembly member
- Isabella Hofmann, actress
- Cody Horlacher, lawyer and politician
- Mark Neumann, politician
- A. J. Vukovich, professional baseball player in the Arizona Diamondbacks organization
