= Clinton High School (Clinton, Wisconsin) =

Public high school in Clinton, Wisconsin, United States

Coordinates: 42.56316°N 88.85714°W

Clinton Junior-Senior High School

Location
- 112 Milwaukee Road; Clinton, (Rock County), Wisconsin 53525; United States

Information
- Type: Public high school
- Principal: Erika Stewart
- Staff: 25.11 (FTE)
- Enrollment: 322 (2023-2024)
- Student to teacher ratio: 12.82
- Colors: Navy and white
- Fight song: "Illinois Loyalty"
- Athletics conference: Rock Valley
- Nickname: Cougars
- Website: https://www.clinton.k12.wi.us/schools/high/

Clinton High School is a public high school located at 112 Milwaukee Road in Clinton, Wisconsin. Serving approximately 361 students in grades 9–12, it is part of the Clinton Community School District.

== Athletics ==
Clinton's athletic mascot is Clint the Cougar, and they have been members of the Rock Valley Conference since 1969 (when it was founded as the Central Suburban Conference).

=== Athletic conference affiliation history ===
- Southeastern Wisconsin Conference (1928-1937)
- Southern Regional Conference (1937-1958)
- Southeastern Wisconsin Conference (1958-1963)
- Indian Trails Conference (1963-1969)
- Central Suburban Conference (1969-1977)
- Rock Valley Conference (1977–present)
