= Palmyra-Eagle Area School District =

School district in Wisconsin, United States

- 123 Burr Oak St Palmyra, WI, 53156

District information
- Grades: K4-12
- Schools: 4
- NCES District ID: 5511350

Students and staff
- Students: 521 (2024–25)
- Teachers: 57.06 (on an FTE basis)
- Student–teacher ratio: 9.13
- District mascot: Panther
- Colors: Purple and White

Other information
- District Administrator: Ryan Krohn
- Website: www.peasd.org

The Palmyra-Eagle Area School District is a school district in the U.S. state of Wisconsin that serves Jefferson, Walworth, and Waukesha counties. The district serves students from the villages of Palmyra and Eagle and the towns of Palmyra, Eagle, La Grange, and Sullivan.

== Schools ==
- Eagle Elementary (PK–5)
- Palmyra-Eagle Montessori School (PK–6)
- Palmyra-Eagle High (9–12)
- Palmyra-Eagle Middle (6–8)

== Administration ==
- Ryan Krohn - District Administrator
