= Big Foot High School =

Location
- 401 Devils Ln; Walworth, Wisconsin 53184; United States
- Coordinates: 42°31′37″N 88°35′40″W

Information
- Type: Public secondary
- Established: 1959
- Administrator: Doug Parker
- Principal: Jeremy Andersen
- Teaching staff: 31.83 (FTE)
- Grades: 9–12
- Enrollment: 449 (2023-2024)
- Student to teacher ratio: 14.11
- Colors: scarlet and silver
- Yearbook: Totem
- Website: http://www.bigfoot.k12.wi.us/

Big Foot High School (BFHS) is a comprehensive four-year public high school located in Wisconsin's South Central Walworth County in the Village of Walworth. A union high school, BFHS operates as a grade 9–12 district with students coming from four K-8 districts. BFHS is governed by a separate, elected five-member board of education. The BFHS union district serves families from the villages of Fontana, Sharon and Walworth; and the townships of Walworth, Delavan, Linn and Sharon.

BFHS is named after the Potawatomi leader Big Foot (Maumksuck) who had six toes and lived along the banks of Geneva Lake (originally known as Big Foot Lake) until his tribe was forcibly relocated by the United States government in 1836.

== Extracurricular activities ==
Big Foot's football team went to the Division 4 state championship game at Camp Randall Stadium in 2008, but lost to Wautoma High School by a score of 20–0. In 2009, the team played in the championship game the second consecutive year, this time facing Kewaunee High School. Big Foot won by a score of 42–13, making it the first State Football title in school history.

== Statistics ==
- Enrollment: 449 (2023–24)
- District Administrator: Mr. Doug Parker
- Principal: Mr. Jeremy Andersen
- Assistant Principals: Ms. Bailey Racky, Mr. Mike Welden
- Coeducational: yes
- Colors: Scarlet and Silver

== Notable alumni ==
- Tyler August, speaker pro tempore of the Wisconsin State Assembly
- Travis Frederick, center for the Dallas Cowboys of the National Football League (NFL)
