= Williams Bay High School =

High school in Wisconsin, United States

Coordinates: 42°34′35.8″N 88°33′49.6″W

Location
- 500 West Geneva Street; Williams Bay, (Walworth County), Wisconsin 53191; United States

Information
- Type: Public high school
- Principal: Emily Soley-Johnson
- Staff: 14.97 (FTE)
- Enrollment: 180 (2023-2024)
- Student to teacher ratio: 12.02
- Colors: Black and orange
- Fight song: "Fight For The Orange & Black"
- Athletics conference: Trailways
- Nickname: Bulldogs
- Website: middle-high.williamsbayschools.org

Williams Bay High School is a 4-year public high school located in Williams Bay, Wisconsin. The school enrollment is approximately 181 students. The school district serves the village of Williams Bay, and the towns of Delavan, Linn, Walworth, and Geneva.

== History ==
Following the school shooting at Columbine High School, Williams Bay High School took part in a simulated school shooting to train local law enforcement. The drill was filmed and along with interviews of school officials and community members was shown on the NBC Nightly News with Tom Brokaw.

== Academics ==
Williams Bay High School is has AP and honors classes along with electives that range from technical education classes, to Family and Consumer Education (FACE) classes, along with art classes.

== Extracurricular activities ==
=== Athletics ===
The WBHS sports teams are nicknamed the "Bulldogs" and sport the school colors orange and black. The Bulldogs compete in WIAA Division 4 in the Trailways Conference. The girls' volleyball team won the state championship in 2003, 2004, and 2005, and were runners up in 2002. The softball team won the state championship in 2007 and took the conference title in 2008. In football the Bulldogs compete in the Trailways Small School division, and are a WIAA division 7 program. WBHS teams up with Big Foot High School for boys' and girls' soccer, boys' wrestling, equestrian, and boys' and girls' tennis. The Bay also teams up with Badger High School in Lake Geneva for boys' and girls' swim and boy's and girls' skiing.

== Recognition ==
In 2014, Newsweek ranked Williams Bay High School #1 in the country.
