= List of FieldTurf installations =

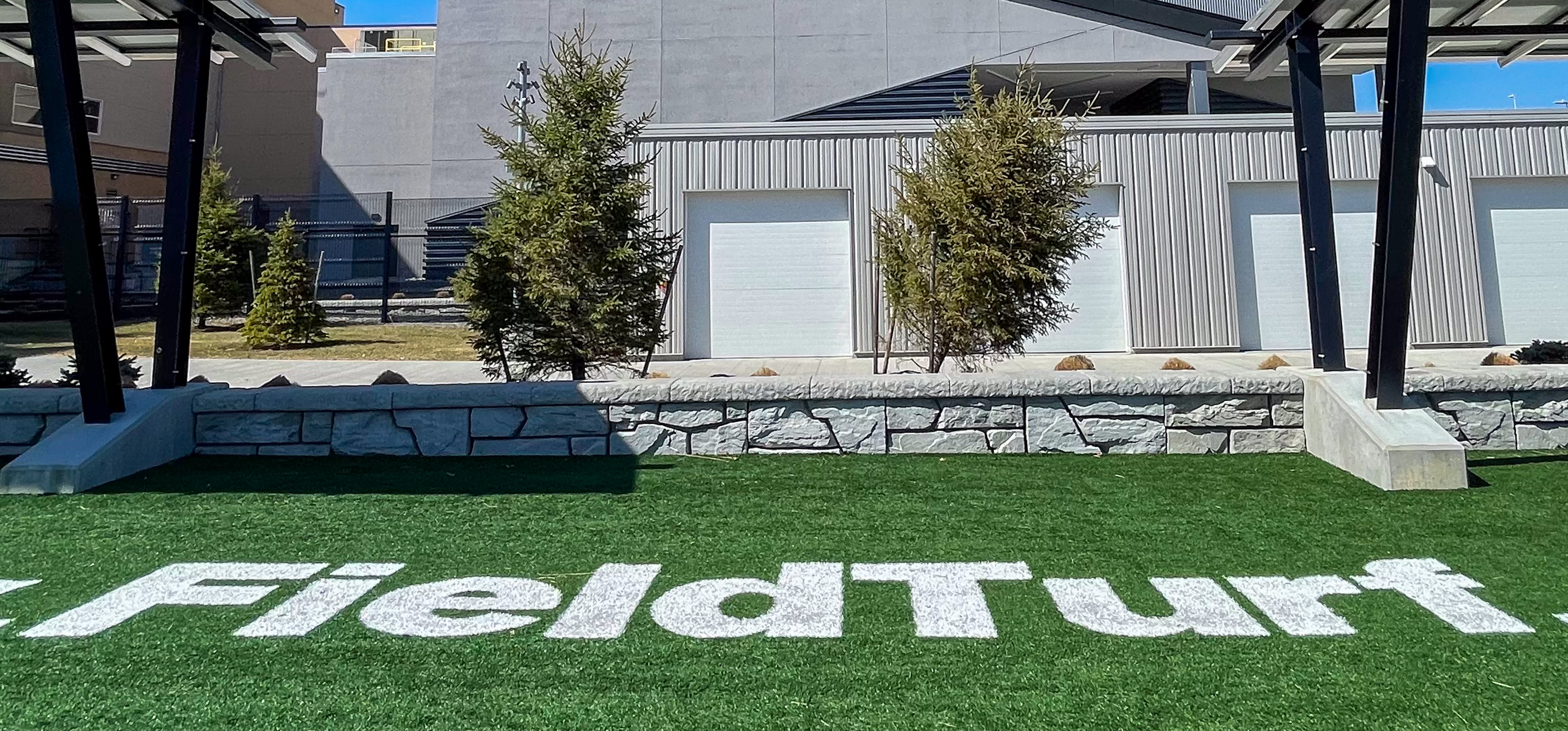
FieldTurf promotion at Gillette Stadium

In 1999 the University of Nebraska–Lincoln installed FieldTurf in Memorial Stadium. In 2006, Nebraska installed new FieldTurf that alternates between two shades of green every five yards. Texas Tech University installed FieldTurf in Galaxy Stadium. Nevada installed FieldTurf at its Mackay Stadium in 2000. The playing surface had been natural grass for 34 seasons.

FieldTurf was installed at Qwest Field (originally Seahawks Stadium) in 2002. The original plans called for a natural grass field at the new stadium, but due to the favorable reactions from players while playing at Husky Stadium, the Seahawks had FieldTurf installed instead.

On Tuesday, April 29, 2003, the Georgia World Congress Center Authority announced that it had selected FieldTurf as the new surface for the Georgia Dome, replacing the AstroTurf surface in use at the Dome since its inception in 1992.

Washington State University installed FieldTurf at its Martin Stadium in 2000. The University of Oregon installed NexTurf in Autzen Stadium in 2001 but the surface did not perform as expected and during remodeling in 2002 it was removed and replaced with FieldTurf. The University of Utah installed FieldTurf in 2002 and replaced it in 2009. Colorado State installed FieldTurf at its Hughes Stadium in 2006. The playing surface had been natural grass for 38 seasons.

The New England Patriots installed FieldTurf midway into the 2006 NFL season. The installation was made during a week when the team was on the road.

In 2004, Rutgers Stadium in Piscataway, New Jersey installed FieldTurf where the Rutgers Scarlet Knights football team plays. In 2007, the Saskatchewan Roughriders, a Canadian Football League (CFL) team, installed FieldTurf in Mosaic Stadium at Taylor Field. In April 2008, FieldTurf was installed at the new baseball stadium of Calvert Hall High School in Towson, Maryland, designed by Baltimore Orioles baseball great Cal Ripken.

== National Football League (NFL) ==
- CenturyLink Field in Seattle, Washington – 2002, 2008
- Ford Field in Detroit, Michigan – 2002 (original), 2013
- Georgia Dome in Atlanta – 2003, 2011
- Gillette Stadium in Foxborough, Massachusetts – 2006 (Nov. 26)
- Lucas Oil Stadium in Indianapolis, Indiana – 2008
- Mercedes-Benz Stadium in Atlanta – 2017

== NFL practice facilities ==
- Atlanta Falcons
- Cleveland Browns, Lou Groza Center
- Detroit Lions, Lions Practice Facility and Headquarters in Allen Park, Michigan
- Green Bay Packers, Don Hutson Center
- Jacksonville Jaguars
- New England Patriots
- San Diego Chargers, Chargers Park
- Seattle Seahawks, VMAC Practice Facility
- Washington Commanders

== Canada ==
- Clarke Park in Edmonton, Alberta
- Commonwealth Stadium in Edmonton, Alberta
- Edmonton Soccer Dome in Edmonton, Alberta
- Investors Group Field in Winnipeg, Manitoba
- King George V Park in St. John's, Newfoundland
- McMahon Stadium in Calgary, Alberta
- Molson Stadium in Montreal
- Mosaic Stadium at Taylor Field in Regina, Saskatchewan (2007)
- Percy Perry Stadium / Town Centre Park (4 fields) in Coquitlam, British Columbia
- Port Moody Field in Port Moody, British Columbia
- Raymond Field at Acadia University in Wolfville, Nova Scotia
- TD Place Stadium in Ottawa, Ontario
- University of Alberta in Edmonton, Alberta
- University of Western Ontario (TD Waterhouse Stadium) in London, Ontario
- Veterans Memorial Field in New Waterford, Nova Scotia
- Warrior Field at University of Waterloo in Waterloo, Ontario
- Varsity Stadium in Toronto, Ontario

== Major League Soccer ==
- Gillette Stadium in Foxborough, Massachusetts
- CenturyLink Field in Seattle
- Providence Park in Portland, Oregon

== Worldwide ==
- Oriel Park in Dundalk, Ireland
- Estadio Ricardo Saprissa in San José, Costa Rica
- Luzhniki Stadium in Moscow, Russia
- Borås Arena in Borås, Sweden
- New Douglas Park in Hamilton, Scotland (since replaced with grass and now Greenfields MX turf)
- Tokyo Dome in Tokyo, Japan
- Cardiff Arms Park in Cardiff, Wales
- Rugby Park in Kilmarnock, Scotland
- Priory Lane in Eastbourne, England

== U.S. colleges ==
- Abel Stadium at Nebraska Wesleyan University in Lincoln, Nebraska
- Adams Field at Wayne State University in Detroit – 2006
- AJ Knight Field at Worcester Polytechnic Institute in Worcester, Massachusetts – 2007
- Al F. Caniglia Field at University of Nebraska Omaha in Omaha, Nebraska
- Albertsons Stadium (originally Bronco Stadium) at Boise State University in Boise, Idaho (continuing the stadium's uniqueness, the surface is colored blue)
- Andy Coakley Field (baseball) at Columbia University in New York City
- Andy Kerr Stadium at Colgate University in Hamilton, New York
- Arizona Stadium at The University of Arizona in Tucson, Arizona – 2013
- Art Keller Field at Carthage College in Kenosha, Wisconsin
- Autzen Stadium at the University of Oregon in Eugene, Oregon – 2002 – (Replaced NexTurf after one season of use)
- Banta Bowl at Lawrence University in Appleton, Wisconsin
- BB&T Field at Wake Forest University in Winston-Salem, North Carolina – Summer 2006
- Biddle Field at Dickinson College in Carlisle, Pennsylvania – 2008
- Bob Ford Field at University at Albany in Albany, New York – 2013
- Bob and Eveline Roberts P'10 Field at Steinbrenner Stadium at the Massachusetts Institute of Technology in Cambridge, Massachusetts
- Brandenburg Field at Pittsburg State University in Pittsburg, Kansas
- Brown University: Berylson Family Fields (2007) and Richard Gouse Field at Brown Stadium (2021) in Providence, Rhode Island
- Bruce R. Deaton Memorial Field (football, soccer) at Saint Xavier University in Chicago – 2006
- Bridgeforth Stadium at James Madison University in Harrisonburg, Virginia
- Brigham Field at Huskie Stadium at Northern Illinois University in DeKalb, Illinois – 2001, 2009
- Buchanan Family Field in Washington, D.C.
- Butler Bowl at Butler University in Indianapolis, Indiana
- Cameron Stadium at Washington & Jefferson College in Washington, Pennsylvania
- Camp Randall Stadium at the University of Wisconsin in Madison, Wisconsin – 2003, 2012
- Capital One Field at Byrd Stadium at the University of Maryland in College Park, Maryland – 2012 – replaced natural grass
- Cardinal Stadium at the University of Louisville in Louisville, Kentucky
- Carrier Dome at Syracuse University in Syracuse, New York
- Carson Park (Eau Claire, Wisconsin)
- Christy Mathewson–Memorial Stadium at Bucknell University in Lewisburg, Pennsylvania
- Commonwealth Stadium at University of Kentucky in Lexington, Kentucky – 2015 – replaced natural grass
- Owen T. Carroll Field (baseball, soccer) at Seton Hall University in South Orange, New Jersey – 2006
- Case Western Reserve University Stadium at Case Western Reserve University in Cleveland, Ohio
- Class of 1952 Stadium at Princeton University in Princeton, New Jersey
- Cougar Field at the University of Houston in Houston, Texas – 2013
- D. Lloyd Wilson Field in Hastings, Nebraska
- Darrell K Royal–Texas Memorial Stadium at the University of Texas in Austin, Texas – 2009 – replaced natural grass
- Dix Stadium at Kent State University in Kent, Ohio
- Don and Nona Williams Stadium at University of Wisconsin-Stout in Menomonie, Wisconsin
- Donald J. Schneider Stadium at St. Norbert College in De Pere, Wisconsin
- Depew Field (baseball) at Bucknell University in Lewisburg, Pennsylvania
- Drake Stadium at Drake University in Des Moines, Iowa
- Dudley Field at Vanderbilt University in Nashville, Tennessee
- East Campus Stadium at Rensselaer Polytechnic Institute in Troy, New York
- Ellis Field at Urbana University in Urbana, Ohio
- Elwood Olsen Stadium at Morningside University in Sioux City, Iowa
- Eringhaus Field (soccer) at University of North Carolina at Chapel Hill in Chapel Hill, North Carolina
- Falcon Baseball Field at the United States Air Force Academy in Colorado Springs, Colorado
- Falcon Stadium at the United States Air Force Academy in Colorado Springs, Colorado – 2006 – replaced natural grass
- Foothill College in Los Altos Hills, California
- Faurot Field at the University of Missouri in Columbia, Missouri
- Fisher Field at Lafayette College in Easton, Pennsylvania
- Foster Field at the University of Nebraska at Kearney in Kearney, Nebraska
- FIU Stadium at Florida International University in Miami, Florida
- Fred Selfe Stadium at Emory and Henry University in Emory, Virginia
- Gayle and Tom Benson Stadium at the University of the Incarnate Word in San Antonio, Texas – 2018
- Georgia State Stadium in Atlanta – 2017
- Gettler Stadium in Cincinnati
- Gesling Stadium at Carnegie Mellon University in Pittsburgh, Pennsylvania
- Goerke Field at University of Wisconsin - Stevens Point in Stevens Point, Wisconsin
- Goss Stadium at Oregon State University in Corvallis, Oregon (baseball – infield only)
- Greer Field at Turchin Stadium at Tulane University in New Orleans, Louisiana – 2007
- Growney Stadium at St. John Fisher University in Rochester, New York – 2005
- Hank Crisp Indoor Facility at the University of Alabama in Tuscaloosa, Alabama
- Harvard Stadium at Harvard University in Allston, Massachusetts
- Hollingsworth Field at Vaught–Hemingway Stadium at the University of Mississippi in Oxford, Mississippi – 2009 – replaced AstroPlay
- Husky Stadium at the University of Washington in Seattle, Washington – 2000, 2009, 2013 (the surface's success at this stadium led to its selection by the Seattle Seahawks for use at Qwest Field) – 2002
- Hotchkiss Field at Gallaudet University in Washington, D.C. – completed in Fall 2008
- Houchens Industries–L. T. Smith Stadium at Western Kentucky University in Bowling Green, Kentucky
- Hansen Stadium at Utah Tech University in St. George, Utah
- Illinois Field (baseball) at the University of Illinois at Urbana–Champaign in Champaign, Illinois – 2007
- Ingalls Field at Ripon College (Wisconsin) in Ripon, Wisconsin
- Jake Christiansen Stadium at Concordia College in Moorhead, Minnesota – 2010
- Jim Sweeney Field at Bulldog Stadium at California State University, Fresno in Fresno, California – 2011
- Joan C. Edwards Stadium at Marshall University in Huntington, West Virginia – 2005 – replaced AstroTurf
- Joe Walton Stadium at Robert Morris University in Moon Township, Pennsylvania
- Jonah Field at War Memorial Stadium at the University of Wyoming in Laramie, Wyoming
- Galaxy Stadium at Texas Tech University in Lubbock, Texas
- Kelly/Shorts Stadium at Central Michigan University in Mount Pleasant, Michigan – 2004
- Kessler Field at Monmouth University in West Long Branch, New Jersey
- Kinnick Stadium at the University of Iowa in Iowa City, Iowa
- Krenzler Field (soccer) at Cleveland State University in Cleveland, Ohio
- Kidd Brewer Stadium at Appalachian State University in Boone, North Carolina – 2003
  - Sofield Indoor Center at Appalachian State University in Boone, North Carolina – 2007
- Ladd–Peebles Stadium – municipally owned stadium in Mobile, Alabama hosting the Senior Bowl, GoDaddy.com Bowl, Pioneer Bowl and home to the University of South Alabama Jaguars football team
- Legion Field – a municipally owned stadium in Birmingham, Alabama used by the University of Alabama at Birmingham
- Liston Stadium at Baker University in Baldwin City, Kansas
- Larry Mahaney Diamond at the University of Maine in Orono, Maine
- Leonidoff Field at Marist University in Poughkeepsie, New York
- Mackay Stadium at University of Nevada in Reno, Nevada – 2000 – replaced natural grass, 2010
- UC Baseball Stadium (baseball) at the University of Cincinnati in Cincinnati – 2004
- Martin Stadium at Washington State University in Pullman, Washington – 2000 – replaced sand-filled Omni-turf
- Mazzella Field and Rice Oval at Iona University in New Rochelle, New York – completed in Fall 2007
- McCulloch Stadium at Willamette University in Salem, Oregon
- Memorial Stadium at the University of Illinois at Urbana–Champaign in Champaign, Illinois – 2008 – replaced GameDay Grass, plus:
- Memorial Stadium at the University of Kansas in Lawrence, Kansas
- Memorial Stadium at the University of Nebraska–Lincoln in Lincoln, Nebraska (the first college-only football stadium to use FieldTurf in 1999), plus these other facilities at the school:
  - Hawks Championship Center – Nebraska Cornhuskers indoor training facility
  - Ed and Joyanne Gass Practice Fields – Nebraska Cornhuskers outdoor training facility
  - Cook Pavilion – University Campus Recreation facility
  - Vine Street Fields – University Campus Recreation intramural fields
  - Mabel Lee Fields – University Campus Recreation intramural fields
- Michie Stadium at the United States Military Academy in West Point, New York
- Michigan Stadium at the University of Michigan in Ann Arbor, Michigan (2003, 2010), plus:
  - Oosterbaan Fieldhouse, the football program's indoor practice facility (2001)
- Mooradian Field at the University of New Hampshire in Durham, New Hampshire
- Motamed Field (lacrosse, soccer) at Adelphi University in Garden City, New York – 2008
- Mountaineer Field at Milan Puskar Stadium at the West Virginia University in Morgantown, West Virginia
- Multi-Sport Field at Georgetown University in Washington, D.C.
- Municipal Stadium at Hope College in Holland, Michigan – 2012
- Navy–Marine Corps Memorial Stadium at the United States Naval Academy in Annapolis, Maryland (2005),
- Nicholson Fieldhouse at the University of Central Florida in Orlando, Florida – 2005
- Nogoesco Field (soccer) at the University of San Francisco in San Francisco
- Notre Dame Stadium at the University of Notre Dame in Notre Dame, Indiana – including indoor and outdoor practice fields
- O'Shaugnessy Stadium in St. Paul, Minnesota
- Oakland University in Rochester, Michigan (First installation in Michigan) – 1998
- Ohio Stadium at Ohio State University in Columbus, Ohio – 2007
  - Ohio State University Marching Band practice facility at The Ohio State University in Columbus, Ohio
- Oliver C. Dawson Stadium at South Carolina State University in Orangeburg, South Carolina – 2006
- Peoples Bank Field at Ottawa University in Ottawa, Kansas – 2007
- Perkins Stadium at University of Wisconsin-Whitewater in Whitewater, Wisconsin
- Plaster Sports Complex at Missouri State University in Springfield, Missouri
- Princeton Stadium at Princeton University in Princeton, New Jersey
- Providence Park at Portland State University in Portland, Oregon
- Ralph E. Davis Pioneer Stadium at University of Wisconsin–Platteville
- Ramer Field at University of Wisconsin-River Falls in River Falls, Wisconsin
- Reser Stadium at Oregon State University in Corvallis, Oregon – 2005
- Rice Stadium at Rice University in Houston, Texas
- Rice-Eccles Stadium at the University of Utah in Salt Lake City, Utah
- Robert K. Kraft Field at Lawrence A. Wien Stadium at Columbia University in New York – 2005
- Rockbowl Stadium at Loras College in Dubuque, Iowa
- Rooney Field at Duquesne University in Pittsburgh, Pennsylvania
- Roos Field at Eastern Washington University in Cheney, Washington has red turf
- Ross Memorial Park and Alexandre Stadium at Washington & Jefferson College
- Rutgers Stadium at Rutgers University in Piscataway, New Jersey
- Rynearson Stadium at Eastern Michigan University in Ypsilanti, Michigan – original installation in 2005, replaced with a new gray FieldTurf surface in 2014
- Roy Stewart Stadium at Murray State University in Murray, Kentucky 2007
- Saluki Stadium at Southern Illinois University Carbondale in Carbondale, Illinois (2010)
- Scheumann Stadium at Ball State University in Muncie, Indiana
- Schneider Stadium at Carroll University in Waukesha, Wisconsin
- Schoellkopf Field at Cornell University in Ithaca, New York – 2008
- Seth Grove Stadium at Shippensburg University in Shippensburg, Pennsylvania – 2010
- Simon Field at Doane University in Crete, Nebraska
- Skelly Field at H. A. Chapman Stadium at the University of Tulsa in Tulsa, Oklahoma – 2000, 2013
- Sonny Lubick Field at Hughes Stadium at Colorado State University in Fort Collins, Colorado – 2006 – replaced natural grass
- South Recreational Area Fields at Virginia Tech in Blacksburg, Virginia – 2015
- Stagg Field at Springfield College in Springfield, Massachusetts – 2007
- TCF Bank Stadium at the University of Minnesota in Minneapolis – 2009
- Terwilliger Brothers Field at Max Bishop Stadium (baseball) at the U.S. Naval Academy in Annapolis, Maryland – 2005
- Titan Stadium at University of Wisconsin–Oshkosh in Oshkosh, Wisconsin – 2005
- Tom Adams Field at Wayne State University in Detroit – 2006
- Tubby Raymond Field at Delaware Stadium at the University of Delaware in Newark, Delaware
- Van Andel Soccer Stadium at Hope College in Holland, Michigan – 2009
- Vendetti Field at Nichols College in Dudley, Massachusetts – 2005
- Harring Field at Veterans Memorial Stadium (La Crosse) at University of Wisconsin-La Crosse in La Crosse, Wisconsin
- Virtue Field (lacrosse, soccer) at University of Vermont in Burlington, Vermont – 2012
- Waldo Stadium at Western Michigan University in Kalamazoo, Michigan – 2006
- Walter J. Zable Stadium at The College of William and Mary in Williamsburg, Virginia – 2006
- Walkup Skydome at Northern Arizona University in Flagstaff, Arizona – 2008 – replaced AstroTurf
- Warren McGuirk Alumni Stadium at University of Massachusetts Amherst in Amherst, Massachusetts – 2006
- William J. Bonomo Memorial Field at Adelphi University in Garden City, New York – Baseball, 2007
- Williams Stadium at Liberty University in Lynchburg, Virginia
- Wish Field at DePaul University in Chicago – 2005
- Xavier University Soccer Complex in Cincinnati
- Yager Stadium at Miami University in Oxford, Ohio
- Yale Bowl at Yale University – 2019

== U.S. high schools ==
=== Alabama ===
- Cullman High School, Cullman, Alabama 2010

=== Alaska ===
- Anchorage Football Stadium, Anchorage, Alaska 1999,
- Dimond High Alumni Field, Anchorage, Alaska
- Chugiak Stadium, Chugiak, Alaska – 2008
- Mulcahy Stadium, Anchorage, Alaska 2009

=== Arizona ===
- Arcadia High School – Scottsdale, Arizona – 2010
- Chaparral High School – Scottsdale, Arizona – 2009
- Marana High School – Tucson, Arizona – 2013
- Maricopa High School – Maricopa, Arizona – 2014
- Mountain View High School – Tucson, Arizona – 2013
- Winslow High School – Winslow, Arizona – 2008

=== California ===
- Trabuco Hills High School – Mission Viejo, California – 2006
- Pittsburg High School – Pittsburg, California – 2003
- Gonsalves Stadium – Clayton Valley High School, Concord, California – 2004
- The Bishop's School, La Jolla, California
- Ted Slavin Field – Harvard-Westlake School, North Hollywood – 2003
- Los Altos High School – Los Altos
- Carl Anderson Football Field – Mountain View – 2003
- Amador Valley High School – Pleasanton – 2000
- Pat Tillman Stadium – Leland High School, San Jose, California – 2004
- La Canada High School – La Cañada Flintridge, California
- Los Altos High School – Los Altos, California
- Rancho Bernardo High School – San Diego – 2005
- Redwood High School – Larkspur – 2004
- Torrey Pines High School – San Diego – 2003
- Vista High School – Vista – 2004
- Mount Carmel High School – San Diego – 2005
- Marin Catholic High School – Kentfield – 2006
- Marin Academy – San Rafael – 1999
- Mission Viejo High School–Mission Viejo, California -2006
- Laguna Hills High School–Laguna Hills, California -2006
- La Jolla High School–La Jolla, California
- Saratoga High School–Saratoga, California -2004
- Berkeley High School–Berkeley, California -2006
- Reedley High School–Reedley, California -2006
- Madera High School – Madera, California – 2006
- Central High School – Fresno, California – 2007
- Saint Francis High School, La Canada-Flintridge, California -2004
- Loyola High School, Los Angeles – 2006
- Point Loma High School, San Diego – 2000
- Sonora High School – Sonora, California
- Oakdale High School – Oakdale, California
- Mountain View High School – Mountain View, California
- Del Mar High School San Jose, California – original installation in 2006, replaced with a new FieldTurf surface in 2017
- Ygnacio Valley High School Concord, California – 2006

=== Connecticut ===
- East Hartford High School - East Hartford, Connecticut
- Glastonbury High School – Glastonbury, Connecticut – 2007
- Guilford High School – Guilford, Connecticut – 2008
- Hamden High School – Hamden, Connecticut -2001
- King Low Heywood Thomas – Stamford, Connecticut - 2007
- Kingswood-Oxford School – West Hartford, Connecticut - 2007
- Manchester High School - Manchester, Connecticut - 2016
- Norwalk High School – Norwalk, Connecticut – 1999, Re-installed in 2010
- Norwich Free Academy – Norwich, Connecticut – 2010
- Ridgefield High School – Ridgefield, Connecticut - 2001
- St. Luke's School – New Canaan, Connecticut – 2006
- Stamford High School – Stamford, Connecticut – 2011
- Wethersfield High School – Wethersfield, Connecticut – 2004
- Wilton High School – Wilton, Connecticut – 2003
- Windham High School - Willimantic, Connecticut - 2022

=== Colorado ===
- Dutch Clark Stadium–Pueblo, Colorado -2005

=== Delaware ===
- DeGroat Field – Tower Hill School, Wilmington, Delaware

=== District of Columbia ===
- St. Johns Upper Field – (St. John's College High School), Washington, D.C.

=== Florida ===
- St. Thomas Aquinas High School, Brian Piccolo Stadium, Fort Lauderdale – 2007
- Bishop Verot High School (Fort Myers, Florida)- 2007
- Palm Bay High School (Melbourne, Florida)
- Melbourne Central Catholic High School (Melbourne, Florida) – 2006
- Jesuit High School of Tampa
- Lake Mary High School - 2014

=== Georgia ===
- McEachern High School, Powder Springs – 2005
- Callaway Stadium, LaGrange - 2004
- Grisham Stadium, Carrollton – 2008
- Hoskyn Stadium, Riverwood High School – Sandy Springs – 2007
- Staples Stadium, Heard County High School – Franklin – 2008
- Union County High School – Blairsville – 2011
- Etowah High School, Woodstock – 2009
- Lumpkin County High School, Dahlonega, Georgia – 2009
- McConnell-Talbert Stadium (Playing field of Houston County, Warner Robins, and Northside high schools) Warner Robins, Georgia – to be installed in 2015

=== Hawaii ===
- Aloha Stadium, Honolulu, Hawaii
- Clarence T.C. Ching Field, University of Hawaiʻi at Mānoa, Honolulu, Hawaii
- Hugh Yoshida Stadium, Leilehua High School, Wahiawa, Hawaii
- John Kauinana Stadium, Mililani High School, Mililani, Hawaii
- James B. Castle High School, Kaneohe, Hawaii
- Kamehameha Schools Maui Campus, Pukalani, Hawaii
- President Theodore Roosevelt High School, Honolulu, Hawaii
- Saint Louis School, Honolulu, Hawaii

=== Indiana ===
- Avon High School – Avon, Indiana
- Ben Davis High School – Indianapolis, Indiana
- Evansville Bosse High School – Evansville, Indiana – 2009
- Brebeuf Jesuit Preparatory School – Indianapolis, Indiana – 2011
- Carmel High School – Carmel, Indiana
- Cathedral High School – Indianapolis, Indiana
- Center Grove High School – Greenwood, Indiana
- Crown Point High School – Crown Point, Indiana
- Evansville Central High School – Evansville, Indiana – 2009
- Evansville Reitz High School – Evansville, Indiana – 2009
- Gibson Southern High School – Fort Branch, Indiana – 2014
- Greenwood Community High School – Greenwood, Indiana – 2012
- Hamilton Southeastern High School – Fishers, Indiana
- Hobart High School – Hobart, Indiana – 2009
- Homestead High School – Fort Wayne, Indiana
- Knightstown High School – Knightstown, Indiana – 2012
- Lafayette Jefferson High School – Lafayette, Indiana
- Lawrence Central High School – Indianapolis, Indiana
- Lawrence North High School – Indianapolis, Indiana
- Merrillville High School – Merrillville, Indiana
- North Central High School – Indianapolis, Indiana
- Pike High School – Indianapolis, Indiana – 2007
- Plainfield High School – Plainfield, Indiana
- Roncalli High School – Indianapolis, Indiana
- Southridge High School – Huntingburg, Indiana – 2010
- Warren Central High School – Indianapolis, Indiana – 2003
- Valparaiso High School - Valparaiso, Indiana - 2007
- Zionsville Community High School – Zionsville, Indiana

=== Illinois ===
- Champaign Central High School, Champaign
- Carmel Catholic High School, Mundelein
- Lake Zurich High School, Lake Zurich
- Libertyville High School, Libertyville
- Lincoln-Way Central High School, New Lenox
- Lincoln-Way East High School, Frankfort
- Marian Catholic High School, Chicago Heights
- Riverside Brookfield High School, Riverside
- St. Ignatius College Prep, Chicago
- Wheaton North High School, Wheaton
- Wheaton Warrenville South High School, Wheaton
- Evanston Township High School, Evanston, Illinois
- Niles West High School, Skokie
- Grayslake North High School, Grayslake, Illinois
- Grayslake Central High School, Grayslake, Illinois
- Nazareth Academy, La Grange Park, Illinois
- Warren Township High School, Gurnee, Illinois
- St. Rita of Cascia High School, Chicago
- Ridgewood High School (Illinois), Norridge, Illinois
- Elmwood Park High School, Elmwood Park, Illinois
- Vernon Hills High School, Vernon Hills, Illinois
- Pinckneyville Community High School, Pinckneyville, Illinois
- Du Quoin High School, Du Quoin, Illinois
- Carterville High School, Carterville, Illinois
- Johnston City High School, Johnston City, Illinois
- Montini Catholic High School, Lombard, Illinois
- Homewood-Flossmoor High School, Flossmoor, Illinois
- Providence Catholic High School, New Lenox, Illinois
- Joliet West High School, Joliet, Illinois
- Lemont High School, Lemont, Illinois

=== Iowa ===
- Johnston High School, Johnston, Iowa, used by Johnston High School athletics and occasionally Dowling Catholic High School athletics – 2005
- Urbandale High School, Urbandale, Iowa, Used by Urbandale High School Athletics – 2008
- Newton High School, Newton, Iowa, used by Newton High School

Beckman High School, Dyersville, Iowa, used by Beckman High School Athletics – 2010

- Kingston Stadium, Cedar Rapids, Iowa, Used by all three metro high school athletics – 2009
- Linn-Mar Stadium, Marion, Iowa, Used for Linn-Mar High School Athletics- Spring 2011
- Clear Creek Amana High School, Tiffin, Iowa

=== Kansas ===
- Andover District Stadium, Andover, used by Andover High School and Andover Central High School.
- Blue Valley High School, Stilwell, used by Blue Valley High school and Blue Valley West High School.
- Chanute Community Sports Complex, Chanute – 2004
- Goddard High School, Goddard – 2000
- Fischer Field, Newton – 2004, current home to KSHSAA 8-man state football championships.
- Gowans Stadium, Hutchinson – 2005, also used by Hutchinson Community College
- Hummer Sports Complex, Topeka – 2003
- Hutchinson Field, Pittsburg - 2006, used by Pittsburg High School and Colgan-St. Mary's High School
- Memorial Stadium, Dodge City – 2006, also used by Dodge City Community College
- Memorial Stadium, Garden City – 2004, also used by Garden City Community College
- Stanley Stadium, Rose Hill, Kansas – 2005, used by Rose Hill Junior Football, Rose Hill Middle School, and Rose Hill High School.
- Veterans Memorial Stadium, Coffeyville – 2003, also used by Coffeyville Community College.
- Wichita Collegiate School, Wichita – 2011
- Circle District Stadium, Towanda, Kansas, used by Circle High School and Circle Recreation athletic teams.
- All Wichita public high schools have Matrix Turf from Hellas Construction. South, Heights, and Northwest have it on their main varsity fields, while Southeast, North, East, and West have it on their junior varsity fields since they do not have a varsity stadium.

=== Kentucky ===
- Joseph K. Ford Stadium, Lexington Catholic High School, Lexington – 1999
- Edgar McNab Field Beechwood High School, Fort Mitchell – 2001
- Marshall Stadium, Trinity High School, St. Matthews – 2005
- Steele Stadium, Owensboro Catholic High School, Owensboro – 2007

=== Louisiana ===
- Cougar Stadium – St. Thomas More Catholic High School, Lafayette, Louisiana – 2006
- Yockey Bernard Field at Harvey Peltier Stadium – Edward Douglas White Catholic High School, Thibodaux, Louisiana – 2013

=== Maine ===
- Fitzpatrick Stadium- Portland High School, Portland, Maine
- Weatherbee Sports Complex- Hampden Academy, Hampden, Maine

=== Maryland ===
- Broadneck High School – Annapolis, Maryland – first high school with turf field
- Hope Field and Brumbaugh Field, St. Andrew's Episcopal School, Potomac, Maryland
- Riverdale Baptist School, Landover, Maryland

=== Massachusetts ===
- Hanson Memorial Field – Somerset Berkley Regional High School, Somerset, Massachusetts – 2013
- Oliver Ames High School, North Easton, Massachusetts – 2009
- Catholic Memorial High School, West Roxbury, Massachusetts
- Cawley Memorial Stadium, Lowell, Massachusetts
- Donovan Field at Brother Gilbert Stadium – Malden Catholic High School, Malden, Massachusetts – 2004
- Hanlon Field Medway High School, Medway, Massachusetts- 2004
- Harvard Stadium, Allston, Massachusetts
- Hittenger Field- Belmont High School, Belmont, Massachusetts -2003
- Auburn Memorial Field – Auburn High School (Massachusetts) – 2006
- Flyer Field – Framingham High School, Framingham, Massachusetts – 2006
- Manning Bowl- Lynn, Massachusetts
- Marciano Stadium Brockton High School, Brockton, Massachusetts
- Milford High School, Milford, Massachusetts
- Arthur I. Hurd Field Oakmont Regional High School, Ashburnham, Massachusetts – 2007
- Mac Aldrich Field, B.M.C. Durfee High School, Fall River, Massachusetts
- Newton South High School, Newton, Massachusetts
- Belmont Hill School, Belmont, Massachusetts
- Walpole High School, Walpole, Massachusetts
- Woburn Memorial High School, Woburn, Massachusetts
- Alexo Tiger Stadium, Taunton High School, Taunton, Massachusetts- 2008
- Arthur Roberts Stadium, Holyoke High

North Field, Medway High School Medway MA 2014 South Field, Medway High School Medway MA 2014School, Holyoke, Massachusetts 2001

- World War II Veterans Memorial Field, Canton High School, Canton, Massachusetts – 2005
- Reading Memorial High School, Reading, Massachusetts – 2007
- Parker Middle School, Reading, Massachusetts – 2009
- Worcester Academy, Worcester, Massachusetts – 2011
- Eugene V. Lovely Memorial Field – Andover, Massachusetts - 2007
- W. Leo Shields Memorial Field, Barnstable (Planned)
- Pembroke High School, Pembroke, Massachusetts

=== Michigan ===
- Canton High School, Canton – 2003
- Chelsea High School, Jerry Niehaus Field, Chelsea – 2008
- Detroit Country Day School, Shaw Stadium, Beverly Hills – 1998 (first installation of FieldTurf in the United States for a high school)
- Holland Christian High School, Holland – 2000
- Huron High School, Ann Arbor – 2004
- Jackson High School, Withington Community Stadium (shared stadium with Lumen Christi High School), Jackson – 2008
- Otsego High School, Bulldog Stadium, Otsego – 2007
- Pioneer High School, Ann Arbor – 2004
- Pontiac High School, Wisner Stadium, Pontiac, Michigan – 2006 (Donated after use for Super Bowl XL practices ceased.)
- Southfield High School, Southfield – 2003
- Southfield-Lathrup High School, Lathrup Village – 2003
- Saline High School, Saline – 2004

=== Minnesota ===
- StarsDome – Academy of Holy Angels, Richfield, Minnesota – 2004
- Lakeville North High School, Lakeville, Minnesota – 2008

=== Mississippi ===
- Olive Branch High School – Olive Branch, Mississippi – 2008
- Tupelo High School - Tupelo, Mississippi - 2016

=== Missouri ===
- Francis Field – Washington University in St. Louis, St. Louis, Missouri – 2004
- Pirate Stadium – Platte County High School, Platte City, Missouri – 2002
- Rockhurst Field – Rockhurst High School, Kansas City, Missouri – 2001
- Tiger Stadium – Excelsior Springs High School, Excelsior Springs, Missouri – 2004
- Hickman High School Columbia, Missouri – 2006
- Rock Bridge High School Columbia, Missouri – 2006
- Klemm Field – Christian Brothers College High School St. Louis, Missouri – 2003
- St. Louis University High School Field – St. Louis University High School, St. Louis, Missouri – Date Unknown

=== Nebraska ===
15 of the 16 teams in the METRO Conference, Nebraska's biggest (by school size) and most competitive conference, play on FieldTurf fields.

- Bellevue West Stadium – Bellevue West, Bellevue, Nebraska – 2005
- Benson Stadium – Omaha Benson, Omaha, Nebraska – 2008
- Buell Stadium – Millard North, Millard South, Millard West, Omaha – 2005
- Burke Stadium – Omaha Burke High School, Omaha – 2008
- Chieftain Stadium – Bellevue East, Bellevue – 2008
- Collin Stadium – Omaha South, Omaha – 2009
- Kinnick Stadium – Omaha North, Omaha Northwest, Omaha – 2009
- Papillion-La Vista Stadium – Papillion La Vista South High School, Papillion, Nebraska – 2003
- Pioneer Field – Nebraska City High School, Lourdes Central Catholic, Nebraska City, Nebraska – 2008
- Seacrest Field – Lincoln Public Schools, Lincoln, Nebraska – 2000
- Seaman Stadium – Omaha Central High School, Omaha – 2005
- Westside High School – Omaha – 2004

=== Nevada ===
- Damonte Ranch High School Football Field – Damonte Ranch High School – Washoe County School District, Reno, Nevada – 2006
- Golden Eagle Regional Park – City of Sparks, Washoe County, Nevada – 2008

=== New Hampshire ===
- Hanover High School – Hanover, New Hampshire – Summer 2006, Multi-use field for Football, boys and girls Soccer and Lacrosse
- Bedford High School – Bedford, New Hampshire – 2006, Multi-use field for football, boys and girls Soccer, Lacrosse, and Field Hockey.

=== New Jersey ===
- Arthur L. Johnson High School – Clark, New Jersey – Summer 2008
- Bergen Catholic – Oradell, New Jersey – Summer 1998 (third installation of FieldTurf in the United States for a high school)
- Central Regional High School – Bayville, New Jersey – Fall 2014
- Colonia High School – Colonia, New Jersey – Summer 2014
- Don Bosco Prep – Ramsey, New Jersey – Spring 2004
- Dwight-Englewood School – Englewood, New Jersey – May 2006
- Dwight Morrow High School – Englewood, New Jersey – Fall 2008
- Egg Harbor Township High School – Egg Harbor Township, New Jersey – November 2009
- Governor Livingston High School – Berkeley Heights, New Jersey – September 2006
- Hasbrouck Heights High School – Hasbrouck Heights, New Jersey – 2007
- Holmdel High School – Holmdel, New Jersey – July 2006
- Hun School of Princeton – Princeton, New Jersey – Summer 2004
- Hunterdon Central High School – Flemington, New Jersey – Summer 2005
- Mahwah High School – Mahwah, New Jersey – September 2006
- Monmouth University – West Long Branch, New Jersey – Summer 2006
- Northern Highlands Regional High School – Allendale, New Jersey – Spring 2008
- Pascack Valley High School – Hillsdale, New Jersey – August 2005
- Princeton Day School – Princeton, New Jersey – Summer 2003
- Riverfront Park – Newark, New Jersey – June 2012
- North Hunterdon High School – Clinton, New Jersey – Spring 2006
- Saint Joseph Regional High School – Montvale, New Jersey
- Saint Peter's Preparatory High School – Jersey City, New Jersey
- St. Augustine College Preparatory School – Richland, New Jersey – Summer/Fall 2005
- Ramapo High School – Franklin Lakes, New Jersey
- Raritan High School – Hazlet, New Jersey – June 2006
- Rutgers Preparatory School – Somerset, New Jersey
- Rutgers Stadium – Piscataway, New Jersey
- West Morris Mendham High School – Mendham, New Jersey – Summer 2008
- West Windsor-Plainsboro High School North – Plainsboro, New Jersey – 2007
- West Windsor-Plainsboro High School South – West Windsor, New Jersey – 2007
- Gill St. Bernard's School – Gladstone, New Jersey – 2014

=== New York ===
Freeport High School – 2012

- Victor Central School District – Victor, New York – 2007
- Arlington High School – LaGrange, New York – 2007
- Byram Hills High School – Armonk, New York – 2004
- Colgate University – Hamilton, New York – 2007
- Division Avenue High School – Levittown, New York – 2008
- East Rochester High School – East Rochester, New York – 2001
- Fairport High School (Joe Cummings Field) – Fairport, New York – 2008
- Garden City High School – Garden City, New York – 2005
- Gowanda High School (Baseball and Softball Fields)- Gowanda, New York - 2020
- Huntington High School – Huntington, New York – 2007
- Irondequoit High School – Irondequoit, New York – 2005
- John Nugent Stadium – Rye, New York – 2004
- Ed Walsh Field – Manhasset, New York – 2004
- Butler Field – Scarsdale, New York – 2005
- Walter Panas High School – Cortlandt Manor, New York – 2005
- Monsignor Farrell High School - Staten Island, New York - 2005
- St. Joseph by the Sea High School – Staten Island, New York – 2003
- St. Peter's Boys High School – Staten Island, New York – 2006
- Chaminade High School – Mineola, New York – September 2003
- Brooklyn Technical High School – Fort Greene, Brooklyn -
- George W. Hewlett High School – Hewlett, New York – 2003
- Commack High School – Commack, New York – 2006
- Manhasset High School – Manhasset, New York – 2003
- Poly Prep Country Day School – Brooklyn, New York – 2007 THIS IS NOT A FIELD TURF INSTALLATION. IT WAS MONDOTURF in 2007 installed by Dartz & Matz inc
- Paul D. Schreiber High School – Port Washington, New York – 2006
- Thomas A. Edison High School – Elmira Heights, New York – 2003
- Walt Whitman High School – South Huntington, New York – 2008
- Wantagh High School – Wantagh, New York – 2008
- Yorkshire-Pioneer High School – Yorkshire, New York – 2008
- Amsterdam High School – Amsterdam, New York – 2004
- La Salle Institute – Troy, New York – 2018

=== North Carolina ===
- Ardrey Kell High School – Charlotte, North Carolina - 2006
- Mallard Creek High School - Charlotte, North Carolina - 2007
- Rocky River High School - Mint Hill, North Carolina -

=== Ohio ===
- Alumni Stadium – Jackson HS – Jackson, Ohio – 2003
- Alumni Stadium – Perry HS – Perry, Ohio – 2006
- Alumni Stadium – St. Francis DeSales HS – Columbus, Ohio – 2005
- Anderson Field – Grandview Heights HS – Columbus, Ohio – 2007
- Arrowhead Stadium – Girard HS – Girard, Ohio – 2008
- Avon Stadium – Avon HS – Avon, Ohio – 2007
- Bearcat Stadium – Bedford/Benedictine/Glenville/Trinity – Bedford, Ohio – 2004
- Blue Streak Stadium – Lake HS – Uniontown, Ohio – 2008
- Brunswick Auto Mart Stadium – Brunswick HS – Brunswick, Ohio – 2004
- Cardinal Stadium – Canfield HS – Canfield, Ohio – 2006
- Cardinal Stadium – Colerain HS – Cincinnati – 2003, 2013
- Centerville Stadium – Centerville HS Centerville, Ohio – 2006
- Coffman Stadium – Dublin Coffman HS – Dublin, Ohio
- Coughlin Field – St. Edward HS – Lakewood, Ohio – 2004
- Collinwood Stadium – Collinwood HS – Cleveland, Ohio – 2008
- Community Stadium – Kenston HS – Chagrin Falls, Ohio – 2010
- Copley Stadium – Copley-Fairlawn HS – Copley, Ohio – 2008
- CS Harris Stadium – Chagrin Falls HS – Chagrin Falls, Ohio – 2005
- Denison Park – Cleveland Heights HS – Cleveland Heights, Ohio – 2011
- Don Paul Stadium – Fremont Ross /St Joseph Central Catholic, Fremont, Ohio – 2005
- Donnell stadium – Findlay High School - Findlay, Ohio – 2007
- Dowed Field – Archbishop Hoban HS – Akron, Ohio – 2004
- Dr James B Daley Stadium – Fairview HS – Fairview Park, Ohio – 2010
- Falcon Pride Stadium – Jefferson Area HS – Jefferson, Ohio – 2011
- Falcon Stadium – Austintown-Fitch HS – Youngstown, Ohio – 2007
- Firestone Stadium – Ohio High School Athletic Association state softball tournament – Akron, Ohio – 2022
- First National Bank Field - Bellevue HS - Bellevue, Ohio - 2013
- Gallagher Stadium – Central Catholic High School – Toledo, Ohio – 2008
- George Finnie Stadium, Tressel Field – Berea/Midpark – Berea, Ohio – 2008
- Gilmour Stadium – Gilmour Academy – Gates Mills, Ohio – 2004
- Green Street Stadium, John Cistone Field – St Vincent-St Mary – Akron, Ohio 2005
- Indian Stadium – Valley HS – Lucasville, Ohio – 2000 (reinstalled 2014)
- Jack Johnson Field – Harvest Preparatory School – Columbus, Ohio – 2008
- Jerome Stadium – Dublin Jerome HS – Dublin, Ohio – 2004
- Jerome T. Osbourne Sr. Stadium – Mentor HS/Mentor Lake Catholic – Mentor, Ohio – 2006
- Jim Van de Grift Stadium – Lebanon HS Lebanon, Ohio – 2008
- Joseph B Yost Stadium - Ellet HS Akron, Ohio -2019
- Ken Dukes Stadium – Medina HS – Medina, Ohio – 2006
- Korb Field – Brush HS – Lyndhurst, Ohio – 2002
- Lakeside Stadium – Lakeside HS – Ashtabula, Ohio – 2006
- Lakewood Stadium – Lakewood/St Edward – Lakewood, Ohio – 2007
- Leopard Stadium – Louisville HS – Louisville, Ohio – 2010
- Linder Field – Cincinnati Hills Christian Academy – Cincinnati – 2010
- Massillon Paul Brown Tiger Stadium – Washington HS – Massillon, Ohio – 2007
- Memorial Stadium – Avon Lake HS – Avon Lake, Ohio – 2010
- Memorial Stadium, Don Hertler Sr. Field – Hoover HS – North Canton, Ohio – 2011
- Memorial Stadium, InfoCision Field – Green HS – Green, Ohio – 2008
- Moorehead Memorial Stadium – Upper Arlington HS – Columbus, Ohio – 2003
- Mullenkopf Stadium – Warren G Harding HS/John F Kennedy HS – Warren, Ohio – 2005
- Patterson Field – Dawson-Bryant HS – Coal Grove, Ohio – 2007
- Pointer Stadium – South Point HS – South Point, Ohio – 2007
- Purple Rider Stadium – Martins Ferry HS, Martins Ferry, Ohio – 2007
- Ralph P Adams Stadium – Cuyahoga Heights HS – Cuyahoga Heights, Ohio – 2008
- Ravenna Stadium, Gilcrest Field – Ravenna HS – Ravenna, Ohio – 2003
- Robert Boulton Stadium, Byers Field – Normandy/Parma/St Ignatius/Valley Forge – Parma, Ohio – 2008
- Rocky River Stadium – Rocky River HS – Rocky River, Ohio – 2004
- Roush Stadium – Fairmont HS – Kettering, Ohio – 2005
- Scioto Stadium – Dublin Scioto HS – Dublin, Ohio
- Serpentini Chevrolet Stadium, Gibson Field – North Royalton HS – North Royalton, Ohio – 2011
- Sirpilla Stadium – St. Thomas Aquinas HS – Louisville, Ohio – 2005
- Stewart Field – Solon HS – Solon, Ohio – 2004
- Tanks Memorial Stadium – Ironton City HS – Ironton, Ohio 2014
- Tiger Stadium – Twinsburg HS – Twinsburg, Ohio – 2005
- Veterans Stadium – Aurora HS – Aurora, Ohio – 2008
- White Field – Newark HS – Newark, Ohio – 2015
- William Boliantz Stadium – Nordonia HS – Macedonia, Ohio – 2010

=== Oklahoma ===
- Jenks High School – Jenks, Oklahoma – 2000, 2008
- Muskogee High School – Muskogee, Oklahoma – 2011
- Sapulpa High School – Sapulpa, Oklahoma – 2005
- Union HS – Tulsa, Oklahoma

=== Oregon ===
- Aloha High School – Aloha, Oregon – 2004
- Beaverton High School – Beaverton, Oregon – 2002
- Panther Stadium – Central High School – Independence, Oregon – 2010
- Cottage Grove High School – Cottage Grove, Oregon – 2003
- Mike Walsh Field – Portland, Oregon – 2002
- Pete Susick Stadium – Marshfield High School, Coos Bay, Oregon – 2000
- McMinnville High School – McMinnville, Oregon – 2008
- North Bend High School – North Bend, Oregon – 2007
- North Medford High School – Medford, Oregon – 2010
- Sherwood High School – Sherwood, Oregon – 2004
- South Medford High School – Medford, Oregon – 2010
- South Salem High School – Salem, Oregon – 2008
- Spiegelberg Stadium – Medford, Oregon – 2004
- Sprague High School – Salem, Oregon – 2007
- Stapleton Field – Gresham, Oregon – 2002
- Sunset High School – Beaverton, Oregon – 2006
- Tigard High School – Tigard, Oregon – 2008
- West Salem High School – Salem, Oregon – 2004; replaced by a black FieldTurf surface in 2012
- Westview High School – Portland, Oregon – 2006
- Willamette High School – Eugene, Oregon – 2008

=== Pennsylvania ===
- The Haverford School – Haverford, Pennsylvania – 2009
- School District of Philadelphia "SuperSites" at Northeast High School, Germantown, Dobbins and South Philadelphia
- Churchman Stadium – East Allegheny High School – North Versailles, Pennsylvania – 2000
- J. Birney Crum Stadium – Allentown School District – Allentown, Pennsylvania – ?
- Bethlehem Area School District Stadium – Bethlehem Area School District – Bethlehem, Pennsylvania – 2005
- James M. Burk Memorial Stadium – Fox Chapel Area High School – O'Hara Township, Pennsylvania – 2007
- John H. Frederick Field at Memorial Park Stadium – Mechanicsburg Area School District – Mechanicsburg, Pennsylvania – 2008
- Linden Field – General McLane High School – Edinboro, Pennsylvania – 2007
- Panthers Stadium – Central York High School – York, Pennsylvania – 2005
- Paul J. Weitz Stadium – Harbor Creek High School – Harborcreek, Pennsylvania – 2004
- Severance Field- Harrisburg High School- Harrisburg, Pennsylvania – 2004
- Snyder-Stone Stadium – Greenville Junior/Senior High School – Greenville, Pennsylvania – 2015
- Somerset Area Golden Eagle Stadium – Somerset Area High School – Somerset, Pennsylvania – 2007
- Tiger Stadium – Hollidaysburg Area High School – Hollidaysburg, Pennsylvania – 2004
- Titan Stadium – West Mifflin Area High School - West Mifflin, Pennsylvania – 2008
- Trojan Stadium – Greater Johnstown High School – Johnstown, Pennsylvania – 2003
- Turtle Creek Stadium/The Wolvarena – Woodland Hills High School – Pittsburgh– 2006
- War Memorial Field – Warren Area High School – Warren, Pennsylvania – 1998

=== Rhode Island ===
- Moses Brown School – Campanella Field – Providence, Rhode Island – 2007
- Bishop Hendricken High School – Warwick, Rhode Island – 2006
- North Smithfield High School – North Smithfield, Rhode Island – 2008

=== South Carolina ===
- Myrtle Beach High School – Doug Shaw Memorial Stadium – Myrtle Beach, South Carolina – 2008
- Rock Hill High School and Northwestern High School – District 3 Stadium – Rock Hill, South Carolina – 2008
- Spartanburg High School – Spartanburg High School Athletic Field – Spartanburg, South Carolina – 2009

=== South Dakota ===
- Central High School – Aberdeen, South Dakota – 2004
- Garitson High School – Garitson, South Dakota – 2005

=== Tennessee ===
- Montgomery Bell Academy – Tommy Owen Stadium – Nashville, Tennessee – 2006
- Oakland High School – Patriot Stadium – Murfreesboro, Tennessee – 2007
- Memphis University School – Hull Dobbs Field – Memphis, Tennessee – 2007
- Christian Brothers High School – Memphis, Tennessee – 2007
- Melrose High School – Melrose Stadium – Memphis, Tennessee – 2009
- McCallie School – Spears Stadium – Chattanooga, Tennessee – 2009
- Memphis Central High School – Crump Stadium – Memphis, Tennessee – 2012
- Evangelical Christian School – Cordova, Tennessee – 2012
- Harding Academy – Memphis, Tennessee – 2015
- Hutchison School – Memphis, Tennessee
- Grace Christian Academy – Knoxville, Tennessee
- Christian Academy of Knoxville – Knoxville, Tennessee
- Webb School of Knoxville – Knoxville, Tennessee
- Knoxville Catholic High School – Knoxville, Tennessee
- Maryville High School – Maryville, Tennessee
- Alcoa High School – Alcoa, Tennessee
- Sevier County High School – Sevierville, Tennessee
- Dobyns-Bennett High School – Kingsport, Tennessee
- Science Hill High School – Johnson City, Tennessee
- Tennessee High School – Bristol, Tennessee
- Rhea County High School – Evensville, Tennessee
- Greeneville High School – Greeneville, Tennessee
- Brentwood High School – Brentwood, Tennessee
- Nolensville High School – Nolensville, Tennessee
- Franklin High School – Franklin, Tennessee
- Sullivan East High School - Bluff City, Tennessee

=== Texas ===
- Amarillo Independent School District – Dick Bivins Stadium – Amarillo – 1998
- Carroll Independent School District – Dragon Stadium – Southlake – 1999
- Central Catholic High School – Bob Benson '66 Stadium – San Antonio – 2010
- College Station Independent School District – Tiger Field – College Station – 2008
- Corsicana Independent School District – Corsicana Tiger Stadium – Corsicana – 2006
- Cypress-Fairbanks Independent School District – The Berry Center – Houston – 2006
- Ector County Independent School District – Ratliff Stadium – Odessa – 2003
- Hays Consolidated Independent School District – Bob Shelton Stadium – Buda – 2002
- Round Rock Independent School District – RRISD Athletic Complex (The Parmer Palace) – Austin – 2003
- Leander Independent School District – Leander
  - A.C. Bible Memorial Stadium – 2009
  - Rouse High School practice field – 2008
  - Cedar Park High School practice field – Cedar Park – 2007
  - Vista Ridge High School practice field – Cedar Park, – 2007
- Navasota Independent School District – Rattler Stadium – Navasota – 2007
- Spring Branch Independent School District – Darrel Tully Stadium – Houston – 2008
- Snyder Independent School District – Tiger Stadium – Snyder
- Strake Jesuit College Preparatory – Crusader Stadium – Houston
- Wichita Falls Independent School District – Memorial Stadium – Wichita Falls

=== Virginia ===
- Bishop Ireton High School – Alexandria, Virginia - 2006
- Bishop O'Connell High School – Arlington, Virginia – 2012
- Broad Run High School – Ashburn, Virginia – 2015
- Briar Woods High School - Ashburn, Virginia - 2019
- Episcopal High School – Hummel Bowl – Alexandria, Virginia – 2006
- Fairfax High School – Harold Stalnaker Stadium – Fairfax, Virginia – 2005, 2015
- George Mason High School – Falls Church, Virginia – 2006
- Herndon High School – J.L. Griffiths Stadium – Herndon, Virginia – 2010
- Highland School – Warrenton, Virginia – 2009
- James Madison High School – Normand F. bradford, Jr. Stadium – Vienna, Virginia – 2007, 2017
- Loudoun County High School – Leesburg, Virginia – 2014
- Patrick Henry High School – Roanoke, Virginia – 2008, 2016
- Salem High School – Salem, Virginia – 2006, 2016
- West Springfield High School – Ronald J. Mobayed Memorial Stadium – Springfield, Virginia – 2006
- William Fleming High School – Roanoke, Virginia – 2010, 2019
- Yorktown High School – Arlington, Virginia – 2016
- Christiansburg High School – Christiansburg, Virginia - 2017
- Blacksburg High School – Blacksburg, Virginia - 2020
- Glenvar High School – Salem, Virginia - 2019
- William Byrd High School – Vinton, Virginia - 2016

=== Washington ===
- Bellevue School District
  - Newport High School – Bellevue, Washington – 2001
  - Bellevue High School – Bellevue, Washington – 2003
  - Sammamish High School – Bellevue, Washington – 2003
- Clover Park School District
  - Clover Park High School – Lakewood, Washington – 2000
- Edmonds School District
  - Edmonds School District Stadium – Edmonds, Washington – 2005
  - Lynnwood High School – Lynnwood, Washington – 2001
  - Meadowdale High School – Lynnwood, Washington – 2006
- Kennewick School District
  - Neil F. Lampson Stadium – Kennewick, Washington – 2006
  - Southridge High School soccer field – Kennewick, Washington – 2008
- Wilson Youth Sports Complex – Kent, Washington – 2004
- Lake Washington School District
  - Eastlake High School – Sammamish, Washington – 2004
  - Juanita High School (Bergh Field) – Kirkland, Washington – 2002
  - Lake Washington High School – Kirkland, Washington – 2002
- Mukilteo School District
  - Mariner High School (Goddard Stadium) – Everett, Washington – 2007
- Mercer Island School District
  - Mercer Island High School – Mercer Island, Washington – 2002
- Northshore School District
  - Inglemoor High School – Kenmore, Washington – 2005
- Olympia School District
  - Olympia High School (Ingersoll Stadium) – Olympia, Washington – 2004
- Pasco School District
  - Edgar Brown Memorial Stadium – Pasco, Washington – 2003
  - Chiawana High School – Pasco, Washington – 2009
- Shoreline School District
  - Shoreline Stadium – Shoreline, Washington – 2006
- Tumwater School District
  - Tumwater High School (Tumwater Stadium) – Tumwater, Washington – 2004
- University Place School District
  - Curtis High School (Viking Stadium) – University Place, Washington – 2000
- Washougal School District
  - Washougal High School (Fishback Stadium) – Washougal, Washington

=== Wisconsin ===
  - Altoona High School - Altoona, Wisconsin
  - Amherst High School - Amherst, Wisconsin
  - Appleton East High School - Appleton, Wisconsin
  - Appleton North High School - Appleton, Wisconsin
  - Appleton West High School - Appleton, Wisconsin
  - Arcadia High School - Arcadia, Wisconsin
  - Arrowhead High School - Hartland, Wisconsin
  - Ashwaubenon High School - Ashwaubenon, Wisconsin
  - Bay Port High School - Suamico, Wisconsin
  - Big Foot High School - Walworth, Wisconsin
  - Brookfield Central High School - Brookfield, Wisconsin
  - Cameron High School - Cameron, Wisconsin
  - Chippewa Falls High School - Chippewa Falls, Wisconsin
  - Cumberland High School - Cumberland, Wisconsin
  - De Pere High School - De Pere, Wisconsin
  - D.C. Everest High School - Schofield, Wisconsin
  - Eau Claire Memorial High School - Eau Claire, Wisconsin
  - Eau Claire North High School - Eau Claire, Wisconsin
  - Elkhorn High School - Elkhorn, Wisconsin
  - Fall River High School - Fall River, Wisconsin
  - Franklin High School - Franklin, Wisconsin
  - Gale-Ettrick-Trempealau High School - Galesville, Wisconsin
  - Green Bay East High School - Green Bay, Wisconsin
  - Green Bay Southwest High School - Green Bay, Wisconsin
  - Greendale High School - Greendale, Wisconsin
  - Homestead High School - Mequon, Wisconsin
  - Hortonville High School - Hortonville, Wisconsin
  - Hudson High School - Hudson, Wisconsin
  - Kaukauna High School - Kaukauna, Wisconsin
  - Kenosha Bradford High School - Kenosha, Wisconsin
  - Kenosha Indian Trail High School - Kenosha, Wisconsin
  - Kenosha Tremper High School - Kenosha, Wisconsin
  - Kettle Moraine High School - Wales, Wisconsin
  - Kewaskum High School - Kewaskum, Wisconsin
  - Kiel High School - Kiel, Wisconsin
  - Kimberly High School - Kimberly, Wisconsin
  - Kohler High School - Kohler, Wisconsin
  - La Crosse Logan High School - La Crosse, Wisconsin
  - Lakeland Union High School - Minocqua, Wisconsin
  - Lake Mills High School - Lake Mills, Wisconsin
  - Lomira High School - Lomira, Wisconsin
  - Madison East High School - Madison, Wisconsin
  - Madison Edgewood High School - Madison, Wisconsin
  - Manitowoc Lincoln High School - Manitowoc, Wisconsin
  - Marquette High School - Milwaukee, Wisconsin
  - Marshfield High School - Marshfield, Wisconsin
  - McFarland High School - McFarland, Wisconsin
  - Medford High School - Medford, Wisconsin
  - Menasha High School - Menasha, Wisconsin
  - Menomonee Falls High School - Menomonee Falls, Wisconsin
  - Menomonie High School - Menomonie, Wisconsin
  - Middleton High School - Middleton, Wisconsin
  - Milwaukee Obama SCTE High School - Milwaukee, Wisconsin
  - Milwaukee Pulaski High School - Milwaukee, Wisconsin
  - Milwaukee South High School - Milwaukee, Wisconsin
  - Milwaukee Vincent High School - Milwaukee, Wisconsin
  - Mukwonago High School - Mukwonago, Wisconsin
  - Muskego High School - Muskego, Wisconsin
  - Northwestern High School - Maple, Wisconsin
  - Notre Dame Academy - Green Bay, Wisconsin
  - Oak Creek High School - Oak Creek, Wisconsin
  - Oconomowoc High School - Oconomowoc, Wisconsin
  - Osceola High School - Osceola, Wisconsin
  - Oshkosh North High School - Oshkosh, Wisconsin
  - Oshkosh West High School - Oshkosh, Wisconsin
  - Pacelli High School - Stevens Point, Wisconsin
  - Pewaukee High School - Pewaukee, Wisconsin
  - Platteville High School - Platteville, Wisconsin
  - Pius XI High School - Milwaukee, Wisconsin
  - Port Washington High School - Port Washington, Wisconsin
  - Pulaski High School - Pulaski, Wisconsin
  - Regis High School - Eau Claire, Wisconsin
  - Rhinelander High School - Rhinelander, Wisconsin
  - Rice Lake High School - Rice Lake, Wisconsin
  - Ripon High School - Ripon, Wisconsin
  - River Falls High School - River Falls, Wisconsin
  - Shorewood High School - Shorewood, Wisconsin
  - Slinger High School - Slinger, Wisconsin
  - Stanley-Boyd High School - Stanley, Wisconsin
  - Stevens Point Area Senior High - Stevens Point, Wisconsin
  - Superior High School - Superior, Wisconsin
  - Union Grove High School - Union Grove, Wisconsin
  - University School of Milwaukee - Milwaukee, Wisconsin
  - Waukesha North High School - Waukesha, Wisconsin
  - Waukesha South High School - Waukesha, Wisconsin
  - Waukesha West High School - Waukesha, Wisconsin
  - Waunakee High School - Waunakee, Wisconsin
  - Waupaca High School - Waupaca, Wisconsin
  - Wauwatosa School District - Wauwatosa, Wisconsin
  - West Allis – West Milwaukee School District - West Allis, Wisconsin
  - West Bend School District - West Bend, Wisconsin
  - West De Pere High School - De Pere, Wisconsin
  - Westosha Central High School - Salem, Wisconsin
  - Whitefish Bay High School - Whitefish Bay, Wisconsin
  - Whitnall High School - Greenfield, Wisconsin
  - Wilmot Union High School - Wilmot, Wisconsin

== Canadian high schools ==
=== British Columbia ===
- Dr. Charles Best Secondary School – Coquitlam
- Southridge School – Surrey

=== Saskatchewan ===
- Centennial Collegiate – Saskatoon

=== Ontario ===
- St. Marcellinus High School – Mississauga
