= Sugar Grove Township, Pennsylvania =

Sugar Grove Township is the name of some places in the U.S. state of Pennsylvania:

- Sugar Grove Township, Mercer County, Pennsylvania
- Sugar Grove Township, Warren County, Pennsylvania
