= Golden Eagle Regional Park =

Sports complex in Sparks, Nevada

- Stadium size football/soccer field and the surrounding area at Golden Eagle Regional Park, March 2013.
- Interactive map of Golden Eagle Regional Park
- Location: 6400 Vista Boulevard; Sparks, Nevada 89436, U.S.A.
- Coordinates: 39°36′7″N 119°40′15″W
- Owner: City of Sparks, Nevada
- Operator: City of Sparks, Nevada
- Surface: FieldTurf
- Acreage: 140

Construction
- Built: 2008
- Opened: April 14, 2008
- Expanded: 2013
- Cost: $30 million

Golden Eagle Regional Park (or Golden Eagle Regional Park & Sports Complex) is a large outdoor artificial turf sports complex in Sparks, Nevada. At 1.4 million square feet of turf, it currently lays claim to being the largest single installation artificial turf project in North America.

== History ==
Sparks' largest public works project ever, Golden Eagle Regional Park opened near the city's Wingfield Springs area on April 14, 2008. After a 14-year process with help from the Bureau of Land Management, Golden Eagle replaced the softball fields of the former Don Mello Sports Complex. It cost around $30 million to construct and is spread out over 140 acres of a partially undeveloped 450-acre lot.

The park is partially funded through open space bond funds that were approved by voters in 2000. The remainder of the funding for Golden Eagle Regional Park comes from impact fees paid by its developers. Sparks city officials have discussed plans to further develop the lot as money becomes available, including a possible equestrian park.

In 2008, Sparks city officials explored the possibility of securing a naming rights sponsor for the park, but the park has retained its original name. Since the park opened in 2008, FieldTurf, the company that originally installed the turf, has replenished parts of the playing field with new turf.

In 2009, a Sparks city official estimated to the Nevada Assembly that the park attracts a million visitors annually, particularly for softball tournaments.

On November 7, 2011, NV Energy and the city of Sparks celebrated the completion of the park's solar energy system which generates power for the stadium's lights.

In May 2013, it was announced that phase two of the Little League area of the park was completed, including accessibility for youths with disabilities.

== Features ==
Golden Eagle Regional Park features six softball fields, two full-size baseball fields, four little league baseball fields, a stadium-size multi-use (football/soccer) field and two additional multi-purpose fields. Also located in the park are bocce ball courts, an artificial turf wiffle ball court, a beach volleyball area with four volleyball courts, and a climbing wall.

The park is equipped with stadium-sized bleachers and energy-efficient lighting. There are also a pro shop, a restaurant and a 7200-square foot concession venue on site.

== See also ==
- List of FieldTurf installations
