= Willie Blade =

German gridiron football player (born 1979)

No. 99, 96
- Position: Defensive tackle

Personal information
- Born: February 7, 1979 (age 47); Landstuhl, West Germany
- Listed height: 6 ft 3 in (1.91 m)
- Listed weight: 315 lb (143 kg)

Career information
- High school: Warner Robins (Warner Robins, Georgia, U.S.)
- College: Mississippi State
- NFL draft: 2001: 3rd round, 93rd overall pick

Career history
- Dallas Cowboys (2001); Houston Texans (2002); Dallas Cowboys (2003); New York Giants (2004)*; Jacksonville Jaguars (2004); Dallas Cowboys (2005)
- * Offseason or practice squad member only

Awards and highlights
- All-Jayhawk Conference (1998); Second-team All-SEC (2000)

Career NFL statistics
- Games played: 20
- Tackles: 18
- Sacks: 1
- Stats at Pro Football Reference

Willie Ervin Blade II (born February 7, 1979) is a former American football defensive tackle in the National Football League (NFL) for the Dallas Cowboys, Houston Texans, and Jacksonville Jaguars. He played college football at Mississippi State University.

== Early life ==
Willie Blade first attended Northside High School located on the north side of Warner Robins, Georgia. This is where he became close friends with Willie Ridley. It was after meeting Willie Ridley Sr that Blade became interested in playing football for the first time.

Due to his size, speed, natural athleticism and quick understanding of the game, that Blade became a starter at defensive tackle as a sophomore. Under the guidance of defensive line coach Tim Scott and head coach Conrad Nix, Blade became a standout in Georgia football.

For his senior year in high school Blade transferred to Warner Robins High School, where he was named to the Peach State Top 40 by the Augusta Chronicle.

He went on to play at Northwest College but transferred the next year to Butler Community College, where he earned All-Jayhawk Conference honors, after registering 42 tackles (12 for loss) and 6 sacks, helping his team win the National Junior College Championship.

As a junior, he transferred to Mississippi State University where he was a reserve defensive tackle, recording 28 tackles (4 for loss), 6 quarterback pressures, and one sack. In his senior season, he was named a starter (9 out of 11 games) and posted 51 tackles, 9 tackles for loss (third on the team), 13 quarterback pressures (second on the team) and team-highs with 4 sacks and 2 fumble recoveries. He received second-team All-SEC honors and was also a semifinalist for the Outland Trophy.

== Professional career ==
=== Dallas Cowboys (first stint) ===
Blade was selected by the Dallas Cowboys in the third round (93rd overall) of the 2001 NFL draft, after dropping because he was seen as a talented, but underachieving player. The team had finished last in the NFL in run defense the previous year and took a chance on him.

After missing the first three practices of training camp in a contract dispute, he dislocated his right wrist and sustained ligament damage during his second full practice. The injury forced the team to place him on the injured reserve list. The next season, he came into training camp out of shape and was still hampered by his right wrist injury, so the team decided to release him on September 1, 2002.

=== Houston Texans ===
On September 2, 2002, the Houston Texans claimed him off waivers, but was inactive for fifteen weeks until his release on December 24.

=== Dallas Cowboys (second stint) ===
2003 was Bill Parcells' first season as the head coach of the Dallas Cowboys, the team was looking to improve its defensive line depth and signed him on January 7. Parcells liked his potential, and went as far as involving Blade's parents, being present in every one of his weight checks and personally monitoring his workouts, while trying to change his attitude.

Blade recovered from a preseason MCL sprained and would go on to play a key role in the NFL first ranked defensive unit, starting 14 games at left defensive tackle opposite La'Roi Glover, while registering 18 tackles (3 for loss), one sack and 8 quarterback pressures. The Cowboys expected him to keep improving, but the next season he relapsed into his old habits, reporting to training camp overweight and was released on July 26, 2004.

=== New York Giants ===
On July 28, 2004, the New York Giants claimed him off waivers, but released him just two days later, after he could not complete the team's conditioning run.

=== Jacksonville Jaguars ===
On August 2, 2004, Blade was claimed by the Jacksonville Jaguars to compete for the third tackle position, but was eventually released on November 9.

=== Dallas Cowboys (third stint) ===
On January 21, 2005, he was signed by the Dallas Cowboys, but suffered a ruptured Achilles tendon in the NFL Europe training camp. He was released on September 4.

=== Tampa Bay Storm ===
In 2007, he played with the Tampa Bay Storm of the Arena Football League.
