= Greenville Area School District =

School district in Pennsylvania

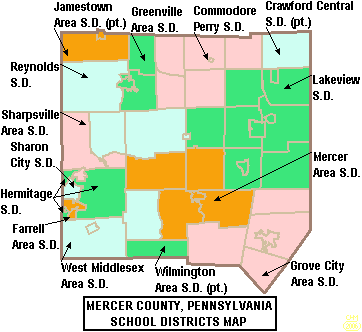

Address
- 9 Donation Road Greenville, Mercer County, Pennsylvania, 16125-1789; United States

District information
- Type: Public

Other information
- Website: www.greenville.k12.pa.us

The Greenville Area School District is a small, rural, public school district serving parts of Mercer County, Pennsylvania. It is centered in the borough of Greenville and also covers Sugar Grove Township and Hempfield Townships. Greenville Area School District encompasses approximately 29 square miles (75 km^{2}).

According to 2000 federal census data, it serves a resident population of 13,500. By 2010, the Greenville Area School District's population declined to 10,627 people. In 2009, the district residents' per capita income was $16,944, while the median family income was $42,421. The school district was formed in 1810.

Greenville Area School District operates two schools: Greenville Elementary School (K-6) and Greenville Junior/Senior High School (7-12).

== Extracurriculars ==
Greenville Area School District offers a variety of clubs, activities and an extensive sports program. The Greenville High School Band has won local and regional competitions. The district offers several sports in cooperation with neighboring Commodore Perry School District, including Soccer for boys and girls and baseball.

=== Sports ===
The District funds:

Boys

- Basketball- AA
- Cross Country - A
- Football - AA
- Golf - AA
- Tennis - AA
- Track and Field - AA
- Wrestling - AA

Girls

- Basketball - AA
- Cross Country - AA
- Girls' Tennis - A
- Track and Field - AA
- Volleyball - AA

Junior High School Sports

Boys

- Basketball
- Cross Country
- Football
- Track and Field
- Wrestling

Girls

- Basketball
- Cross Country
- Track and Field
- Volleyball

According to PIAA directory July 2013
