= Greg Tremble =

American football player (born 1972)

No. 27, 25
- Position: Safety

Personal information
- Born: April 16, 1972 (age 54); Warner Robins, Georgia, U.S.
- Listed height: 5 ft 11 in (1.80 m)
- Listed weight: 188 lb (85 kg)

Career information
- High school: Warner Robins
- College: Georgia
- NFL draft: 1994: undrafted

Career history
- Cleveland Browns (1994); Dallas Cowboys (1995); Philadelphia Eagles (1995)

Awards and highlights
- First-team All-SEC (1992)

Career NFL statistics
- Games played: 11
- Stats at Pro Football Reference

Gregory Deshawn Tremble (born April 16, 1972) is an American former professional football player who was a safety in the National Football League (NFL) for the Dallas Cowboys and Philadelphia Eagles. He played college football for the Georgia Bulldogs.

== Early life ==
Tremble attended Warner Robins High School, where he started at safety in his last two years and also returned punts. He also practiced soccer.

He was classified as a proposition 48 student, so he had to enroll at Northeast Oklahoma Junior College to improve his grades. In two seasons, he started 10 out of 14 games at free safety, recording 46 tackles (25 solo), 2 interceptions (one returned for a touchdown), 16 passes defensed (led the team in both seasons), 2 forced fumbles and one fumble recovery. He also led the team in punt returns with 15 for 227 yards (15.1-yard avg.).

As a junior he transferred to the University of Georgia. He was named the starter at free safety, led the team with 3 interceptions and received All-SEC honors.

As a senior, he was moved to cornerback and tied for the team lead with 3 interceptions, while returning one for a touchdown. He also returned 2 kickoffs for 59 yards (29.5-yard avg.). He finished his college career with 22 starts, 182 tackles (118 solo), 6 interceptions, 12 passes defensed and 3 fumble recoveries.

== Professional career ==
Tremble was signed as an undrafted free agent by the Cleveland Browns after the 1994 NFL draft on May 10. On August 22, he was placed on the injured reserve list with a sprained ankle. He was waived on February 27, 1995.

On March 10, 1995, he signed as a free agent with the Dallas Cowboys. He was a reserve player, registering 6 defensive tackles and 6 special teams tackles. He appeared in 7 games and was released on October 18. The team would go on to win Super Bowl XXX.

On October 21, 1995, he was signed as a free agent by the Philadelphia Eagles. He appeared in 4 games before being released on November 21.

== Personal life ==
His son Tommy Tremble, is a tight end in the NFL for the Carolina Panthers.
