= Greenville, Pennsylvania =

Borough in Pennsylvania, US

- Borough
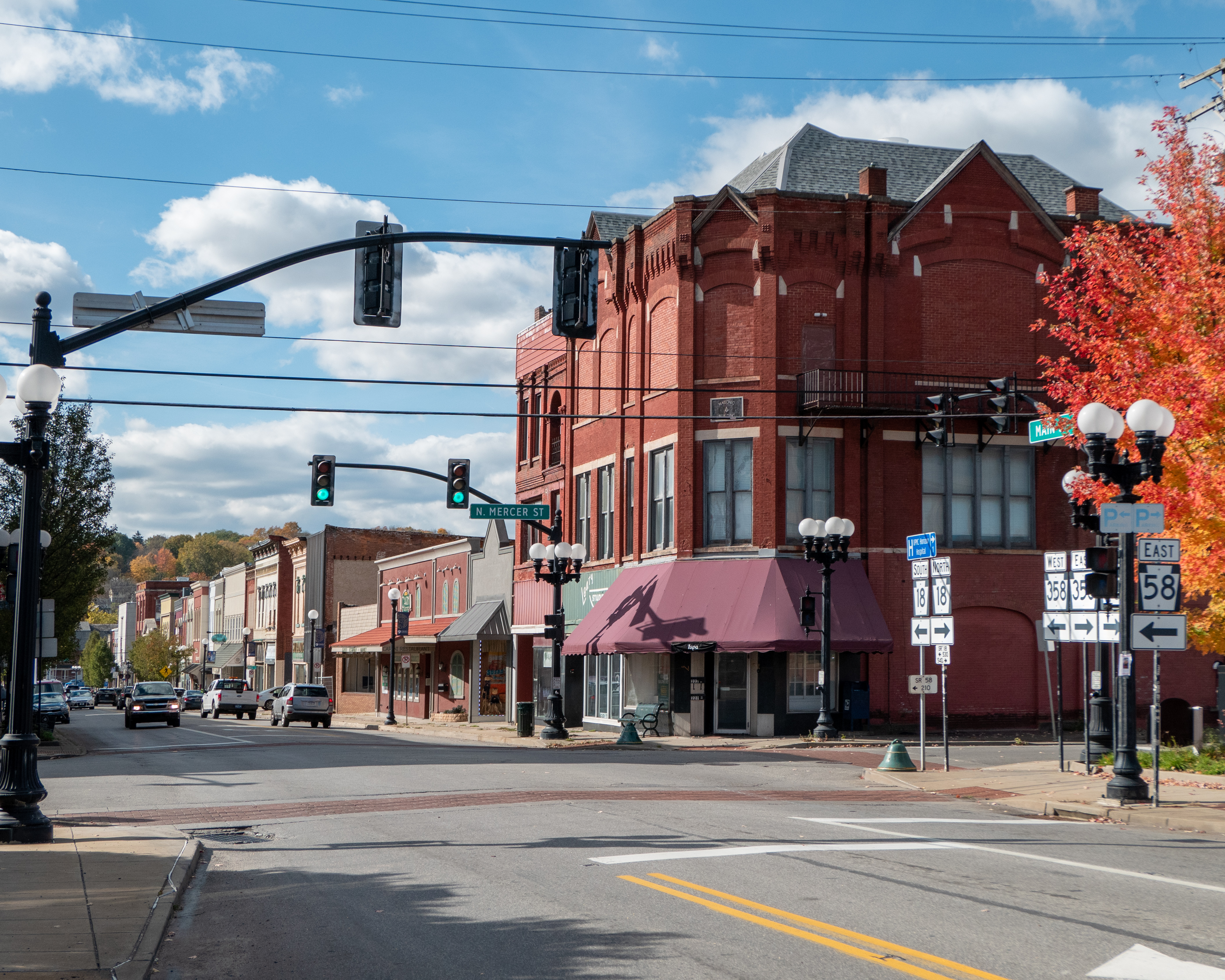
- Main Street

- Flag Seal Logo

- Location in Mercer County and the U.S. state of Pennsylvania.

- Location within Pennsylvania Location within the United States
- Coordinates: 41°24′18″N 80°23′12″W
- Country: United States
- State: Pennsylvania
- County: Mercer
- Established: 1819

Government
  - Mayor: Paul R Hamill

Area
  - Total: 1.89 sq mi (4.89 km^{2})
  - Land: 1.89 sq mi (4.89 km^{2})
  - Water: 0 sq mi (0.00 km^{2})
- Highest elevation (western border near PA 358): 1,190 ft (360 m)
- Lowest elevation (Shenango River): 918 ft (280 m)

Population (2020)
  - Total: 5,540
  - Density: 2,936.0/sq mi (1,133.58/km^{2})
- Time zone: UTC-4 (EST)
  - Summer (DST): UTC-5 (EDT)
- Zip code: 16125
- Area code: 724
- School district: Greenville Area
- FIPS code: 42-31328
- Website: www.greenvilleborough.com

Greenville is a borough with home rule status in northwestern Mercer County, Pennsylvania, United States. Located along the Shenango River, it lies roughly 80 miles from both Pittsburgh and Cleveland. It is 1.89 square miles in area, and had a population of 5,541 as of the 2020 census.

Incorporated as the Borough of West Greenville in 1836, it changed its name to the Borough of Greenville in 1865 and began to operate under a home rule charter on January 1, 2020, under the name of the "Town of Greenville." The origin of the name is speculated to have come from East Greenville, Pennsylvania. Greenville is part of the Hermitage micropolitan area.

It was home to the Werner Company, the world's largest manufacturer of step and extension ladders. Bail USA, a national bail bond company, and Anderson Coach & Travel, a prominent regional bus company, are based in Greenville.

== History ==
Greenville was known for its manufacturing interests, including railroad shops, bridge works, gristmills, a cement-block plant, an automobile factory, foundries and machine shops, saw and planing mills, steelworks, a railroad-car manufacturer, and flour mills. Water power was supplied by the Shenango River.

In 1900, 4,814 people lived in Greenville. That number rose to 5,909 by 1910, and stood at 10,000 in 1940. In 1950 there were 9,210 residents of Greenville. By 2000, the census showed a decline in population to 6,380.

Greenville was designated financially distressed in May 2002 by the Commonwealth of Pennsylvania under the Financially Distressed Municipalities Act. The designation was rescinded in November 2023 after improvement of the borough's fiscal situation.

The Greenville Commercial Historic District and Alexander P. and James S. Waugh House are listed on the National Register of Historic Places.

== Geography ==
Greenville is located in northwest Pennsylvania at 41°24′18″N 80°23′12″W (41.404998, −80.386651), along the Shenango River. Its altitude is 945 feet (288 m) above sea level.

== Demographics ==
Historical population
| Census | Pop. | Note | %± |
|---|---|---|---|
| 1870 | 1,848 | | — |
| 1880 | 3,007 | | 62.7% |
| 1890 | 3,674 | | 22.2% |
| 1900 | 4,814 | | 31.0% |
| 1910 | 5,969 | | 24.0% |
| 1920 | 8,101 | | 35.7% |
| 1930 | 8,628 | | 6.5% |
| 1940 | 8,149 | | −5.6% |
| 1950 | 9,210 | | 13.0% |
| 1960 | 8,765 | | −4.8% |
| 1970 | 8,704 | | −0.7% |
| 1980 | 7,730 | | −11.2% |
| 1990 | 6,734 | | −12.9% |
| 2000 | 6,380 | | −5.3% |
| 2010 | 5,919 | | −7.2% |
| 2020 | 5,540 | | −6.4% |
| 2021 (est.) | 5,499 | ▼ | −0.7% |

As of the census of 2000, there were 6,380 people, 2,464 households, and 1,471 families residing in the borough. The population density was 3,038.1 inhabitants per square mile (1,173.0/km^{2}). There were 2,723 housing units at an average density of 1,398.5 per square mile (540.0/km^{2}). The racial makeup of the borough was 96.33% White, 1.77% African American, 0.13% Native American, 0.82% Asian, 0.03% Pacific Islander, 0.20% from other races, and 0.72% from two or more races. Hispanic or Latino people of any race were 0.49% of the population.

The leading ancestries in Greenville are German at 28%, Irish at 12%, English at 12% and Italian at 10%.

There were 2,464 households, out of which 27.8% had children under the age of 18 living with them, 45.3% were married couples living together, 10.8% had a female householder with no husband present, and 40.3% were non-families. 35.1% of all households were made up of individuals, and 15.7% had someone living alone who was 65 years of age or older. The average household size was 2.28 and the average family size was 2.96.

In the borough the population was spread out, with 21.7% under the age of 18, 16.8% from 18 to 24, 24.8% from 25 to 44, 20.0% from 45 to 64, and 16.7% who were 65 years of age or older. The median age was 35 years. For every 100 females there were 89.6 males. For every 100 females age 18 and over, there were 85.6 males.

The median income for a household in the borough was $31,250, and the median income for a family was $38,869. Males had a median income of $31,324 versus $19,293 for females. The per capita income for the borough was $14,969. About 10.6% of families and 13.8% of the population were below the poverty line, including 22.7% of those under age 18 and 8.1% of those age 65 or over.

== Economy ==
The Werner Company, a manufacturer of ladders and construction equipment, was the largest employer in the city before it moved most of its offices out of Greenville in 2021. Werner's facilities were located in nearby Sugar Grove Township.

Major employers in Greenville include UPMC Horizon, Walmart, Thiel College, Greenville Area School District, and St. Paul's.

== Recreation and culture ==
The borough owns and maintains seven parks in Greenville, the biggest being Riverside Park, which houses its own recreation center, outdoor amphitheater, which was just newly renovated, and a new playground, which was built in 2012 by community volunteers. Riverside Park was previously home to the Greenville Memorial Pool, which opened in 1952 and closed in 2009. A sports complex is housed in the adjacent West Salem Township, where community softball, soccer and football programs are held.

The Greenville Area Chamber of Commerce promotes community development.

The Greenville Area Community Theatre is open to people ages 18 and over. The Penn-Ohio Young Actors Playhouse is located in Greenville and serves the Penn-Ohio area for ages 18 and under. Greenville also has its own symphony.

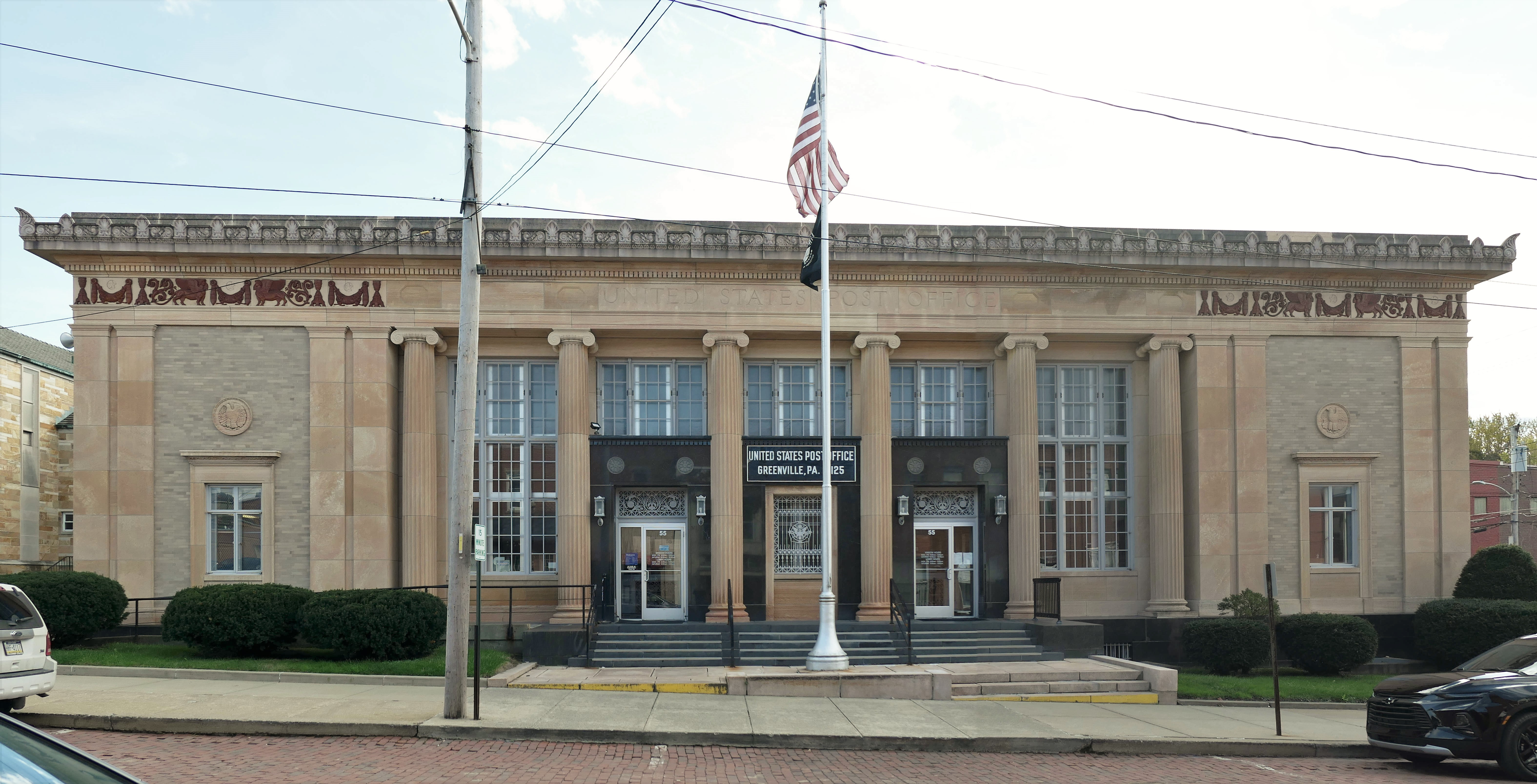
Greenville Post Office

The Greenville Area Public Library has served the area since 1921.

Greenville has three museums: the Greenville Area Historical Society at the Waugh House Museum, the Greenville Railroad Park and Museum, and the Erie Extension Canal Museum.

The Railroad Park and Museum displays, among other railroad equipment, the last extant 0-10-2 "Union" steam locomotive. Every year on the first weekend in July, "Heritage Days" is held. This includes a fireworks display, crafters and vendors, historical reenactments, children's activities, and the area's largest free car show. The Waugh House is the oldest brick house in Greenville, built in 1826.

The post office is considered among the finest of Depression-Era design, built under the WPA program during the Roosevelt administration.

== Education ==
The Greenville Area School District serves some of the area, and is divided into two buildings. The Reynolds Area School District serves some of the area, and is contained in two buildings.

Thiel College, a private liberal arts college, is located in Greenville.

== People ==
- Štefan Banič, inventor of one of the first parachute designs
- Adda Burch, former teacher, missionary, temperance activist, and reporter
- Charles Carr Clark, US Army colonel
- Janet Danahey, an American mass murderer
- Nicholas James (a.k.a. Nicholas J. Muscarella), American actor
- Gus Kefurt, Medal of Honor recipient
- Eric Kloss, jazz saxophonist
- Larry Lake, musician, radio personality, and record producer
- Bill Mitchell, former vice president of design, General Motors
- Nolan Reimold, former professional baseball player, Arizona Diamondbacks, Baltimore Orioles, and Toronto Blue Jays
- Naomi Whitehead is a supercentenarian and resident. As of her 115th birthday on Sept. 26, 2025, she is the oldest known living person in the USA, and the third oldest in the world.
