= Werner Co. =

Illinois-based manufacturing company

ProDriven Global Brands (formerly WernerCo)
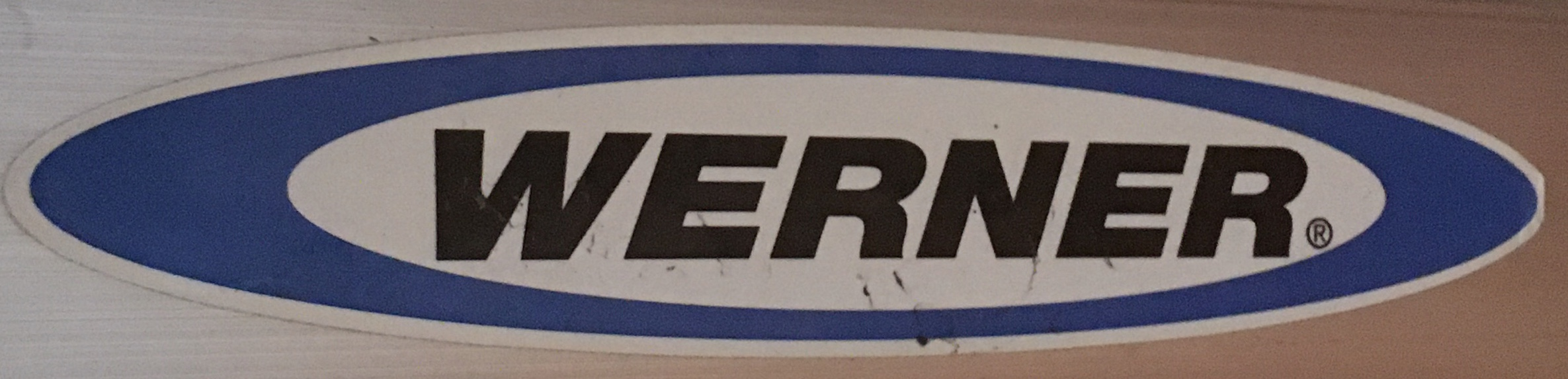
- Type: Private
- Industry: Manufacturing
- Headquarters: Itasca, Illinois, United States
- Divisions: Werner, ABRU, Bailey, Better Built, BoSS, centaure, duarib, Haemmerlin, Green Bull, Keller, KNAACK, WEATHER GUARD, Youngman, ZARGES
- Website: Corporate Site

Werner Co., which changed its corporate name to ProDriven Global Brands, is a privately owned company involved in the manufacturing and distribution of access equipment, fall protection products, secure storage systems and light-duty construction equipment for professional users in the construction, industrial and automotive industries.

The company's brand portfolio includes Werner, KNAACK, WEATHER GUARD, Better Built, Bailey, BoSS, Duarib and ZARGES, among others. ProDriven Global Brands is headquartered in Itasca, Illinois. Its customer care operations are located in West Middlesex, Pennsylvania.

== History ==
Werner Co. was founded in 1922 by Richard D. Werner as "R. D. Werner Co., Inc.," which specialized in metal moldings. R. D. Werner Co., Inc. became a leader in plastics extrusion during the World War II restrictions on civilian metal usage. After the war, Werner started working with aluminum and developed an emphasis on producing aluminum ladders. Werner began production of fiberglass ladders in 1963. In 1997, the company restructured, and sold a majority holding to the international investment group Investcorp S.A.

In December 2005, the Extruded Products Division (formerly WXP, Inc.) was sold to HIG Capital. Werner reported audited net sales of $472.3 million for the year ending Dec. 31, 2005. As of March 31, 2006, Werner reported assets of $201 million and liabilities of $473.4 million. Werner Co. filed for Chapter 11 protection under the bankruptcy code in Delaware on June 12, 2006, primarily due to excessive leverage, significant increases in raw material costs, and the loss of one of its largest customers. On June 8, 2007, a new company was formed by the major creditors to purchase substantially all the assets of the old company.

In September 2012, Werner Co. acquired Knaack LLC from Emerson Electric for $115 million. The acquisition added the KNAACK jobsite storage and WEATHER GUARD truck and van equipment brands to the company's portfolio, expanding its presence in the professional storage market.

On July 24, 2017, funds advised by private equity firm Triton completed the acquisition of WernerCo. At the time of the acquisition, the company manufactured and distributed access products, fall protection equipment, secure storage systems and light duty construction equipment internationally.

In January 2018, WernerCo completed the acquisition of the Germany-based ZARGES Group, expanding its portfolio of access equipment and storage products in the European market.

Werner acquired Better Built tool boxes in 2019.

On August 5, 2024, WernerCo changed its corporate name to ProDriven Global Brands to reflect the expansion of its international brand portfolio beyond its original ladder and access equipment business. The change did not affect the individual product brands, including Werner, KNAACK and WEATHER GUARD.

In July 2026, the Werner brand opened the Werner Height Safety Center in Austin, Texas, a facility focused on fall protection training, product development and customer collaboration.
