= Alexander P. and James S. Waugh House =

Historic house in Pennsylvania, United States

- U.S. National Register of Historic Places
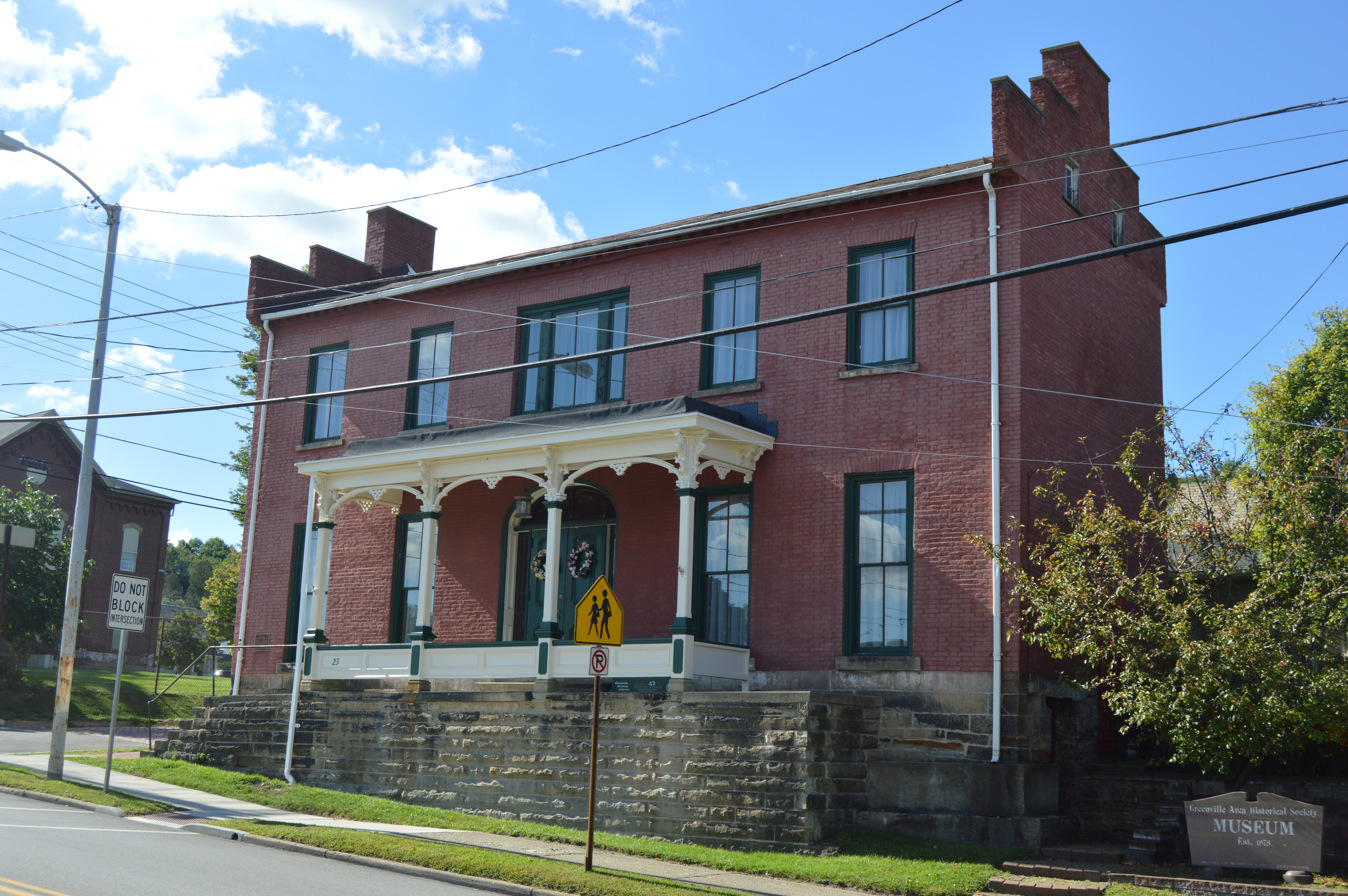
- Front and eastern side

- Location within Pennsylvania Location within the United States
- Location: 23 W. Main St., Greenville, Pennsylvania
- Coordinates: 41°24′8″N 80°19′31″W
- Area: less than one acre
- Built: 1826
- Architectural style: Federal
- NRHP reference No.: 98000402
- Added to NRHP: April 23, 1998

The Alexander P. and James S. Waugh House is an historic home that is located in Greenville, Mercer County, Pennsylvania, United States.

It was added to the National Register of Historic Places in 1998.

== History and architectural features ==
Built in 1826, this historic structure is a two-story, five-bay, L-shaped, brick residence with a stepped gable. Designed in the Federal style, it sits on a cut sandstone foundation. The front facade has a three-bay-wide entrance porch with a hipped roof, and a tripartite center window on the second floor.
