= Greenville Commercial Historic District (Greenville, Pennsylvania) =

Historic district in Pennsylvania, United States

- U.S. National Register of Historic Places
- U.S. Historic district
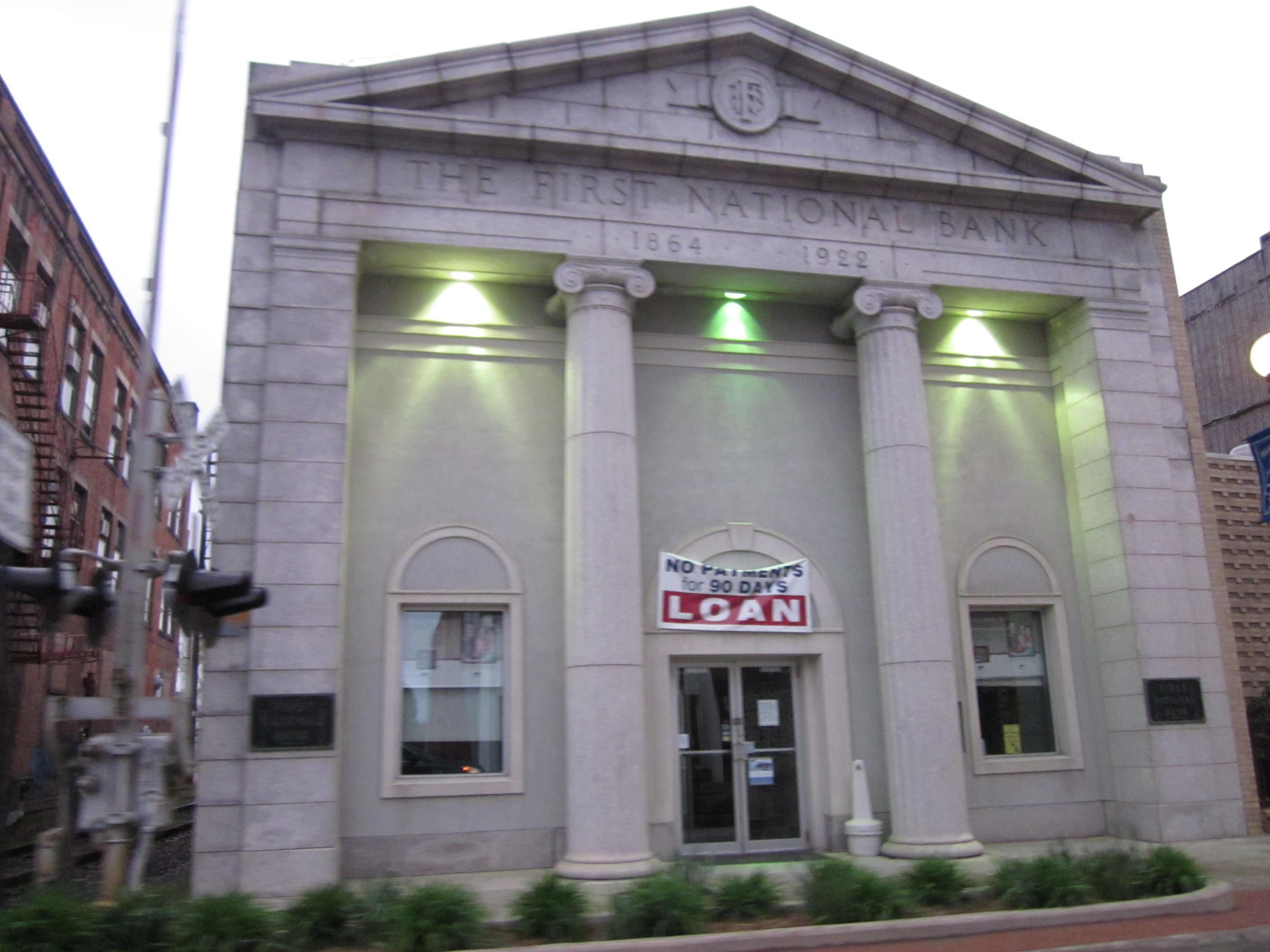
- Bank in the middle of the district

- Location within Pennsylvania Location within the United States
- Location: Centered on Main, Canal and Clinton Sts., Greenville, Pennsylvania
- Coordinates: 41°24′26″N 80°23′20″W
- Area: 9.4 acres (3.8 ha)
- Built: 1871
- Architect: Foulk, Samuel H.; Owsley, C. H.
- Architectural style: Italianate, Art Deco, et al.
- NRHP reference No.: 00000964
- Added to NRHP: August 10, 2000

The Greenville Commercial Historic District is a national historic district which is located at Greenville, Mercer County, Pennsylvania.

It was added to the National Register of Historic Places in 2000.

== History and architectural features ==
The district includes forty-eight contributing buildings, which are located in the central business district of Greenville. The majority of the contributing buildings were built after major fires in 1871 and 1873, and are largely brick with Italianate style design influences.

Notable buildings include the U.S Post Office, which was built in 1938, the Bessemer Depot, which was erected in 1905, the Lake Erie Railroad Depot, the Packard Commercial Building, which was built between 1857 and 1858, the Livingston Morrison Building, the Masonic Block, the Mathers Building, which was erected in 1873, and the Art Deco style N.N. Moss Building.
