= Haemmerlin =

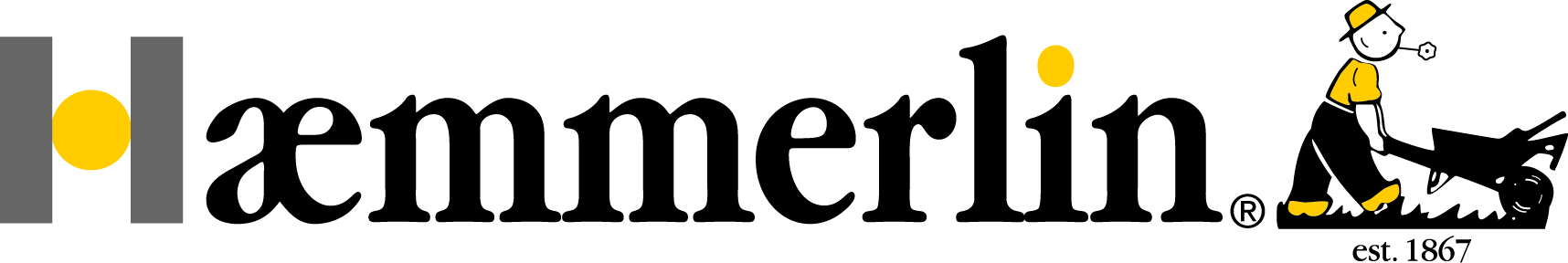
- Industry: Mechanical industry
- Founded: Saverne, France (October 25, 1867)
- Founder: Charles HAEMMERLIN
- Headquarters: Romilly-sur-Andelle (Eure) France.
- Number of locations: Saverne, France
- Area served: Worldwide
- Products: wheelbarrows, sack trucks, hose reels, hoists, winches, roofing platforms, rubbish chutes, safety barriers, specialist trays for concrete and mortar, trestles, concrete mixers
- Parent: CDH Group
- Website: www.haemmerlin.com/accueil

Haemmerlin is a French company, founded in 1867 and based in Alsace. Haemmerlin manufactures in excess of one million products a year. The full range includes wheelbarrows, sack trucks, hose reels, hoists, winches, roofing platforms, rubbish chutes, safety barriers, specialist trays for concrete and mortar, trestles, concrete mixers and various equipment used on construction sites.

== Haemmerlin's logo evolution ==
The little man ("Le petit bonhomme") named "Georges" pushing his wheelbarrow appeared in 1950. Despite his hard work being eased by human invention, George was seen smoking his pipe. In 1982, recognising the harms of tobacco to health, "Georges" gave up smoking and replaced his pipe with a flower.

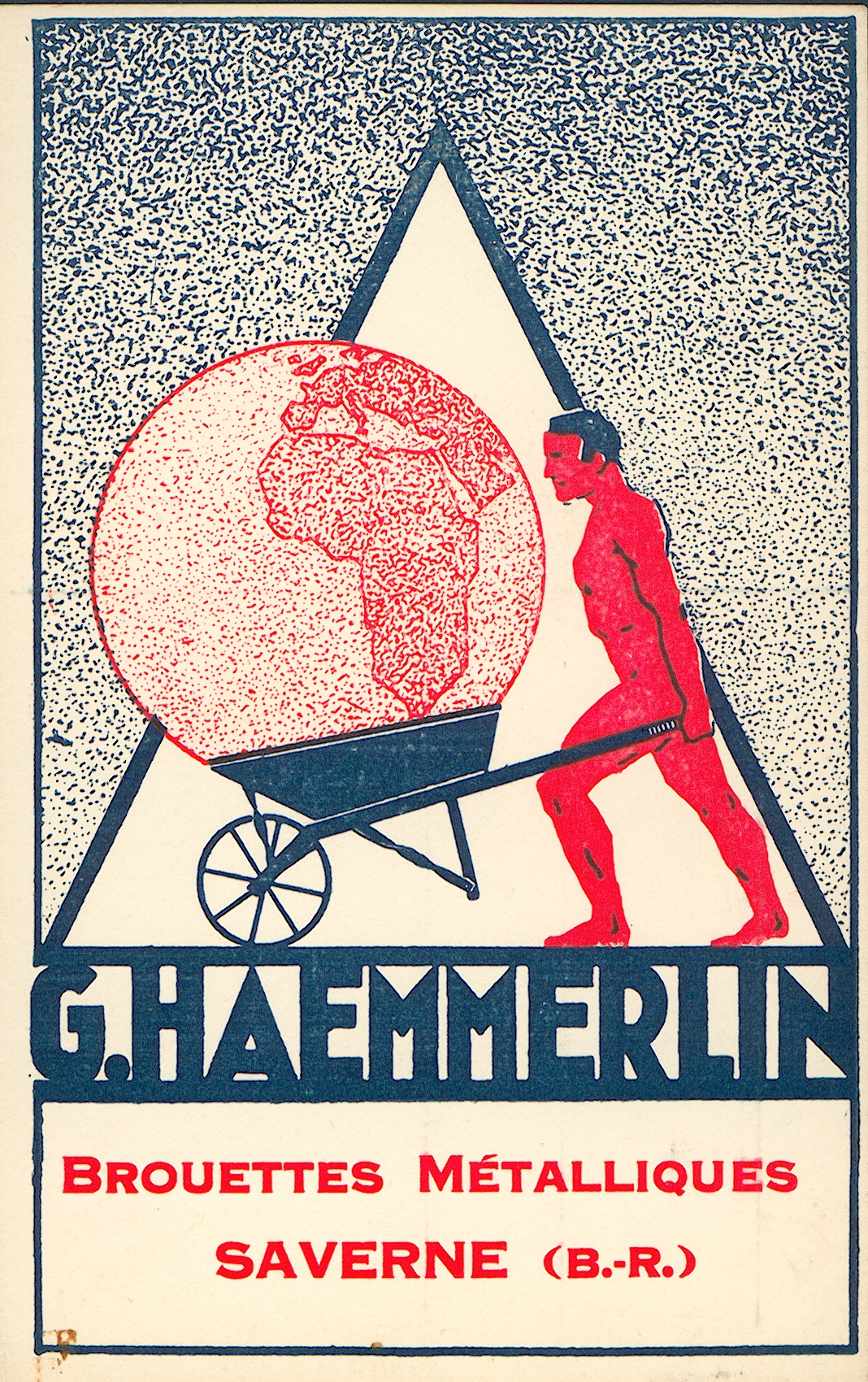
Logo in 1895

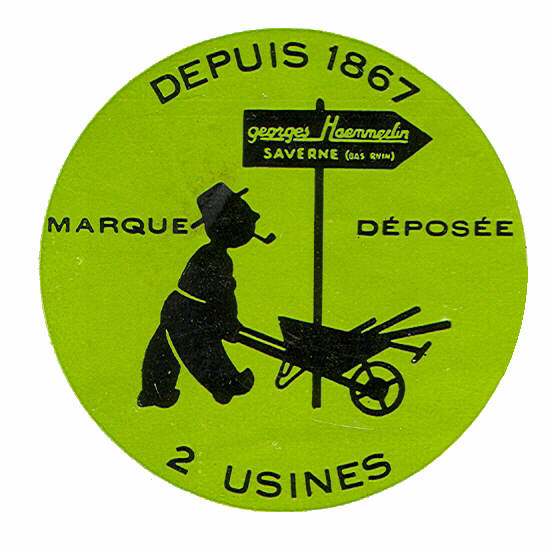
Logo in 1950

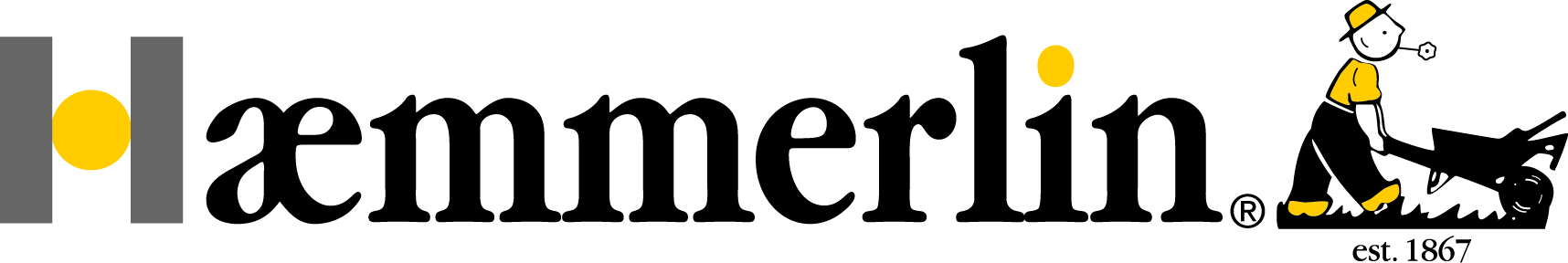
Current logo

== History ==
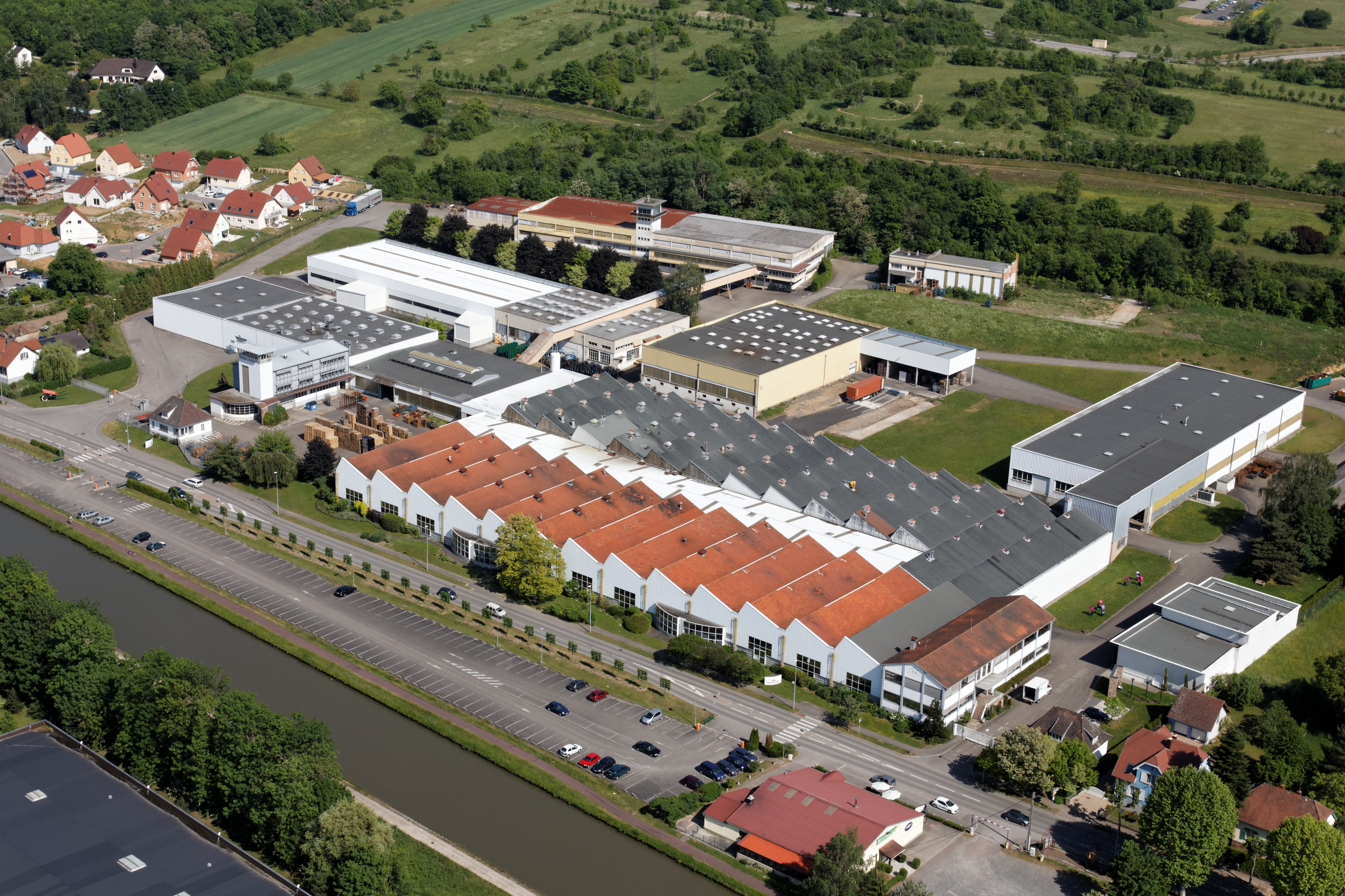
Factory Haemmerlin de Saverne

=== 19th Century ===
- 25 October 1867: Charles Haemmerlin established a foundry and metal workshop in Saverne, France, producing wrought iron gates, baker's ovens, charcoal extinguishers, kneading troughs and fountains.
- 1890: the workshop soon became too small and the local family business moved to larger premises and a new factory.
- 1895: Charle's son Georges Haemmerlin joined the family business and launched a new activity: the manufacture of metal wheelbarrows. Demand increased and orders came in from Alsace, Lorraine and further afield from Paris, Brussels and Africa.

=== 20th Century ===
- 1930: Jean-Louis and Emile, the founder's grandchildren joined the business. Jean-Louis Haemmerlin supported business development while his brother Emile modernized production.
- 1945: after working through the dark years of the war, the two brothers restarted production and began growth into the export market.
- 1952: the brother's efforts enabled the company to build a new plant, in which the brothers saw, further developments into the construction industry.
- 1953: introduction of the first hoists from the factory. Complementing a growing range of products already established in production.
- 1981: Bernard Haemmerlin, son of Emile and 4th generation Haemmerlin, joined the company and started complete automation of the production system. A century after the company's formation, the strategic choices made by Bernard Haemmerlin improved the business productivity and reduced lead-times dramatically.
- 1995: an excess of one million units per year were being produced in the automated factory at Saverne. The company is European leader on its market and was granted several patents.

=== 21st Century ===
- 2003: launching a generation of motorized Wheelbarrows.
- 2004: acquisition of the Italian company Goffi Industrie Edilizia SRL, specialising in the assembly of scaffoldings and struts.
- 2005: the 45000 m^{2} factory installed in Saverne since 1867 expands its so-called "Studio" that was built in 1967, with a new building containing an exposition room, a meeting room and a formation area. The same year, Haemmerlin takes over the English leader of wheelbarrows and sack-trucks: the Chillington Ltd corporation. Thus strengthening its position overseas in the UK.
- 2011: after several years of collaboration between the different services and the introduction of common products, Haemmerlin, Centaure and Duarib combine under the banner of CDH Group.

== 2007 The "Plume 140 ans" ==
Haemmerlin celebrated its 140 years. To celebrate the landmark of 140 years of wheelbarrow production, the company offered all its worker a wheelbarrow called "Plume" (feather - because of its light weight). It also had the typical colours of the French TGV which now stops in Saverne.

== Haemmerlin roses ==
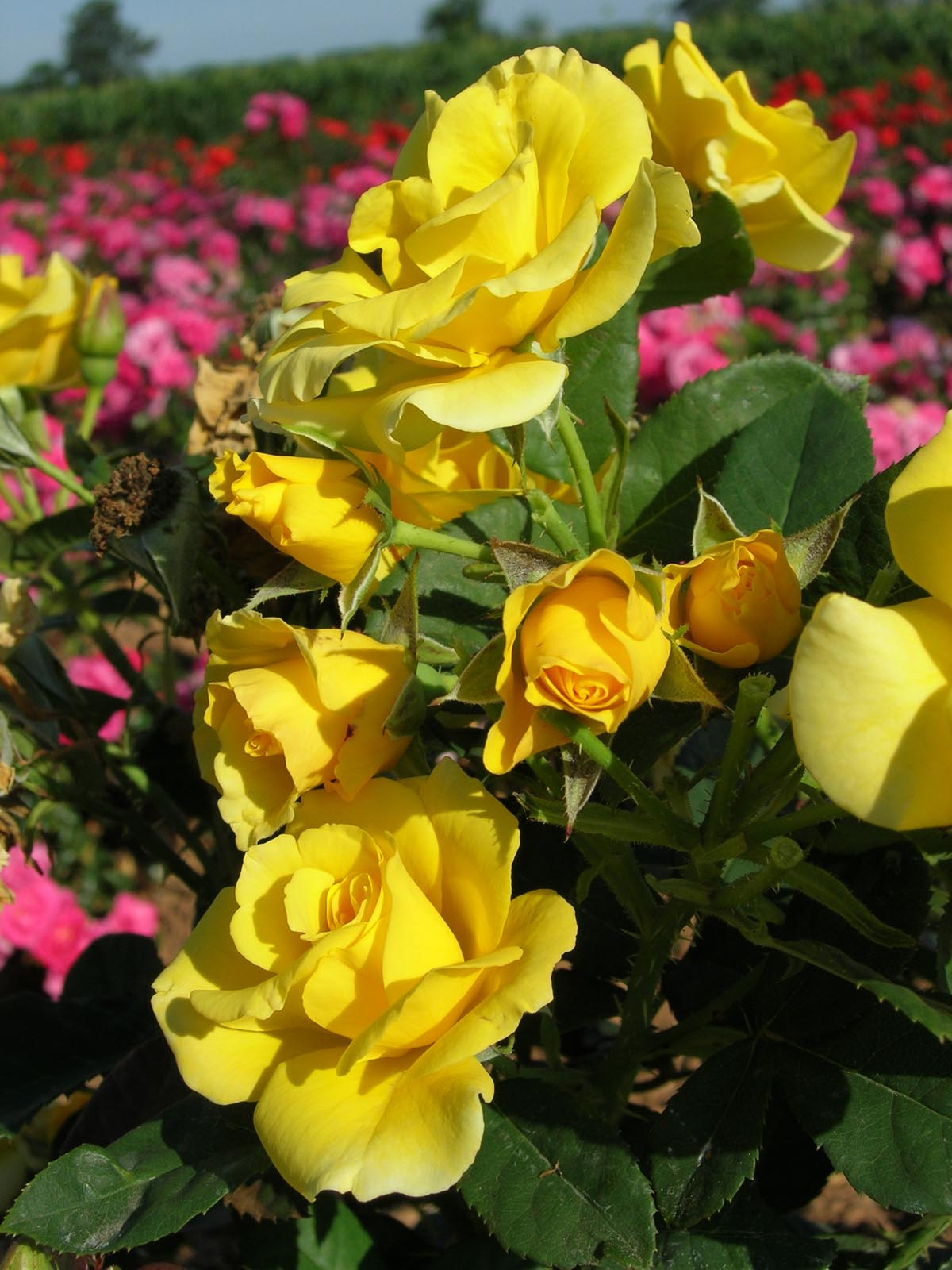
Haemmerlin variety of roses.

To celebrate Haemmerlin's 140 year anniversary, horticulturist Laperriere was asked to grow a new variety of rose, the Haemmerlin rose, the colour of which reflects the buttercup flower and the company's logo.

During the 82nd New International Flower contest in Saverne, it won the award of "Prize of the City of Saverne".
