= McConnell-Talbert Stadium =

Sports stadium in Warner Robins, Georgia

Coordinates: 32.612114°N 83.611965°W

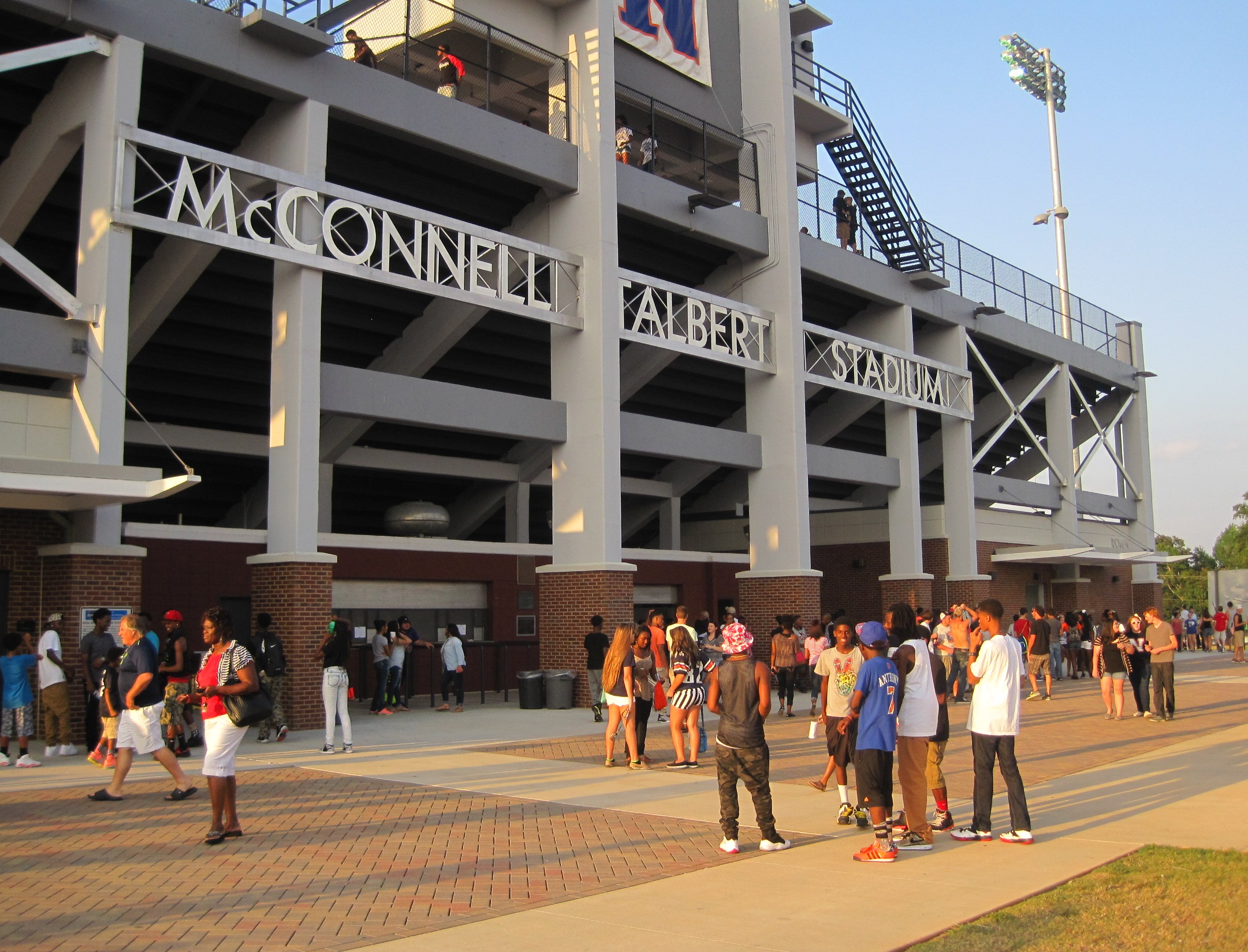
Entrance view for the home team fans at McConnell-Talbert Stadium

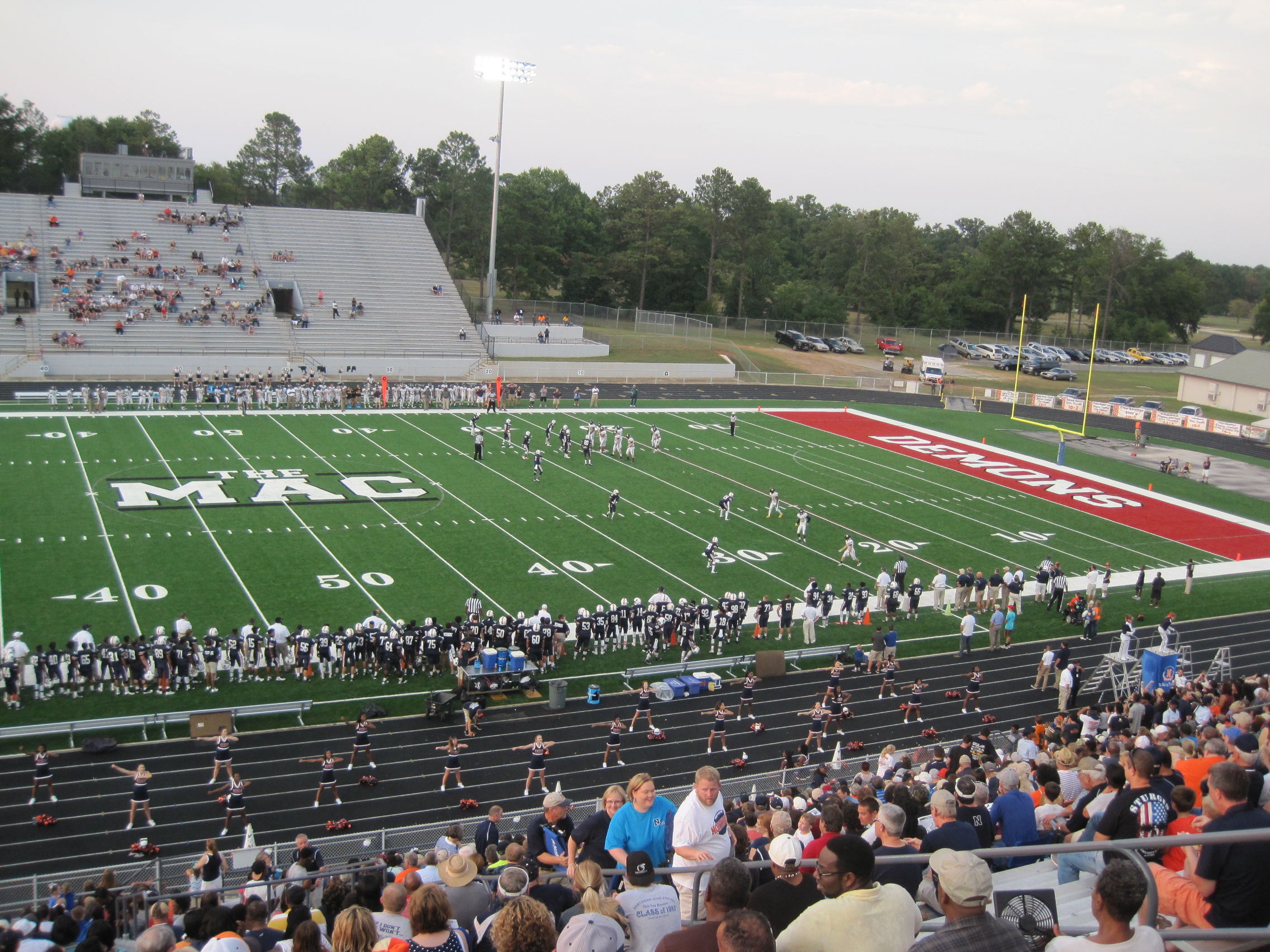
Artificial turf replaced the grass playing surface in 2015.

McConnell-Talbert Stadium is a sports stadium in Warner Robins, Georgia that often plays host to games and competitions for Warner Robins High and Northside High. It is located at 400 South Davis Drive Warner Robins, GA 31088 across from Warner Robins High School. It is named after LA McConnell, Sr. and Dr. W.G. Talbert, Jr. The stadium is colloquially known as "The Mac."

Originally constructed in 1968, the stadium received $2.92 million in major renovations during 2013, including a new visitor side press box, storm water upgrades, lighting upgrades, and restroom upgrades. Parrish Construction Group was the builder and Southern A&E was the architect on the project.

This stadium was originally named International City Stadium. It was dedicated on November 10, 1969 during the annual Warner Robins–Northside rivalry game.

During the 2014 football playoffs, the playing surface was in such poor condition that two home games could not be played at McConnell-Talbert Stadium and had to be moved to neutral fields away from Houston County. The Houston County Board of Education made the decision to correct this problem by replacing the grass with artificial turf manufactured by FieldTurf. This new turf was installed during the summer of 2015 and was completed in time for football season.

The west end zone was colored in blue for the Northside Eagles and the east end zone was colored in red for the Warner Robins Demons. In true rivalry fashion, the end zone locations were determined for each rivalry school with a coin flip decided by the 2 head football coaches from each school in 2015. Warner Robins High head coach Brian Way won the toss over Northside High head coach Kevin Kinsler. In selecting the east end zone for Warner Robins High, Coach Brian Way insured the Demons would maintain their traditional area of the field to conduct pregame warm-ups. Northside was relegated to the normal visiting team warm-up area of the west end zone.

The Houston County High School Bears played their home football games at McConnell-Talbert Stadium through the 2015 season. Once Freedom Field was constructed and ready for use in 2016, it became Houston County High's new home stadium.

For thirty-three years, crowds viewed the annual Warner Robins Independence Day concert and fireworks show from the inside of McConnell-Talbert Stadium. After the artificial turf was installed, the venue was moved outside to the stadium's parking lot because of concerns that the turf would be damaged by the large crowd that had traditionally sat on the grass football playing field.
