= Allison and Roberto Mignone Halls of Gems and Minerals =

Exhibition halls at the American Museum of Natural History in New York City

Coordinates: 40.781°N 73.974°W

The Allison and Roberto Mignone Halls of Gems and Minerals are a series of exhibition halls at the American Museum of Natural History on the Upper West Side in Manhattan, New York City. The halls opened on June 12, 2021, as a complete redesign of their predecessors, the Harry Frank Guggenheim Hall of Gems and Minerals and Morgan Memorial Hall of Gems. The halls feature thousands of rare gems, mineral specimens and pieces of jewelry.

== History ==
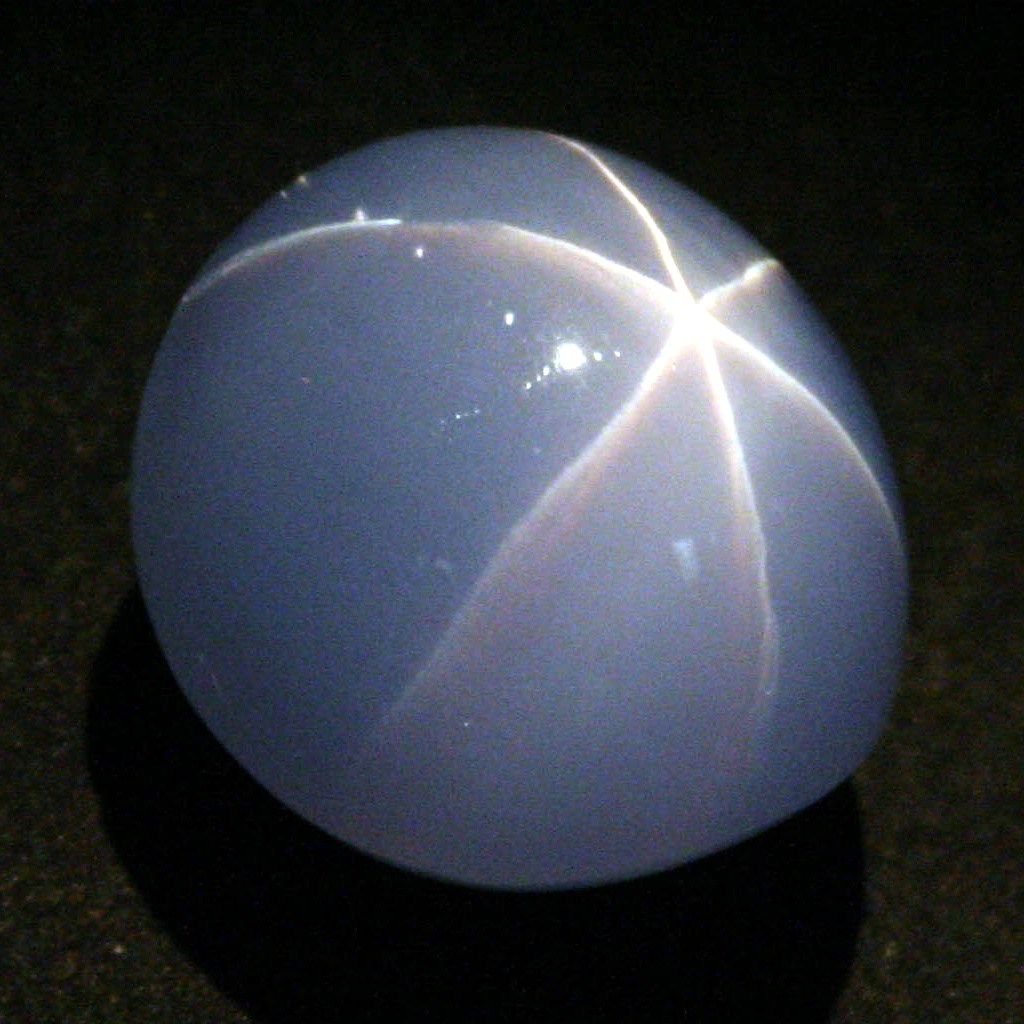
The Star of India, one of many gems stolen in a 1964 heist; it was later recovered from a bus locker.

The Mignone Halls replaced two permanent exhibits, the Guggenheim and Morgan Memorial halls, which previously displayed specimens from the museum's mineral and gem collections. The Harry Frank Guggenheim Hall of Minerals housed hundreds of unusual geological specimens. It adjoined the Morgan Memorial Hall of Gems that showcased many rare, and valuable gemstones. At the time of its completion in 1976, the Guggenheim Hall was praised as "one of the finest museum installations that New York or any city has seen in some years" by New York Times critic Paul Goldberger, who also complimented the space for its dynamic use of curves, ramps, steps, and level changes, and soft atmosphere.

The Guggenheim and Morgan halls featured the Star of India, the Eagle Diamond, the DeLong Star Ruby and the Midnight Star, which were stolen from the museum on October 29, 1964. The burglars, who included Jack Murphy, gained entrance by climbing through a bathroom window they had unlocked hours before the museum was closed. The DeLong Star Ruby and the Midnight Star were both recovered. Weeks later, the Star of India was later recovered from a locker in a Miami bus station, but the Eagle Diamond was never found; it may have been recut or lost. The DeLong Star Ruby was recovered for a $25,000 ransom, paid by Florida businessman John D. MacArthur. By 2017, the same features that had made the exhibit cutting-edge were seen as outdated. The vice president for exhibitions at the museum compared the old layout to a labyrinth, and called it mysterious. On October 26, 2017, the exhibit closed to undergo a $32 million redesign by Ralph Appelbaum Associates. The redesigned halls were scheduled to be completed in 2020 to correspond with the museum's 150th anniversary, but their reopening was delayed by the COVID-19 pandemic. On June 12, 2021, the renovated halls reopened to the general public.

== Exhibits ==
=== Old exhibits ===
On display were many renowned samples that were chosen from among the museum's more than 100,000 pieces. Among these were the Patricia Emerald, a 632 carat (126 g) stone that is considered one of the world's great emeralds for its size and color, and also because it is dihexagonal, or 12-sided. It was discovered in 1920 in a mine high in the Colombian Andes. The Patricia is one of the few large gem-quality emeralds that remains uncut. Also on display was the 563 carat (113 g) Star of India, the largest, and most famous, star sapphire in the world. It was discovered over 300 years ago in Sri Lanka, most likely in the sands of ancient river beds from where sapphires continue to be found today. It was donated to the museum by the financier J.P. Morgan. The thin, radiant, six pointed star, or asterism, is created by incoming light that reflects from needle-like crystals of the mineral rutile which are found within the sapphire. The Star of India is polished into the shape of a cabochon, or dome, to enhance the star's beauty. Among other notable specimens on display were a 596-pound (270 kg) topaz, a 4.5 ton block of blue azurite/malachite ore that was found in the Copper Queen Mine in Bisbee, Arizona at the start of the 20th century; and a rare, 100 carat (20 g) orange-colored padparadschan sapphire from Sri Lanka, considered "the mother of all pads." The collection also included the Midnight Star Ruby, a 116.75-carat deep purplish-red star ruby.

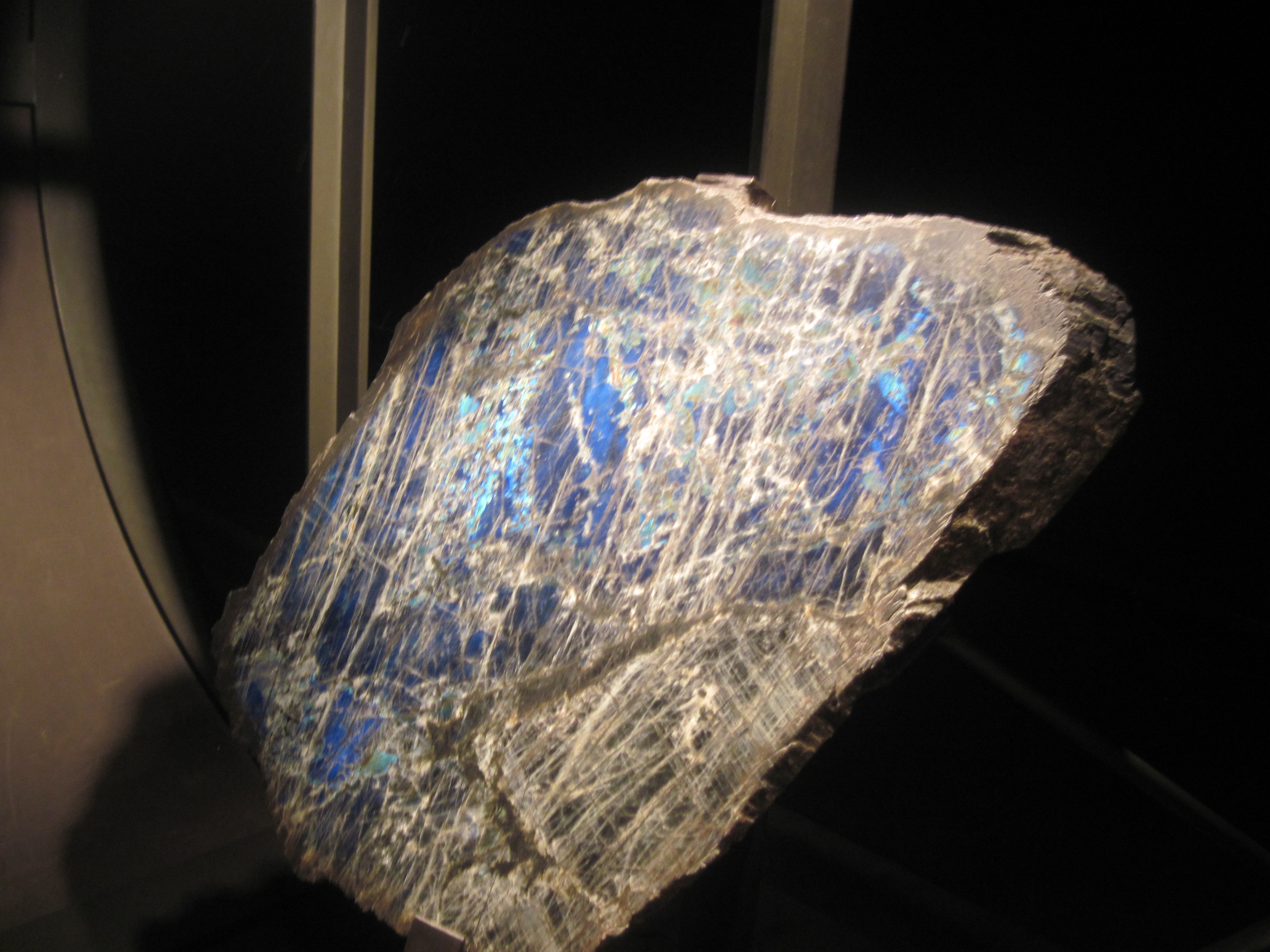
Labradorite specimen

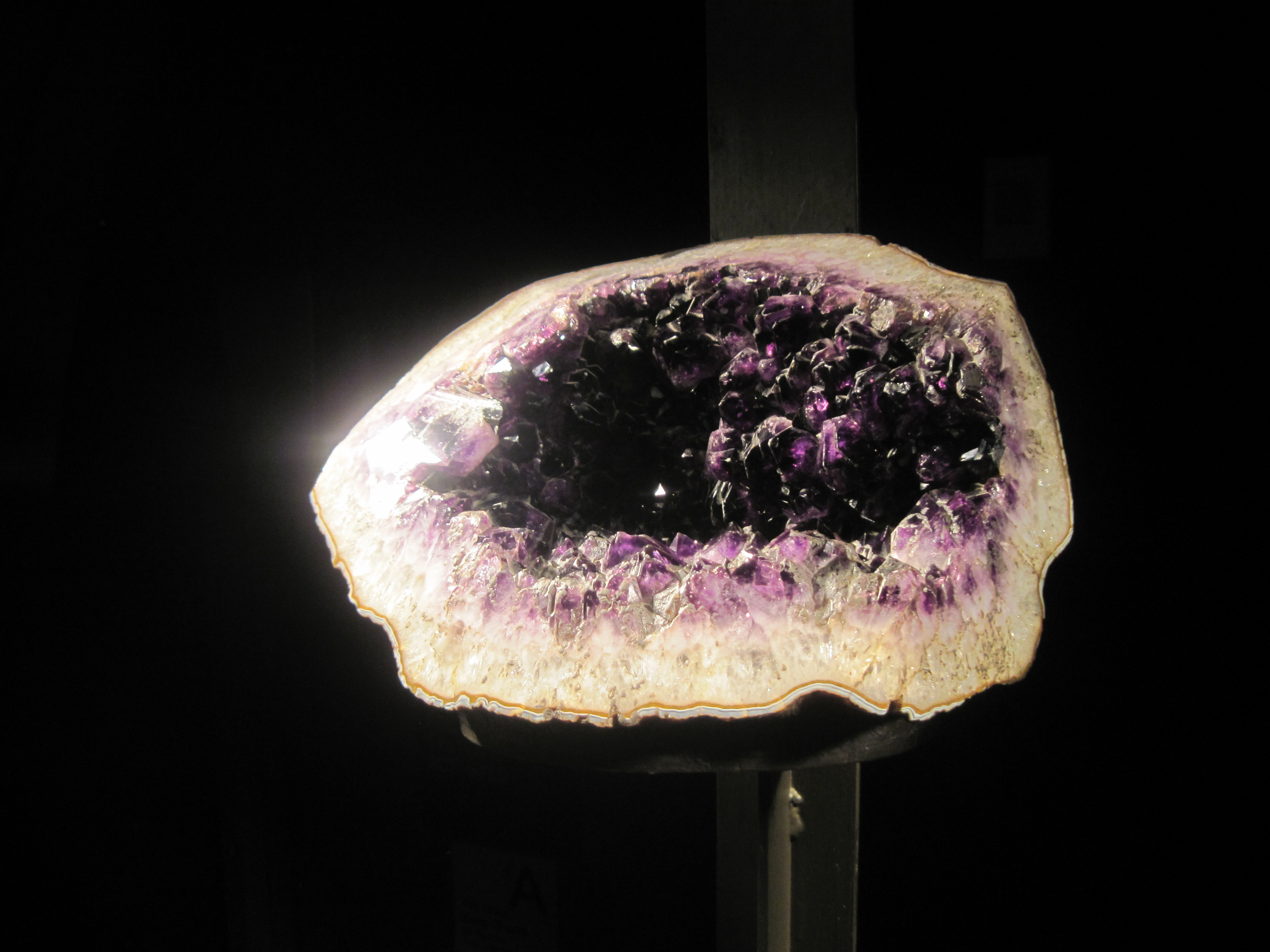
Quartz var. amethyst geode

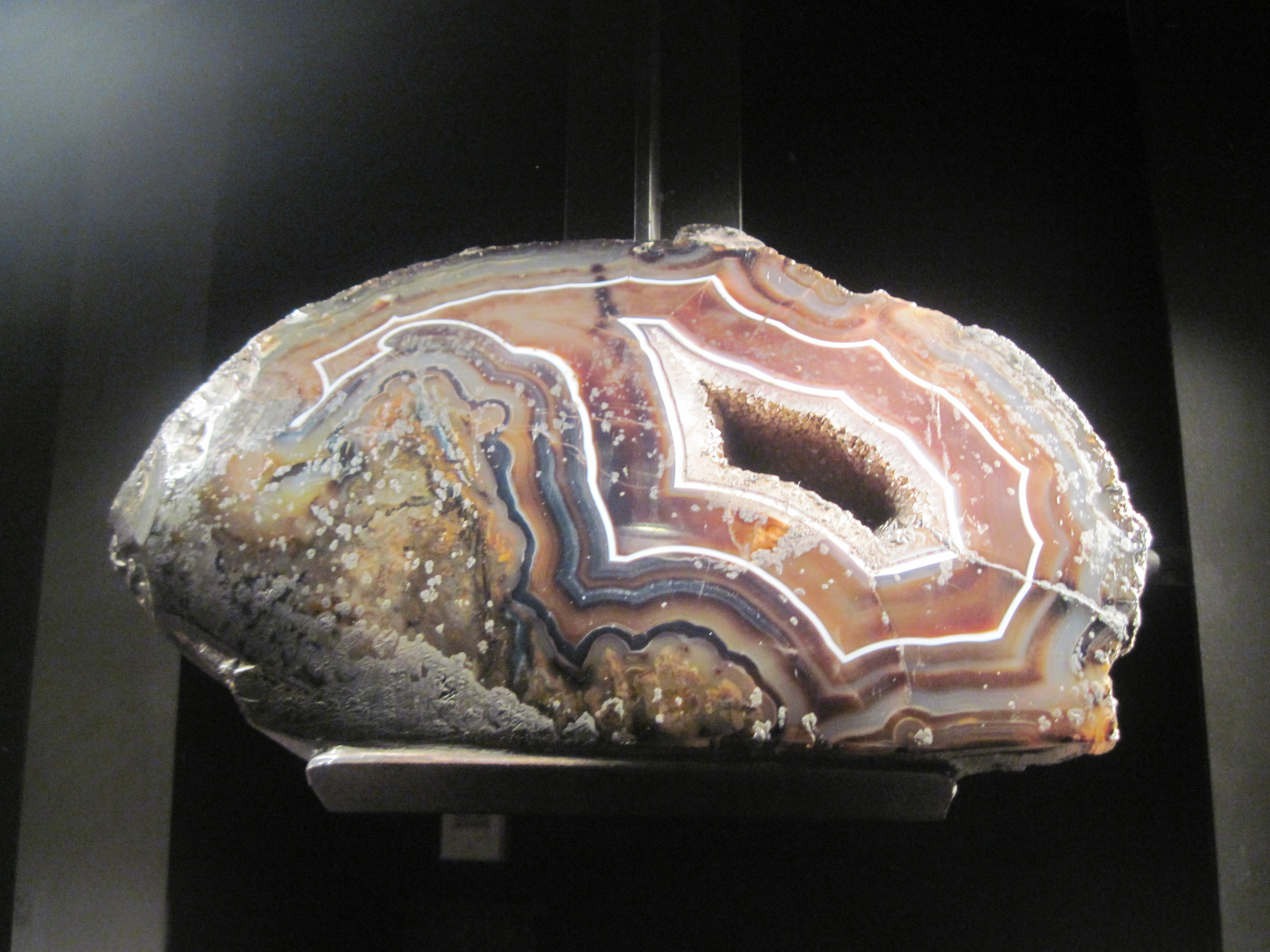
Quartz var. agate geode

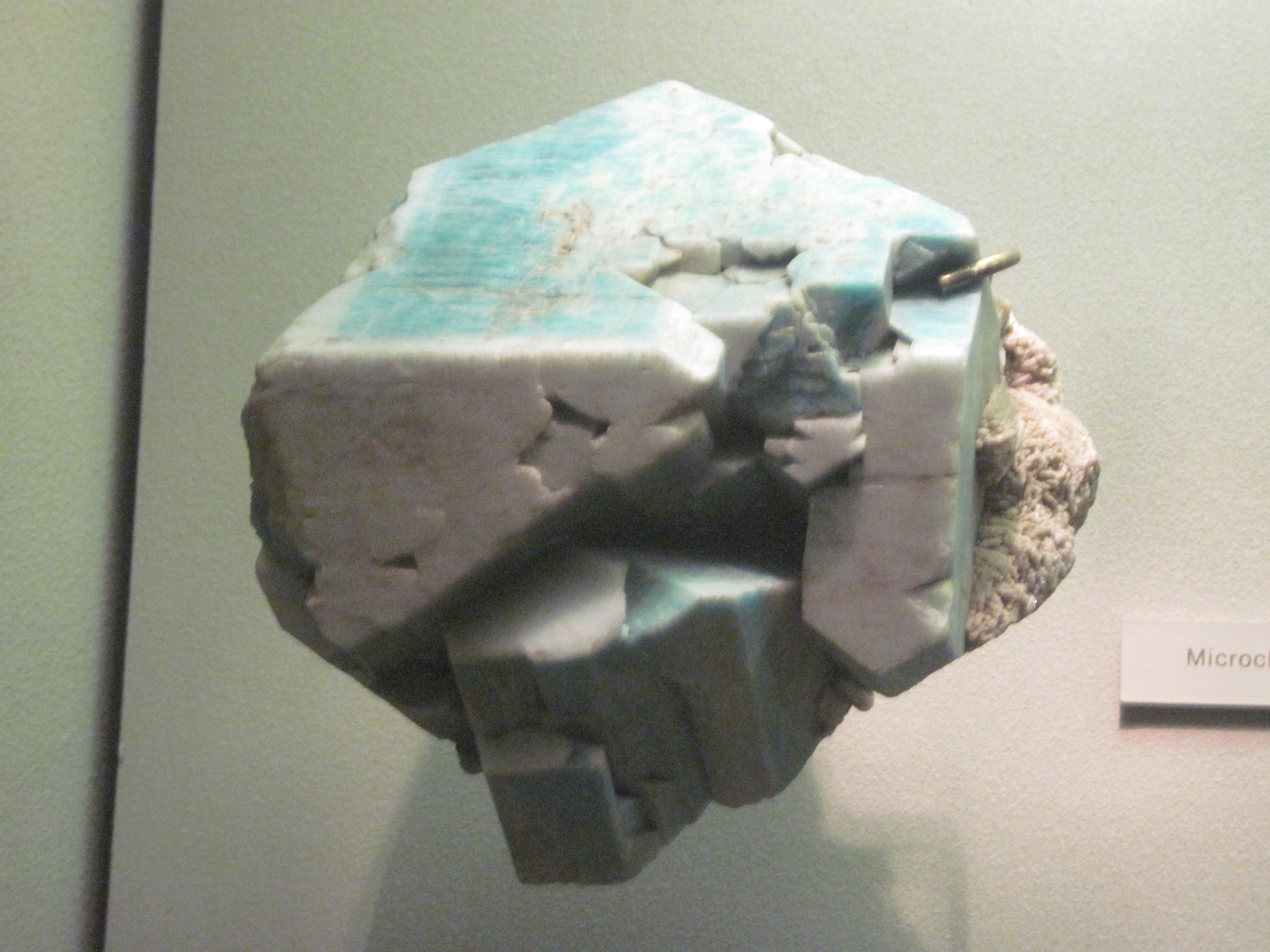
Microcline specimen

=== New exhibits ===
The new exhibits explore a range of topics, including the diversification of mineral species over the course of Earth's history, plate tectonics, and the stories of specific gems. They have adopted newer philosophies in exhibit design, including a focus on storytelling, interactivity, and connecting ideas across disciplines.

Notable exhibits include:

- The Star of India - a 563-carat star sapphire, the largest of its kind in the world.
- The DeLong Star Ruby - a 100-carat stone discovered in Burma in the 1930s.
- The Patricia Emerald - a 12-sided 632-carat emerald found in Colombia in 1920, unique because it was never cut into a gem shape.
- The Brazilian Princess Topaz - a light blue gemstone weighing 9.5 pounds, considered to be the largest cut gemstone in the world.
- The Subway Garnet - a nine-pound almandine garnet measuring almost six inches in diameter, discovered during a sewer excavation in New York City in 1885.
