= Thomas Sugden =

Thomas Sugden may refer to:

- Thomas Sugden (farmer-politician), English American immigrant, farmer, and Wisconsin pioneer
- Thomas Sugden (footballer), English football goalkeeper
