= Star of India (gem) =

563.35-carat star sapphire

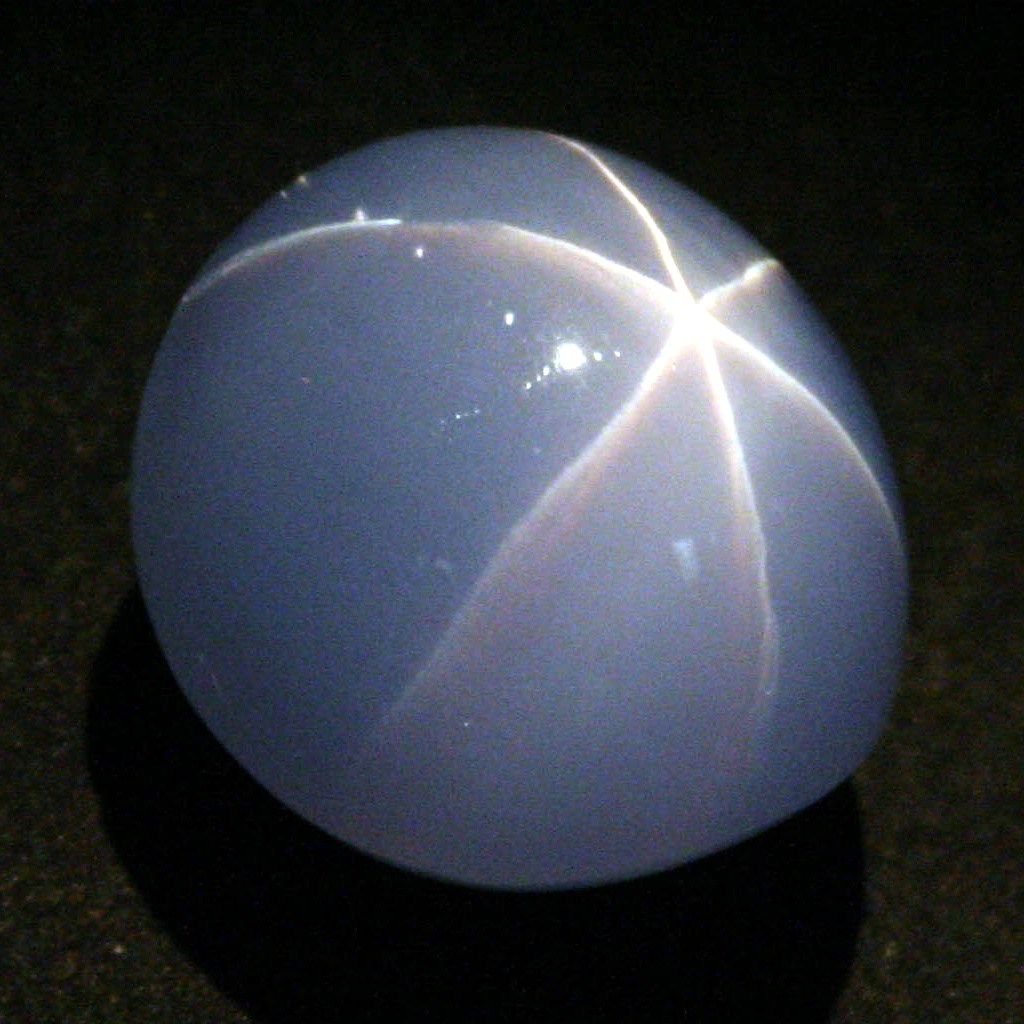
Star of India

The Star of India is a 563.35-carat (112.67 g) star sapphire, one of the largest such gems in the world. (Note: The Star of Adam is believed to be the largest star sapphire at 1,404.49 carats.) It is almost flawless and is unusual in that it has stars on both sides of the stone. The greyish-blue gem was mined in Sri Lanka and is housed in the American Museum of Natural History in New York City.

The milky quality of the stone is caused by the traces of the mineral rutile, which is also responsible for the star effect, known as asterism. The tiny fibers of the mineral, aligned in a three-fold pattern within the gem, reflect incoming light into the star pattern.

== History ==
Mineralogist and Tiffany gem expert George Kunz (1856–1932) was commissioned by wealthy financier J. P. Morgan (1837–1913) to acquire an impressive gem collection for an exhibit at the Paris Exposition of 1900; the Star of India was among the stones Kunz procured. The Star of India is a huge blue star sapphire weighing 563.35 carats. It is cut en cabochon. A British Army officer brought it to London, where it was cut by Albert Ramsay around 1905. Morgan donated the Star of India along with the rest of the collection to the American Museum of Natural History. Apart from its Sri Lankan origin, the gem's history prior to its acquisition for this collection is unknown. Kunz wrote in 1913 that the Star of India "has a more or less indefinite historic record of some three centuries".

On 29 October 1964, the famous golf-ball-sized stone was stolen, along with several other gems of note, including the Midnight Star, the DeLong Star Ruby, and the Eagle Diamond. The thieves unlocked a bathroom window during museum open hours, climbed in that night, and found that the sapphire was the only gem in the collection protected by an alarm—and the battery for that was dead. The stones stolen were valued at more than $400,000. Within two days the culprits were arrested: Jack Roland Murphy (also known as "Murph the Surf"), Allan Kuhn and Roger Clark; however, the gems had already been handed off. In January 1965, in a bid for leniency, Kuhn led authorities to a bus locker in Miami where the uninsured Star of India and some of the other stolen stones were recovered.

== See also ==
- List of individual gemstones
- List of sapphires by size
