= Mukwonago, Wisconsin =

- Village
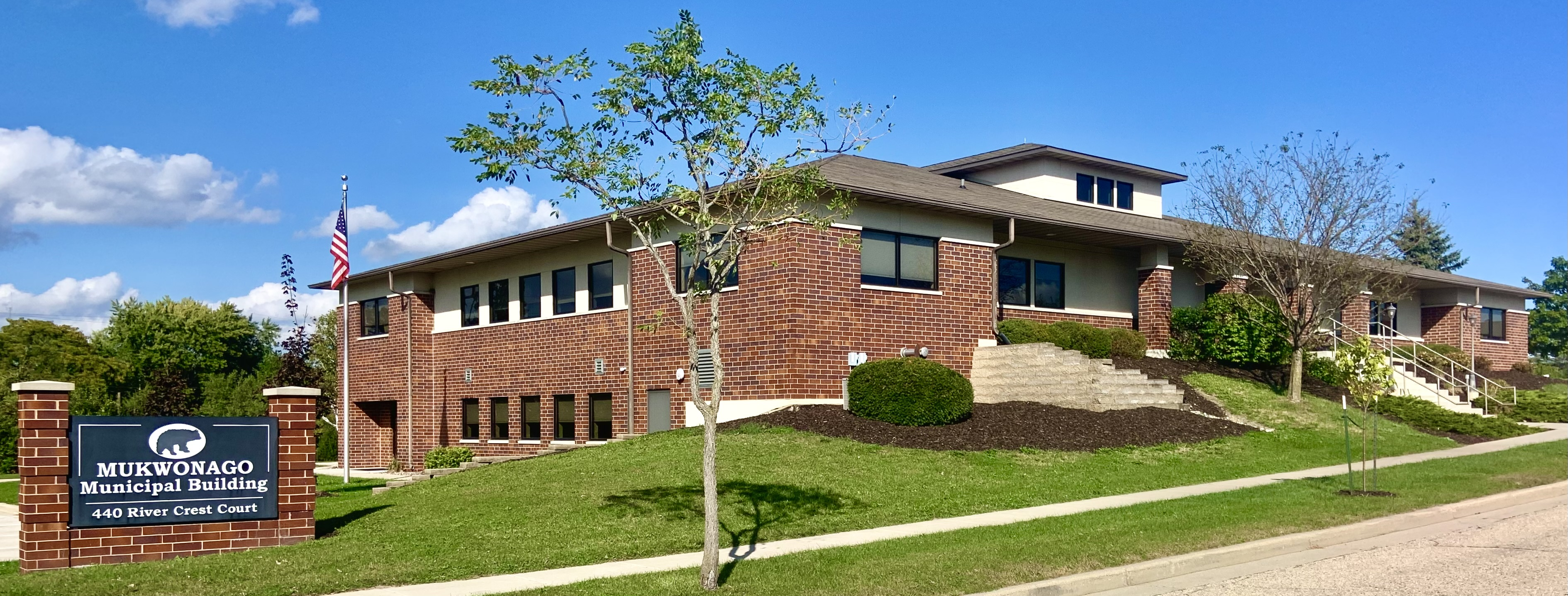
- Village hall
- Nickname: "Place of the Bear"
- Location of Mukwonago in Waukesha and Walworth counties, Wisconsin

- Location within Wisconsin Location within the United States
- Coordinates: 42°53′8″N 88°22′5″W
- Country: United States
- State: Wisconsin
- County: Waukesha, Walworth

Area
  - Total: 8.22 sq mi (21.30 km^{2})
  - Land: 8.03 sq mi (20.79 km^{2})
  - Water: 0.20 sq mi (0.51 km^{2})
- Elevation: 978 ft (298 m)

Population (2020)
  - Total: 8,262
  - Density: 1,003.7/sq mi (387.54/km^{2})
- Time zone: UTC-6 (Central (CST))
  - Summer (DST): UTC-5 (CDT)
- ZIP Code: 53149
- Area code: 262
- FIPS code: 55-55075
- GNIS feature ID: 1570017
- Website: www.villageofmukwonago.gov

Mukwonago (/məˈkwɒnəɡoʊ/) is a village in Waukesha and Walworth counties in the U.S. state of Wisconsin. It is along the Mukwonago River and Lower Phantom Lake. The population was 8,262 at the 2020 census, of which 8,040 were in Waukesha County and 222 were in Walworth County. The village is located mostly within the Town of Mukwonago in Waukesha County, with a small portion extending into the Town of East Troy in Walworth County.

== History ==
The area was originally a Native American village and the tribal seat of the Bear Clan of the Potawatomi Indians. The name "Mukwonago" is derived from mequanego which translates to bear's den. The spelling "Mukwonago" was adopted in 1844 because of the similarity to nearby Mequon. Many of the streets and roads are named after the city's founders, such as Ira Blood, Major Jessie Meacham, Sewall Andrews, and Thomas Sugden.

== Geography ==
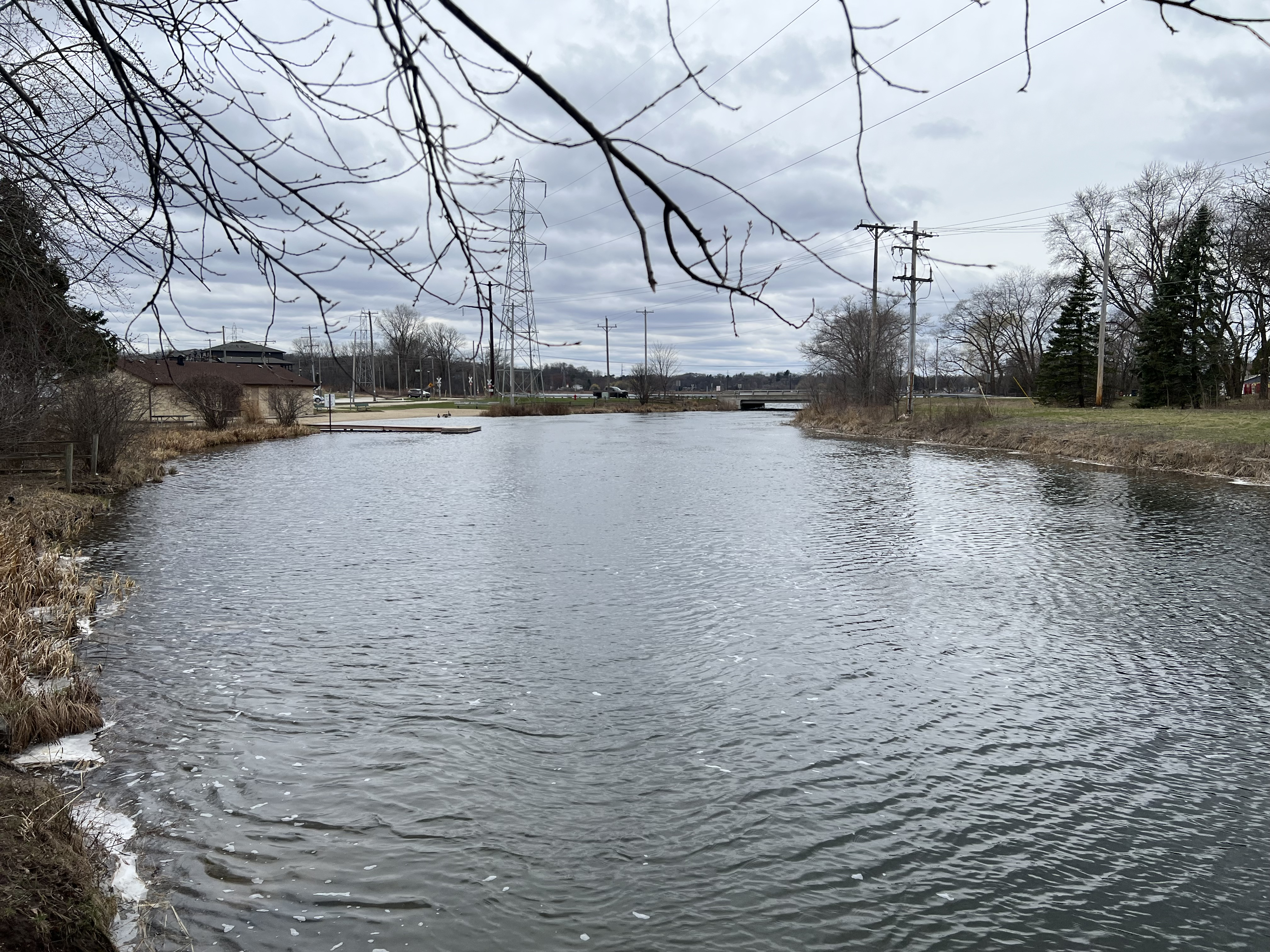
Mukwonago River

Mukwonago is located at 42°51′52″N 88°19′50″W (42.864557, −88.330619).

According to the United States Census Bureau, the village has a total area of 8.11 square miles (21.00 km^{2}), of which 7.90 square miles (20.46 km^{2}) is land and 0.21 square miles (0.54 km^{2}) is water.

Mukwonago is situated at the southwestern flank of the sprawling Vernon Marsh, and encircles Upper and Lower Phantom Lake(s). The lakes lie midway along the Mukwonago River from its source springs to its meeting with the Fox River, which travels further southeast through Big Bend and beyond. Upper (110 Acres) and Lower Phantom (373 Acres) Lakes are part of the Village of Mukwonago, managed by Phantom Lakes Management District (PhantomLakes.us).

=== Climate ===
Mukwonago has a hot summer and a cold winter (Köppen classification) humid continental climate.

Climate data for Mukwonago, Wisconsin (all records)
Month	Jan	Feb	Mar	Apr	May	Jun	Jul	Aug	Sep	Oct	Nov	Dec	Year
Record high °F (°C)	58 (14)	66 (19)	82 (28)	91 (33)	93 (34)	100 (38)	109 (43)	101 (38)	101 (38)	88 (31)	77 (25)	68 (20)	109 (43)
Mean daily maximum °F (°C)	28 (−2)	32 (0)	43 (6)	56 (13)	68 (20)	78 (26)	82 (28)	80 (27)	73 (23)	60 (16)	45 (7)	32 (0)	56 (14)
Source: https://www.weather.com/weather/wxclimatology/monthly/graph/53149

== Demographics ==
Historical population
Census	Pop.	Note	%±
1880	239		—
1890	356		49.0%
1910	615		—
1920	697		13.3%
1930	846		21.4%
1940	855		1.1%
1950	1,207		41.2%
1960	1,877		55.5%
1970	2,367		26.1%
1980	4,014		69.6%
1990	4,464		11.2%
2000	6,162		38.0%
2010	7,355		19.4%
2020	8,262		12.3%
U.S. Decennial Census

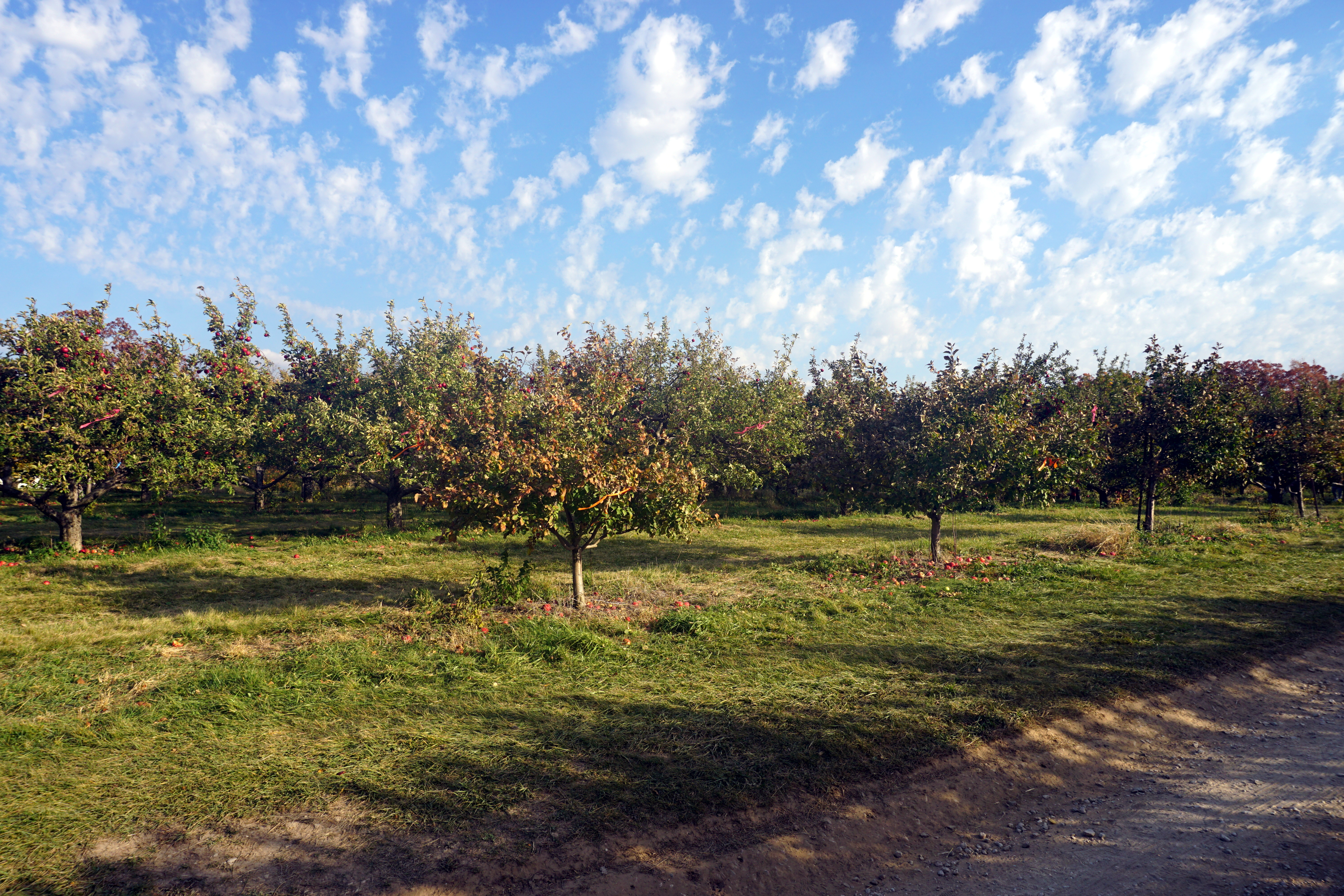
Apple orchard at the Elegant Farmer market

=== 2020 census ===
At the 2020 census there were 8,262 people, 3,126 households, and 2,021 families living in the village. The population density was 931.0 inhabitants per square mile (359.5/km^{2}). There were 3,474 housing units at an average density of 533.3 per square mile (206.0/km^{2}). The racial makeup of the village was 89.0% White, 0.1% African American, 0.4% American Indian and Alaska Native, 4.0% Asian, 0.0% Native Hawaiian and Pacific Islander, and 4.9% from two or more races. Hispanic or Latino people of any race were 7.0%.

Of the 3,126 households, 33.7% had children under the age of 18 living with them, 56.2% were married couples living together, 6.9% had a female householder with no spouse present, 1.5% had a male householder with no spouse present, and 35.3% were non-families. 29.1% of households were one person and 12.0% were one person aged 65 or older. The average household size was 2.59 and the average family size was 3.30.

The median age in the village was 40.3 years; 23.7% of residents were under the age of 18; 6.7% were between the ages of 18 and 24; 27.5% were from 25 to 44; 25.1% were from 45 to 64; and 17.0% were 65 or older. The gender makeup of the village was 48.9% male and 51.1% female.

=== 2010 census ===
At the 2010 census there were 7,355 people, 2,923 households, and 2,003 families living in the village. The population density was 931.0 inhabitants per square mile (359.5/km^{2}). There were 3,104 housing units at an average density of 392.9 per square mile (151.7/km^{2}). The racial makeup of the village was 97.4% White, 0.2% African American, 0.2% Native American, 0.9% Asian, 0.1% Pacific Islander, 0.3% from other races, and 0.9% from two or more races. Hispanic or Latino people of any race were 3.2%.

Of the 2,923 households 35.6% had children under the age of 18 living with them, 54.9% were married couples living together, 8.6% had a female householder with no husband present, 5.1% had a male householder with no wife present, and 31.5% were non-families. 26.6% of households were one person and 10.7% were one person aged 65 or older. The average household size was 2.50 and the average family size was 3.05.

The median age in the village was 37.9 years. 26.2% of residents were under the age of 18; 7.2% were between the ages of 18 and 24; 28.1% were from 25 to 44; 26.2% were from 45 to 64; and 12.4% were 65 or older. The gender makeup of the village was 48.9% male and 51.1% female.

== Education ==
The public schools serving Mukwonago are Mukwonago High School, Park View Middle School, Rolling Hills Elementary, Section Elementary, Big Bend Elementary, Eagleville Elementary, Prairie View Elementary, Clarendon Avenue Elementary, and Norris Academy.

Private schools include Mukwonago Baptist Academy, and St. John's Lutheran School.

== Notable people ==
- John M. Barlow, politician and businessman
- Anna Blount, physician
- Joseph Bond, politician
- Marvin H. Bovee, politician
- Matthias J. Bovee, politician
- Eugene W. Chafin, politician and writer
- Dave Considine, politician
- Timothy T. Cronin, attorney and politician
- Glenn Robert Davis, politician
- Charles De Garmo, teacher
- James H. Elmore, politician
- Cody Horlacher, politician
- Mary Beth Iagorashvili, Olympic pentathlete, 2000 & 2004 Summer Games
- Angie Jakusz, contestant on Survivor: Palau
- Scott Jensen, politician
- Charles Judd, politician
- Henry G. Klinefelter, politician
- Mark Lambrecht, winner of the fifth season of The Mole
- Lucius W. Nieman, founder of The Milwaukee Journal
- Nick Pearson, Olympic speedskater 2002 & 2010 Winter Games
- George Augustus Ray, politician
- Nik Rettinger, politician
- Brad Schimel, politician and lawyer
- Paul Stender, vehicle expert
- Thomas Sugden, politician
- Eric Szmanda, actor, CSI
- Fred Thomas, MLB player for the Boston Red Sox
- John J. Van Buren, United States Navy
- A.J. Vukovich, pro baseball player in the Arizona Diamondbacks organization
- Cadwallader Jackson Wiltse, politician
- Laurel E. Youmans, politician
