= Little Lambs, Inc. =

Christian prison ministry

Little Lambs, Incorporated, is a non-denominational Christian prison ministry based in Sebring, Florida. Its address is 710 S. Eucalyptus Street, in Sebring. Little Lambs was founded in 1984 by John Sala. It is run by John and his wife, Eileen. John Sala served time in prison and became a Christian. His experiences are detailed in the book The John Sala Story. He decided to devote his life to teaching the Bible to those incarcerated in jails and prisons.

Little Lambs runs two distinct programs and is in the process of adding a third program. The first established was its prison ministry. Its website explains its goal, "Our vision is to lead these damaged and lost [prisoners] to a new and better life through salvation, repentance, and mentoring." Also, the website says, "We are devoted to sharing the Gospel of Jesus Christ with the men and women in the prisons and jails across America." An educational course administered by Little Lambs reaches inmates in 783 jails and prisons in the United States, Canada and Barbados. As of 2010 2,309 male and female inmates were taking the Little Lambs Bible Disciple Training Course. Program graduates number many thousands. The course curriculum is 500 pages long. The organization works with prison chaplains, especially in Florida, to get the Salas face-to-face with prisoners to do a more effective job of ministry.

The second program is a twenty-four-week addiction recovery program taught at the Little Lambs office in Sebring. The program is open to Christians and non-Christians. It is based on a Christian twelve-step model.

The third program is Grace Place. Grace Place is a building at 543 Magnolia Street, Sebring, that is in the process of being remodeled (as of April 2011). It was acquired in 2010. Grace Place, according to the Little Lambs website, will be a recovery center for women in need. When completed, Grace Place will have room to house up to ten women. It will also have office and conference facilities.

Little Lambs is listed on the International Network of Prison Ministries website. This website provides contact information about Little Lambs and tells what it does.
