= Rose quartz =

Pink variety of quartz

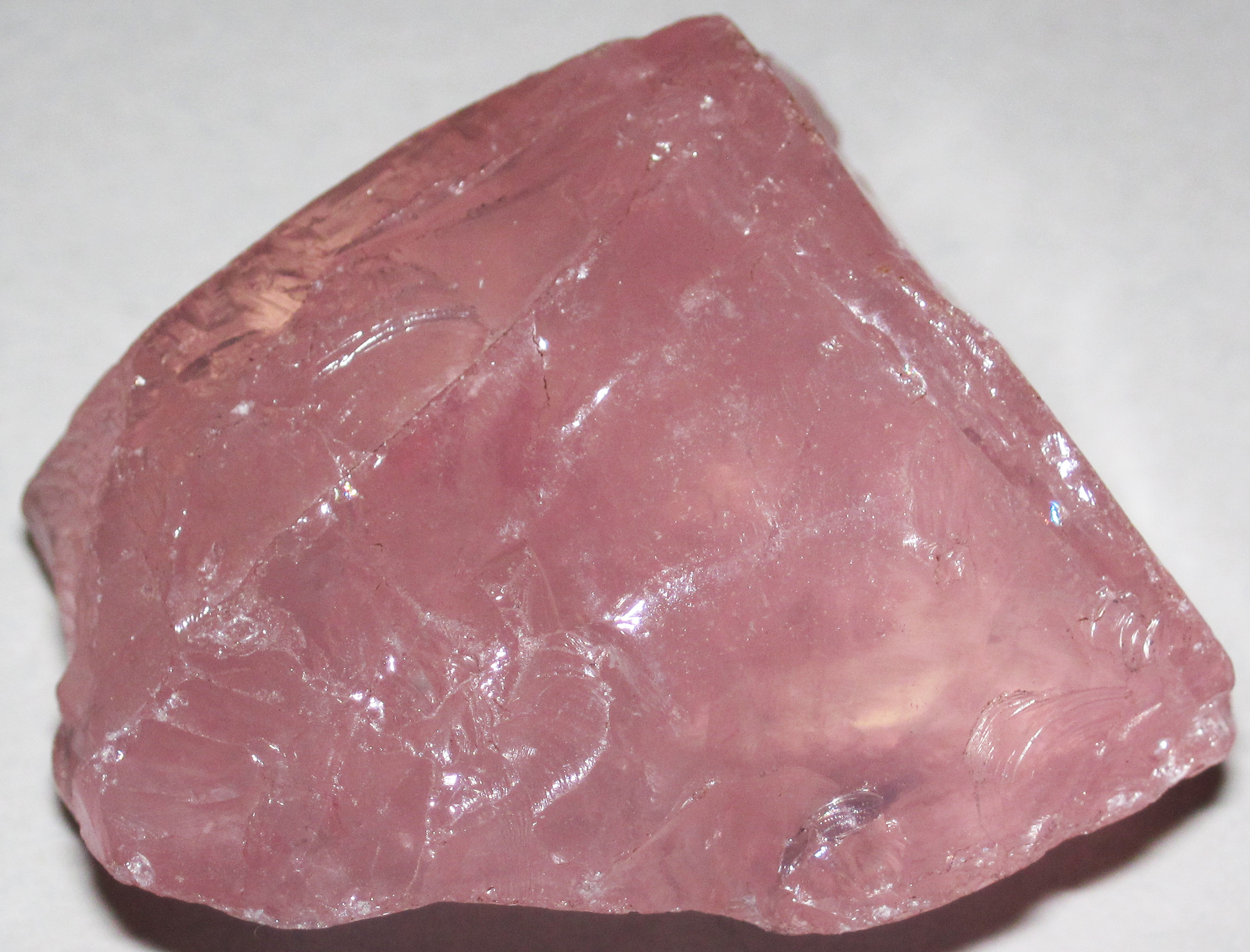
- Rose quartz

General
- Category: Tectosilicate minerals
- Group: Quartz group
- Formula: Silica (silicon dioxide, SiO_{2})
- IMA symbol: Qz
- IMA status: Variety of quartz
- Strunz classification: 4.DA.05 (Oxides)
- Dana classification: 75.1.3.1 (Tectosilicates)
- Crystal system: Trigonal
- Crystal class: Trapezohedral (class 3 2)

Identification
- Color: Light pink, rose
- Crystal habit: Massive (rose quartz); hexagonal (pink quartz)
- Cleavage: None
- Fracture: Conchoidal
- Tenacity: Brittle
- Mohs scale hardness: 7
- Luster: Vitreous
- Streak: White
- Diaphaneity: Translucent (rose quartz); transparent (pink quartz)
- Specific gravity: 2.65
- Optical properties: Uniaxial (+)
- Refractive index: 1.544-1.553
- Birefringence: 0.009
- Pleochroism: Dichroic (rose quartz); none (pink quartz)
- Dispersion: 0.013
- Common impurities: Fibrous mineral related to dumortierite (rose quartz); aluminium and phosphorus (pink quartz)

Rose quartz is a pink, translucent variety of quartz with a massive habit. Its color is due to microscopic inclusions of a fibrous silicate mineral related to dumortierite. Previously, the color was believed to be due to inclusions of rutile. Rose quartz is dichroic and may display asterism when cut into spheres or cabochons. It formed at very high temperatures of 400–700 °C (752–1,292 °F) in the quartz cores of pegmatites. Rose quartz is commonly used in lapidary for carvings and as a semiprecious gemstone.

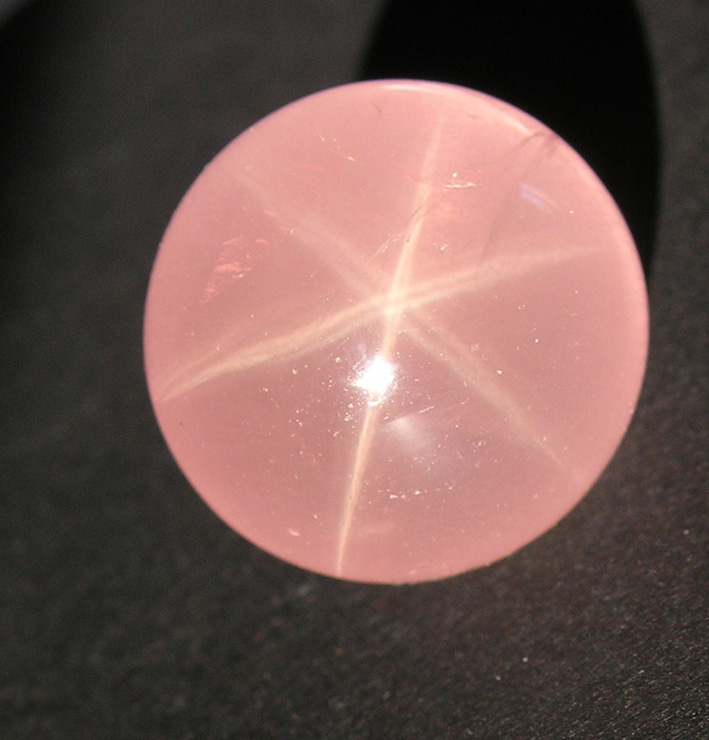
Rose quartz sphere displaying asterism

Rose quartz is always anhedral and does not occur as well-formed crystals. However, there is a distinct variety of pink-colored quartz called euhedral rose quartz or pink quartz that occurs as well-formed crystals. This variety derives its color from the presence of aluminium and phosphorus color centers in the crystal structure activated by natural irradiation. Unlike massive rose quartz, pink quartz is photosensitive and subject to fading. Pink quartz crystals are transparent and formed as late-stage hydrothermal deposits within pegmatite pockets.

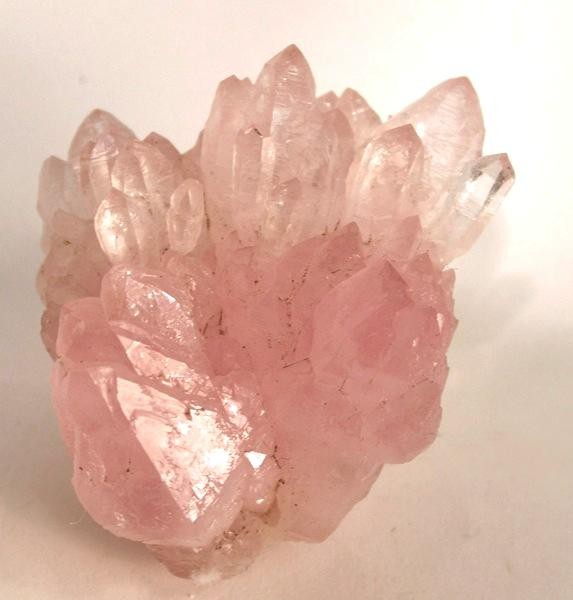
Pink quartz cluster from Minas Gerais, Brazil
