= Thomas Weaver =

Thomas or Tom Weaver may refer to:

- Thomas Weaver (geologist)
- Thomas Weaver (politician)
- Thomas Weaver (painter)
- Tom Weaver (rugby league))
- Tom Weaver (Neighbours)
