= Murph the Surf (film) =

1975 film by Marvin J. Chomsky

- Directed by: Marvin J. Chomsky
- Starring: Robert Conrad
- Music by: Phillip Lambro
- Production company: American International Pictures
- Distributed by: American International Pictures
- Release date: April 21, 1976
- Running time: 101 mins.
- Country: United States
- Language: English

Murph the Surf, also known as Live a Little, Steal a Lot, is a 1975 film based on a jewel burglary involving the surfer Jack Roland Murphy, who had the nickname "Murph the Surf". Starring Robert Conrad, Don Stroud and Donna Mills, it was directed by Marvin J. Chomsky. The New York Times edition of October 20, 2019, revisited the true story of Jack Murphy's theft of the irreplaceable gemstones from a poorly guarded Museum of Natural History.

== Plot ==
Based on a true story, details the daring 1964 theft of the J.P. Morgan jewel collection from New York's American Museum of Natural History. Called the "Greatest Jewel Heist of the 20th Century," the robbers took 22 precious gems, including the Star of India (a 563.35-carat sapphire), the 100.32-carat de Long Ruby and the 16.25-carat Eagle Diamond (which was never recovered) ... stones so famous they would be impossible to sell.

== Cast ==
- Robert Conrad as Allan Kuhn
- Don Stroud as Jack Murphy
- Donna Mills as Ginny Eaton
- Robyn Millan as Sharon Kagel
- Luther Adler as Max The Eye
- Paul Stewart as Avery
- Morgan Paull as Arnie Holcomb
- Ben Frank as Hopper Magee
- Burt Young as Sgt. Bernasconi
- Pepper Martin as Sgt. Terwilliger
- Randee Lynne Jensen as Girl at party
- Jess Barker as Museum Guard
