= Laurel E. Youmans =

American politician

Laurel Elmer Youmans (1863-1926) was a member of the Wisconsin State Assembly.

== Biography ==
Youmans was a native of Mukwonago, Wisconsin. He graduated from what is now the University of Wisconsin-Madison and became a physician. His son John B. Youmans (1893-1979) was a notable nutritionist.

== Career ==
Youmans was a member of the Assembly in 1911. He was a Republican.
