= Mukwonago River =

River in Wisconsin

Coordinates: 42°52′06″N 88°17′59″W

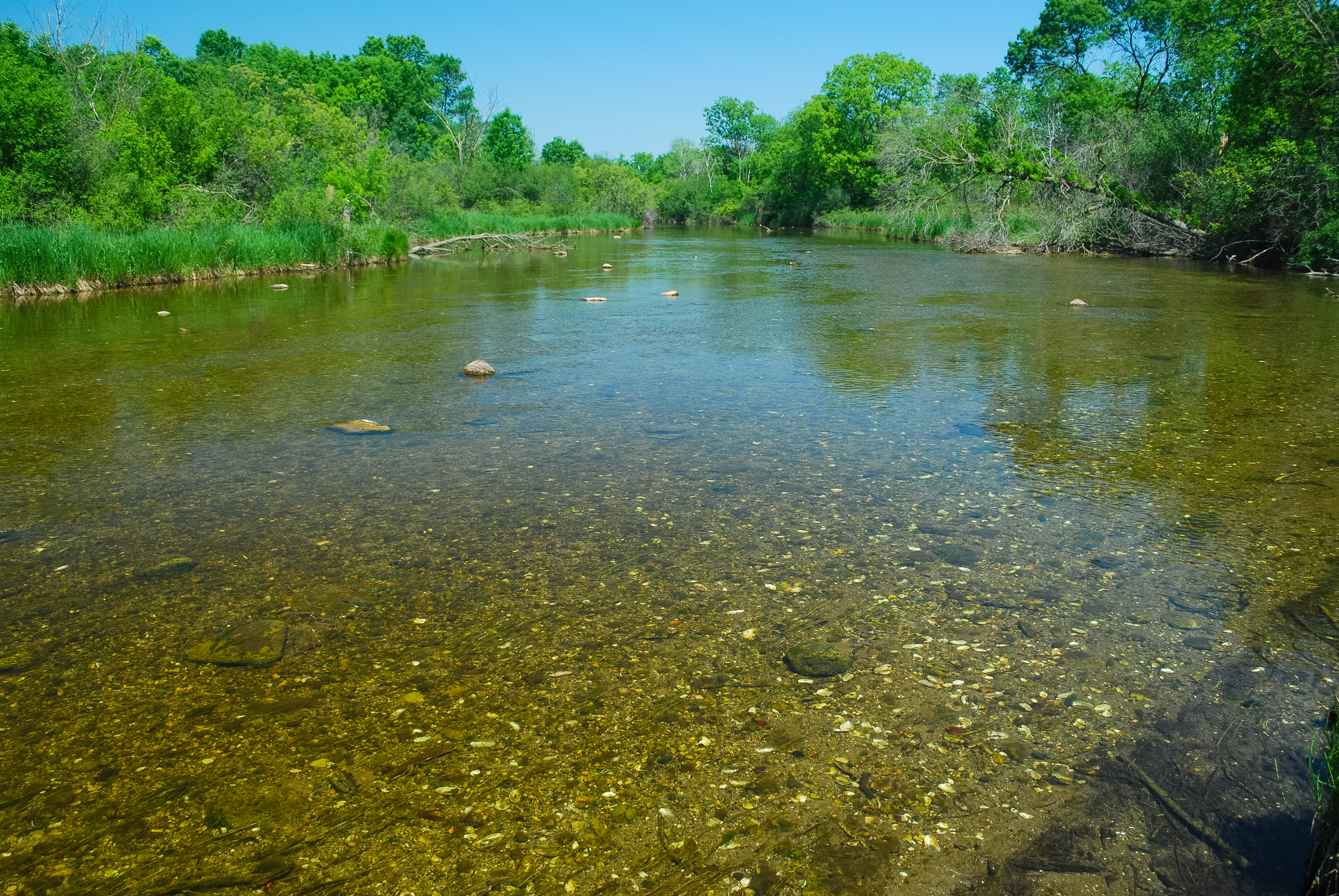
Mukwonago River

The Mukwonago River is one of the cleanest and most biologically diverse streams in southeastern Wisconsin. The river is part of the Mukwonago River Watershed which spans 47,500 acres through and around the town of Mukwonago.

== Fish and Wildlife ==
At least 53 species of fish, including two state listed species, and sixteen species of mussels are found in the Mukwonago River. Ten of the eleven Sunfish found in Wisconsin are present in the river including the threatened Northern Sunfish. All three species of Killifish (Topminnows), including the endangered Starhead Topminnow, can be found. In addition, the river is also home to a high biodiversity of waterfowl, reptiles, amphibians, insects, aquatic plants, and other wetland life. It holds one of the last and largest strands of wild rice in Southeastern Wisconsin. This high level of biodiversity is quite uncommon for a stream of this size and is only comparable to large rivers in Wisconsin like the Mississippi River or Wisconsin River.

== Conservation ==
Some of the invasive species that have been introduced to the watershed are the Asiatic Clam (Corbicula fluminea), Zebra Mussel (Dreissena polymorpha), Purple loosestrife (Lythrum salicaria), Eurasian Water-milfoil (Myriophyllum spicatum), and Curly-leaf pondweed (Potamogeton crispus).
