= Richard Weaver (American politician) =

American politician (1827–1906)

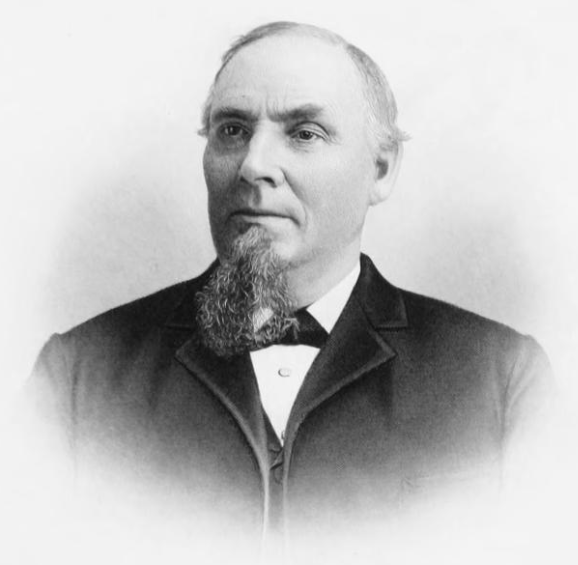

Member of the Wisconsin State Senate
- In office 1879–1880
- Constituency: 10th District

Member of the Wisconsin State Assembly
- In office 1878

Personal details
- Born: August 25, 1827 Sussex, England
- Died: December 26, 1906 (aged 79) Sussex, Wisconsin, US
- Resting place: St. Alban's Episcopal Church Cemetery, Sussex, Wisconsin
- Party: Democratic
- Spouse: Rhoda Stone (m. 1848)
- Children: 2
- Parents: James Weaver (father); Elizabeth Fielder (mother)
- Relatives: Thomas Weaver (brother)
- Occupation: Banker, politician

Richard Weaver (1827–1906) was a member of the Wisconsin State Assembly and the Wisconsin State Senate.

== Biography ==
Weaver was born on August 25, 1827, in Sussex, England. He moved to Oneida County, New York before settling in what is now Lisbon, Waukesha County, Wisconsin in 1837. On November 22, 1848, Weaver married Rhoda Stone. They would have two daughters.

Weaver died at his home in Sussex, Wisconsin on December 26, 1906. He was buried at St. Alban's Episcopal Church Cemetery in Sussex.

His father, James Weaver, and brother, Thomas Weaver, were also members of the Assembly.

== Legislative career ==
Weaver was a member of the Assembly during the 1878 session before representing the 10th District in the Senate during the 1880 and 1881 sessions. He was a Democrat.
