= Jack Roland Murphy =

American burglar (1937–2020)

Jack Roland Murphy (May 26, 1937 – September 12, 2020), known as "Murph the Surf" or "Murf the Surf", was an American burglar, athlete, minister, and convicted murderer. He was involved in the biggest jewel heist in American history, the 1964 burglary of the jewel collection of New York's American Museum of Natural History. Murphy is also known for being a surfing champion, musician, author, and artist.

He was released from prison in 1986. He spent his latter years as an ordained minister, working with inmates in the field of prison ministry.

== Early life ==
Murphy was born in Los Angeles. He was an only child and his father worked as a telephone company lineman. As a child, Murphy enjoyed the violin and surfing. He spent some of his formative years in a disciplinarian household in Carlsbad, California, an oceanfront city near San Diego. The Murphys also lived in Los Alamos, New Mexico, and Modesto, California, before moving to the Pittsburgh suburb of McKeesport, Pennsylvania when he was a high school senior. According to Murphy, he played violin with the Pittsburgh Symphony Orchestra and won a tennis scholarship to the University of Pittsburgh.

In 1955 he moved to Miami where he worked at hotels. He married Gloria Sostoc in 1957. They had two children together before divorcing in 1962. He remarried and opened a surf shop in Indialantic, Florida.

== Burglary ==
On October 29, 1964, at New York's American Museum of Natural History Murphy was involved in the notorious burglary of 24 precious gems including the Star of India, the Eagle Diamond and the DeLong Star Ruby. This heist was called the "Jewel Heist of the Century." It targeted the museum's J.P. Morgan jewel collection.

Murphy had cased the museum earlier and discovered that security was lax to non-existent. The burglar alarm system was non-operational, and the hall's 19 exterior windows were left open two inches overnight for ventilation. The thieves climbed in through the window and discovered that the display case alarms were non-functional as well. The stolen jewels were reported as being worth more than $400,000 (equivalent to $4,152,361 in 2025), though museum officials indicated the loss was actually incalculable.

Murphy and both his accomplices, Alan Kuhn and Roger Clark, were arrested two days later after police had been tipped off by staff members at the Cambridge House hotel where the three men had been staying and throwing lavish parties. The men were charged with first degree burglary and possession of burglary tools. Free on bail, the men returned to Florida. Months later, prosecutors charged Murphy and Kuhn with the unrelated robbery and assault of actress Eva Gabor. In response to the new charges, a judge raised their bail to $150,000 and the men were jailed. Kuhn offered to retrieve the jewels in exchange for a lighter sentence.

The uninsured Star of India was recovered from a locker at a Miami bus station. Most of the other gems were also recovered, except the Eagle Diamond, which has since been hypothesized to have been cut down into smaller stones. Richard Duncan Pearson was also convicted for his participation in the ransom scheme.

In April 1965, Murphy, Kuhn and Clark pleaded guilty to burglary and grand larceny and were sentenced to three years.

Writer Nora Ephron, then only 23, covered the story for the New York Post. The heist was the subject of the film Murph the Surf (1975), directed by Marvin Chomsky, and starring Robert Conrad, Don Stroud (as Murphy), and Donna Mills. The plot of the 1972 film The Hot Rock, based on a novel by Donald Westlake and starring Robert Redford, George Segal, Zero Mostel, and Moses Gunn, features a jewel theft from a museum that strongly resembles the actual crime.

== Whiskey Creek murders and other crimes ==
In 1967, in Broward County, Florida, the weighted-down bodies of Terry Rae Frank and Annelle Marie Mohn were found in Whiskey Creek Canal, near Hollywood, at the site of John U. Lloyd Beach State Park. The two women were former employees of the Los Angeles brokerage firm Rutner, Jackson & Gray. They were suspects in the theft of $488,732 worth of stocks (equivalent to approximately $4,719,044 in 2025 dollars). The loss of the stocks was not discovered until after the two women quit the firm and moved to Florida. Shortly after arriving in Florida, Frank and Mohn moved in with Murphy.

In 1968, Murphy was the getaway driver in the robbery of socialite Olive Wofford.

In 1969, Murphy and an accomplice, Jack Griffith, were tried in Fort Lauderdale for the murder of 24-year-old Terry Rae Frank, one of the two women. Murphy's attorney pleaded not guilty of first-degree murder by reason of insanity. Murphy was committed to a mental hospital for several months before the judge ruled that he was fit to stand trial. In March 1969, he was sentenced to life in prison with hard labor. Griffith was convicted of second-degree murder, and received a 45-year sentence with hard labor.

Murphy subsequently was convicted in the Wofford robbery. He was sentenced to a second life sentence plus 20 years.

== Parole ==
Bill Glass, Roger Staubach, and McCoy McLemore, world champion athletes and local businessmen, visited the Florida State prison in 1974. Murphy was impressed by these visitors and decided to change his life. At that time, Murphy's earliest parole date was November 2005. Murphy began participating in the prison chaplaincy program, leading Bible studies, and mentoring other men in prison. His parole date was moved up progressively because of good behavior. The Florida Parole Board voted to release Murphy, effective November 1986. Some conditions of his parole included making a $2500 donation to Meals on Wheels, and a restriction on returning to Dade and Broward counties, where the crimes were committed.

== Life after prison ==
In 1986, Murphy began visiting prisons and jails all over the U.S. as a part of his prison ministry. He was hired by Bill Glass Champions for Life in 1986. Murphy was also a featured speaker for Kairos Prison Ministry, Coalition of Prison Evangelists, International Network of Prison Ministries, Time for Freedom, and Good News Jail & Prison Ministry. After visiting over 1,200 prisons, and recognizing the change apparent in Murphy's life, the Florida Parole Board terminated his "lifetime parole" in 2000.

Murphy was the keynote speaker in Jerusalem during the 1st World Conference on Crime Prevention and Rehabilitation through Religion. He was a frequent guest on Christian television and radio programs. Murphy also appeared on CNN's Larry King Live.

Murphy served as a vice-president of International Network of Prison Ministries, visiting prisons, jails, and youth detention facilities all over the world.

Murphy wrote a book about his experience and testimony entitled Jewels for the Journey.

He carried campaign signs for Bernie Decastro for sheriff in 2012.

Jack Roland Murphy lived in Crystal River, Florida, with his wife, Kitten, and grandchildren.

In 2012, Murphy's bid for clemency was denied by the state of Florida. Former Florida Department of Corrections Secretary Louie L. Wainwright spoke on Murphy's behalf about the prison ministry work he had done since his 1986 release from prison. According to reports, Governor Rick Scott was personally willing to restore Murphy's rights, but did not have the additional two votes from cabinet members required under Florida law.

Murphy has been featured in the following films:

- Murph the Surf (1975)
- Great Crimes and Trials of the Twentieth Century - Murf the Surf: The Boston Brink's Robbery (1992)
- Do's and Don'ts of Prison Ministry (2008)

In a 2019 New York Times feature story on the 1964 jewel heist, Murphy, the only survivor among the robbers, was quoted at length from his home in Florida.

Murphy wrote the foreword to the book, “Once Life Matters: A New Beginning” written by Marty Angelo.

Murphy died on September 12, 2020, in Crystal River Florida. According to his wife he died of heart and organ failure.
