= Joseph Bond =

American pioneer and politician (1800–1884)

Member of the Wisconsin State Assembly
- In office January 1, 1855 – January 7, 1856
- Preceded by: Edward Lees
- Succeeded by: John James
- Constituency: Waukesha 3rd district
- In office June 5, 1848 – January 1, 1849
- Preceded by: Position established
- Succeeded by: Thomas Sugden
- Constituency: Waukesha 5th district

Personal details
- Born: October 10, 1800 Thurman's Patent, New York, U.S.
- Died: January 26, 1884 Waukesha County, Wisconsin, U.S.
- Resting place: Oak Knoll Cemetery, Mukwonago, Wisconsin
- Party: Democratic

Joseph Bond (October 10, 1800 – January 26, 1884) was a pioneer settler of what became Waukesha County in Wisconsin Territory, and an active Democratic politician, serving in the territorial legislature and later in the Wisconsin State Assembly as well as holding local offices.

== Background ==
Bond was born on October 10, 1800, in Thurman's Patent (now Warrensburg), New York, their eleventh and last child (his mother was over 50 years old). His parents were Quakers who had come to New York from England as children in the 1760s. He dropped out of school before his 12th birthday. He became a farmer in East Hamburg, New York, and prospered sufficiently that he was able to sell his farm at a profit before coming to Mukwonago, Wisconsin Territory in June 1839, and buy a farm of 280 acres soon after his advent. Long-time friend Andrew E. Elmore described Bond at their first meeting that year thus, the brawny, erect figure of what I thought was the tallest man I ever had seen... taking the ax, attacked the stump in scientific backwoods style, with astonishing strength... (Bond stood six foot four inches tall.)

== Legislative career ==
Bond was a Democrat, boasting of having voted for Andrew Jackson in 1828. At the time of his first arrival, Mukwonago was part of Milwaukee County, and he served several years as a county supervisor for that area. He served as one of the members of the Territorial House of Representatives from the district including his area for the first (1840–41) and second (1841–42) sessions of the Third Legislative Assembly.

A mass meeting was held at Waukesha (then called Prairieville) late in 1845, to discuss the idea dividing the county, at which Bond presided. A committee was chosen to pick a name for the new entity, and Bond (known as an admirer and advocate of Native American names) made two suggestions of names from the Potawatomi language, one of which (Wauk-tsha or Wauk-shah, meaning "fox") was adopted, although in the process of committee deliberation and legislative haggling, the forms Bond suggested were discarded in favor of "Waukesha", a three-syllable word with no meaning in Potawatomi. Bond himself was known to them as Netch ("Open Hand", because he gave them tobacco), or Wau-bus-kee (which means "white").

In April 1846, a referendum did lead to the splitting-off of what became Waukesha County from the eastern remainder of Milwaukee County, and Bond was one of the county supervisors chosen to organize the new county government. He remained as a supervisor for the 1847 term as well.

Upon Wisconsin achieving statehood, Bond was elected for Waukesha County's 5th State Assembly district (towns of Genesee, Delafield and Pewaukee) for the 1st Wisconsin Legislature in 1848. He was succeeded for the next term by Thomas Sugden, a Whig. He was elected once more to the 8th Wisconsin Legislature of 1855, succeeding Whig Chauncey Purple in what was now the 2nd Waukesha County district. He would be succeeded by fellow Democrat James Weaver.

In 1861, Bond was nominated for the Wisconsin State Senate, but withdrew, choosing instead to support the Republican candidate, John Hodgson.

Bond died on January 26, 1884, and was buried in Waukesha, Wisconsin. Bond had ordered his own coffin in advance, with simple iron handles prepared by the local blacksmith; and at Bond's request, Elmore was the sole speaker at the funeral.
