= James Weaver (Wisconsin politician) =

Politician

James Weaver was a member of the Wisconsin State Assembly.

== Biography ==
Weaver was born on October 17, 1800, in Kent, England. He moved to Oneida County, New York, in 1830 before eventually settling in Lisbon, Waukesha County, Wisconsin.

In 1820, Weaver had married Elizabeth Fielder. Among their children were Thomas Weaver, a member of the Assembly, and Richard Weaver, a member of the Assembly and of the Wisconsin State Senate. The elder Weaver died on October 8, 1886.

== Assembly career ==
Weaver was a member of the Assembly in 1856, succeeding Joseph Bond. Like Bond, Weaver was a Democrat.
