= Eagle, Wisconsin =

- Village
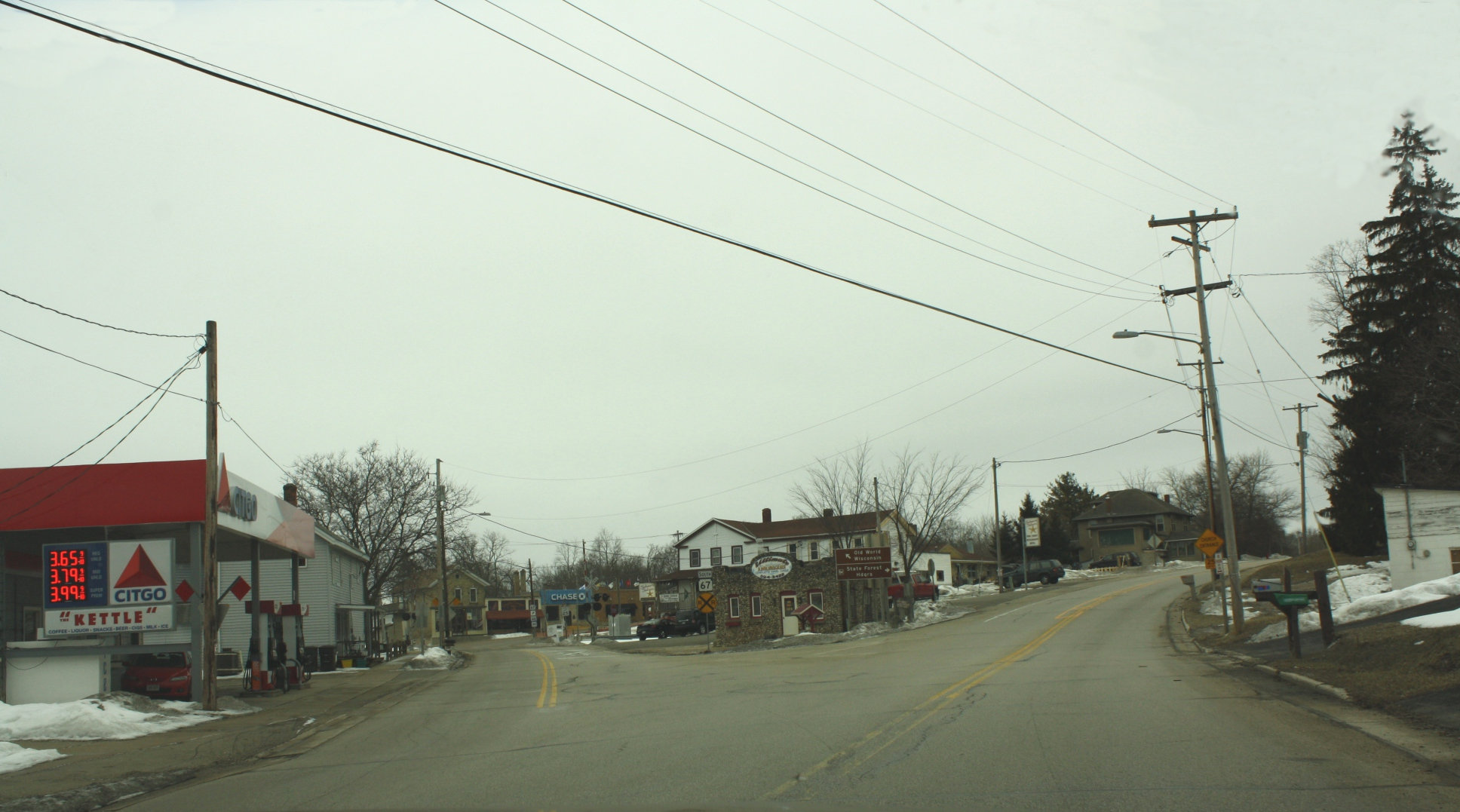
- Looking south in downtown Eagle

- Location of Eagle in Waukesha County, Wisconsin.
- Coordinates: 42°52′39″N 88°28′18″W
- Country: United States
- State: Wisconsin
- County: Waukesha

Area
  - Total: 1.39 sq mi (3.61 km^{2})
  - Land: 1.39 sq mi (3.60 km^{2})
  - Water: 0 sq mi (0.00 km^{2})
- Elevation: 902 ft (275 m)

Population (2020)
  - Total: 2,071
  - Density: 1,552.1/sq mi (599.26/km^{2})
- Time zone: UTC-6 (Central (CST))
  - Summer (DST): UTC-5 (CDT)
- Postal code: 53119
- Area code: 262
- FIPS code: 55-21450
- GNIS feature ID: 1583112
- Website: Village of Eagle

Eagle is a village in Waukesha County, Wisconsin, United States. At the 2020 census, the population was 2,071. The village is located within the Town of Eagle.

== History ==
The town's name comes from an 1836 incident when pioneer Thomas Sugden and two companions, exploring the area, spotted what was described as "a monster bald-headed eagle... hovering and curving over a large mound" in the midst of the prairie. Eagle was the site where the Eagle Diamond was found in 1876.

The village was struck by an EF2 tornado on the night of June 21, 2010. Tornado alert sirens in the area failed to sound prior to the strike. There were no fatalities, but there were several minor injuries. At least 2 homes were leveled to the ground by the tornado and several other homes had major damage.

== Geography ==
Eagle is located at 42°52′39″N 88°28′18″W (42.877595, -88.471918).

According to the United States Census Bureau, the village has a total area of 1.33 square miles (3.44 km^{2}), all land.

== Demographics ==
Historical population
Census	Pop.	Note	%±
1880	292		—
1900	324		—
1910	339		4.6%
1920	394		16.2%
1930	392		−0.5%
1940	391		−0.3%
1950	460		17.6%
1960	620		34.8%
1970	745		20.2%
1980	1,008		35.3%
1990	1,182		17.3%
2000	1,707		44.4%
2010	1,950		14.2%
2020	2,071		6.2%
U.S. Decennial Census

=== 2020 Census ===
As of the census of 2020, there were 2071 people, 799 households, and 767 families living in the village. The median age in Eagle was 41. The racial makeup was 92.99% White, 0.5% Native American, 0.38% Asian, 0.43% African American, 0.53% from other races, 5.12% were two or more. Hispanic or Latino of any race were 3.62% of the population.

The Median household income was $109,545 compared to the median household income in the state of $74,631. Families had a median income of $116,094. 72.5% of the population was employed at the time of the census.

27% of the population had a bachelor's degree or higher. 35.6% had a high school or equivalent degree.

=== 2010 Census ===
As of the census of 2010, there were 1,950 people, 684 households, and 536 families living in the village. The population density was 1,466.2 inhabitants per square mile (566.1/km^{2}). There were 704 housing units at an average density of 529.3 per square mile (204.4/km^{2}). The racial makeup of the village was 98.3% White, 0.1% African American, 0.1% Native American, 0.4% Asian, 1.0% from other races, and 0.2% from two or more races. Hispanic or Latino of any race were 2.1% of the population.

There were 684 households, of which 45.2% had children under the age of 18 living with them, 68.0% were married couples living together, 6.1% had a female householder with no husband present, 4.2% had a male householder with no wife present, and 21.6% were non-families. 18.1% of all households were made up of individuals, and 5.9% had someone living alone who was 65 years of age or older. The average household size was 2.85 and the average family size was 3.25.

The median age in the village was 35.3 years. 30.4% of residents were under the age of 18; 5.8% were between the ages of 18 and 24; 31.3% were from 25 to 44; 24.8% were from 45 to 64; and 7.6% were 65 years of age or older. The gender makeup of the village was 50.8% male and 49.2% female.

=== 2000 Census ===
As of the census of 2000, there were 1,707 people, 592 households, and 468 families living in the village. The population density was 1,346.5 people per square mile (519.0/km^{2}). There were 605 housing units at an average density of 477.2 per square mile (183.9/km^{2}). The racial makeup of the village was 96.49% White, 0.23% Black or African American, 0.53% Native American, 0.29% Asian, 1.35% from other races, and 1.11% from two or more races. 3.05% of the population were Hispanic or Latino of any race.

There were 592 households, out of which 46.5% had children under the age of 30 living with them, 71.3% were married couples living together, 4.6% had a female householder with no husband present, and 20.8% were non-families. 17.1% of all households were made up of individuals, and 6.8% had someone living alone who was 65 years of age or older. The average household size was 2.88 and the average family size was 3.28.

In the village, the population was spread out, with 31.6% under the age of 18, 6.2% from 18 to 24, 38.0% from 25 to 44, 17.6% from 45 to 64, and 6.6% who were 65 years of age or older. The median age was 33 years. For every 100 females, there were 98.7 males. For every 100 females age 18 and over, there were 97.1 males.

The median income for a household in the village was $58,207, and the median income for a family was $62,500. Males had a median income of $41,711 versus $27,500 for females. The per capita income for the village was $21,975. About 1.4% of families and 3.1% of the population were below the poverty line, including 4.3% of those under age 18 and 2.8% of those age 65 or over.

== Education ==
Eagle is part of the Palmyra-Eagle Area School District. The schools serving Eagle include Eagle Elementary School, Palmyra-Eagle Middle/High School. On July 1, 2019, the school board of the Palmyra-Eagle School District voted to dissolve the district. The district cited a lack of funding necessary to continue operations past the 2019–2020 school year. On January 16, 2020, the School District Boundary Appeal Board denied the dissolution in a 6-1 decision to keep the district open. In reaction the school district closed Palmyra Elementary School, and moved its students to Eagle Elementary School. New school board and community members disagree with the decision as many of the school district's financial problems remain unresolved.

The town is served by the "Alice Baker Memorial Public Library".

== Images ==
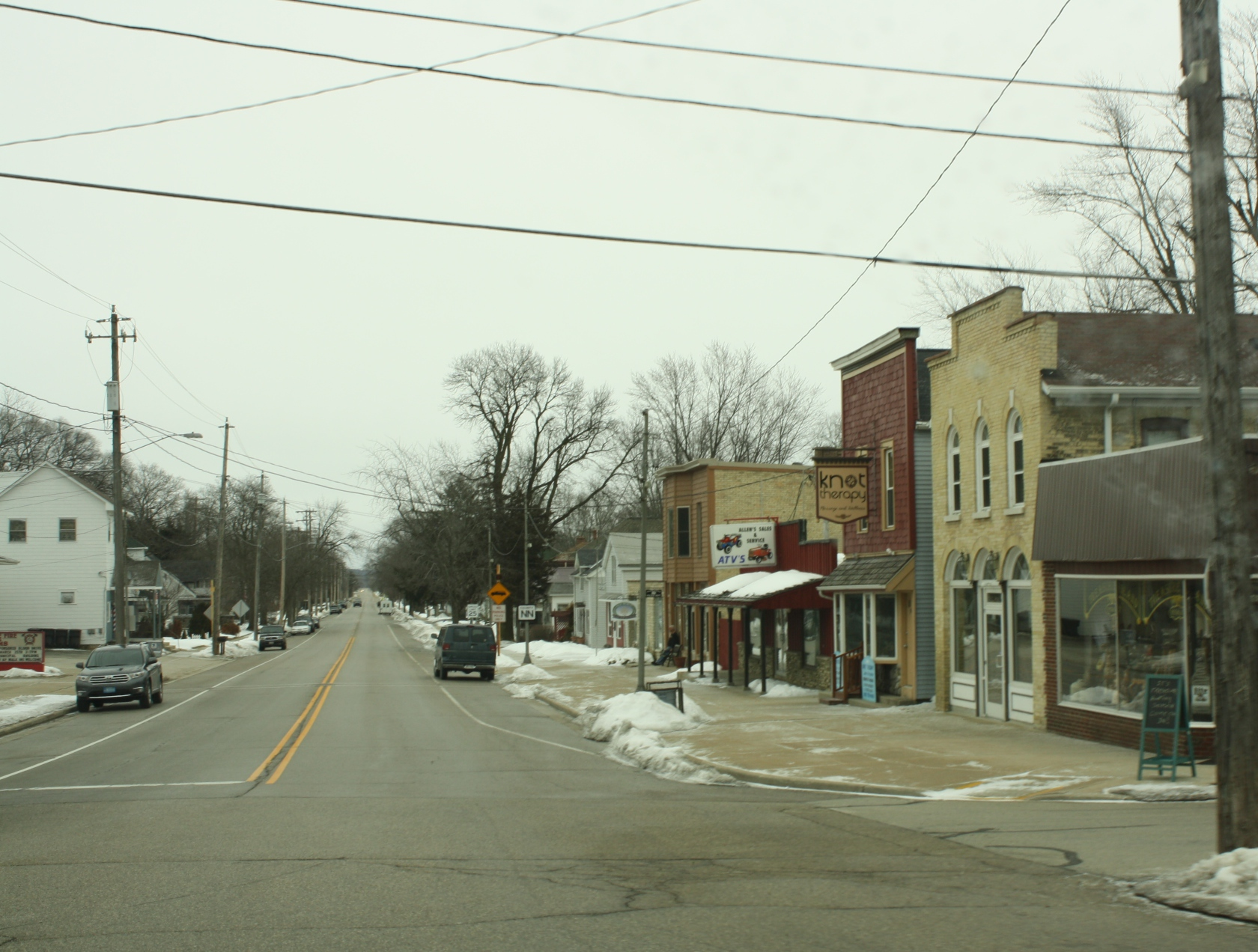
Looking east in downtown Eagle

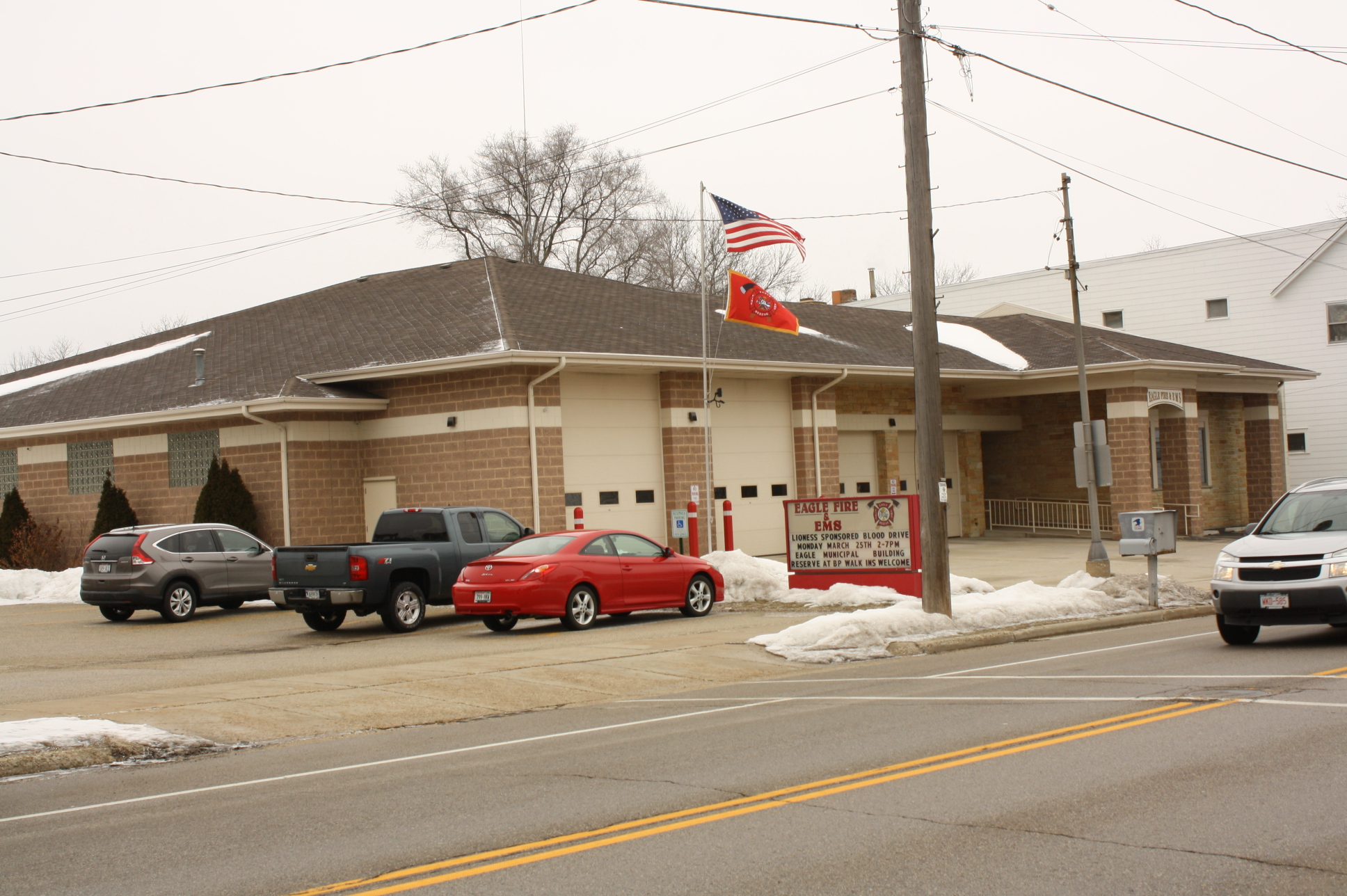
Fire station and EMS

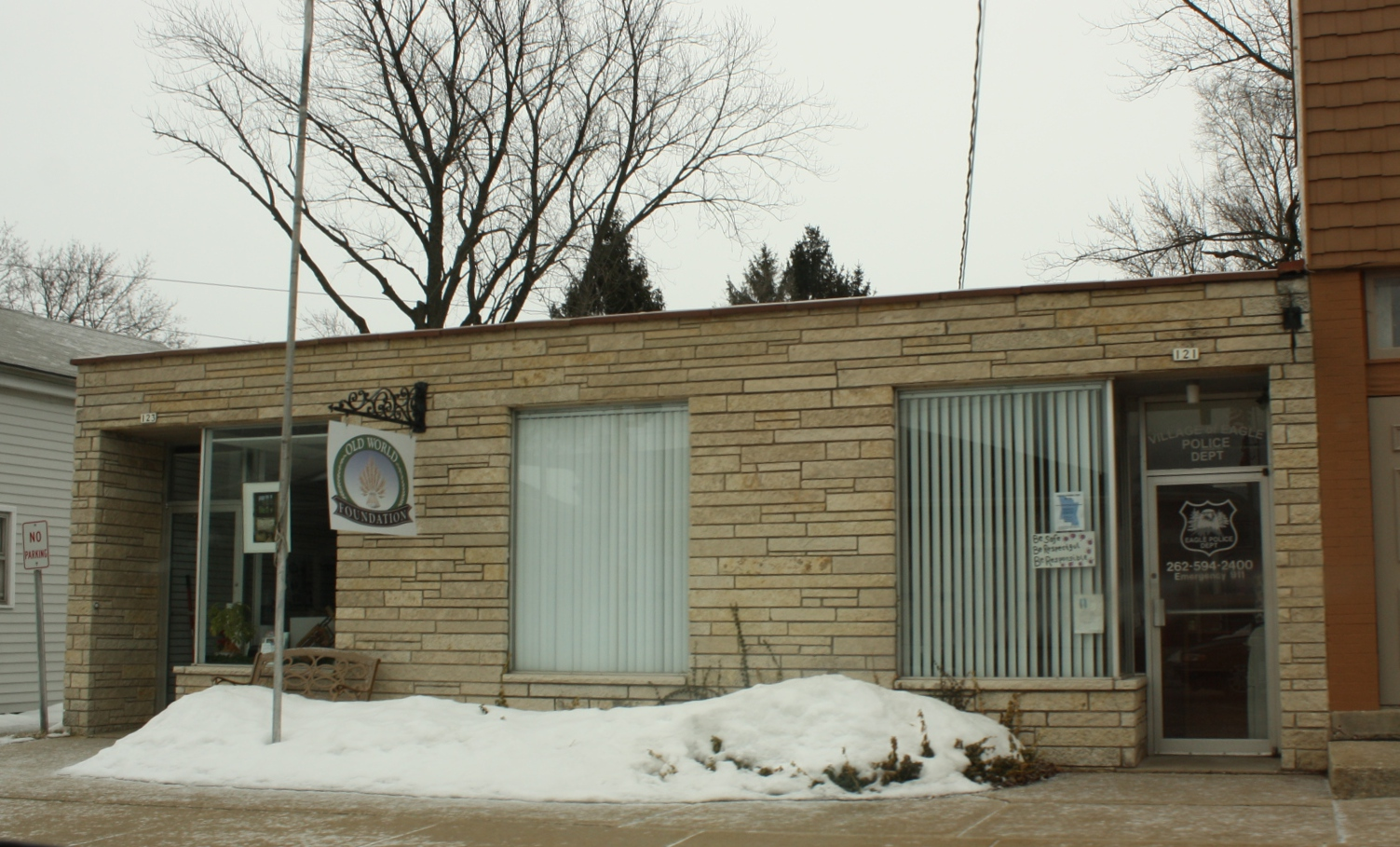
Police station

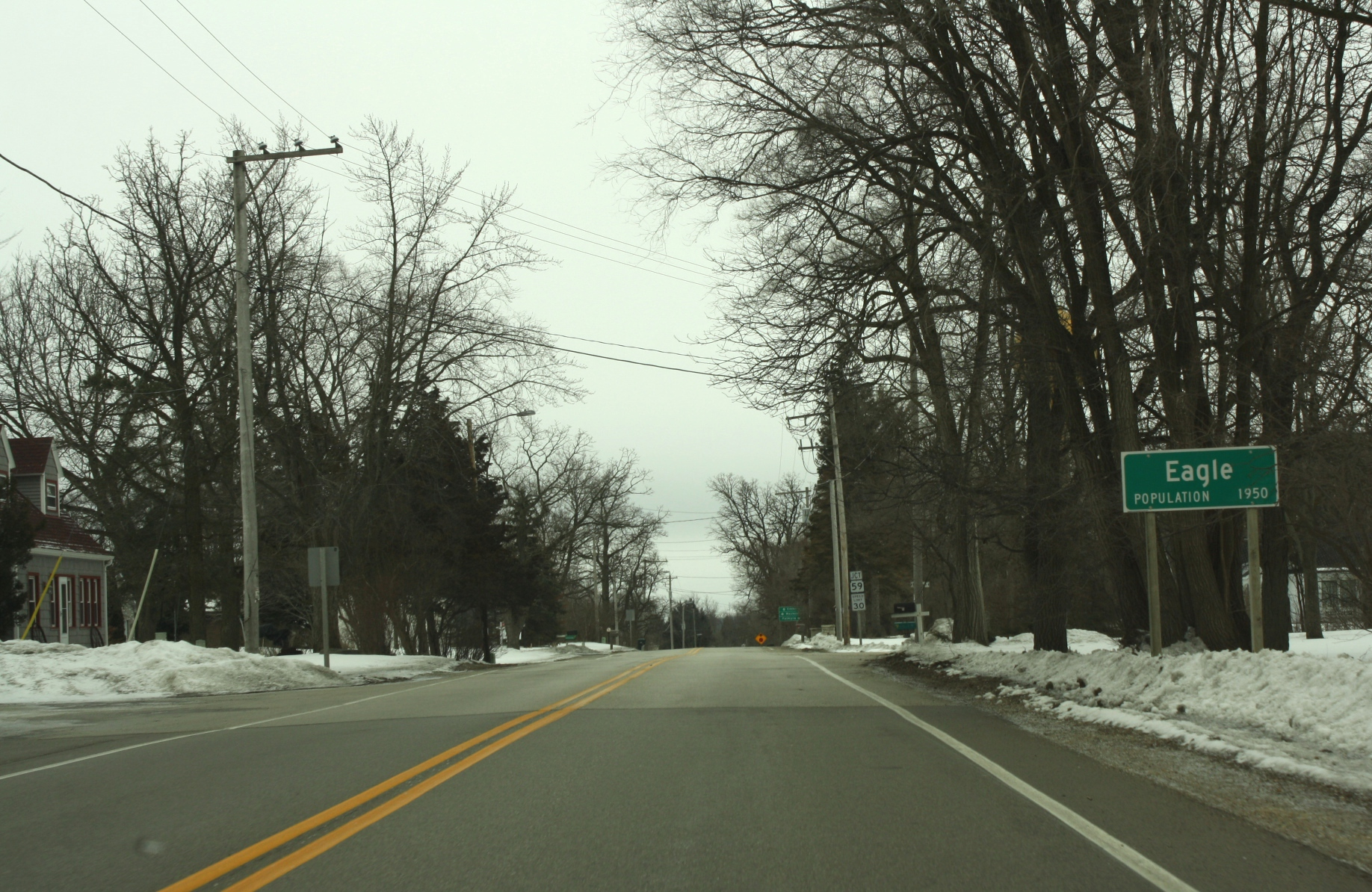
Sign for Eagle on WIS 67

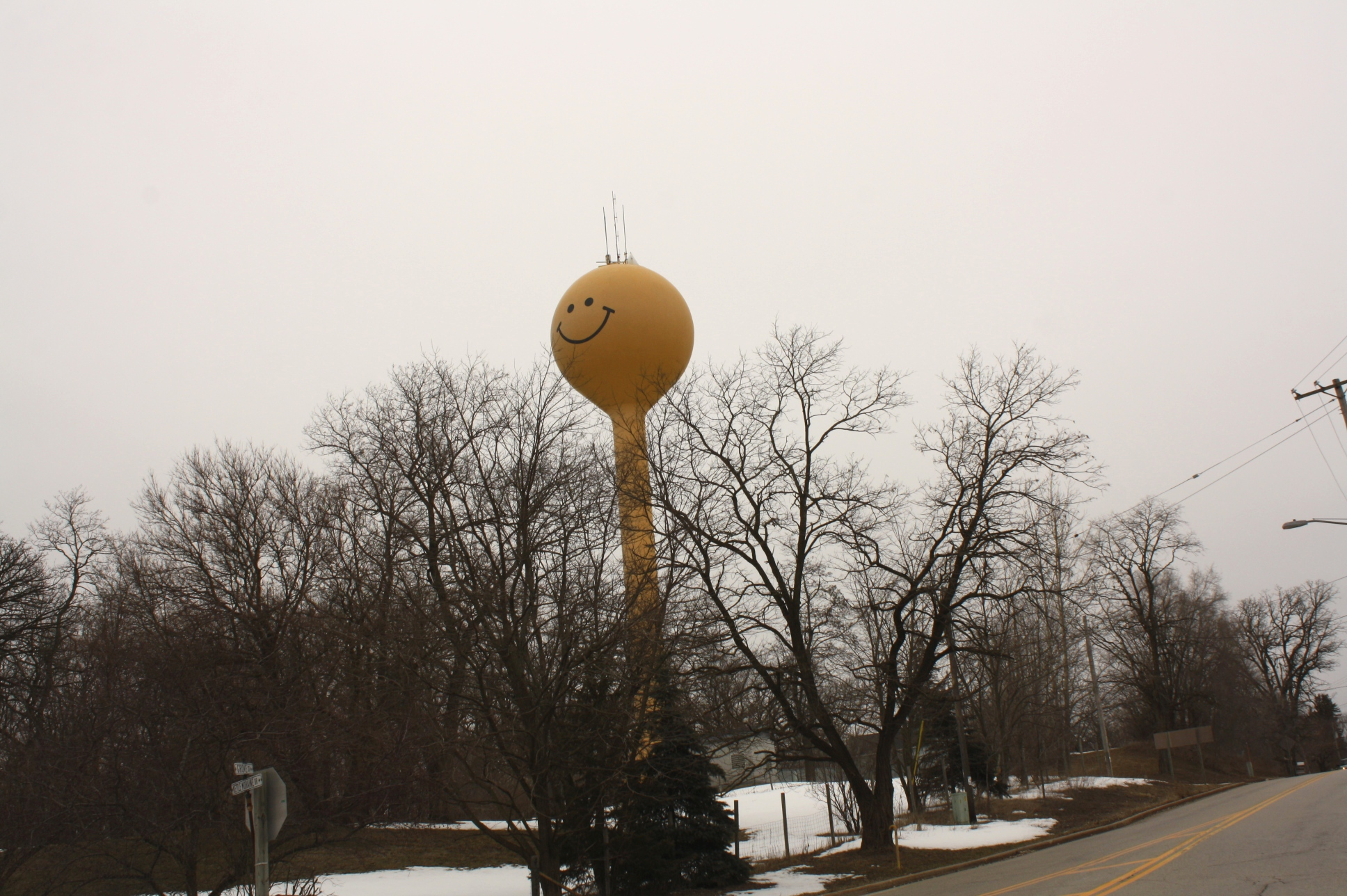
Smile on water tower

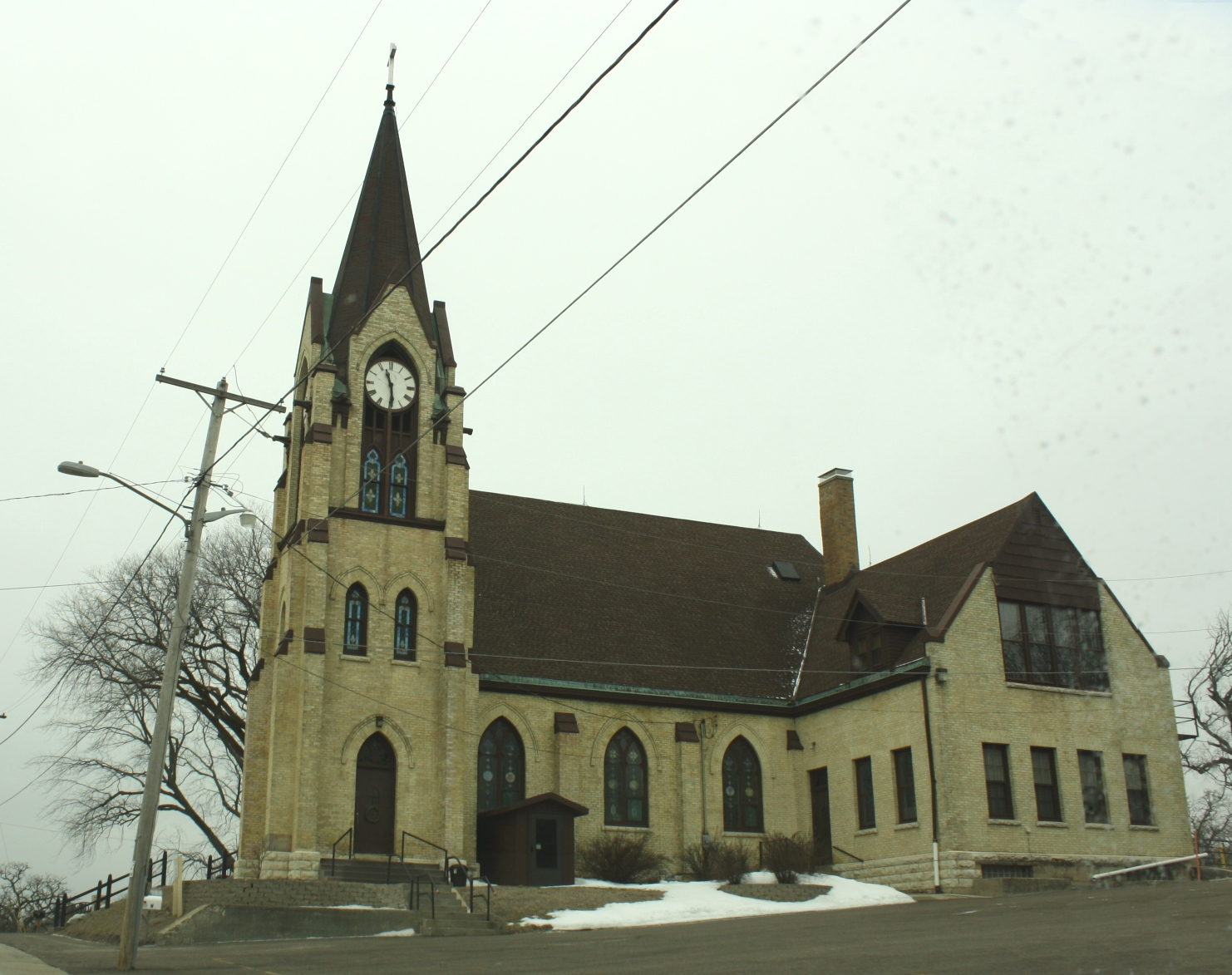
St. Theresa Catholic Church

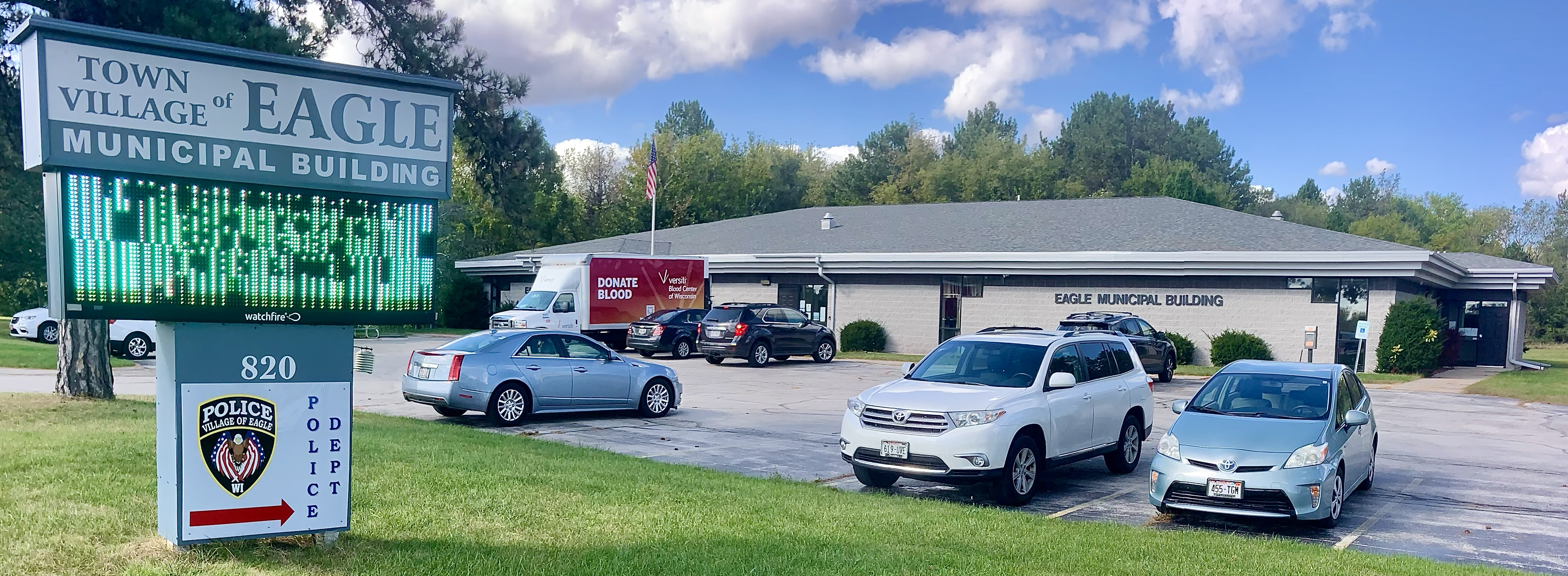
Eagle Town & Village Hall

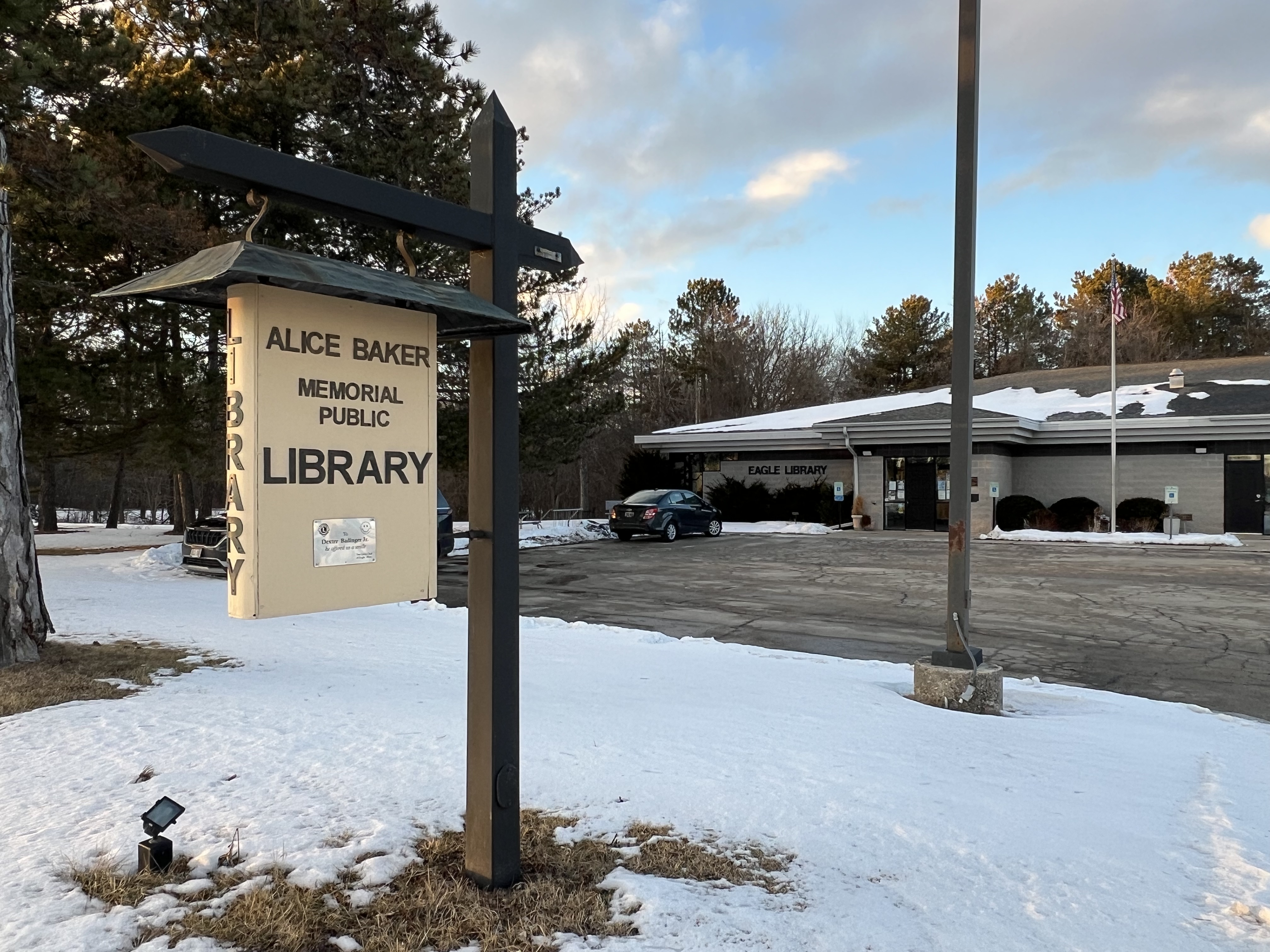
Alice Baker Memorial Public Library in 2026
