= DeLong Star Ruby =

100.32-carat star ruby

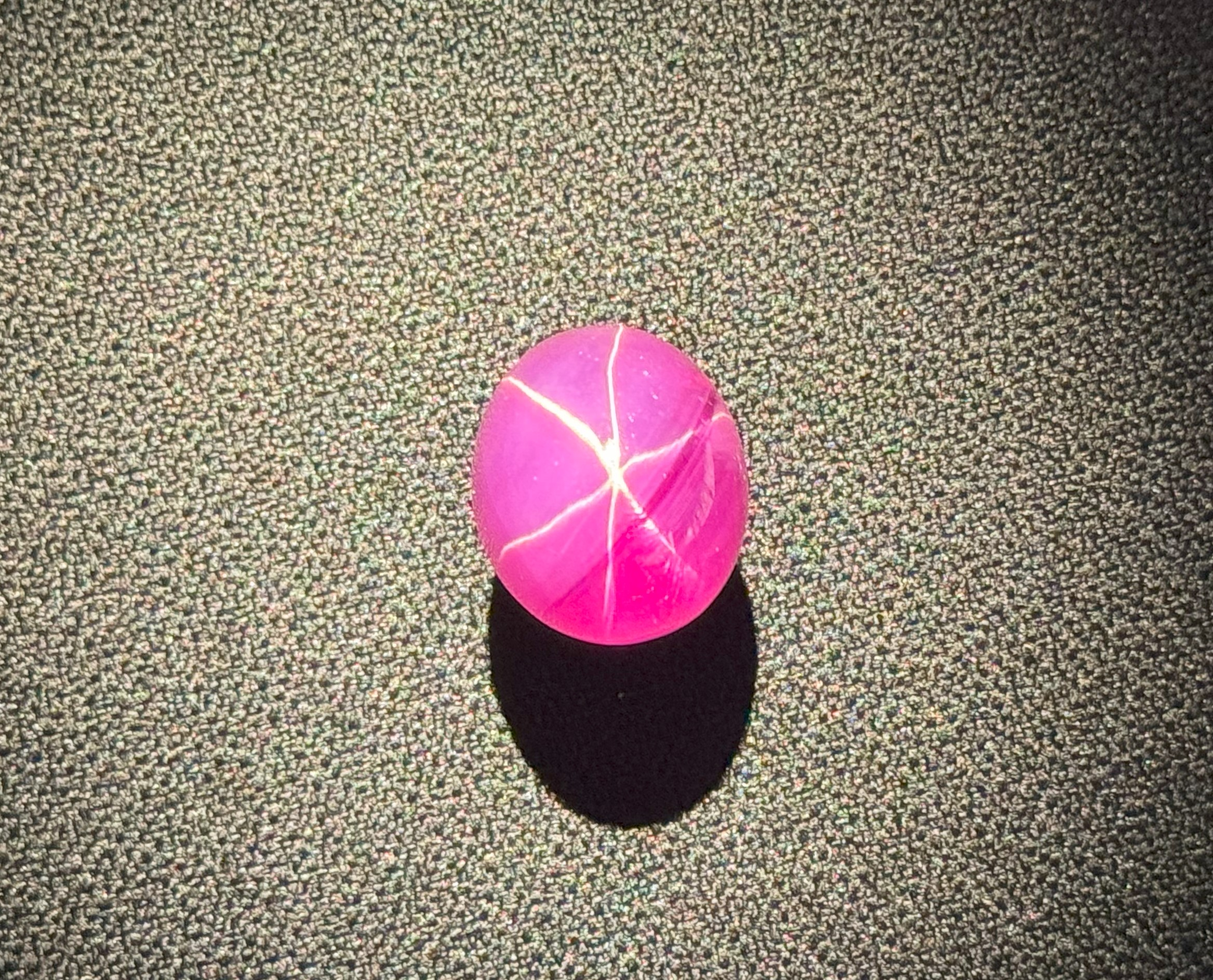
The Edith Haggin DeLong Star Ruby

The DeLong Star Ruby, a 100.32-carat (20.064 g) oval cabochon star ruby. Discovered in Burma in the 1930s, it was sold by Martin Ehrmann to Edith Haggin DeLong for US$21,400, who then donated it to the American Museum of Natural History in New York City in 1937.

== History ==
On October 29, 1964, the DeLong star ruby was one of a number of precious gems stolen in a notorious jewelry heist by Jack Roland Murphy and two accomplices. In January 1965, nine of the stolen gems, including the Star of India and the Midnight Star, were recovered in a bus depot locker; however, the DeLong ruby was not among them. After months of negotiation, the unknown holder of the ruby agreed, through third parties including Dick Pearson, to ransom it for $25,000. The ransom was paid by wealthy Florida businessman John D. MacArthur and he was present on September 2, 1965, when the ruby was recovered at the designated drop off site: a phone booth at a service plaza on the Sunshine State Parkway near Palm Beach, Florida. Months later Dick Pearson was arrested burglarizing a jewelry store in Georgia and was found in possession of $100 bills with serial numbers matching the ransom money. He was convicted and sentenced to 10 years in prison for his involvement in the DeLong Star ruby case.

== See also ==
- List of individual gemstones
- List of rubies by size
