= Thomas Weaver (politician) =

American politician

Thomas Weaver was a member of the Wisconsin State Assembly.

== Biography ==
Weaver was born on October 1, 1822, in Sussex, England. He moved with his family to Oneida County, New York in 1830 before eventually settling in Lisbon, Waukesha County, Wisconsin. Weaver's father, James Weaver, would become a member of the Assembly and his brother Richard Weaver, would become a member of the Assembly and of the Wisconsin State Senate.

On April 8, 1847, Weaver married Betty Craven. They would have thirteen children. Weaver died on July 25, 1885.

== Assembly career ==
Weaver was a member of the Assembly during the 1865 session. He was a Democrat.
