= Eagle Diamond =

Gemstone discovered in Eagle, Wisconsin in 1876

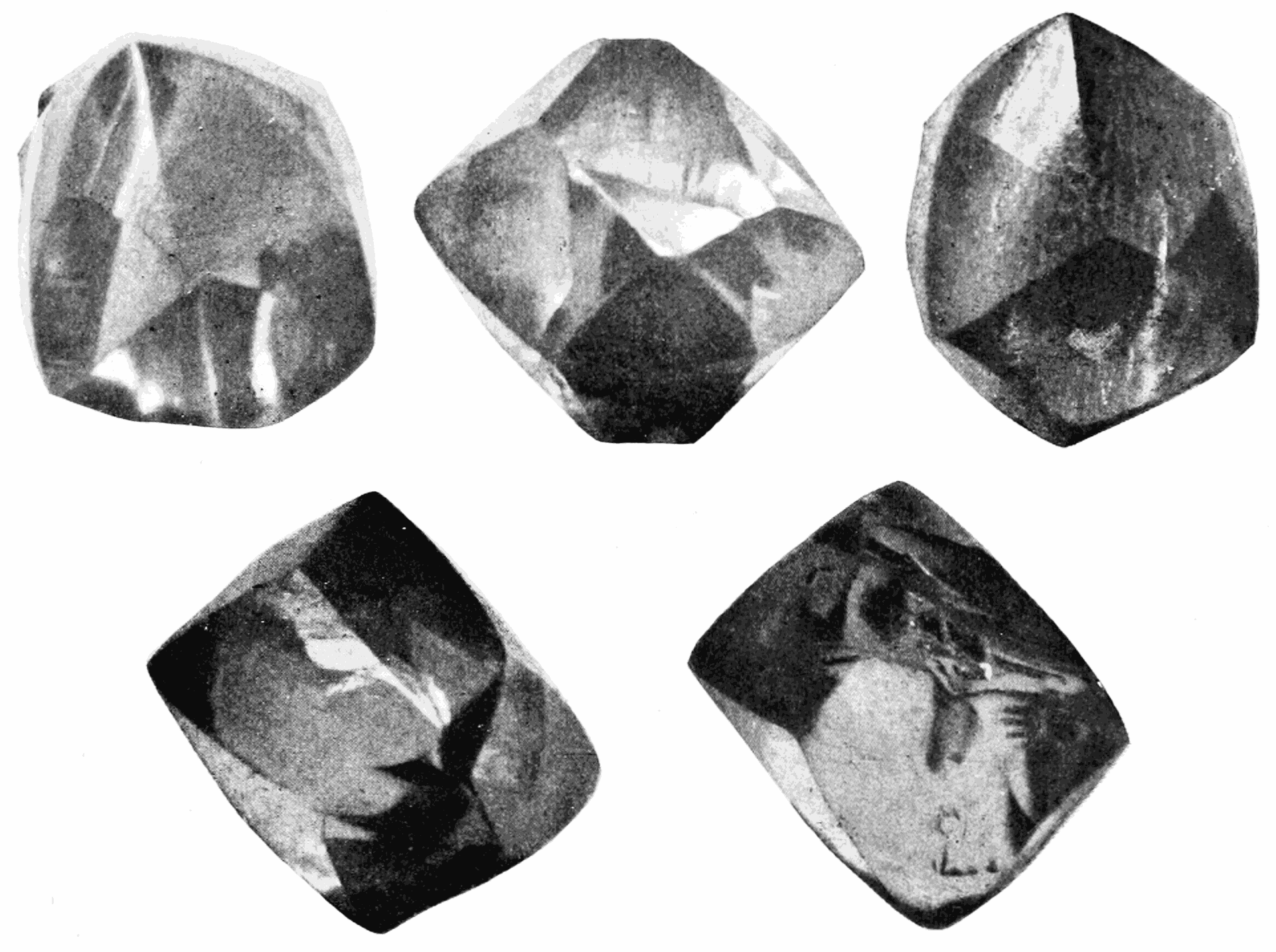
- Five views of the Eagle Diamond
- Type of stone: Diamond
- Weight: 16 carats (3.2 g)
- Country of origin: United States
- Mine of origin: Eagle, Wisconsin hillside
- Discovered: 1876

The Eagle Diamond is a gemstone discovered in Eagle, Wisconsin in 1876 that was about 16 carats. It was found on a hillside about 30 feet below the surface in glacial till while digging a well. It was one of more than a dozen rare gems stolen in a heist from the American Museum of Natural History in 1964 and remains missing to this day.

== History ==
The stone was originally discovered by workers hired by Thomas Devereaux of Eagle, Wisconsin to dig a well on the hill where the current water tower stands. It was described as being located under 25 feet of loose gravel, followed by four feet of clay, inside a six feet thick layer of yellow "matrix" consisting of gravel or clay cemented by oxide of iron. At that time, none knew it was in fact a valuable diamond. Eventually it came into the possession of Charles and Clarissa Wood, who were living on Devereaux's land as tenants.

According to court testimony provided by Ms. Wood, in September or October of 1883, she went to Samuel B. Boynton, a jeweler in Milwaukee, to have a pin mended. As she was paying for the repair, Wood asked Boynton what he thought of the stone. Wood told Boynton she had been told it was a topaz. Boynton, said it might be, and offered to buy it for one dollar. Wood declined Boynton's offer and left. About two months later, Wood, needing money, returned to Boynton's shop and sold it to him for the one dollar he had previously offered.

Boynton took the stone to Chicago to be appraised, where he discovered it was a diamond worth $700. When Wood learned of the appraisal, she attempted to buy the stone back from Boynton for one dollar, plus ten cents interest. When Boynton refused her offer, Wood sued unsuccessfully to have it returned to her in a case that was ultimately decided by the Wisconsin Supreme Court. Meanwhile, Boynton leased the area that the diamond was found and under the pretext of chicken farming he built privacy fences and mined the hillside for additional diamonds. After several years of fruitless digging, he spread inferior gems in the area to attract investors for his Eagle Diamond-Mining Company.

Eventually, Boynton sold the diamond to Tiffany's in New York City for $850 ($20,500 in 2020). George F. Kunz, gemologist for Tiffany and Co., assembled a large collections of gems for the 1889 Exposition Universelle with the help of Tiffany and Co. This collection was purchased by J.P. Morgan, and donated to the American Museum of Natural History. With Morgan's help a much larger collection was assembled for the 1900 exposition in Paris, which was also donated to the Museum; this second collection included the Eagle Diamond. It was displayed in the J.P. Morgan Memorial Hall along with the Star of India and the DeLong Star Ruby until October 29, 1964 when it was stolen, by Jack "Murph the Surf" Murphy and his two accomplices, Allen Kuhn and Roger Clark. The diamond has never been recovered and is thought to have been cut into smaller stones.

== See also ==
- List of diamonds
