= Thomas Sugden (footballer) =

English footballer

Personal information
- Place of birth: England
- Position: Goalkeeper

Senior career*
Years	Team	Apps	(Gls)
1901–1902	Burnley	7	(0)
Total		7	(0)
- * Club domestic league appearances and goals

Thomas Sugden was an English professional footballer who played as a goalkeeper. He played seven matches in the Football League for Burnley in the 1901–02 season.
