= Asterism (gemology) =

Star-shaped reflection

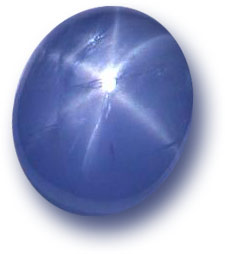
Asterism on the surface of a blue star sapphire.

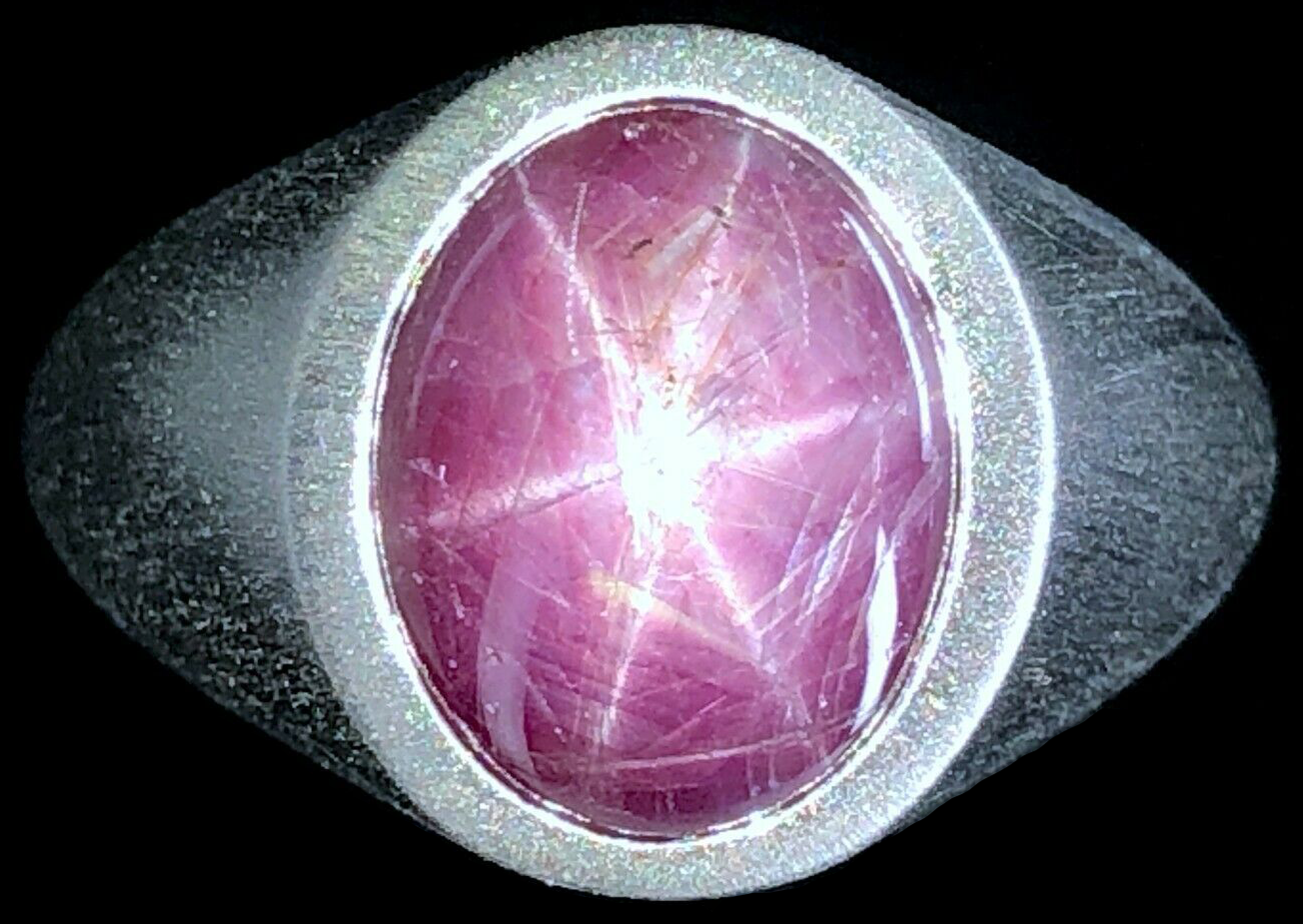
A purple-pink star sapphire displaying asterism in a platinum ring.

An asterism (from Ancient Greek ἀστήρ (astḗr) 'star' and -ism) is a star-shaped concentration of light reflected or refracted from a gemstone. It can appear when a suitable stone is cut en cabochon (i.e. shaped and polished, not faceted).

A gemstone that exhibits this effect is called a star stone or asteria. The best known is star sapphire, but many other minerals can also be asteria, usually due to impurities in the crystal structure.

== Archetype ==
The archetypal asteria is the star sapphire, generally corundum with near uniform impurities which is bluish-grey and milky or opalescent, which when lit has a star of six rays. In the red instance stellate reflection is rarer; the star-ruby occasionally found with the star-sapphire in Sri Lanka is among the most valued of "fancy stones". Other examples are star-topaz (8 rays) and star diopside (4 rays); star garnets may display four-rayed or six-rayed asterisms.

== Description ==
Asterism is generated by reflections of light from twin-lamellae or from extremely fine needle-shaped acicular inclusions within the stone's crystal structure. A common cause is oriented sub-microscopic crystals of rutile within the gem mineral.

It occurs in rubies, sapphires, garnet, diopside, and spinel when a cabochon is cut from a suitable stone. Star sapphires and rubies display the property from titanium dioxide impurities (rutile) present in them. The star-effect or "asterism" is caused by the difference in refractive index between the host material and that of the dense inclusions of tiny fibers of rutile (also known as "silk"). Rutile causes the relative bright relief of a star in a host material such as corundum, which has a refractive index between 1.760 and 1.778, much lower than that of rutile. The stars are caused by the light reflecting from needle-like inclusions of rutile aligned perpendicularly to the rays of the star. The star-effect may be also caused by the inclusions of hematite. In black star sapphire hematite needles formed parallel to the faces of the second order prism produce asterism. Some star sapphires from Thailand contain both hematite and rutile needles forming a 12-ray star.

Star-stones were formerly regarded with much superstition. Pliny the Elder's example is consistent with a moonstone; he described it as a colourless stone from India within which was the appearance of a star shining with the light of the moon. However, since rutile is present in most common star gemstones, these are almost never completely transparent.

A distinction can be made between two types of asterism:

- Epiasterism, such as that seen in sapphire and most other gems, is the result of a reflection of light on parallel arranged inclusions inside the gemstone.
- Diasterism, such as that seen in rose quartz, is the result of light transmitted through the stone. In order to see this effect, the stone must be illuminated from behind. Rose quartz also exhibits epiasterism.

== See also ==
- Gemology
- Isomorphism (crystallography)
- Chatoyancy
