= International Network of Prison Ministries =

The International Network of Prison Ministries (INPM) is a Dallas, Texas based crime prevention and rehabilitation trans-national organization.

== History ==
As of 2016 INPM listed over 4,600 prison ministries worldwide.

== Programs ==
INPM functions through a website that serves as a clearinghouse for information about various Christian prison ministries. This group provides information on Christian groups who are guided by the INPM's statement of faith: "Therefore if any man is in Christ, he is a new creature; the old things passed away...(2 Cor. 5:17)". Prison ministry groups are allowed to become members of the INPM and are provided web pages within the INPM website to present information about themselves. Searchable information on jails and prisons (mostly US) is provided.

This information is available to other ministries, those involved with the criminal justice system, and to the general public. The site contains a variety of different methods to conduct an online search within its database to allow for easy access to chaplains of jails and prisons and to relevant ministries.

Numerous websites provide endorsements of INPM. The Faith and Service Technical Education Network (FASTEN) provides an overview of INPM and approves of its work.
