= Thomas Sugden (farmer-politician) =

American politician (1810–1883)

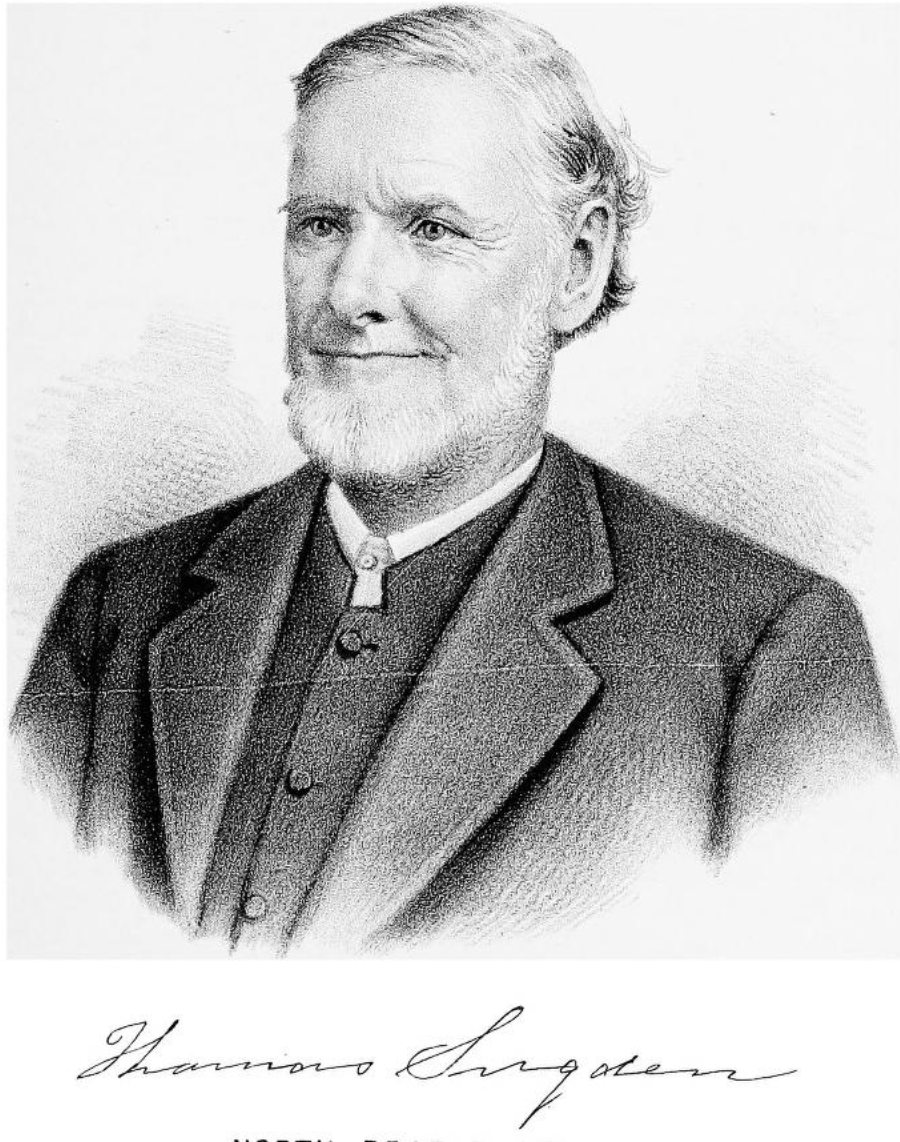

Member of the Wisconsin State Assembly from the Waukesha 3rd district
- In office January 5, 1857 – January 4, 1858
- Preceded by: John James
- Succeeded by: David Roberts
- In office January 5, 1852 – January 3, 1853
- Preceded by: Hosea Fuller Jr.
- Succeeded by: Edward Lees

Member of the Wisconsin State Assembly from the Waukesha 5th district
- In office January 1, 1849 – January 7, 1850
- Preceded by: Joseph Bond
- Succeeded by: Anson H. Taylor

Personal details
- Born: June 12, 1810 Millington, Yorkshire, UK
- Died: August 27, 1883 (aged 73) North Prairie, Wisconsin, U.S.
- Resting place: North Prairie Cemetery, North Prairie, Wisconsin
- Party: Republican; Whig (before 1855)
- Spouse: Hannah Slightam (m. 1835; died 1882)
- Children: Elizabeth Jane (Jones)^{(b. 1836; died 1919)}; John Sugden^{(b. 1839; died 1867)}; Jennie Sugden^{(b. 1841; died 1870)}; William H. Sugden^{(b. 1843; died 1877)}; George Sugden^{(b. 1845; died 1868)}; Andrew Sugden^{(b. 1848; died 1849)}; Emma Sugden^{(b. 1850; died 1868)}; Mary Ann Sugden^{(b. 1853; died 1854)}; Robert James Sugden^{(b. 1856; died 1883)}; Thomas Robert Sugden^{(b. 1858; died 1888)}

Thomas Sugden (June 12, 1810 – August 27, 1883) was an English American immigrant, farmer, and Wisconsin pioneer. He served three terms in the Wisconsin State Assembly, representing Waukesha County. Originally a Whig, he became an active member of the new Republican Party when it was organized in Wisconsin.

== Origins and early life ==
Sugden was born June 12, 1810, in Millington, in the East Riding of Yorkshire, England, son of John and Jane (Rickal or Rickle) Sugden, and attended the common schools of that place. He would later recount his voyage to Michigan Territory: Sailed from the port of Hull, in the ship Mayday, for New York, on April 14, 1834; arrived at the city of New York, June 1, 1834; left New York for Detroit, Mich., by steamer for Albany, June 3, 1834; Albany to Schenectady by rail, about sixteen miles (no other railroad at that time between New York and the Pacific Ocean); by canal from Schenectady to Buffalo; June 11, Buffalo to Detroit by steamer, arriving at Detroit June 14, 1834. In July 1834, he hired out to do haying and harvesting at what was then called "Bay settlement" in the Toledo strip (later to become part of Ohio) In his seven-week absence, a cholera epidemic struck Detroit, and roughly half the population died or left.

Sugden returned in late 1834 to Millington and on April 1, 1835, was married to Hannah Slightam, daughter of John and Elizabeth Slightam, of Millington. In mid-1835, he returned to Detroit, bringing with his wife, his family, and his wife's father and brothers. In mid-1836, he left Detroit for Milwaukee in Wisconsin Territory (which he described as "then a very small village") and spent some time on foot and by canoe exploring southeastern Wisconsin. He claimed land in the Town of Mukwonago in late 1836. He would sell that land and move to the town of Eagle (which he had helped name) in September, 1843; and from there to North Prairie (which he had also helped name) in the town of Genesee in October, 1849.

== Public offices ==
In 1842, Sugden was elected Assessor for Mukwonago. He was first appointed a notary public by Governor Nelson Dewey in 1849, and would retain that office through his retirement years. He held many minor offices in Eagle and North Prairie, and as chairman of the town board of Genesee served as a county supervisor for Waukesha County for all but three years between 1850 and 1858.

He was elected as a Whig to the 2nd Wisconsin Legislature (the 1849 session) from Waukesha County's 5th Assembly district (towns of Genesee, Delafield and Pewaukee), succeeding Democrat Joseph Bond. He was succeeded by Democrat Anson H. Taylor. He would return to the Assembly for the 1852 session, succeeding Democrat Hosea Fuller Jr. in what was now the 3rd Waukesha County district. He was succeeded in the next session by Democrat Orson Reed. He would serve one last term in the Assembly for 1857 (this time as a Republican), succeeding Democrat John James. He was succeeded by Democrat David Roberts.

== Retired ==
In 1880, he was described as a "retired farmer". He and Hannah had ten children, but only three were still living at the time of his death. Hannah died January 24, 1882; Thomas died August 27, 1883. Both of them are buried in North Prairie Cemetery, as is Sugden's mother Jane.
