= Cabochon =

Gemstone that has been shaped and polished

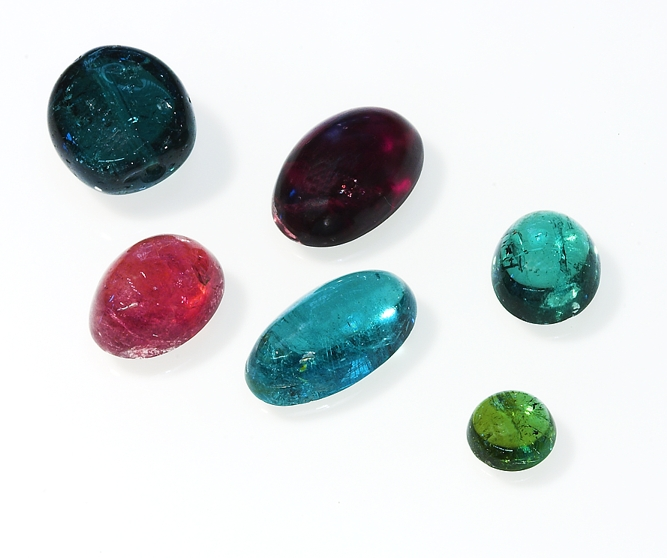
A collection of tourmaline cabochons in a variety of colours

A cabochon (/ˈkæbuʃɒn/; from Middle French caboche 'head') is a gemstone that has been shaped and polished, as opposed to faceted. The resulting form is usually a convex (rounded) obverse with a flat reverse. Cabochon was the default method of preparing gemstones before gemstone cutting developed.

== Application ==
Cutting en cabochon (French: "in the manner of a cabochon") is usually applied to opaque gems, while faceting is usually used for transparent stones. Hardness is also taken into account as softer gemstones with a hardness lower than 7 on the Mohs hardness scale are easily scratched, mainly by silicon dioxide in dust and grit. This would quickly make translucent gems unattractive—instead they are polished as cabochons, making the scratches less evident.

In asteriated stones such as star sapphires and chatoyant stones such as cat's eye chrysoberyl, a domed cabochon cut can show the star or eye, which would not be visible in a faceted cut.

The usual shape for cutting cabochons is an ellipse because the eye is less sensitive to small asymmetries in an ellipse than in a uniformly round shape such as a circle. Additionally, the elliptical shape, combined with the dome, is considered attractive. An exception is cabochons on some watch crowns, which are circular.

The procedure involves cutting a slab of the rough rock with a slab saw, and then stencilling a shape from a template. The slab is then trimmed near the marked line using a diamond blade saw—called a trim saw. Diamond-impregnated wheels or silicon carbide wheels can be used to grind the rough rock down. Most lapidary workshops and production facilities have moved away from silicon carbide to diamond grinding wheels or flat lap disks.

Once the piece is trimmed it can be "dopped" or completed by hand. "Dopping" is normally done by adhering the stone with hard wax onto a length of wooden dowel called a "dop stick". The piece is then ground to the template line, the back edges may be bevelled, and finally the top is sanded and polished to a uniform dome.

== Gallery ==
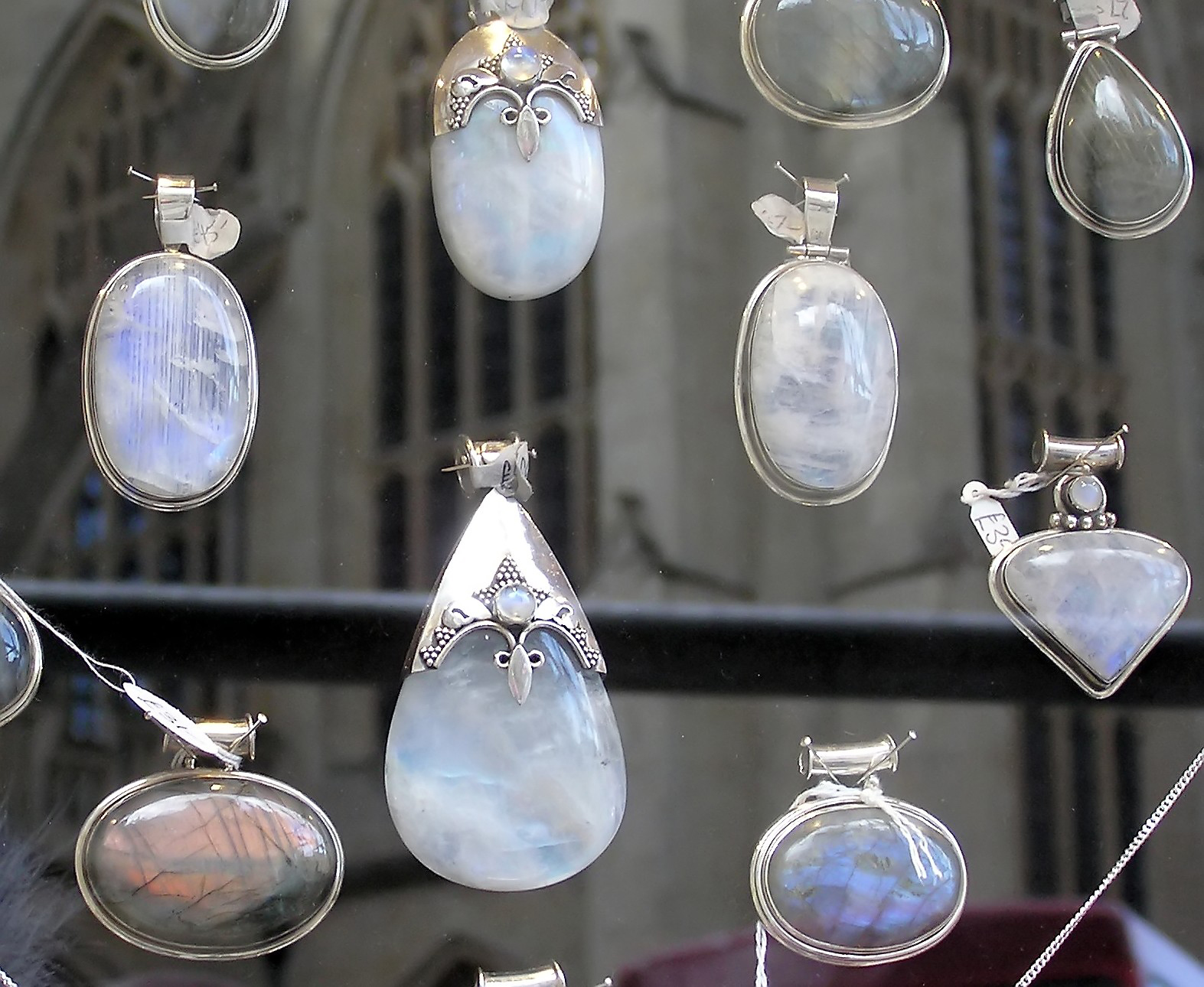
Moonstone cabochons in a jeweller's window

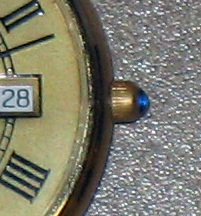
A round sapphire cabochon on the crown of a men's dress watch.

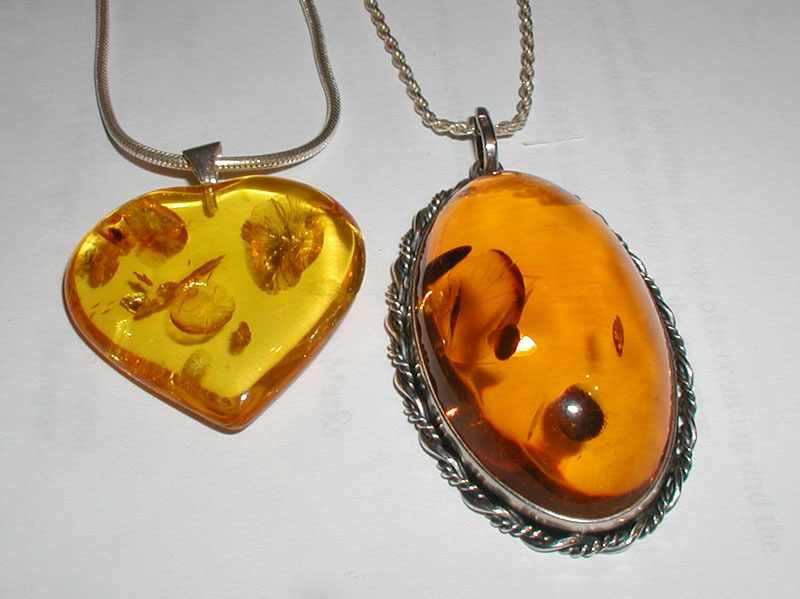
Amber pendants. The oval cabochon pendant is 52 × 32 mm (2 × 1.3 in).
