= SWANI Conference =

Wisconsin and Illinois high school athletic conference (1946–1952)

The Southern Wisconsin-Northern Illinois Conference, more commonly referred to as the SWANI Conference, is a former high school athletic conference with members in Wisconsin and Illinois. It was in existence from 1946 to 1952 and its member schools were affiliated with the Wisconsin Interscholastic Athletic Association and the Illinois High School Association.

== History ==
Location of SWANI Conference Members

The SWANI Conference was formed in 1946 by a group of eight similarly sized high schools: five in Wisconsin (Burlington, Delavan, Elkhorn, Lake Geneva and Whitewater) and three in Illinois (Harvard, Marengo and McHenry). The five Wisconsin high schools formerly comprised the Southern Five Conference, two high schools in Illinois (Harvard and Marengo) formerly competed in the North Six Conference, and McHenry competed independent of conference affiliation. This cross-border loop lasted for six seasons before the five Wisconsin-based high schools voted to disband the SWANI Conference after the 1952 football season. Soon after the conference's dissolution, the five Wisconsin high schools initiated talks with East Troy, Mukwonago and Wilmot (all members of the Southeastern Wisconsin Conference) to form a new athletic conference for the 1953–54 school year, which eventually was named the Southern Lakes Conference. The five former SWANI members played an independent home-and-home schedule for the remainder of the 1952–53 school year, filling open dates with the three members of the Southeastern Wisconsin Conference where feasible. The three Illinois-based high schools joined the IHSA-affiliated SHARK Conference after the demise of the SWANI Conference in 1952.

== Conference membership history ==
School	Location	Affiliation	Nickname	Colors	Joined	Left	Conference Joined	Current Conference
Burlington	Burlington, WI	Public	Demons		1946	1952	Southern Lakes	Southern Lakes
Delavan	Delavan, WI	Public	Comets		1946	1952	Southern Lakes	Rock Valley
Elkhorn	Elkhorn, WI	Public	Elks		1946	1952	Southern Lakes	Southern Lakes
Harvard	Harvard, IL	Public	Hornets		1946	1952	SHARK (IHSA)	Kishwaukee River (IHSA)
Lake Geneva	Lake Geneva, WI	Public	Resorters		1946	1952	Southern Lakes	Closed in 1958 (consolidated into Badger)
Marengo	Marengo, IL	Public	Indians		1946	1952	SHARK (IHSA)	Kishwaukee River (IHSA)
McHenry	McHenry, IL	Public	Warriors		1946	1952	SHARK (IHSA)	Fox Valley (IHSA)
Whitewater	Whitewater, WI	Public	Quakers		1946	1952	Southern Lakes	Rock Valley

== List of conference champions ==
=== Boys Basketball ===
School	Quantity	Years
Marengo	3	1947, 1949, 1952
Elkhorn	2	1951, 1952
Burlington	1	1950
Lake Geneva	1	1948
Delavan	0	
Harvard	0	
McHenry	0	
Whitewater	0	

=== Football ===
School	Quantity	Years
Harvard	2	1950, 1951
Burlington	1	1947
Delavan	1	1952
Elkhorn	1	1946
Lake Geneva	1	1948
Marengo	1	1948
Whitewater	1	1949
McHenry	0	
