= Southern Five Conference =

Wisconsin high school athletic conference (1928–1946)

The Southern Five Conference is a former high school athletic conference in Wisconsin. Its membership was concentrated in southeastern Wisconsin and was in existence from 1928 to 1946. All members were affiliated with the Wisconsin Interscholastic Athletic Association.

== History ==
Location of Original Southern Five Conference Members

The Southern Five Conference, alternatively known as the Little Five Conference and the Southern State Conference during its history, was formed in 1928 by a group of five medium-sized high schools in Racine and Walworth Counties: Burlington, Delavan (now Delavan-Darien), Elkhorn, Lake Geneva and Whitewater Normal. The addition of Walworth to the conference, first as a football-only member in 1932 and for all sports in 1935 brought the membership roster to its high of six schools. They would only last two more seasons as conference members, and the ledger experienced a net decrease to five schools with Whitewater Normal and Whitewater of the Rock River Valley League swapping affiliations. Competition lasted for eighteen years before the members of the Southern Five joined with three IHSA-affiliated high schools in neighboring McHenry County, Illinois (Harvard, Marengo and McHenry) to form the Southern Wisconsin-Northern Illinois Conference, more commonly known as the SWANI Conference, in 1946.

== Conference membership history ==
=== Final members ===
School	Location	Affiliation	Nickname	Colors	Joined	Left	Conference Joined	Current Conference
Burlington	Burlington, WI	Public	Demons		1928	1946	SWANI	Southern Lakes
Delavan	Delavan, WI	Public	Comets		1928	1946	SWANI	Rock Valley
Elkhorn	Elkhorn, WI	Public	Elks		1928	1946	SWANI	Southern Lakes
Lake Geneva	Lake Geneva, WI	Public	Resorters		1928	1946	SWANI	Closed in 1958 (consolidated into Badger)
Whitewater	Whitewater, WI	Public	Quakers		1937	1946	SWANI	Rock Valley

=== Previous members ===
School	Location	Affiliation	Nickname	Colors	Joined	Left	Conference Joined	Current Conference
Walworth	Walworth, WI	Public	Warriors		1935	1937	Independent	Closed in 1958 (consolidated into Big Foot)
Whitewater Normal	Whitewater, WI	Public (Lab school)	Quakers, Preps		1928	1937	Rock River Valley	Closed in 1959

=== Football-only members ===
School	Location	Affiliation	Mascot	Colors	Seasons	Primary Conference
Walworth	Walworth, WI	Public	Warriors		1932-1934	Southeastern Wisconsin

== List of conference champions ==
=== Boys Basketball ===
School	Quantity	Years
Delavan	8	1930, 1932, 1934, 1936, 1937, 1938, 1941, 1942
Burlington	7	1931, 1932, 1933, 1936, 1937, 1939, 1944
Elkhorn	3	1929, 1945, 1946
Lake Geneva	2	1935, 1943
Whitewater	1	1940
Walworth	0	
Whitewater Normal	0	

=== Football ===
School	Quantity	Years
Lake Geneva	6	1933, 1936, 1937, 1938, 1941, 1945
Burlington	4	1932, 1935, 1943, 1944
Delavan	3	1929, 1939, 1942
Elkhorn	3	1928, 1930, 1931
Walworth	1	1934
Whitewater	1	1940
Whitewater Normal	0	
