= BASD =

BASD may refer to:

- Burlington Area School District
- Butler Area School District
- Bethlehem Area School District
