= Burlington Area School District =

School district in Wisconsin, United States

Location
- Burlington, Wisconsin and surrounding area

District information
- Type: Public
- Grades: PK–12

Students and staff
- Students: 3,284

Other information
- Website: http://www.basd.k12.wi.us/

The Burlington Area School District (BASD) is a school district in the U.S. state of Wisconsin that serves Burlington and the surrounding area.

The district has eight schools:

School	Location	Grades	Students
Burlington High School	Burlington	9–12	1,083
Nettie E. Karcher Middle School	Burlington	7–8	553
Dr. Edward G. Dyer Intermediate School	Burlington	4–6	532
Cooper Elementary School	Burlington	PK–4	336
Waller Elementary School	Burlington	K–4	372
Winkler Elementary School	Burlington	K–4	203
Total			3,284

BASD is also a member of the Southern Lakes Alternative High School Consortium, allowing students in tenth through twelfth grade attend the Southern Lakes Corsortium Alternative High School. The school is also open to students from four other area school districts.

== Notable alumni ==
- Tony Romo (1998), sportscaster and former NFL football player

== Radio station ==
WBSD (89.1 FM) is the student high school radio station owned by the Burlington Area School District and operated by the staff and students.
