= Davis C. Rohr =

United States Air Force general (born 1929)

- Born: October 29, 1929 (age 96); Burlington, Wisconsin, USA
- Education: Northwestern University; University of Washington; United States Military Academy
- Military career
- Branch: US Air Force
- Service years: 1953-1987
- Unit: 51st Fighter-Interceptor Wing
- Commands: 67th Tactical Recon Wing; 388th Tactical Fighter Wing
- Conflicts: Korean War; Vietnam War
- Awards: Purple Heart; Meritorious Service Medal; Defense Superior Service Medal; Legion of Merit; Distinguished Flying Cross; Air Medal

Davis Charles Rohr (born October 29, 1929) is a retired major general in the United States Air Force.

== Biography ==
David Charles Rohr was born in Burlington, Wisconsin on October 29, 1929. He graduated from Burlington High School. Later he attended Northwestern University and the University of Washington.

== Career ==
Rohr graduated from the United States Military Academy in 1952. He joined the Air Force the following year. During the Korean War, he served with the 51st Fighter-Interceptor Wing and at Misawa Air Base. In 1960, he was assigned to the United States Air Force Academy as a member of the faculty. During the Vietnam War, he served with the 31st Tactical Fighter Wing. Later he was given the command of the 67th Tactical Reconnaissance Wing and the 388th Tactical Fighter Wing. Following his service in the war, he entered the Industrial College of the Armed Forces. In 1984, he was named Deputy Commander in Chief of the United States Central Command. His retirement was effective as of July 1, 1987.

Awards he has received include the Defense Superior Service Medal with oak leaf cluster, the Legion of Merit with oak leaf cluster, the Distinguished Flying Cross, the Purple Heart, the Meritorious Service Medal, the Air Medal with two silver oak leaf clusters and four bronze oak leaf clusters, and the Air Force Commendation Medal.
