= Harvard High School =

Harvard High School may refer to:

- Harvard High School (Nebraska) in Harvard, Nebraska
- Harvard High School (Illinois) in Harvard, Illinois
- Harvard High School (California) in Studio City, Los Angeles, California
