= Frank Cannella =

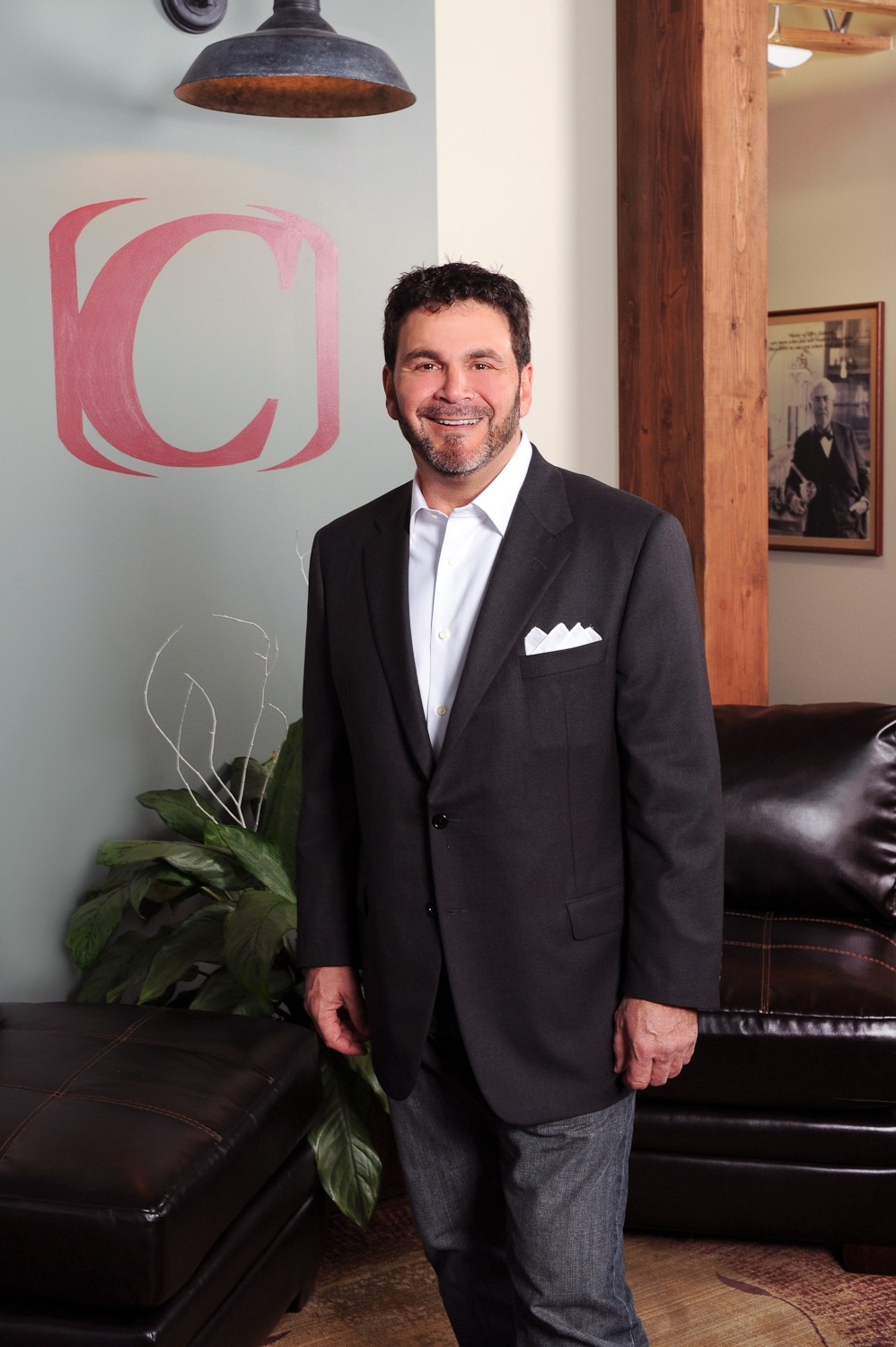
- Born: October 15, 1957 (age 68)
- Occupations: Businessman, philanthropist
- Known for: Cannella Response Television

Frank Cannella (born October 15, 1957) is a businessman and philanthropist, working in the infomercial industry. In 1999 People Magazine labeled him a pioneer in the infomercial industry. Cannella formed Cannella Response Television, which handled the 1990s Tae Bo exercise video infomercials advertising campaign.

== Career ==
In the 1980s Cannella worked with a Chicago advertising agency and focused predominantly on infomercials after completing a 1982 infomercial through the Chicago agency. He relocated to Burlington, Wisconsin in 1984 and formed Cannella Response Television.

== Personal life ==
Cannella provides Christmas gifts for challenged children.

== Recognition ==
- Direct Response Television Hall of Fame (2013)
- Bravo! Entrepreneur Award (2006).
