= Alma M. Aldrich =

American politician

Member of the Wisconsin State Assembly
- In office 1878–1878

Personal details
- Born: May 6, 1837 Kirtland, Ohio
- Died: November 1, 1902 (aged 65) Burlington, Wisconsin

Alma M. Aldrich (May 6, 1837 in Kirtland, Ohio – November 1, 1902 in Burlington, Wisconsin) was a member of the Wisconsin State Assembly. His father was a politician and justice of the peace.

== Career ==
Aldrich was a member of the Assembly in 1878. He had previously been elected to the Walworth County, Wisconsin Board of Supervisors in 1871 and went on to become its Chairman.
