= Burlington High School (Wisconsin) =

Coordinates: 42.670948°N 88.252435°W

Location
- 400 McCanna Parkway; Burlington, Wisconsin; United States

Information
- Type: Public secondary
- Motto: Community of Learners
- Oversight: Burlington Area School District
- Principal: Amy Levonian
- Teaching staff: 63.92 (FTE)
- Grades: 9–12
- Enrollment: 937 (2023-2024)
- Student to teacher ratio: 14.66
- Colors: black and orange
- Athletics conference: Southern Lakes Conference
- Nickname: Demons
- Website: bhs.basd.k12.wi.us

Burlington High School is a public high school in Burlington, Wisconsin. It is administered by the Burlington Area School District. The school's mascot is the Demon and its colors are orange and black. Its fight song borrows the melody of the traditional Navy song Anchor's Aweigh.

== Academics ==
Burlington High School owns and operates a radio station, 89.1 WBSD, one of the first high school radio stations in Wisconsin. Founded in 1975 by Terry Havel, WBSD is operated by a staff of students, faculty, and community members.

== Athletics ==
BHS athletic teams participate in the Wisconsin Interscholastic Athletic Association Division 1 and are a part of the Southern Lakes Conference. BHS won a state championship in boys' cross country in 1965, girls' volleyball team won the WIAA state championship in 2011, 2012, 2017, and 2018.

=== Athletic conference affiliation history ===
- Southern Five Conference (1928-1946)
- SWANI Conference (1946-1952)
- Southern Lakes Conference (1953-1997)
- Southeast Conference (1997-2009)
- Southern Lakes Conference (2009–present)

== Extracurricular activities ==
BHS has a chapter of the international service organization Key Club. The school also has a competitive show choir, B*JAZZLED, and hosts an annual show choir competition, the Chocolate City Showcase.

== Notable alumni ==
- Henry Allen Cooper (class of 1869): Republican member of the United States House of Representatives from Wisconsin's 1st district from 1893 to 1919 and 1921 to 1931; member of the Wisconsin State Senate for the Racine County district from 1887 to 1889
- Greg Itzin (Class of 1966): American film and television actor. He is best known for his role as U.S. President Charles Logan in the television series 24.
- Kelly Kahl (Class of 1985): Television executive. Current President of CBS Entertainment.
- Bill Kazmaier (Class of 1972): American former world champion powerlifter, world champion strongman and professional wrestler.
- Tony Romo (Class of 1998): Professional football player, quarterback for the Dallas Cowboys of the NFL from 2003 to 2016. Former broadcaster at CBS Sports.
- Robin Vos (Class of 1986): Republican member of the Wisconsin State Assembly, 63rd district since 2004
