= WBSD =

- Burlington, Wisconsin; United States
- Frequency: 89.1 MHz
- Branding: 89 WBSD

Programming
- Format: High School/AAA

Ownership
- Owner: Burlington Area School District

History
- First air date: April 7, 1975
- Call sign meaning: Burlington School District

Technical information
- Facility ID: 7837
- Class: A
- ERP: 520 watts
- HAAT: 28 meters (92 feet)
- Transmitter coordinates: 42°40′14″N 88°16′18″W

Links
- Webcast: WBSD Webstream
- Website: WBSD Online

WBSD (89.1 FM) is a high school radio station licensed to serve Burlington, Wisconsin, US. The station is owned by the Burlington Area School District and operated by the staff and students of Burlington High School. The station's studios are on the current Burlington High School campus but the transmitter site used to be at Karcher Middle School which was housed in the former Burlington High School building. Karcher School was torn down and the tower was moved to McCanna Parkway and placed on the roof of the current high school in the summer of 2021. The current General Manager, Promise Bruce, began managing the station in September 2025, becoming the fourth General Manager in the station's history after Thomas Gilding, Arlo Ketchpaw, and the station's founder, Wisconsin Broadcasters' Association Hall of Fame Member, Terry Havel.

== Programming ==
WBSD broadcasts a community-oriented adult album alternative (aka "Triple A") music format. The station broadcasts 24 hours a day, 7 days a week. In addition to its usual music programming, WBSD airs live play-by-play broadcasts of Burlington High School sporting events.

== Student involvement ==
Burlington High School offers a number of classes to help familiarize students with radio station operations, FCC regulations, and broadcasting best practices. The "Broadcasting 1" class allows students to get licensed by the Federal Communications Commission and gives them their first chance of being on the air. The "Broadcasting 2" class gives students experience in recording and producing radio shows. The advanced "Broadcast Seminar" class teaches students more advanced radio skills and puts students in charge of the day-to-day operation of WBSD.

== History ==
WBSD first broadcast on April 7, 1975, under the direction of general manager and broadcasting teacher Terry Havel. In 2008, shortly after stepping down as general manager of WBSD, Havel was recognized with induction into the Wisconsin Broadcasters Hall of Fame for his work at WBSD and across Wisconsin.

More than four dozen WBSD alumni have gone on to careers in commercial broadcasting, including disc jockeys in Milwaukee and across the country, station management, and Kelly Kahl who is the Senior Executive Vice President of Programming Operations for CBS Television.

== See also ==
- List of community radio stations in the United States
