= Tony Romo =

American football player and television analyst (born 1980)

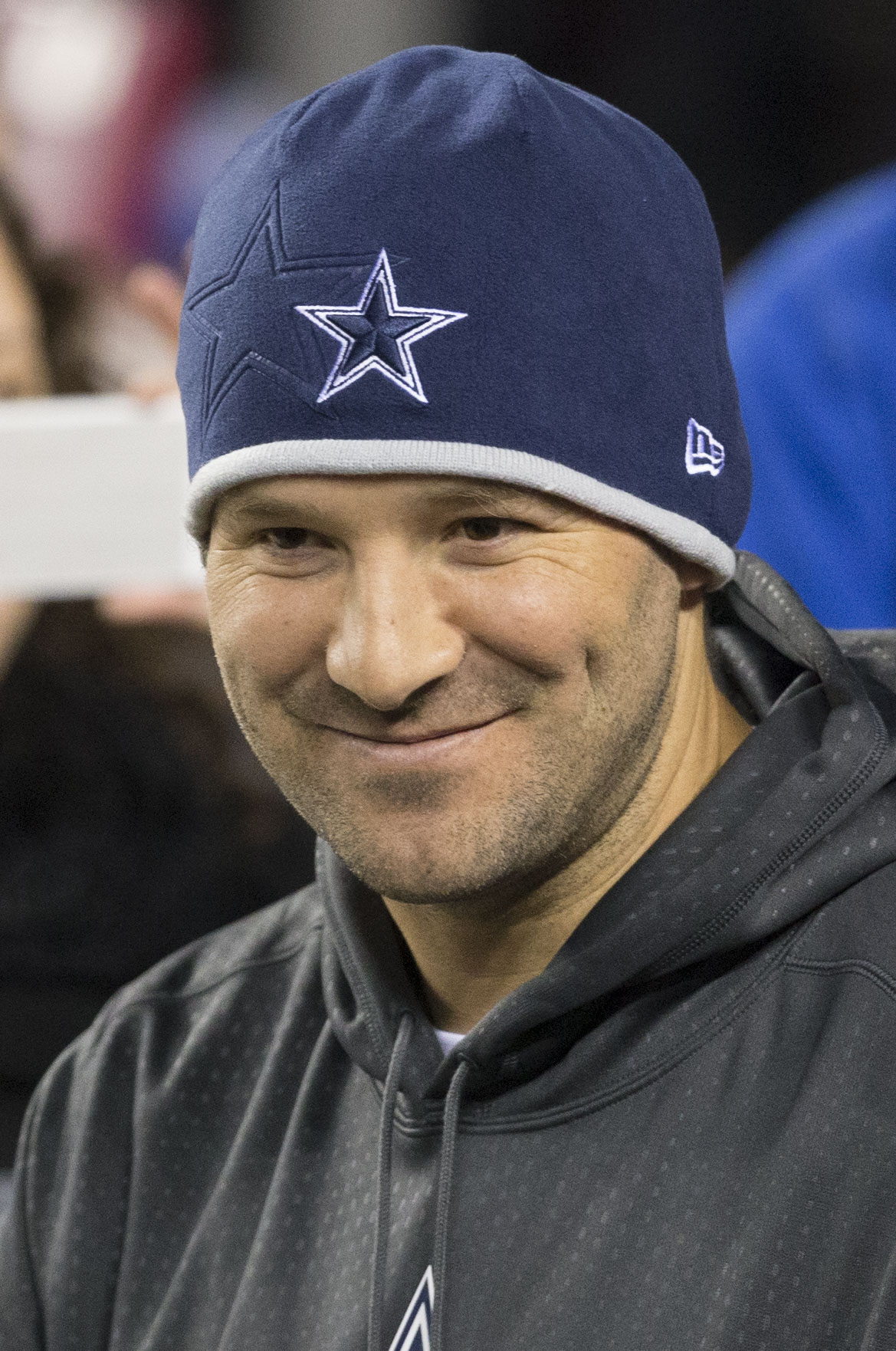
- Romo with the Dallas Cowboys in 2015

No. 9
- Position: Quarterback

Personal information
- Born: April 21, 1980 (age 46); San Diego, California, U.S.
- Listed height: 6 ft 2 in (1.88 m)
- Listed weight: 230 lb (104 kg)

Career information
- High school: Burlington (Burlington, Wisconsin)
- College: Eastern Illinois (1999–2002)
- NFL draft: 2003: undrafted

Career history
- Dallas Cowboys (2003–2016)

Awards and highlights
- Second-team All-Pro (2014); 4× Pro Bowl (2006, 2007, 2009, 2014); NFL passer rating leader (2014); NFL completion percentage leader (2014); Walter Payton Award (2002); First-team I-AA All-American (2002); Third-team I-AA All-American (2001); 3× OVC Player of the Year (2000–2002); 3× First-team All-OVC (2000–2002); Eastern Illinois Panthers No. 17 retired

Career NFL statistics
- Passing attempts: 4,335
- Passing completions: 2,829
- Completion percentage: 65.3%
- TD–INT: 248–117
- Passing yards: 34,183
- Passer rating: 97.1
- Stats at Pro Football Reference
- College Football Hall of Fame

Antonio Ramiro Romo (born April 21, 1980) is an American former professional football quarterback who played in the National Football League (NFL) for 13 seasons with the Dallas Cowboys. He played college football for the Eastern Illinois Panthers, winning the Walter Payton Award in 2002 and being named OVC Player of the Year three times. Romo signed with the Cowboys as an undrafted free agent in 2003.

As the Cowboys' primary starter from 2006 to 2015, Romo led the Cowboys to four postseason appearances, while also receiving Pro Bowl honors during each playoff run. Romo lost his starting position in 2016 to rookie backup Dak Prescott due to a preseason back injury and retired after the year. Upon retiring, he became the lead color analyst for NFL on CBS, a position he held until being terminated in 2026.

Romo holds several Cowboys team records, including passing touchdowns, passing yards, most games with at least 300 passing yards, and games with three or more touchdown passes. He also held a higher passer rating in the fourth quarter than any other NFL quarterback from 2006 to 2013. Romo was less successful in the postseason, winning only two of the six playoff games he appeared in and never advancing beyond the divisional round. (Note: Attributed to multiple references:) He was inducted into the College Football Hall of Fame in 2021. He is widely considered one of the greatest undrafted players in NFL history.

== Early life ==
Romo was born in San Diego, California, to Ramiro Romo Jr. and Joan Jakubowski, who is of German and Polish ancestry.. A "Navy brat", he was born while his father was stationed at the San Diego U.S. Naval Base. The Romos later returned to Burlington, Wisconsin, where Ramiro worked as a carpenter and construction worker and Joan worked as a grocery store clerk. Romo played baseball as a child and was selected to the Little League All-Star team.

Romo's paternal grandfather, Ramiro Romo Sr., emigrated from Múzquiz, Coahuila, Mexico, to San Antonio, Texas, as an adolescent. The elder Romo cites Tony's success as an example of the possibilities afforded to immigrants in the United States: "I've always said this is a country of opportunities. If you don't get a job or an education, it's because you don't want to."

Romo started as quarterback for the Burlington High School Demons beginning as a junior (1996 season). In the 1997 season, Romo and the Demons finished with a 3–6 record, though he earned several honors, including the All-Racine County football team and Wisconsin Football Coaches Association All-State first-team honors. Romo also was a starter on the Burlington High School varsity basketball team and also played golf and tennis. In 1998, he joined Caron Butler on the All-Racine County (Wisconsin) team. With per-game averages of 24.3 points, 8.8 rebounds and 4.7 assists, Romo was sought by some mid-major basketball schools in the NCAA such as Wisconsin-Green Bay. He graduated from Burlington High School in 1998, with his 1,080 points being the all-time scoring record for the Burlington basketball varsity.

== College career ==
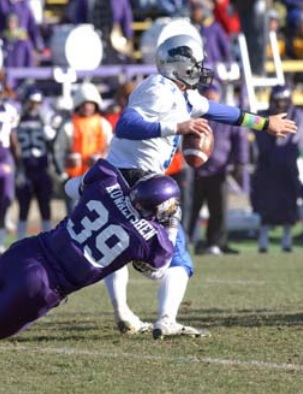
Romo at Eastern Illinois

Romo attended Eastern Illinois University in Charleston, Illinois, where he played for the NCAA Division I-AA Eastern Illinois Panthers football team and was a member of Sigma Pi. As a sophomore in 2000, Romo ranked second in Division I-AA in passing efficiency, completing 164-of-278 (59%) passes for 2,583 yards and 27 touchdowns. After the season, he was honored as an All-America honorable mention, an All-Ohio Valley Conference member, and the OVC Player of the Year.

As a junior, Romo led Division I-AA in passing efficiency, completing 138-of-207 passes for 2,068 yards and 21 touchdowns.

Romo earned OVC Player of the Week honors on October 14, 2002, after his eight-yard scramble run on the last play of the game led Eastern Illinois to a 25–24 win over Eastern Kentucky. On December 19, 2002, Romo became the first player in Eastern Illinois and Ohio Valley Conference history to win the Walter Payton Award, given annually to the top Division I-AA football player. He finished his career holding school and conference records with 85 touchdown passes. Romo finished second in school and third in conference history with 8,212 passing yards and second in school history with 584 completions and 941 attempts.

As a senior, Romo set school and conference records for completions with 258 in 407 attempts for 3,418 yards. This was second in conference and third in school history for a season. He threw for 34 touchdowns and scored a rushing touchdown. His 3,149 yards in total offense as a senior ranked third in school and conference history. Along with the Walter Payton Award, Romo earned consensus All-America honors. He was also selected All-Ohio Valley Conference and was named OVC Player of the Year for the third straight year.

During homecoming weekend on October 17, 2009, Eastern Illinois University retired Romo's No. 17 jersey and inducted him into EIU's Hall of Fame. Romo is the first Eastern Illinois player to have his number retired. Romo said about the event, "It was such an honor to be inducted into the Hall of Fame here, and with the jersey ceremony, it holds a special place in your heart."

On December 7, 2021, Romo was inducted into the College Football Hall of Fame as a member of the 2021 class.

== Professional career ==
Pre-draft measurables
Height	Weight	Arm length	Hand span	40-yard dash	10-yard split	20-yard split	20-yard shuttle	Three-cone drill	Vertical jump	Broad jump	Wonderlic
6 ft 2 in (1.88 m)	230 lb (104 kg)	32 in (0.81 m)	9 5/8 in (0.24 m)	5.01 s	1.72 s	2.90 s	4.20 s	7.11 s	30 in (0.76 m)	8 ft 9 in (2.67 m)	37
All values were taken at the NFL Scouting Combine.

=== 2003–2005 ===
Romo did not initially receive an invitation to attend the 2003 NFL Combine, but received a late invitation to attend as an extra quarterback to throw passes to other prospects during drills. Despite intriguing some scouts, he went undrafted by any NFL team during the 2003 NFL draft. Throughout the draft, Romo was assured by Dallas assistant head coach Sean Payton of the Cowboys' interest (Romo was also intensely pursued by Denver Broncos head coach Mike Shanahan), and shortly afterwards was signed as an undrafted rookie free agent by the Dallas Cowboys. Romo entered the 2003 training camp third on the Cowboys' depth chart behind Quincy Carter and Chad Hutchinson. In 2004, the Cowboys released Hutchinson and signed veteran quarterback Vinny Testaverde and traded a third-round draft pick to the Houston Texans for quarterback Drew Henson. Romo faced being cut from the roster until Carter was released following allegations of substance abuse. Throughout 2004 and 2005, Romo served as the holder for placekicks. After Vinny Testaverde's tenure in Dallas ended in 2005, the Cowboys signed veteran quarterback Drew Bledsoe, the team's eighth starting quarterback since 2000.

One of Romo's early career highlights was in 2004, when (as the third-string quarterback) he rushed for the winning touchdown with six seconds left in a preseason game against the Oakland Raiders. Elevated to the Cowboys' second quarterback in 2005, Romo had strong showings in the 2005 and 2006 pre-seasons. In the 2006 offseason, Sean Payton (now head coach of the New Orleans Saints), offered a third-round draft pick for Romo, but Cowboys' owner Jerry Jones refused, asking for no less than a second-round draft pick.

=== 2006 season ===
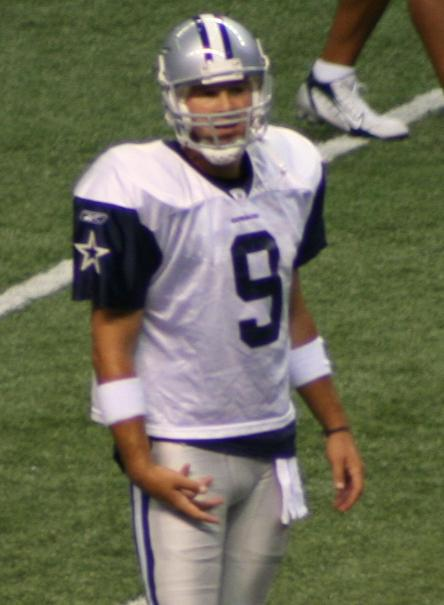
Romo during the 2006 preseason

Romo began the season as a backup to starter Drew Bledsoe. He took his first regular season snap at quarterback during a Week 6 34–6 victory over the Houston Texans. Romo's first NFL pass was a 33-yard completion to wide receiver Sam Hurd. His only other pass of the game was a two-yard touchdown, his first in the NFL, to wide receiver Terrell Owens.

A week later, Romo replaced Bledsoe for the start of the second half of a game against the New York Giants. His first pass was tipped and intercepted. Romo finished the 36–22 loss throwing for 227 yards, two touchdowns, and three interceptions (one of which was returned for a touchdown). On October 25, Cowboys head coach Bill Parcells announced that Romo would be the Cowboys starting quarterback for the Week 8 matchup against the Carolina Panthers. He led the Cowboys to a 35–14 road victory in his first game as a starter.

During Week 11 against the Indianapolis Colts, the NFL's last unbeaten team, Romo completed 19-of-23 passes for 226 yards and an interception as the Cowboys won by a score of 21–14. Four days later, he helped the Cowboys win in a Thanksgiving Day game against the Tampa Bay Buccaneers by a score of 38–10. Romo completed 22-of-29 passes for 306 yards and a career-high five touchdowns. In the month of November, Romo won NFC Offensive Player of the Week twice, once for the Week 10 game against the Arizona Cardinals and the other for Week 12 against the Buccaneers.

Romo aided the Cowboys in clinching a playoff spot, their second since Parcells became coach in 2003. Romo ended the regular season with 220 completions on 337 pass attempts for 2,903 yards, 19 touchdowns, and 13 interceptions for a passer rating of 95.1.

The Cowboys played the Seattle Seahawks in the NFC Wild Card Round on January 6, 2007. With the Cowboys trailing 21–20 on fourth-and-one with 1:19 left in the game, the Cowboys attempted a 19-yard field goal. Romo, the holder for the kick, fumbled the snap. He recovered the ball and attempted to run it in, but was tackled short of the first down marker, and turned the ball over on the Seattle 2-yard line. The Cowboys went on to lose the game. Romo finished the 2006 season ranked seventh in the NFC in passing yards (2,903) and touchdown passes (19).

Romo played in the 2007 Pro Bowl after Drew Brees went down with an elbow injury as a substitution for Marc Bulger. He threw a touchdown and an interception, and was the NFC's kickoff holder in the game.

=== 2007 season ===
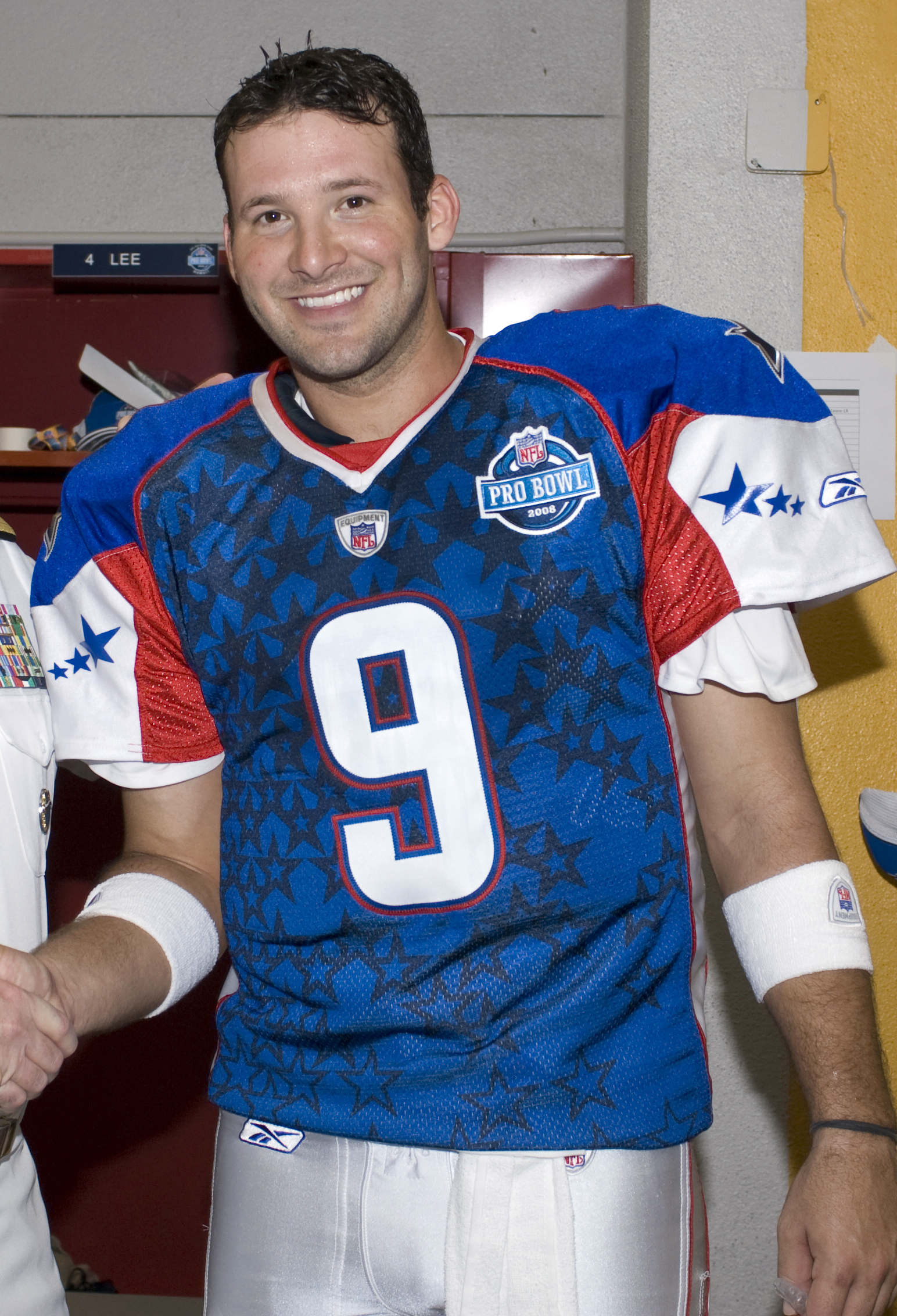
Romo before the 2008 Pro Bowl

During the season-opening 45–35 victory over the New York Giants, Romo threw for 345 yards, four touchdowns, and an interception to go along with three carries for 11 yards and his first rushing touchdown. Romo earned NFC Offensive Player of the Week honors for his performance against the Giants. Two weeks later against the Chicago Bears, Romo threw for 329 yards, two touchdowns, and an interception during a 34–10 victory. In the next game, he had 339 passing yards and three touchdowns to go along with three carries 24 yards and a touchdown during a 35–7 victory over the St. Louis Rams. Romo earned NFC Offensive Player of the Month for September. In September 2007, Romo's father was diagnosed with prostate cancer. Romo stated that, while upset about the family crisis, he still had to continue to focus on his career.

During a narrow Week 5 25–24 victory over the Buffalo Bills on Monday Night Football, Romo threw for 309 yards, two touchdowns, and five interceptions (four in the first half, two of which were returned for touchdowns) while also losing a fumble. He became the second person in the history of Monday Night Football to throw five interceptions in a winning effort.

On October 29, Romo reached an agreement to a six-year, $67.5 million contract extension with the Cowboys.

During a Week 12 37–27 victory over the Green Bay Packers, Romo threw for 309 yards, four touchdowns, and an interception; his four touchdowns brought his season total to 33, breaking Danny White's (29) record from 1983. Romo earned NFC Offensive Player of the Week for his game against the Packers. During a Week 16 20–13 road victory over the Carolina Panthers, he completed 28-of-42 passes for 257 yards, a touchdown, and an interception while also becoming the first Cowboys' quarterback to pass for more than 4,000 yards in a season. In the regular-season finale against the Washington Redskins, Romo broke the Cowboys' season completions record with his 335th completion, a short pass to tight end Jason Witten.

The Cowboys finished the season atop the NFC East with a 13–3 record and qualified for the playoffs. Romo finished the 2007 season with 4,211 passing yards, 36 touchdowns, and 19 interceptions to go along with 31 carries for 129 yards and two touchdowns. He earned a second consecutive Pro Bowl nomination.

In the Cowboys' Divisional Round game against the New York Giants, Romo was unable to lead his team to a come-from-behind victory. On fourth down with less than half a minute and no timeouts left, Romo threw the ball into the end zone, but it was intercepted by Giants cornerback R. W. McQuarters, ensuring that the Cowboys were eliminated from the playoffs with a 21–17 loss to the eventual Super Bowl XLII champions.

=== 2008 season ===
During the season-opening 28–10 road victory over the Cleveland Browns, Romo completed 24-of-32 passes for 320 yards, a touchdown, and an interception. After the game, Romo required 13 stitches for a large gash on his chin that occurred during the third quarter when linebacker Willie McGinest hit Romo in the chin with his helmet. The NFL fined McGinest $7,500 for the hit. In the next game against the Philadelphia Eagles, Romo completed 21-of-30 passes for 312 yards, three touchdowns, and an interception during a 41–37 victory. The 54 combined points scored by the Cowboys and Eagles in the first half were the second most points scored in a half during a Monday Night Football game. That same month, Romo signed a five-year, $10 million endorsement deal with apparel marketer Starter, but was not allowed to wear footwear on the field as the company did not have a contract with the NFL.

Romo and the Cowboys won their third straight game against the Green Bay Packers before losing to the Washington Redskins in Week 4, falling to 3–1. Following a Week 5 31–22 victory over the Cincinnati Bengals, Romo was injured in a loss to the Arizona Cardinals. The Cowboys, under Brad Johnson, went 1–2 the next three games, losing to the St. Louis Rams, beating the Tampa Bay Buccaneers, and losing to the New York Giants.

In what became a de facto third playoff game for Romo shortly prior to its start, the Cowboys failed to compete against the Eagles in a 44–6 road loss during the regular-season finale. Romo committed three turnovers (an interception and two fumbles) in the game and threw for 183 yards and no touchdowns. The loss dropped his combined record in December to 5–8 and again raised questions about his performance in games of consequence.

=== 2009 season ===
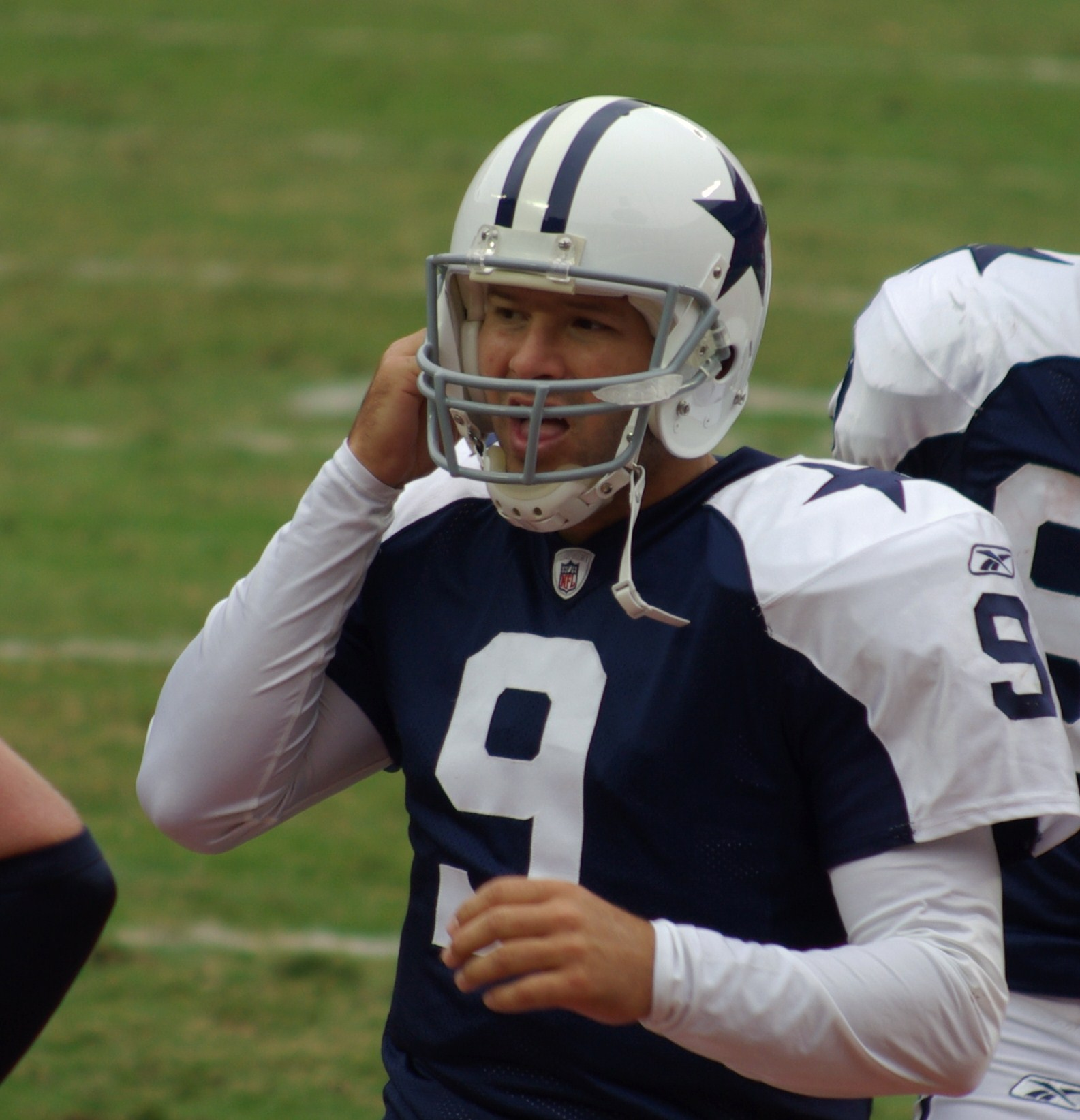
Romo in 2009

During the season-opening 34–21 road victory over the Tampa Bay Buccaneers in their season opener, Romo completed 16-of-27 passes for a then-career-high 353 yards and three touchdowns. In the next game against the New York Giants, he completed 13-of-29 passes for 127 yards, a touchdown, and three interceptions (one of which was returned for a touchdown for the Giants) while also rushing for a three-yard touchdown during a narrow 33–31 loss.

During a Week 13 31–24 road loss to the Giants, Romo threw for a career-high 392 yards and three touchdowns. In the next game against the San Diego Chargers, Romo resumed holding duties for the first time since 2006 after several kicks were missed by kicker Nick Folk due to bad holds by punter Mat McBriar. The following week, Romo led the Cowboys to a win against an undefeated team late in the season for the second time in his career. The Cowboys defeated the 13–0 New Orleans Saints 24–17 on the road as Romo threw for 312 yards and a touchdown. He earned NFC Offensive Player of the Month for December.

Romo finished the 2009 season as the first quarterback in team history to take every snap for a full season. He also passed his own mark for single season passing yardage, with 4,483 yards, and became the first Cowboys quarterback to throw more than 20 touchdowns and fewer than 10 interceptions in a season. Romo's eight 300-yard games were also a team record, surpassing his own record from 2007. Romo's 1.6% interception percentage tied a team record, and his career interception percentage became the lowest in franchise history.

The Cowboys became the NFC East division champions with their season finale 24–0 shutout over the Philadelphia Eagles, the second division title in Romo's three full seasons as the starting quarterback. Romo was named to the Pro Bowl for the third time in his career.

Romo had 244 passing yards and two touchdowns for a 104.9 passer rating during a 34–14 victory over the Philadelphia Eagles in the Wild Card Round of the playoffs, earning the first playoff win in 13 years for the Cowboys, and his own first career postseason victory. However, the following week in the Divisional Round against the #2-seed Minnesota Vikings, Romo threw for 198 yards and an interception while also fumbling thrice (losing two of them) and being sacked six times during the 34–3 blowout road loss.

=== 2010 season ===
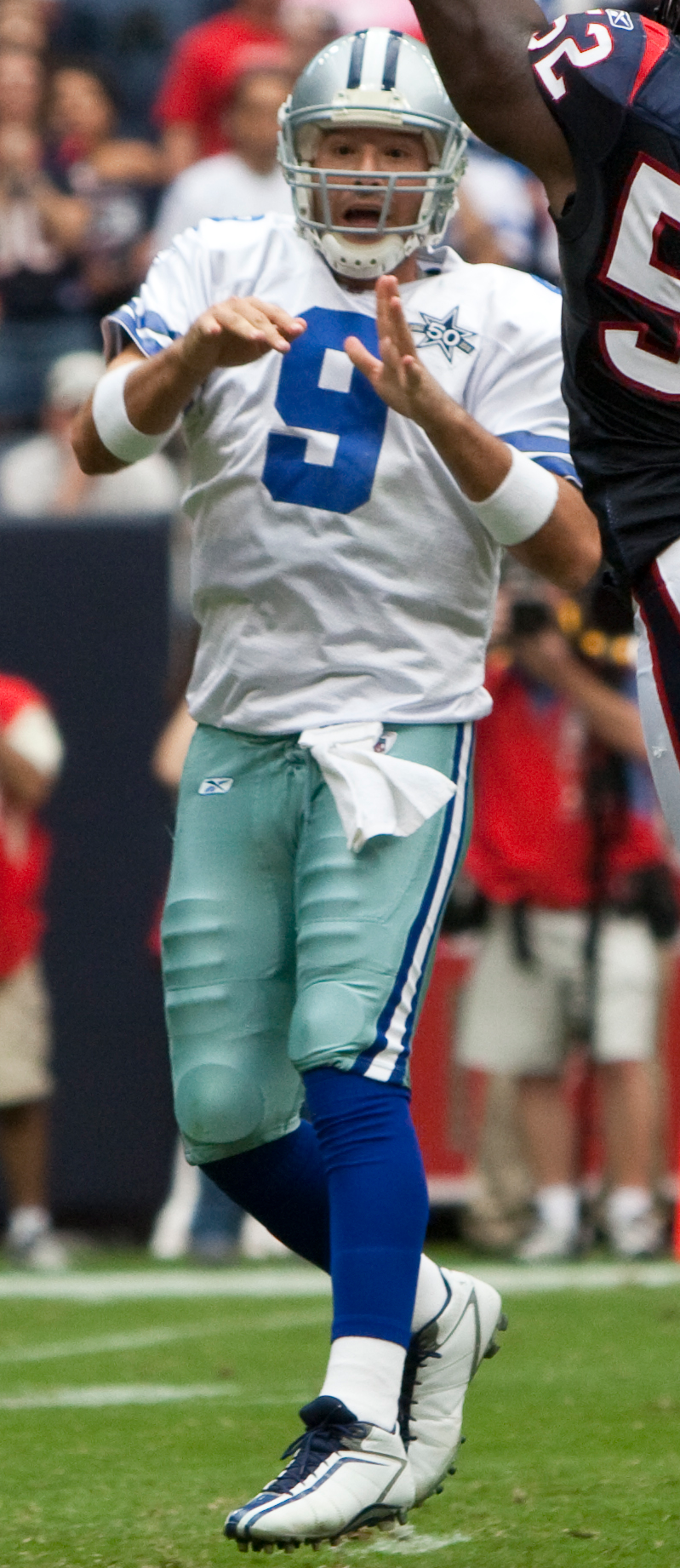
Romo in 2010

During a Week 5 34–27 loss to the Tennessee Titans, Romo threw for a career-high 406 yards and three touchdowns, but he also threw two costly interceptions in the fourth quarter. By mid-October, the Cowboys were desperate for a win with a record of 1–3 and last in the division. They played against the Minnesota Vikings in Week 6, who also had a 1–3 record and were in need of a win. Romo threw for over 200 yards and three touchdowns but also threw two costly interceptions during the 24–21 road loss.

During a Week 7 41–35 loss to the New York Giants, Romo threw for 39 yards and a touchdown before suffering a broken left clavicle in the second quarter when he was driven to the turf by linebacker Michael Boley. Romo was placed on injured reserve on December 21, 2010, and replaced by veteran Jon Kitna. Despite his limited playing time, Romo was still ranked 72nd by his fellow players on the NFL Top 100 Players of 2011.

=== 2011 season ===
Romo's 102.5 quarterback rating in 2011 was fourth best in the league behind Aaron Rodgers, Drew Brees, and Tom Brady, and second highest in Cowboys history.

Romo had four fourth-quarter comebacks in 2011. During Week 2 against the San Francisco 49ers, Romo suffered a broken rib and a punctured lung on a hit from Carlos Rogers in the second quarter that forced him to miss part of the game. Romo came back in the final seconds of the third quarter and played the fourth quarter throwing for a touchdown and driving down the field for the game-tying field goal with four seconds left in the game to force overtime. On the first offensive possession for the Cowboys in overtime, Romo connected with Jesse Holley for 77 yards to set up the 19 yard game-winning field goal. Romo finished the game with 345 yards and two touchdowns with a 116.4 rating despite the cracked rib and punctured lung. For his performance in this game, Romo earned the NFC's Offensive player of the Week Award. Romo played with a protective vest for a few games to protect his torso.

Romo posted the second highest quarterback rating of his career with a rating of 148.40 during a Week 10 44–7 victory over the Buffalo Bills. During a Week 16 20–7 loss to the Philadelphia Eagles, Romo left the game after attempting just two passes with no completions after suffering a severely bruised hand when he smashed it against an opposing player's helmet. In the regular-season finale at MetLife Stadium against the New York Giants, the NFC East title and a playoff spot was at stake for whichever team won, with the loser eliminated from playoff contention. Romo started the game despite the hand injury the previous week. He completed 29-of-37 passes (his second highest completion rate of the season) for 289 yards, two touchdowns, and an interception for a 106.0 quarterback rating, as the Cowboys lost the game 31–14 and dropped to an 8–8 record, eliminating them from playoff contention.

Romo accounted for 32 of the 39 total touchdowns the Cowboys scored in the 2011 NFL season (82.1%). No other player in the 2011 regular season contributed a higher percentage of team touchdowns (Cam Newton with 72.9% was second). Romo finished the 2011 season with 4,184 passing yards, 31 touchdowns, and 10 interceptions to go along with 22 carries for 46 yards and a touchdown. He was ranked 91st by his fellow players on the NFL Top 100 Players of 2012.

=== 2012 season ===
Daniel Jeremiah, an NFL.com analyst, ranked Romo as the ninth best quarterback in the league heading into the 2012 season.

During the season-opening 24–17 road victory over the New York Giants, Romo threw for 307 yards, three touchdowns, and an interception. During a Week 8 29–24 loss to the Giants, he passed for 437 yards, a touchdown, and four interceptions while attempting a career-high 62 passes. In Week 12, against the Washington Redskins on Thanksgiving Day, he passed for 441 yards, three touchdowns, and two interceptions. He matched his career-best 62 pass attempts in the 38–31 loss. In a Week 13 38–33 win against the Philadelphia Eagles, Romo threw three touchdown passes. The first pass, a 23-yard throw to Dez Bryant with 11:18 left in the third quarter, gave Romo 166 career touchdown passes, surpassing the previous franchise record of 165 which had been held by Troy Aikman.

After trailing the Cincinnati Bengals 19–10 with 6:35 left, Dallas narrowly won 20–19 in Week 14 (December 9). The fourth quarter comeback consisted of a 27-yard touchdown pass from Romo to Bryant and a last-second 40-yard field goal by Bailey to win 20–19. Romo went 25-for-43 for 268 yards, with one touchdown and one interception.

Topping a three-game winning streak and winning its fifth out of six games, Dallas beat the Pittsburgh Steelers 27–24 in overtime in Week 15 (December 16). The win put Dallas in a three-way tie with the New York Giants and Washington Redskins in the NFC East. Romo surpassed 25,000 career passing yards in this game with 30-for-42 passing for 341 yards and two touchdowns.

During Week 16, despite Romo's four touchdown passes and 416 passing yards (on 26-for-43 passing), the Cowboys lost to the New Orleans Saints, 34–31, in overtime. Following that game, Dallas and the Washington Redskins faced off in Week 17 for the NFC East title, where Dallas lost on the road by a score of 28–18. With overall 20-for-37 passing, Romo threw a total of three interceptions, including on Dallas' first two drives. With 5:50 left and down 21–10, Romo made a touchdown pass to Kevin Ogletree and two-point conversion pass to Dwayne Harris. After Dallas took over with 3:33 left down 21–18, Romo threw an interception to Redskins linebacker Rob Jackson, and Washington clinched the victory with another touchdown. Dallas finished the 2012 season with an 8–8 record and failed to make the playoffs for the third straight season. While his 19 interceptions led the league, Romo was credited with five fourth-quarter comebacks.

Following the season, the future of Romo's career was called into question. Mac Engel of the Fort Worth Star-Telegram commented: "Tony Romo has one year remaining on his contract, but the time has come for him to move on...He will be 33 in April of '13, and still has a few good years left but at this point he needs to go to another team that needs a quarterback." In a Fox Sports Southwest interview, Rick Gosselin of The Dallas Morning News also called Romo "not wired to win the last game of the season" especially "[i]f it means extending the season." Dan Graziano of ESPNDallas.com wrote that Romo's "record starts to become very hard to defend" due to "the oft-cited fact that he's got just the one playoff win in his entire career."

=== 2013 season ===
On March 29, 2013, the Cowboys signed Romo to a six-year extension worth $108 million, with $55 million guaranteed and $25 million in bonuses, thus securing him for the rest of his career and relieving the pressure from the salary cap, which was reported to have less than $25,000 space before the deal was struck. In the middle of April 2013, Romo underwent back surgery to remove a cyst. Although it was characterized as a minor procedure by the team, he would end up missing all of the mini-camp and organized team activities.

Romo opened the season with a 36–31 victory over the New York Giants, passing for 263 yards and two touchdowns. He briefly left the game with a rib injury, but returned after halftime and finished the game. During a Week 5 51–48 loss to the Denver Broncos, Romo passed for a franchise-record 506 passing yards, five touchdowns, and an interception. The game was a memorable back-and-forth shootout between the two teams with Romo and Peyton Manning at the helm. After Week 7, his 100th career start, Romo had thrown for 27,485 yards, the most by a quarterback in his first 100 starts since 1960.

During a narrow Week 16 24–23 victory over the Washington Redskins, with the Cowboys trailing in the fourth quarter and needing a win to keep its playoff hopes alive, Romo led the team to a touchdown drive with 1:08 remaining, with what was later diagnosed as a season-ending herniated disk injury. Head coach Jason Garrett would later say: "He might have had his finest hour … We talk about mental toughness, being your best, regardless of circumstances. Somehow, some way, he helped us win that ballgame."

Romo underwent back surgery on December 27, 2013, and was placed on injured reserve. Garrett announced Kyle Orton as the starting quarterback for the regular-season finale against the Philadelphia Eagles, which the Cowboys narrowly lost 24–22, to miss the playoffs for a fourth consecutive year. Romo finished the 2013 season with 3,828 passing yards, 31 passing touchdowns, and 10 interceptions. He was ranked 71st by his fellow players on the NFL Top 100 Players of 2014.

=== 2014 season ===
After a poor performance in the season opening 28–17 loss to the San Francisco 49ers, Romo and the Cowboys won six consecutive games, including back-to-back road games against the Tennessee Titans (26–10) and the St. Louis Rams (34–31). The Cowboys also defeated the defending champion Seattle Seahawks 30–23 on the road, becoming only the second team to win a road game against the Seahawks in the three seasons. During a Week 5 20–17 overtime victory over the Houston Texans, Romo pulled off a memorable escape from J. J. Watt's pursuit on a play that resulted in Romo throwing a 43-yard touchdown. Through those six wins, Romo had a 13:3 touchdown:interception ratio. During a Week 8 20–17 overtime loss to the Washington Redskins, Romo went down with a back injury after linebacker Keenan Robinson sacked him, with his knee going into Romo's back. After the game, it was revealed that Romo had two fractures in his transverse process. Romo missed the next game, a 28–17 loss to the Arizona Cardinals, but came back the next week and went on to lead the Cowboys to a 12–4 record and their first divisional title since 2009.

On December 21, Romo set the Cowboys team record for highest completion percentage in a game with 90%, completing 18-of-20 passes in a 42–7 blowout victory over the Indianapolis Colts. He set his personal best quarterback rating in a single game with 151.7. Romo's 133.7 passer rating in the month of December was the highest in NFL history. He was named NFC Offensive Player of the Month for December. Romo was also named to the Pro Bowl.

During the Wild Card Round of the playoffs, Romo led the Cowboys to a 24–20 comeback victory over the Detroit Lions after being down 17–7 at halftime. He was 19-of-31 for 293 yards with two touchdowns and no interceptions. In the Divisional Round, Romo and the Cowboys were defeated by the Green Bay Packers, 26–21. Romo was 15-of-19 for 191 yards with two touchdowns and no interceptions. Romo was involved in a controversial sequence in the fourth quarter of the game. Romo completed a 31-yard pass to Dez Bryant on a fourth-and-two play from the Packers' 32-yard line. Although he caught the ball with both feet down in bounds, Bryant bobbled the ball as he made an attempt to reach for the endzone. The officials initially ruled Bryant down at the one-yard line, but the call was overturned as an incomplete pass following a challenge from Packers head coach Mike McCarthy.

Romo led the NFL in completion percentage and passer rating en route to the NFC East title. He finished tied for 3rd in MVP voting. He was ranked 34th by his fellow players on the NFL Top 100 Players of 2015. He was the highest undrafted player on the year's list.

=== 2015 season ===
Romo started the 2015 season strong, throwing a game-winning pass to Jason Witten with seven seconds left in the Cowboys' season-opening 27–26 victory over the New York Giants. Romo finished the game completing 36-of-45 passes for 356 yards, three touchdowns, and two interceptions. He continued to show success in the next game against the Philadelphia Eagles, but suffered a broken left collarbone during the third quarter of the 20–10 road victory after being sacked by linebacker Jordan Hicks. The injury sidelined Romo for eight weeks, during which the Cowboys failed to win a single game with Brandon Weeden and then Matt Cassel as starting quarterback.

Romo returned to the starting lineup in a Week 11 game against the Miami Dolphins. Despite throwing two interceptions, he completed 18 of 28 passes for 227 yards and two touchdowns in a 24–14 victory, ending the Cowboys' seven-game losing streak.

The Cowboys then faced the 10–0 Carolina Panthers in a Week 12 Thanksgiving game. Although up against an undefeated team and holding a 3–7 record, the Romo-led Cowboys were favored to win and remained in playoff contention. However, Romo threw three interceptions in the first half, two of which were returned for touchdowns, helping the Panthers take a 23–3 lead. At the end of the third quarter, Romo re-injured his left collarbone after getting sacked by linebacker Thomas Davis, ending his season. Romo remained on the active roster until December 21, when he was placed on injured reserve after the Cowboys dropped to 4–10 and were eliminated from playoff contention.

=== 2016 season ===
Romo was unable to start in the 2016 regular season after suffering a compression fracture to the L1 vertebra in his back during the third preseason game against the Seattle Seahawks. The injury caused Romo to miss the first 10 games of the season, with the duties of the team's starting quarterback being assumed by rookie Dak Prescott.

Although Cowboys owner Jerry Jones initially said Romo would remain the team's starter when he returned, Prescott's success with the team and the length of Romo's injury led to Jones reconsidering his decision. Amid Prescott guiding the team to an eight-game winning streak from Week 2 to Week 10, Romo conceded his role as starting quarterback to Prescott and began serving as the Cowboys' backup when he returned to the active roster in Week 11. Romo made his season debut in the regular-season finale on January 1, 2017, against the Philadelphia Eagles. In what would prove to be the final play of his career, Romo threw a three-yard touchdown to Terrance Williams before Mark Sanchez played for the rest of the 27–13 road loss.

=== Retirement ===
On April 4, 2017, Romo announced his retirement from the NFL. After announcing his retirement, Romo was released by the Cowboys, per his request. Following his retirement, Dallas Mavericks owner Mark Cuban announced that Romo would be a "Maverick for a day" for the Mavericks' final home game of their 2016–17 season. He warmed up with the team and sat in full uniform on the bench, but did not play in the game and was not considered an official member of the roster.

== Career statistics ==
Legend
	Led the league
**Bold**	Career high

=== NFL ===
==== Regular season ====
Year	Team	Games			Passing									Rushing					Sacks		Fumbles	
Year	Team	GP	GS	Record	Cmp	Att	Pct	Yds	Avg	Lng	TD	Int	Rtg	Att	Yds	Avg	Lng	TD	Sck	SckY	Fum	Lost
2003	DAL	0	0	—	DNP																	
2004	DAL	6	0	—	0	0	0.0	0	0.0	0	0	0	0.0	0	0	0.0	0	0	0	0	0	0
2005	DAL	16	0	—	0	0	0.0	0	0.0	0	0	0	0.0	2	−2	−1.0	−1	0	0	0	0	0
2006	DAL	16	10	6–4	220	337	65.3	2,903	**8.6**	56T	19	13	95.1	**34**	102	3.0	16	0	21	124	9	3
2007	DAL	16	16	**13–3**	335	520	64.4	4,211	8.1	59T	**36**	**19**	97.4	31	**129**	4.2	17	**2**	24	176	10	2
2008	DAL	13	13	8–5	276	450	61.3	3,448	7.7	75T	26	14	91.4	28	41	1.5	15	0	20	123	**13**	**7**
2009	DAL	16	16	11–5	347	550	63.1	4,483	8.2	80T	26	9	97.6	35	105	3.0	17	1	34	196	6	4
2010	DAL	6	6	1–5	148	213	69.5	1,605	7.5	69T	11	7	94.9	6	38	**6.3**	14	0	7	41	0	0
2011	DAL	16	16	8–8	346	522	66.3	4,184	8.0	77	31	10	102.5	22	46	2.1	17	1	**36**	227	6	3
2012	DAL	16	16	8–8	**425**	**648**	65.6	**4,903**	7.6	**85T**	28	**19**	90.5	30	49	1.6	15	1	**36**	263	6	3
2013	DAL	15	15	8–7	342	535	63.9	3,828	7.2	82T	31	10	96.7	20	38	1.9	15	0	35	**272**	4	1
2014	DAL	15	15	12–3	304	435	69.9	3,705	8.5	68T	34	9	113.2	26	61	2.3	**21**	0	29	215	7	3
2015	DAL	4	4	3–1	83	121	68.6	884	7.3	39	5	7	79.4	4	13	3.2	12	0	6	35	1	1
2016	DAL	1	0	—	3	4	**75.0**	29	7.3	16	1	0	**134.4**	0	0	0.0	0	0	0	0	0	0
Career		156	127	78–49	2,829	4,335	65.3	34,183	7.9	85T	248	117	97.1	238	620	2.6	21	5	248	1,672	62	27

==== Postseason ====
Year	Team	Games			Passing									Rushing					Sacks		Fumbles	
Year	Team	GP	GS	Record	Cmp	Att	Pct	Yds	Avg	Lng	TD	Int	Rtg	Att	Yds	Avg	Lng	TD	Sck	SckY	Fum	Lost
2003	DAL	0	0	—	DNP																	
2006	DAL	1	1	0–1	17	29	58.6	189	6.5	32	1	0	89.6	1	0	0.0	0	0	2	21	2	0
2007	DAL	1	1	0–1	18	36	50.0	201	5.6	20	1	**1**	64.7	**3**	**17**	**5.7**	**11**	0	2	19	0	0
2009	DAL	2	2	**1–1**	**45**	**70**	64.3	442	6.3	36	2	**1**	85.5	**3**	4	1.3	5	0	8	58	**3**	**2**
2014	DAL	2	2	**1–1**	34	50	**68.0**	**484**	**9.7**	**76T**	**4**	0	**125.8**	**3**	5	1.7	7	0	**10**	**72**	**3**	0
2016	DAL	0	0	—	DNP																	
Career		6	6	2–4	114	185	61.6	1,316	7.1	76T	8	2	93.0	10	26	2.6	11	0	22	170	6	2

=== College ===
Season	Team	Games		Passing							
Season	Team	GP	GS	Cmp	Att	Pct	Yds	Y/A	TD	Int	Rtg
2000	Eastern Illinois	11	11	164	278	59.0	2,583	9.3	27	12	160.5
2001	Eastern Illinois	10	10	138	207	**66.7**	2,068	**10.0**	21	6	**178.3**
2002	Eastern Illinois	12	12	**258**	**407**	63.4	**3,165**	7.8	**34**	**16**	148.4
Career		33	33	560	892	62.8	7,816	8.8	82	34	159.1

== Career highlights ==
=== Awards and honors ===
NFL

- 4× Pro Bowl selection (2006, 2007, 2009, 2014)
- Second-team All Pro (2014)
- NFC passing yards leader (2009)
- NFC passing touchdowns leader (2007)
- NFL passer rating leader (2014)
- NFL completion percentage leader (2014)
- Total quarterback rating leader: (2014)
- 2× NFC passer rating leader (2007, 2014)
- 3× FedEx Air Player of the Week (Week 1, 2007, Week 13, 2007, Week 5, 2013)
- 2× NFC Offensive Player of the Month
- Ed Block Courage Award (2011)
- Ranked No. 72 in the Top 100 Players of 2011
- Ranked No. 91 in the Top 100 Players of 2012
- Ranked No. 71 in the Top 100 Players of 2014
- Ranked No. 34 in the Top 100 Players of 2015

College

- 3× All-OVC (2000–2002)
- 3× OVC Player of the Year (2000–2002)
- 3× All-American (2000–2002)
- Walter Payton Award (2002)

=== Records ===
==== NFL records ====
- Most consecutive road games with at least one touchdown pass: 41 (2009–2016)
- Most games in a season with a passer rating of at least 135.0 (6)

==== Dallas Cowboys records ====
===== Career =====
- Games with at least 300 yards passing: 46; previously held by Troy Aikman (13)
- Most fourth quarter comebacks/game-winning drives: 28; previously held by Roger Staubach (23)
- Consecutive games with a touchdown pass: 38 (2012–2014)

===== Season =====
- Games with at least 300 yards passing: 9 (2012)
- Passing yards: 4,903 (2012); first Cowboys' quarterback to throw for more than 4,000 yards in a season (2007, 2009, 2011, 2012)
- Attempts: 611 (2012); previously held by Romo (550–2009)
- First quarterback in franchise history to average over 300 passing yards a game in a season (306.4 – 2012)

===== Game =====
- On December 21, 2014, Romo completed a team record 90.0% of his passes (18 of 20) in a home game against the Indianapolis Colts.
- Most passing yards in a game, 506 yards against the Denver Broncos on October 6, 2013.

== Broadcasting career ==
Following his retirement from the NFL, Romo was hired by CBS Sports to serve as the lead color analyst for the network's NFL telecasts, working in the booth alongside play-by-play announcer Jim Nantz, replacing Phil Simms, who was moved to the studio for The NFL Today.

While Romo's retirement and hiring as a broadcaster occurred without controversy, critics questioned his immediate ascension to the number-one position ahead of veterans such as Dan Fouts, Trent Green and Rich Gannon. None of the former players and coaches in a lead position on the other networks at the time (Troy Aikman, Cris Collinsworth and Jon Gruden) started his broadcasting career in the lead position. Simms jokingly asked Romo "How does that seat feel?" during Week 1 of The NFL Today.

When the 2017 NFL season began, Romo received critical praise for his work, most notably for his ability to predict offensive plays and read defensive formations, and "adding an enthusiasm that had been lacking with Simms".

Romo and Nantz received further acclaim for their broadcasting of the 2018 AFC Championship Game between the Kansas City Chiefs and the New England Patriots, as "Nantz continually set Romo up to make his predictions and analysis prior to the snap", and some suggested that Chiefs head coach Andy Reid "could have used Romo on his defensive staff, because the former quarterback knew just about every play the Patriots were going to run down the stretch". According to The Guardian, the "beauty of Romo's analysis is that it feels like he's in on the fun with you". That season, Romo and Nantz called Super Bowl LIII in Atlanta.

The New Yorker has called Romo a "genius of football commentary". Romo has received praise from other prominent sports commentators, including Bob Costas and Dick Vitale.

In February 2020, Romo renewed his contract with CBS through 2030 for a sum of $17 million per year, making him the highest-paid NFL analyst in television history.

Romo began to face increased criticism of his broadcasting ability during the 2021 NFL season. He was criticized for excessive talking, recounting confusing stories and confusion during crucial parts of games. The New York Post reported that following the season, CBS staged an intervention, believing that Romo's analysis had begun to regress. Multiple CBS executives met with Romo to discuss their concerns that he was not preparing adequately to call games and that his chemistry with Nantz had declined.

Criticism of Romo's broadcasting increased further during Romo's sixth year as the lead color commentator for CBS. According to Front Office Sports, Romo's analysis during the 2022 season was insane, obvious and at times made little sense. He was said to be shouting at viewers, uttering odd vocalizations and talking excessively during the broadcast. Romo's ability to correctly predict plays was perceived to have become increasingly rare. Some have speculated that Romo's time away from the game on the field is responsible for the perceived decline in his broadcasting ability.

Romo provided color commentary for Super Bowl LVIII alongside Nantz. Romo's performance was widely ridiculed, particularly for talking over Nantz's call of the game-winning touchdown catch by Mecole Hardman. Romo was also criticized for singing the Adele song "Rolling in the Deep" and the Elvis Presley song "Viva Las Vegas" while the game entered a commercial break.

On October 2, 2026, CBS Sports and Romo mutually agreed to part ways, after Romo was arrested for operating while intoxicated in July.

=== Endorsements ===
In 2018, Romo filled the vacancy of Jon Gruden in Corona's "Corona Hotline" commercials. Romo has maintained his recurring position in the series of advertisements, and many of the television ad spots feature his fantasy football advice.

== Philanthropy ==
Romo has hosted an annual youth football camp in Burlington, Wisconsin since 2004. In the Dallas area, Romo participated in community activities in collaboration with United Way, the Make-A-Wish Foundation and the Society for the Prevention of Cruelty to Animals.

== Personal life ==
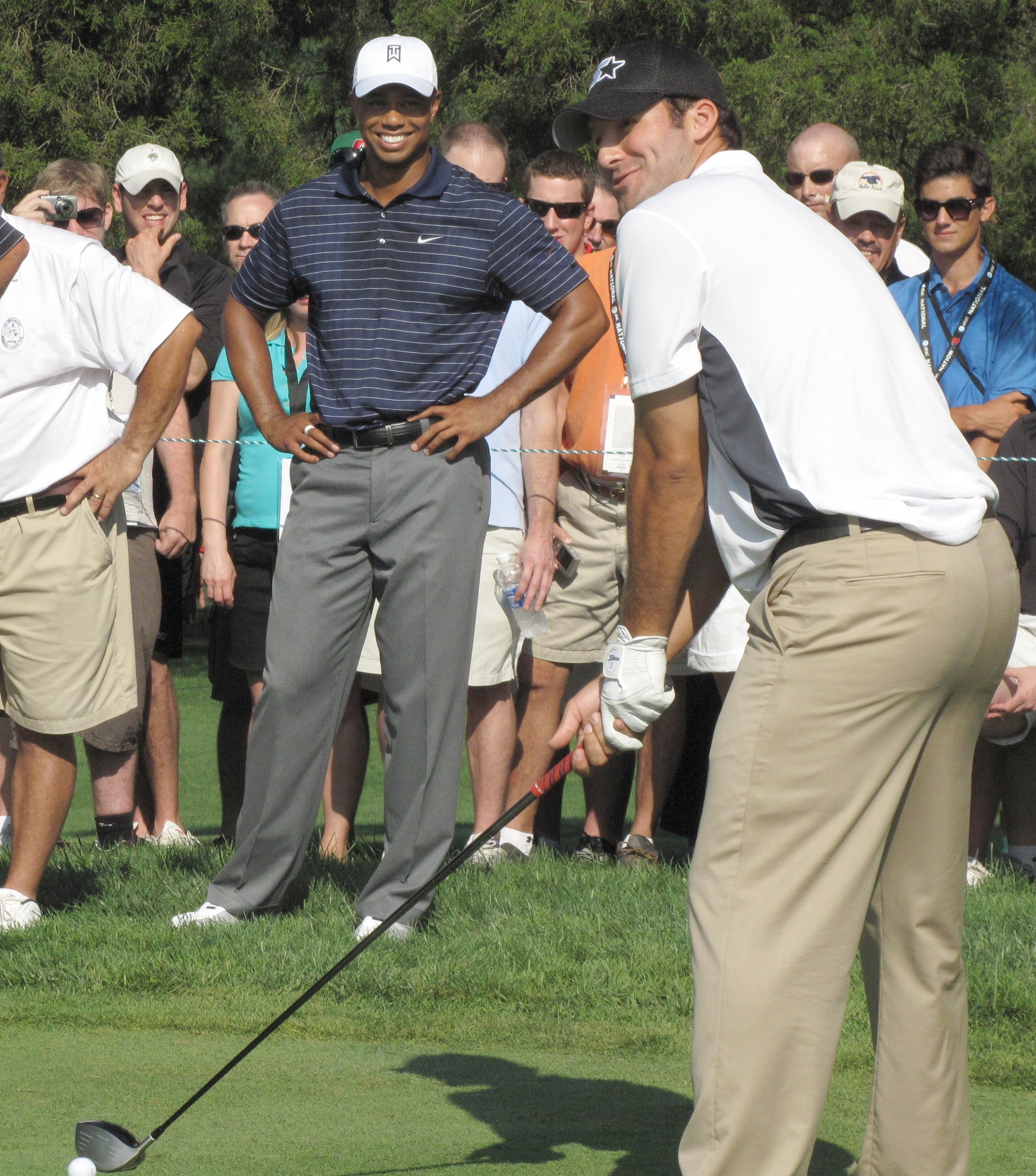
Romo with Tiger Woods at the AT&T National in 2009

In November 2007, Romo began dating American singer and actress Jessica Simpson. On December 16, 2007, Simpson attended a Dallas Cowboys game at Texas Stadium in which Romo performed poorly in the loss to the Philadelphia Eagles. Controversy erupted before the Cowboys' playoff loss to the New York Giants when pictures surfaced of Romo (along with teammates Jason Witten and Bobby Carpenter) at a resort in Cabo San Lucas with Simpson during the Cowboys' bye week before playing the Giants. On July 13, 2009, People reported that Romo and Simpson ended their relationship on July 9, 2009, the night before her 29th birthday.

On May 28, 2011, Romo married Candice Crawford, the 2008 Miss Missouri USA, a former journalist for Dallas television station KDAF and the sister of actor Chace Crawford. They had dated since the summer of 2009 and became engaged on December 16, 2010. The couple have three sons together, born in 2012, 2014 and 2017.

Romo is an avid amateur golfer and unsuccessfully attempted to qualify for the 2004 EDS Byron Nelson Championship and the 2005 U.S. Open. He again failed to make the cut in qualifying for the Byron Nelson tournament in 2008. In February 2018, it was announced that Romo had received a sponsor's exemption to play in the PGA Tour's Corales Puntacana Resort and Club Championship in Punta Cana, Dominican Republic from March 22–25. He missed the cut with scores of 77 and 82, finishing last in the 132-man field after the second round. In July 2018, Romo won the American Century Championship, a celebrity tournament. Tiger Woods has described Romo and John Smoltz as the best celebrity golfers with whom he has played.

Romo is a Christian and has spoken about his faith, saying, "My faith has grown and I found that always having Jesus makes things a lot easier in my life. Having Jesus in your life gives you everlasting peace, which never goes away. It helps you handle the ups and downs of professional football."

On July 23, 2026, Romo was arrested on suspicion of operating while intoxicated (OWI) in Milwaukee, Wisconsin. On July 31, CBS Sports indefinitely suspended Romo, with J. J. Watt tapped as his replacement for NFL broadcasts. On September 1, Romo pleaded no contest to the OWI charge. As a result, his driving privileges were revoked for six months. On October 2, CBS announced that Romo and the network had "mutually agreed to part ways".

== See also ==
- List of 500-yard passing games in the NFL
- List of most consecutive games with touchdown passes in the NFL

Sporting positions
Preceded by Phil Simms	NFL on CBS lead analyst 2017–2025	Succeeded by J. J. Watt
Preceded by Phil Simms	Super Bowl television color commentator (AFC package carrier); 2018–2023	Succeeded by TBA
