= Marengo Community High School =

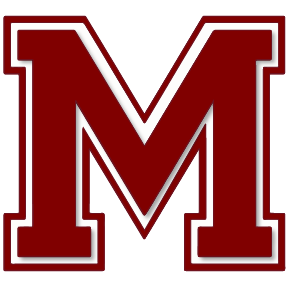

Location
- 110 Franks Road; Marengo, Illinois; United States
- Coordinates: 42.2434°N 88.5877°W

Information
- School district: 154
- Principal: Angela Fink
- Teaching staff: 48.33 (FTE)
- Grades: 9-12
- Enrollment: 689 (2023-2024)
- Student to teacher ratio: 14.26
- Color
- Mascot: Indian
- Website: www.mchs154.org

Marengo Community High School is a public high school located in southwestern McHenry County, Illinois, that serves the communities of Marengo and Union, as well as the surrounding rural areas. The school has an enrollment of approximately 800 students.

The softball team won the IHSA Class 3A state championship in 2017.

== Notable alumni ==
- Ken Dunek, former NFL and USFL tight end
