= Burlington, Wisconsin =

- City
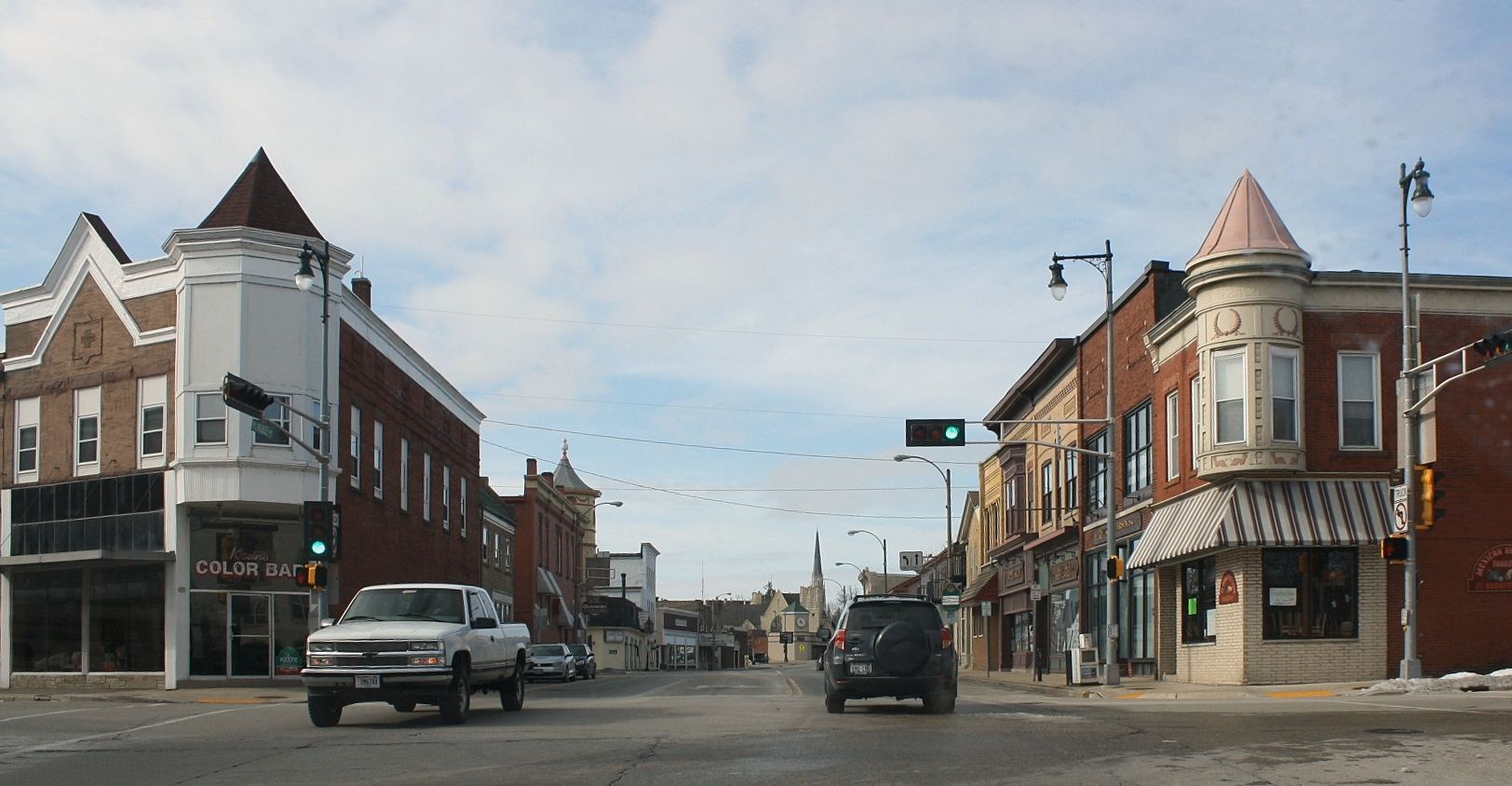
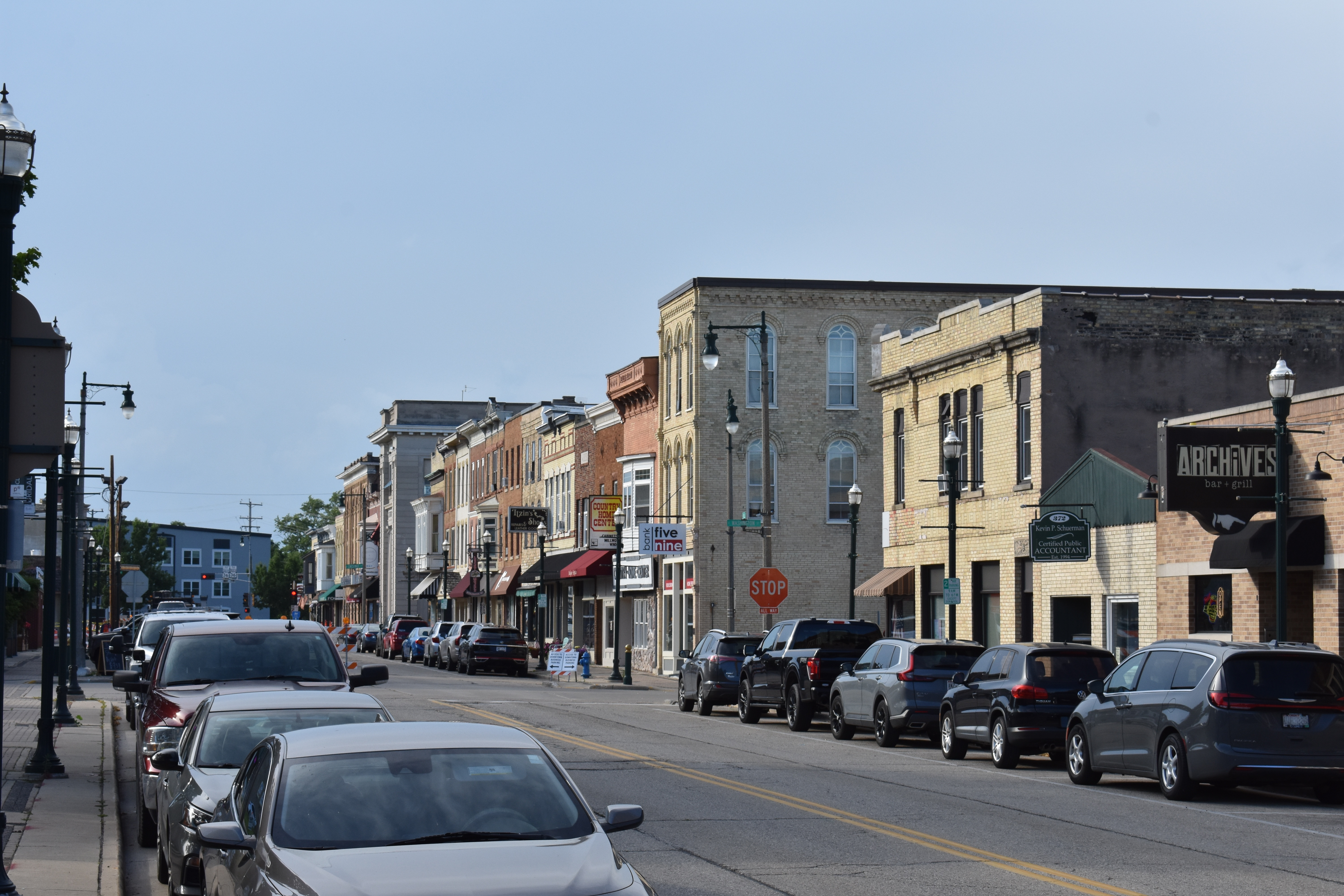
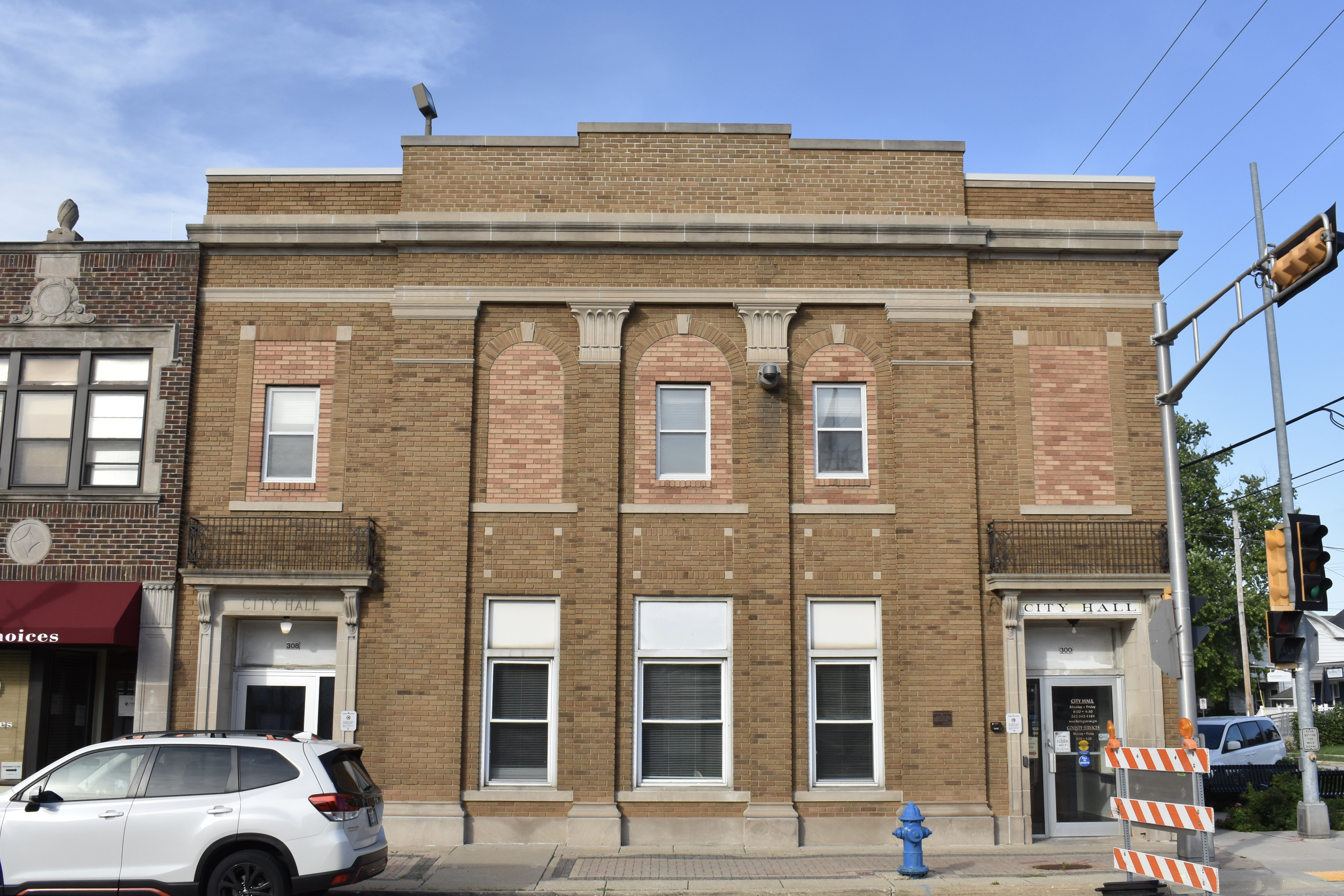
- Downtown Burlington Pine Street City Hall
- Nicknames: Chocolate City, U.S.A.
- Motto: The town with Tall Tales
- Location of Burlington in Racine and Walworth counties, Wisconsin

- Location within Wisconsin Location within the United States
- Coordinates: 42°40′40″N 88°16′41″W
- Country: United States
- State: Wisconsin
- County: Racine, Walworth
- Incorporated (village): 1886
- Incorporated (city): 1900
- Named for: Burlington, Vermont

Government
  - Type: Mayor–council
  - Mayor: Jon Schultz
  - Administrator: Carina Walters
  - Common council: 8 aldermen from 4 districts

Area
  - Total: 7.97 sq mi (20.64 km^{2})
  - Land: 7.71 sq mi (19.98 km^{2})
  - Water: 0.25 sq mi (0.65 km^{2}) 2.98%

Population (2020)
  - Total: 11,047
  - Density: 1,423.1/sq mi (549.48/km^{2})
- Time zone: UTC-6 (CST)
  - Summer (DST): UTC-5 (CDT)
- ZIP Code: 53105
- Area code: 262
- FIPS code: 55-11200
- Website: www.burlington-wi.gov

Burlington is a city in Racine and Walworth counties in the U.S. state of Wisconsin, with the majority of the city located in Racine County. The population of the city was 11,047 as of the 2020 census.

== History ==
Prior to the arrival of Europeans in the area, Native American mounds were constructed near the present location of Burlington. A small Potawatomi village stood in what became Burlington.

The earliest certain European presence in what became Burlington was in the fall of 1799, when a group of French explorers and missionaries led by Francis Morgan de Vereceones made a portage from the Root River to the Fox River, reaching the Fox at approximately Burlington's present location.

The first European settlers in Burlington were Moses Smith (the son of a Revolutionary War veteran) and William Whiting. Smith and Whiting had been in the area previously, making a so-called "jackknife claim" to the land (carving their names and the date on trees in the vicinity) on December 15, 1835. The men then left the encampment and returned with Lemuel Smith (Moses' brother) as well as Benjamin Perce, another member of the group. The four men searched for arable land and built a cabin on the east side of the Fox River (on what is now Wehmhoff-Jucker Park.) Other settlers arrived in the spring and summer of 1836, mostly from New England; they named their settlement Foxville. That year, the residents of Foxville unanimously decided to change their settlement's name to "Burlington" after the city Burlington, Vermont; the Foxville name continued to be used, however, until that name was officially changed on July 15, 1839.

Since its establishment, Foxville had been in Michigan Territory. On July 3, 1836, however, an act of Congress organizing the Wisconsin Territory went into effect, and Foxville fell within the borders of Milwaukee County, Wisconsin Territory, which at that time included the present-day county of Racine. The two counties separated on December 7, 1836, and Foxville ended up in Racine County. The first post office in Foxville was created on March 21, 1837, with Moses Smith, one of the four founders of the city, as the first postmaster. In May 1837, a sawmill (the first frame building in the settlement) and a dam on the Fox River were completed.

On January 2, 1838, Rochester township, which included Foxville as well as all of Racine County west of Mount Pleasant, was established. On March 9, 1839, Burlington township (including at the time what is now the Town of Dover) and much of Brighton were separated from Rochester.

Settlers were part of a wave of New England farmers who headed west into what was then the wilds of the Northwest Territory during the early 1800s. Most of them arrived as a result of the completion of the Erie Canal. When they originally arrived in the area, there was nothing but dense virgin forest and wild prairie. The settlers laid out farms, constructed roads, erected government buildings and established post routes. They brought with them many of their "Yankee" New England values, such as staunch support for abolitionism as well as a passion for education and the subsequent construction of many schools. They were mostly members of the Congregationalist Church, though some were Episcopalian. Due to the second Great Awakening some of them had converted to Methodism before moving to what is now Burlington. Burlington, like much of Wisconsin, would be culturally similar to early New England for most of its early history.

Burlington was incorporated as a village in 1886; in 1900 it became a city.

== Geography and climate ==
According to the United States Census Bureau, the city has a total area of 7.73 square miles (20.02 km^{2}), of which 7.50 square miles (19.42 km^{2}) is land and 0.23 square miles (0.60 km^{2}) is water.

Burlington is located at 42°40′40″N 88°16′41″W (42.677945, −88.278279).

Climate data for Burlington, Wisconsin (1991–2020 normals, extremes 1951–present)
Month	Jan	Feb	Mar	Apr	May	Jun	Jul	Aug	Sep	Oct	Nov	Dec	Year
Record high °F (°C)	60 (16)	73 (23)	82 (28)	90 (32)	94 (34)	102 (39)	105 (41)	102 (39)	101 (38)	90 (32)	76 (24)	67 (19)	105 (41)
Mean maximum °F (°C)	48.7 (9.3)	51.5 (10.8)	66.8 (19.3)	78.0 (25.6)	85.7 (29.8)	90.6 (32.6)	91.7 (33.2)	90.4 (32.4)	87.2 (30.7)	79.9 (26.6)	64.9 (18.3)	52.0 (11.1)	94.1 (34.5)
Mean daily maximum °F (°C)	27.7 (−2.4)	31.4 (−0.3)	42.7 (5.9)	55.7 (13.2)	67.1 (19.5)	76.9 (24.9)	81.0 (27.2)	79.5 (26.4)	72.9 (22.7)	60.0 (15.6)	45.2 (7.3)	32.9 (0.5)	56.1 (13.4)
Daily mean °F (°C)	19.6 (−6.9)	22.7 (−5.2)	33.1 (0.6)	44.1 (6.7)	55.8 (13.2)	65.8 (18.8)	70.2 (21.2)	68.6 (20.3)	61.2 (16.2)	49.3 (9.6)	36.4 (2.4)	25.4 (−3.7)	46.1 (7.8)
Mean daily minimum °F (°C)	11.5 (−11.4)	14.0 (−10.0)	23.4 (−4.8)	33.7 (0.9)	44.4 (6.9)	54.7 (12.6)	59.3 (15.2)	57.7 (14.3)	49.5 (9.7)	38.6 (3.7)	27.6 (−2.4)	17.9 (−7.8)	36.0 (2.2)
Mean minimum °F (°C)	−10.1 (−23.4)	−5.6 (−20.9)	5.5 (−14.7)	21.4 (−5.9)	31.1 (−0.5)	41.9 (5.5)	48.5 (9.2)	47.8 (8.8)	36.2 (2.3)	25.2 (−3.8)	12.7 (−10.7)	−2.0 (−18.9)	−13.9 (−25.5)
Record low °F (°C)	−27 (−33)	−27 (−33)	−15 (−26)	3 (−16)	22 (−6)	32 (0)	39 (4)	39 (4)	23 (−5)	15 (−9)	−9 (−23)	−18 (−28)	−27 (−33)
Average precipitation inches (mm)	1.82 (46)	1.76 (45)	2.08 (53)	3.59 (91)	3.96 (101)	4.51 (115)	3.59 (91)	3.55 (90)	3.46 (88)	2.75 (70)	2.38 (60)	1.88 (48)	35.33 (897)
Average snowfall inches (cm)	12.1 (31)	9.7 (25)	4.9 (12)	1.1 (2.8)	0.0 (0.0)	0.0 (0.0)	0.0 (0.0)	0.0 (0.0)	0.0 (0.0)	0.0 (0.0)	2.2 (5.6)	7.7 (20)	37.7 (96)
Average precipitation days (≥ 0.01 in)	9.0	7.5	9.0	11.5	12.3	10.9	9.1	9.9	8.9	9.7	9.0	8.9	115.7
Average snowy days (≥ 0.1 in)	6.0	4.5	2.3	0.7	0.0	0.0	0.0	0.0	0.0	0.0	1.3	4.3	19.1
Source: NOAA

== Demographics ==
Historical population
Census	Pop.	Note	%±
1860	993		—
1870	1,589		60.0%
1880	1,611		1.4%
1890	2,043		26.8%
1900	2,256		10.4%
1910	3,212		42.4%
1920	3,626		12.9%
1930	4,114		13.5%
1940	4,414		7.3%
1950	4,780		8.3%
1960	5,856		22.5%
1970	7,479		27.7%
1980	8,385		12.1%
1990	8,855		5.6%
2000	9,936		12.2%
2010	10,464		5.3%
2020	11,047		5.6%
Source: U.S. Census

=== 2020 census ===
As of the 2020 census, Burlington had a population of 11,047. The median age was 40.0 years. 22.8% of residents were under the age of 18 and 18.8% of residents were 65 years of age or older. For every 100 females there were 96.0 males, and for every 100 females age 18 and over there were 93.2 males age 18 and over.

99.7% of residents lived in urban areas, while 0.3% lived in rural areas.

There were 4,521 households in Burlington, of which 28.7% had children under the age of 18 living in them. Of all households, 45.9% were married-couple households, 18.0% were households with a male householder and no spouse or partner present, and 27.9% were households with a female householder and no spouse or partner present. About 30.6% of all households were made up of individuals and 14.3% had someone living alone who was 65 years of age or older.

There were 4,698 housing units, of which 3.8% were vacant. The homeowner vacancy rate was 0.9% and the rental vacancy rate was 2.9%.

Racial composition as of the 2020 census
Race	Number	Percent
White	9,632	87.2%
Black or African American	115	1.0%
American Indian and Alaska Native	38	0.3%
Asian	113	1.0%
Native Hawaiian and Other Pacific Islander	8	0.1%
Some other race	352	3.2%
Two or more races	789	7.1%
Hispanic or Latino (of any race)	1,098	9.9%

=== 2010 census ===
As of the census of 2010, there were 10,464 people, 4,240 households, and 2,702 families residing in the city. The population density was 1,395.2 inhabitants per square mile (538.7/km^{2}). There were 4,529 housing units at an average density of 603.9 units per square mile (233.2 units/km^{2}). The racial makeup of the city was 92.8% White, 0.9% African American, 0.4% Native American, 1.1% Asian, 3.4% from other races, and 1.5% from two or more races. Hispanic or Latino of any race were 8.6% of the population.

There were 4,240 households, of which 32.8% had children under the age of 18 living with them, 47.4% were married couples living together, 11.5% had a female householder with no husband present, 4.8% had a male householder with no wife present, and 36.3% were non-families. 30.3% of all households were made up of individuals, and 12.9% had someone living alone who was 65 years of age or older. The average household size was 2.43 and the average family size was 3.03.

The median age in the city was 38.6 years. 25.4% of residents were under the age of 18; 7.9% were between the ages of 18 and 24; 25.5% were from 25 to 44; 26.2% were from 45 to 64; and 15% were 65 years of age or older. The gender makeup of the city was 47.7% male and 52.3% female.

=== 2000 census ===
As of the census of 2000, there were 9,936 people, 3,838 households, and 2,590 families residing in the city. The population density was 1,667.9 people per square mile (644.0 people/km^{2}). There were 3,976 housing units at an average density of 667.4 units per square mile (257.7 units/km^{2}). The racial makeup of the city was 95.89% White, 0.37% Black or African American, 0.12% Native American, 0.55% Asian, 2.21% from other races, and 0.85% from two or more races. Hispanic or Latino of any race were 4.65% of the population.

There were 1,838 households, out of which 36.3% had children under the age of 18 living with them, 52.8% were married couples living together, 10.4% had a female householder with no husband present, and 32.5% were non-families. 27.5% of all households were made up of individuals, and 10.9% had someone living alone who was 65 years of age or older. The average household size was 2.52 and the average family size was 3.10.

In the city, the population was spread out, with 27.8% under the age of 18, 9.0% from 18 to 24, 29.5% from 25 to 44, 19.8% from 45 to 64, and 13.9% who were 65 years of age or older. The median age was 35 years. For every 100 females, there were 92.4 males. For every 100 females age 18 and over, there were 87.6 males.

The median income for a household in the city was $43,365, and the median income for a family was $54,045. Males had a median income of $38,471 versus $25,082 for females. The per capita income for the city was $21,789. About 3.7% of families and 5.1% of the population were below the poverty line, including 5.2% of those under age 18 and 4.7% of those age 65 or over.

== Government ==
Burlington has a mayor-council form of government, with a city administrator. The mayor is the city's chief executive, responsible for seeing that state law and city ordinances are enforced. Mayors are elected to two-year terms; the current mayor is Jon Schultz.

The Common Council is composed of eight aldermen, two in each of Burlington's four districts. In every year's spring election, one alderman is elected from each district. Aldermen serve two-year terms.

The city administrator is appointed by the Common Council to oversee the routine operations of the city.

As of 2018, the Burlington Police Department employed 17 full-time officers. As of 2020, the Fire Department employed firefighters/EMT's to staff the station full-time, and had over 30 volunteer firefighters/EMT's.

== Education ==
The first school classes in Burlington were taught in 1838. One of the first teachers was William P. Lyon, later a Justice of the Supreme Court of Wisconsin. The settlement's first schoolhouse was built in 1839, and classes were taught there irregularly for the next 15 years. An act of the Wisconsin Legislature in 1857 incorporated the Burlington Union School District of Racine County. In 1858 and 1859, a schoolhouse was built for the district's use. Now called Lincoln School (Burlington, Wisconsin), the building is now used as the headquarters for the Burlington Area School District. Early quarrels about the management and costs of the school led to the creation of two rival school boards, each claiming to be legal; a new board gained control in 1861, and lasting stability came to the system in 1872.

Burlington is served by the Burlington Area School District. The district has seven schools. Elementary schools include: Cooper Montessori, Dyer Elementary, Waller Elementary, and Winkler Elementary. The community is served by Karcher Middle School and Burlington High School . A campus of the Gateway Technical College is also in Burlington.

=== Private and parochial schools ===
Burlington's first private school, the Burlington Academy, was founded in 1844 as a result of dissatisfaction with the other schools operating at the time. One of its early teachers was John F. Potter, later a Congressman from Wisconsin.

== Culture ==
The Malt House Theater, along the Fox River in Burlington, is home to the community theater company Haylofters, which has been in continuous operation since 1932.

== Media ==
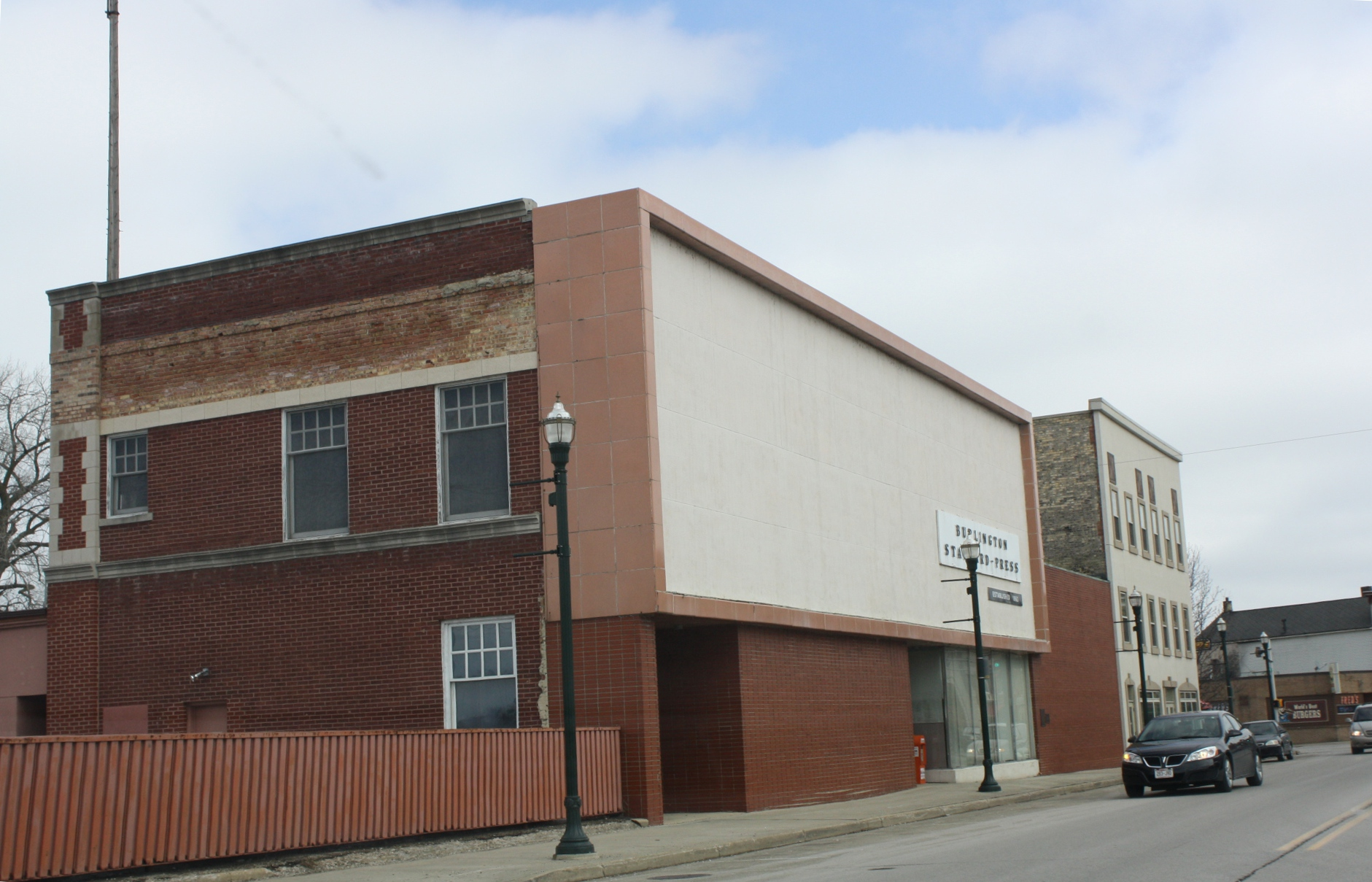
Burlington Standard Press building

=== Newspapers ===
The first newspaper in the Burlington area was the Voree Herald, published in Voree in January 1846 by James Strang, the leader of the Church of Jesus Christ of Latter Day Saints (Strangite). Its primary purpose was to inform his congregation about events in the wider Latter Day Saint movement. The paper was renamed the Gospel Herald in September 1847, and continued to be published until 1850, when most of the church relocated to Beaver Island in Lake Michigan.

The first newspaper published in Burlington intended for a general audience was the Weekly Burlington Gazette, first published on April 8, 1858. The newspaper was strongly Republican and continued until December 11, 1860, when its owner moved to Houston, Texas.

From 1860 until 1863, no newspaper was published in Burlington. On October 14, 1863, the Burlington Standard, another Republican newspaper, was founded. In 1881, the paper became largely nonpartisan, but in April 1886, with a new owner, the paper was renamed the Standard Democrat and became strongly pro-Democrat. From 1896 to 1911, the Standard Democrat was also published in German under the name Der Standard Demokrat.

The Burlington Democrat, a newspaper with Democratic leanings, was first published in 1880 as a counter to the Republican Burlington Standard. Its name was soon changed to the Burlington Free Press, and its leanings changed to Republican at about the same time the Standard became the Standard Democrat.

The weekly Burlington Standard Press is currently published in Burlington; the daily Racine Journal Times, Kenosha News, and Milwaukee Journal Sentinel are also available in the area.

=== Radio ===
WBSD (89.1 FM) is a high school radio station owned by the Burlington Area School District and operated by the staff and students of Burlington High School. Burlington is also served by radio stations WIIL (95.1 FM) and WLKG (96.1 FM), as well as stations from Milwaukee and Racine.

=== Television ===
Around 1989 Win-TV (now WIN Media, Inc. - ) was created. According to their web site they began as a producer of local news and sports programming televised throughout Southeastern Wisconsin on CNN Headline News. Since then their services have expanded to include an array of multimedia services for their clients.

== Transportation ==
=== Railroads ===
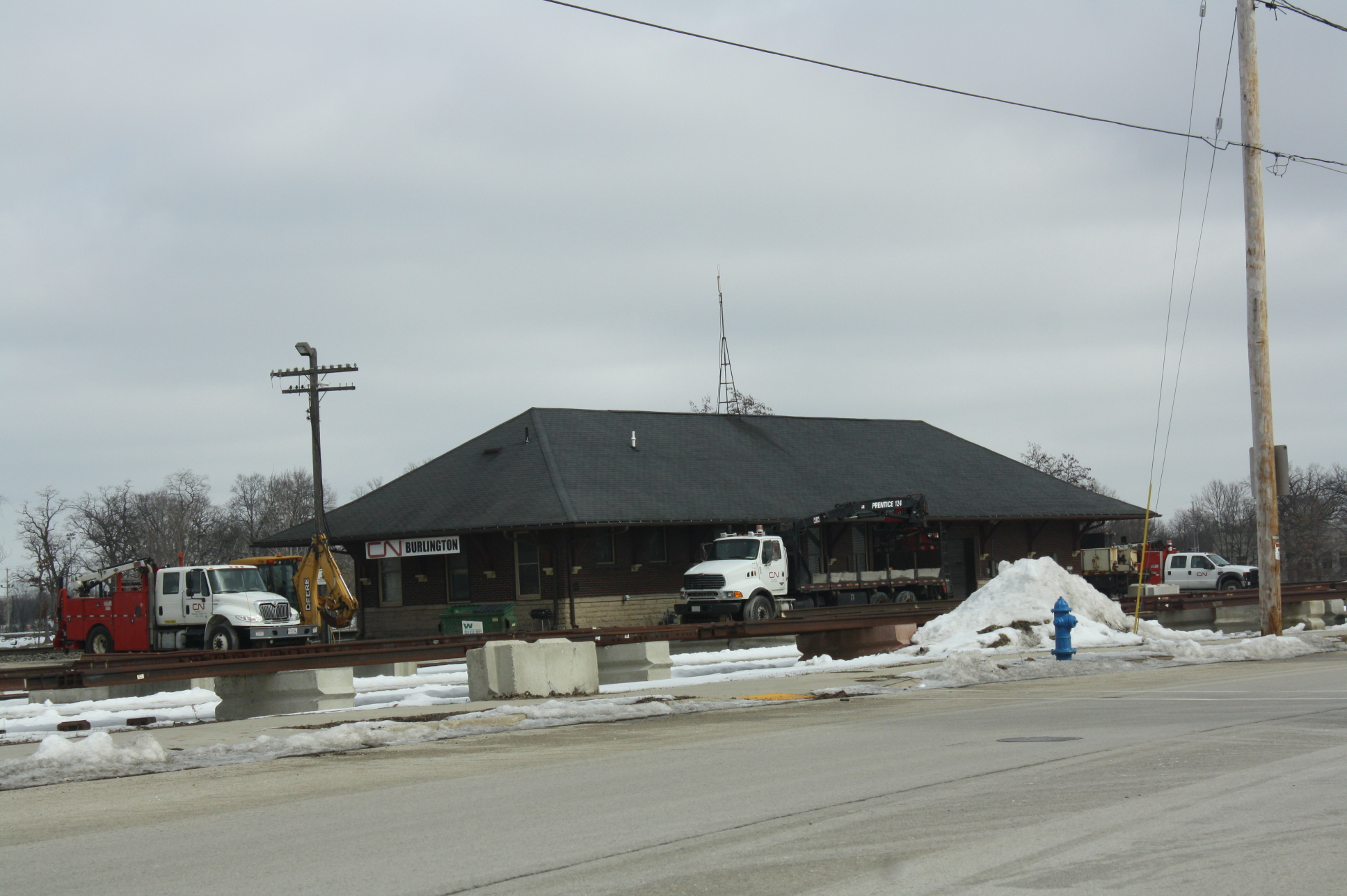
Train station

The first railroad to pass through Burlington was built in 1855 by the Racine, Janesville and Mississippi Railroad Company. Its construction nearly bankrupted Racine. The line was later reorganized as the Western Union Railroad and eventually incorporated into the Chicago, Milwaukee and St. Paul Railroad Company.

In 1856 Burlington invested in the Fox River Valley Railroad of Wisconsin, a planned railroad that would have started in Milwaukee, connected to the railroad already in Burlington, and continued on to the Fox River Valley Railroad of Illinois. The roadbed was built, but because of the failure of the company, rails were never laid.

=== Airport ===
Burlington Municipal Airport (KBUU) serves Burlington and surrounding communities.

== Notable people ==
- Alma M. Aldrich, Wisconsin State Representative
- Maurice L. Ayers, politician
- Caleb P. Barns, lawyer
- Charles Edward Barns, writer
- Ginger Beaumont, professional baseball player, 1st player to bat in a World Series(1903) vs Cy Young, Boston Pitcher. NL Batting Champion, Career .311 hitter. Beaumont Field in Burlington is named in his honor.
- Frank Cannella, sometimes referred to as the "father of the infomercial" industry
- William Everett Chipman, state senator
- Henry Allen Cooper, Congressman from Wisconsin's 1st congressional district
- Leander F. Frisby, lawyer
- Ed Garvey, lawyer, politician, executive director of the National Football League Players Association
- Jared Hornbeek, bassist/musician of alternative rock band, The Unlikely Candidates
- Gregory Itzin, the actor who portrays fictional president Charles Logan of TV's 24, was a former resident
- Kelly Kahl, television executive
- Bill Kazmaier, three-time World's Strongest Man winner; ESPN commentator on World's Strongest Man broadcasts
- John Longstreth, drummer of the technical death metal band Origin
- William P. Lyon, Justice of the Wisconsin Supreme Court
- Paul Miller, MLB player
- George C. Mathews, member of first Securities and Exchange Commission
- Ernst Merton, Wisconsin State Senator and lawyer
- Cloyd A. Porter, Wisconsin State Representative
- Edward F. Rakow, Wisconsin State Representative
- Anthony B. Rewald, legislator
- Davis C. Rohr, U.S. Air Force Major General
- Tony Romo, quarterback of the Dallas Cowboys, attended Burlington High School
- Braggo Roth, MLB player
- Frank Roth, MLB player
- Francis Reuschlein, Wisconsin State Representative
- Henry C. Schadeberg, U.S. Representative
- James T. Schuerman, Roman Catholic bishop
- Bob Steele, MLB player
- James Strang, founded the Church of Jesus Christ of Latter Day Saints (Strangite) from Voree; lawyer and member of the Michigan House of Representatives
- Chris Vos, singer/musician of Grammy-nominated alternative rock band, The Record Company
- Robin Vos, Wisconsin State Representative and 75th Speaker of the Wisconsin State Assembly
- Mary Wagner, legislator and jurist

== Images ==
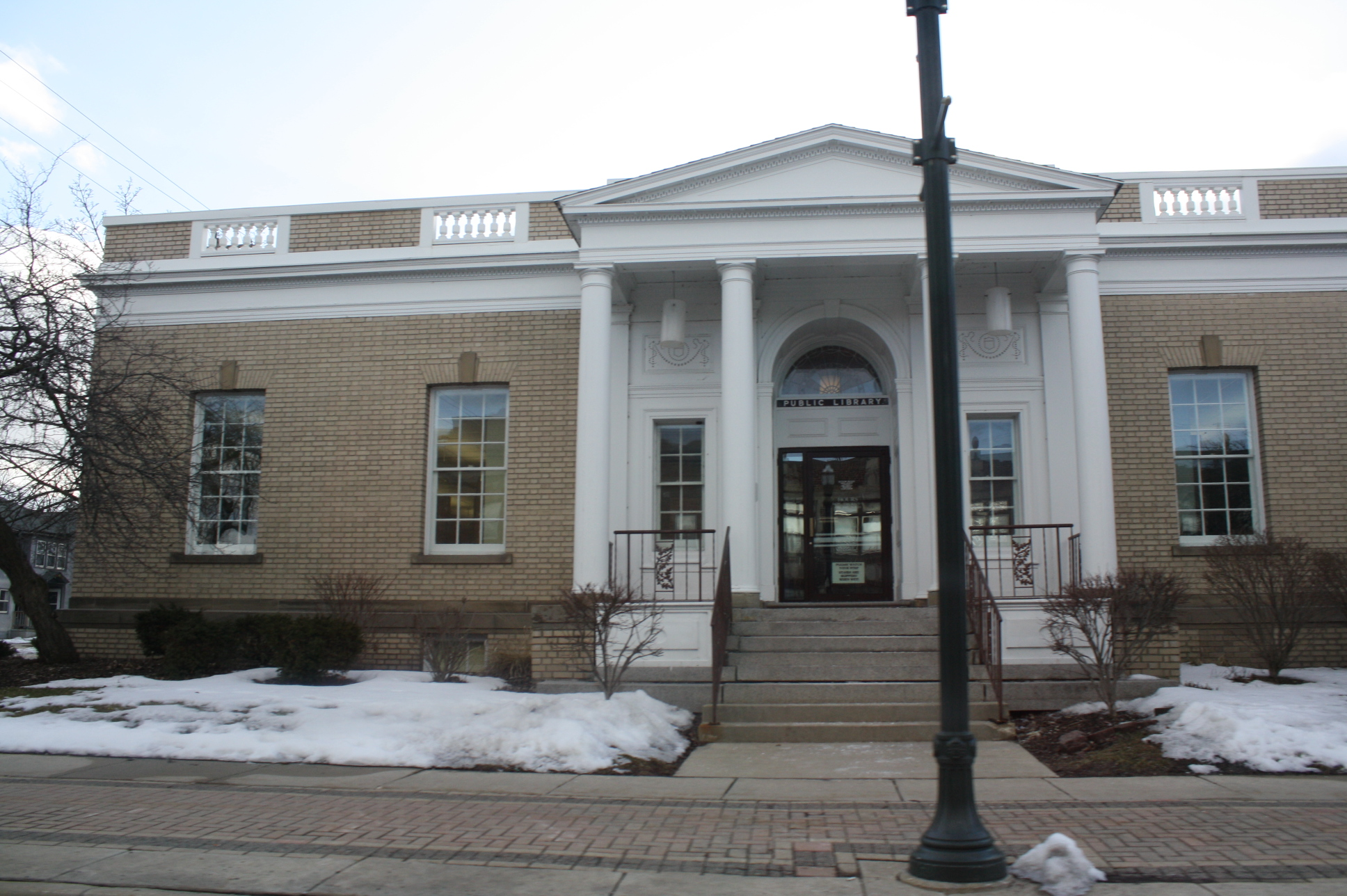
Library

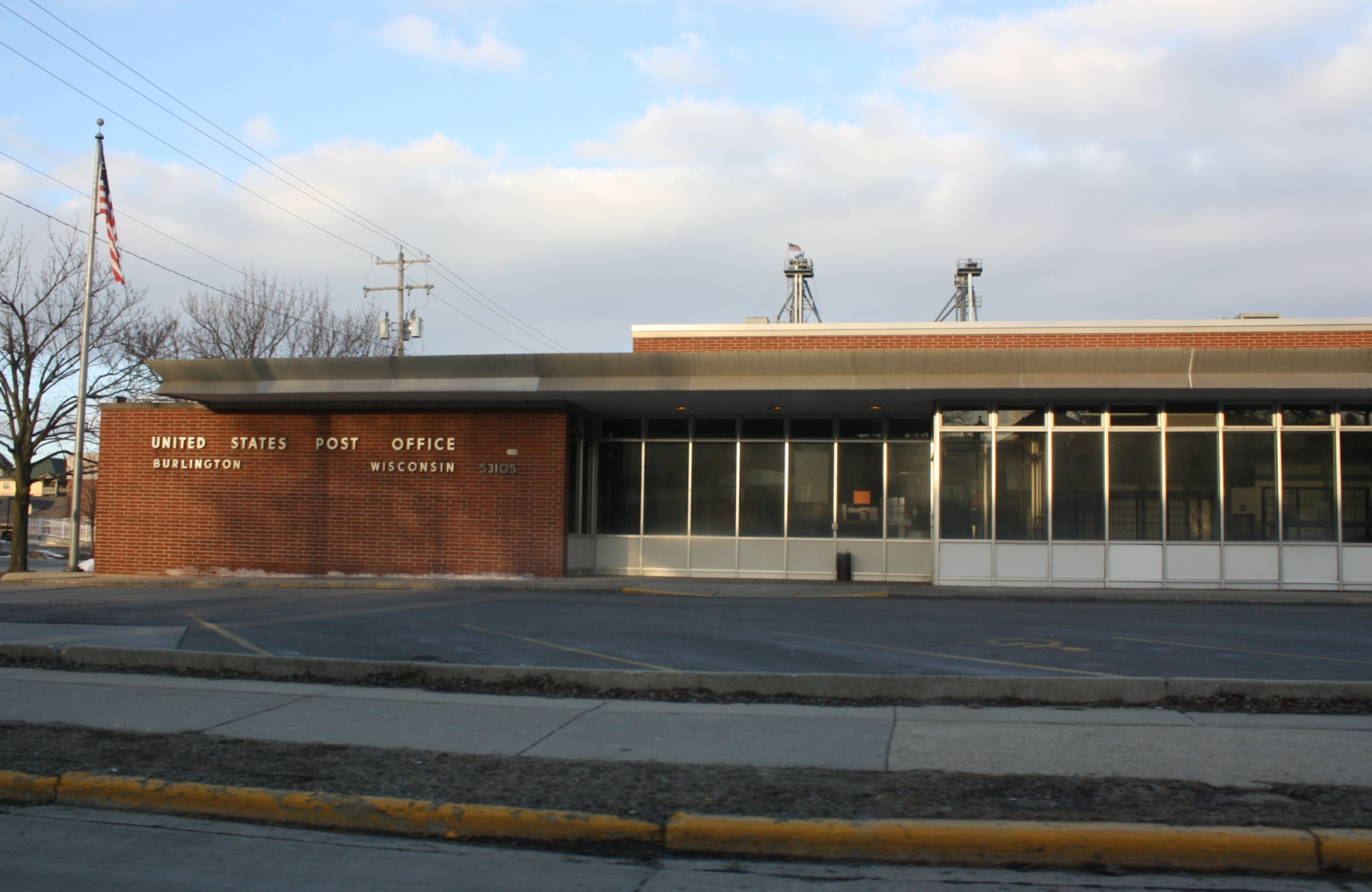
Post office

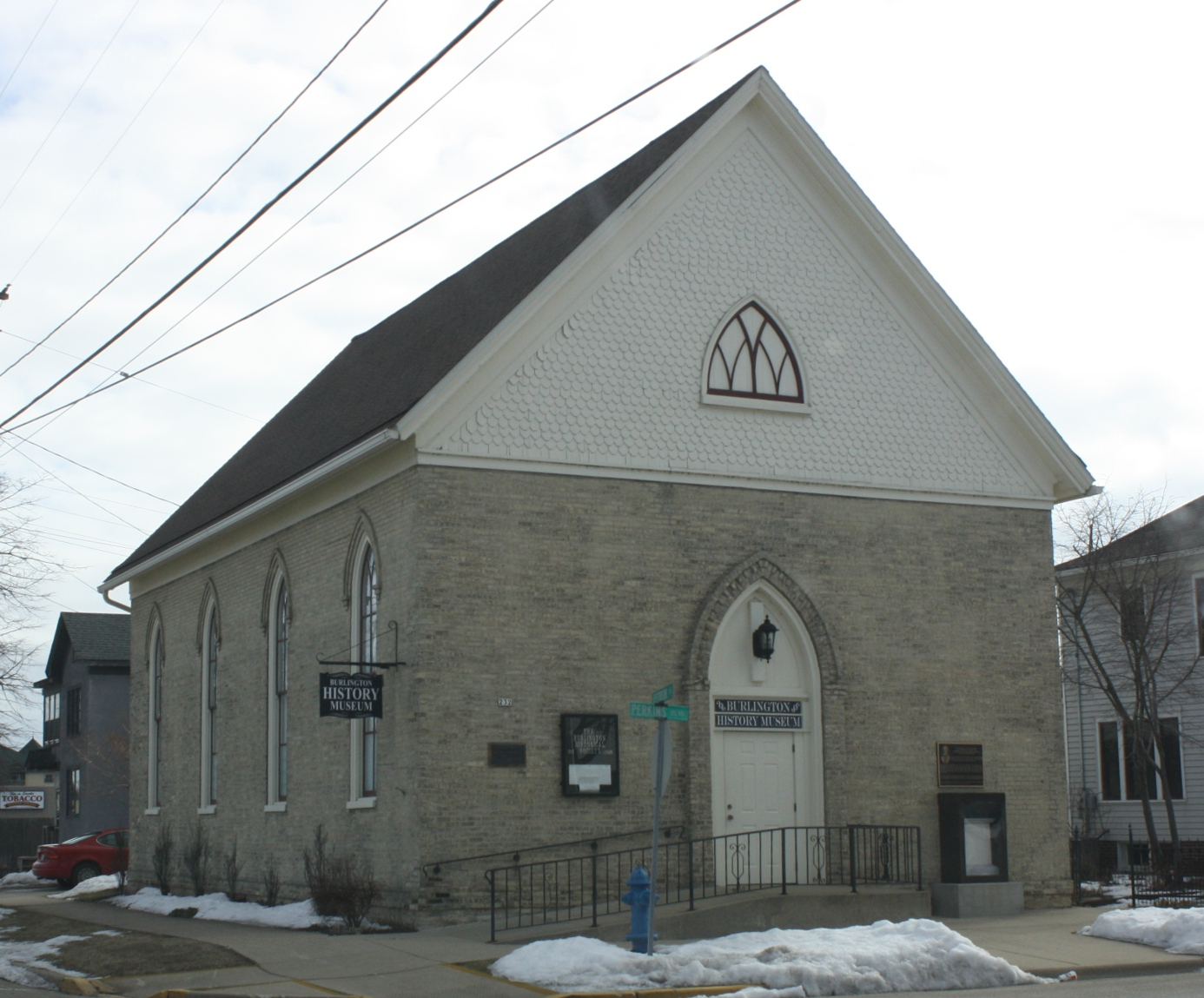
Burlington History Museum

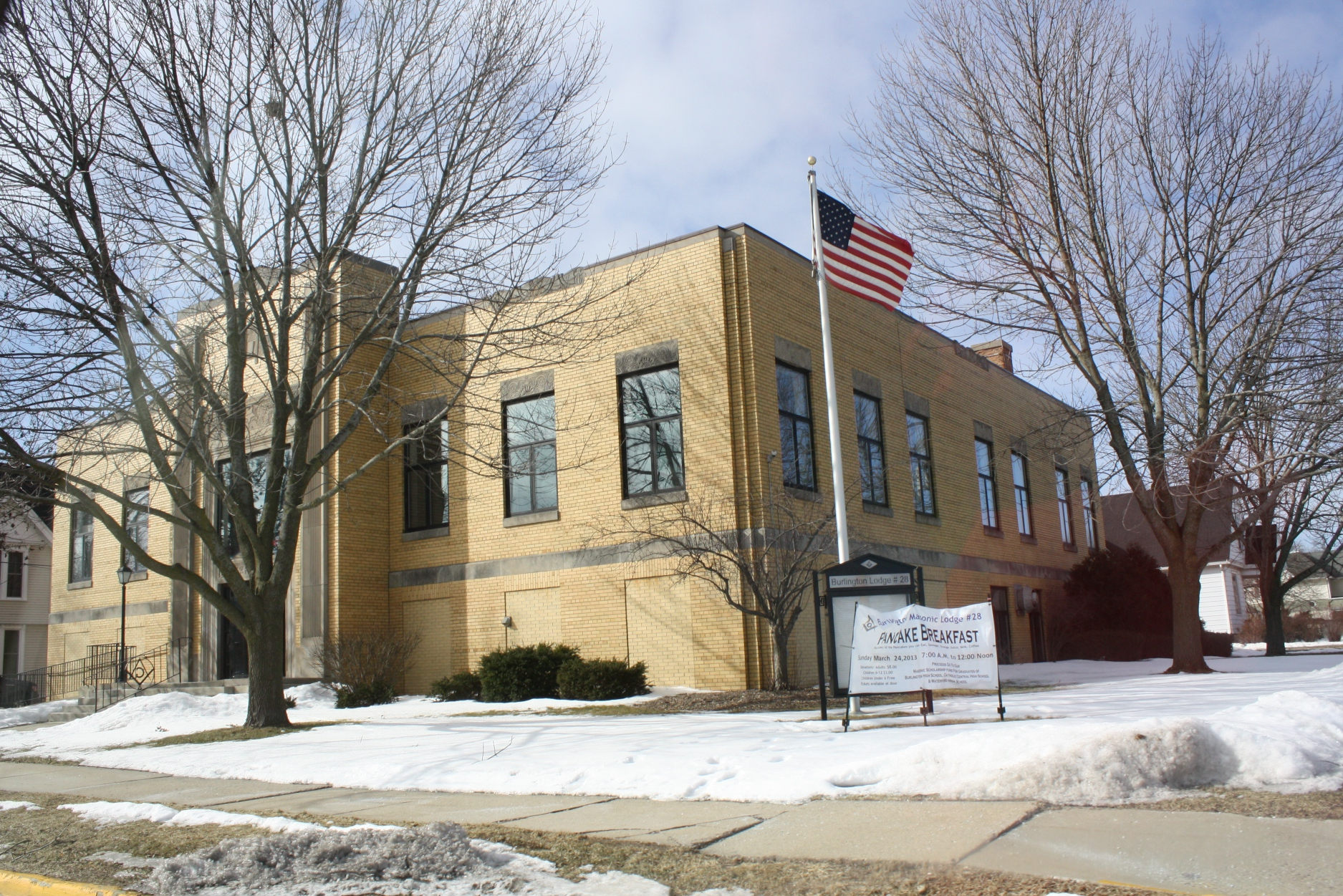
Masonic Lodge
