= Harvard High School (Illinois) =

Location
- 1103 N Jefferson St; Harvard, McHenry County, Illinois 60033; United States
- Coordinates: 42.4283°N 88.6095°W

Information
- Type: public
- Opened: 1921
- School district: Harvard Community Unit School District #50
- Superintendent: Dr. Brandon C. White
- Principal: Carl Hobbs
- Teaching staff: 70.50 (FTE)
- Grades: 9–12
- Gender: coed
- Student to teacher ratio: 11.57
- Hours in school day: 6 hours 45 minutes
- Campus: rural
- Colours: black gold
- Athletics conference: Kishwaukee River Conference
- Nickname: Hornets
- Newspaper: "The Buzz"
- Yearbook: The Hornet
- Website: cusd50.org

Harvard High School, also known as HHS, is a 4-year public high school located in Harvard, Illinois, about 4 miles south of Wisconsin and 80 miles northwest of Chicago. It is part of the Harvard Community Unit School District 50, along with Richard D. Crosby Elementary School (K-3), Jefferson Elementary School (4-5), Washington Elementary School (PreK), and Harvard Jr. High School (6-8).

== History ==
The school opened in 1921, and has undergone many renovations since then. Its most recent renovation was in 2014, adding a new wing to the second floor and remodeling the cafeteria.

== Athletics ==
Harvard High School is part of the Kishwaukee River Conference. Its mascot is the Hornet, and it offers the following sports:

- Football
- Cross Country
- Soccer
- Cheerleading
- Girls' volleyball
- Golf
- Wrestling
- Basketball
- Softball
- Baseball
- Track and field
