= Cloverbelt Conference =

Wisconsin high school athletic conference

The Cloverbelt Conference is a high school athletic conference with its membership base concentrated in west central Wisconsin. Founded in 1927, the conference and its member schools are affiliated with the Wisconsin Interscholastic Athletic Association.

== History ==
=== 1927-1945 ===
Location of Original Cloverbelt Conference Members

The Cloverbelt Conference, originally known as the Wisconsin Clover Belt Interscholastic League, was formed in 1927 by five small high schools in west central Wisconsin: Boyd, Cadott, Owen, Stanley and Thorp. Original member schools were located in Chippewa County and Clark County along Wisconsin Highway 29, a major thoroughfare transversing the state from Green Bay to the Twin Cities. Cornell joined the Cloverbelt Conference in 1928, bringing the loop to six members. In 1933, the conference added Gilman and Lake Holcombe to its membership roster, and subdivided into Eastern and Western divisions:

| Eastern Cloverbelt | Western Cloverbelt |
|---|---|
| Gilman | Boyd |
| Owen | Cadott |
| Stanley | Cornell |
| Thorp | Lake Holcombe |

Withee became the ninth member of the Cloverbelt Conference in 1938 and were assigned to the Eastern Cloverbelt. Gilman moved to the Western Cloverbelt that same year. In 1939, the Cloverbelt Conference sponsored football for the first time, with four schools (Cadott, Cornell, Thorp and Withee) playing the six-player variant until the 1944 season, when the four schools shifted to eight-player football. Neillsville accepted conference membership in 1945, the same year that the Cloverbelt Conference adopted eleven-player football and welcomed full members Owen and Stanley from the defunct football-only Chippewa-Black River Valley Conference. For all other sports, Neillsville joined the Eastern Cloverbelt, giving each division five member schools:

| Eastern Cloverbelt | Western Cloverbelt |
|---|---|
| Neillsville | Boyd |
| Owen | Cadott |
| Stanley | Cornell |
| Thorp | Gilman |
| Withee | Lake Holcombe |

=== 1945-1964 ===
After World War II, rural school district consolidation began to affect members of the Cloverbelt Conference. Lake Holcombe left the Western Cloverbelt to join the new Flambeauland Conference in 1946, with Altoona replacing them after having previously competed in the Little Eight Conference. In 1948, Boyd was consolidated into Stanley (though the school wouldn't be renamed until 1965), and another former Little Eight member (Fall Creek) took their place in the Western Cloverbelt. The Cloverbelt Conference remained a ten-school league until 1955, when Owen and Withee merged, with the new school inheriting Owen's membership in the Eastern Cloverbelt. Elk Mound joined the next year from the Dunn-St. Croix Conference as the Cloverbelt's tenth school, becoming members of the Western Cloverbelt with Gilman shifting back to the Eastern Cloverbelt:

| Eastern Cloverbelt | Western Cloverbelt |
|---|---|
| Gilman | Altoona |
| Neillsville | Cadott |
| Owen-Withee | Cornell |
| Stanley | Elk Mound |
| Thorp | Fall Creek |

Elk Mound's stay in the Cloverbelt would be brief, as they returned to the Dunn-St. Croix Conference in 1961. In 1962, the Cloverbelt Conference accepted four new members who were displaced by the dissolution of the nearby 3-C Conference: Colby, Dor-Abby, Greenwood and Loyal. All four schools joined the Eastern Cloverbelt with Gilman and Stanley moving over to the Western Cloverbelt:

| Eastern Cloverbelt | Western Cloverbelt |
|---|---|
| Colby | Altoona |
| Dor-Abby | Cadott |
| Greenwood | Cornell |
| Loyal | Fall Creek |
| Neillsville | Gilman |
| Owen-Withee | Stanley |
| Thorp | |

=== 1964-1982 ===
Dor-Abby would become the new Abbotsford High School in 1964 after the merger between Dorchester and Abbotsford that had taken place three years earlier was ended. The Cloverbelt Conference also adopted the Eastern-Western divisional format for football alongside the other sports offered. Lake Holcombe rejoined the Western Cloverbelt in 1965, giving each division seven schools. This alignment would be short-lived, as Abbotsford left in 1966 to join the Marawood Conference. Lake Holcombe exited in 1970 to become a member of the Lakeland Conference, and the conference competed as a twelve-member league for the first half of the 1970s:

| Eastern Cloverbelt | Western Cloverbelt |
|---|---|
| Colby | Altoona |
| Greenwood | Cadott |
| Loyal | Cornell |
| Neillsville | Fall Creek |
| Owen-Withee | Gilman |
| Thorp | Stanley-Boyd |

Colby left the Cloverbelt Conference in 1976 to join an expanded Lumberjack Conference, but their membership only lasted for two seasons. They returned in 1978, bringing three former Lumberjack members with them: Auburndale, Mosinee and Nekoosa. All four schools took up residence in the Eastern Cloverbelt with Thorp moving to the Western Cloverbelt to accommodate the expansion:

| Eastern Cloverbelt | Western Cloverbelt |
|---|---|
| Auburndale | Altoona |
| Colby | Cadott |
| Greenwood | Cornell |
| Loyal | Fall Creek |
| Mosinee | Gilman |
| Neillsville | Stanley-Boyd |
| Nekoosa | Thorp |
| Owen-Withee | |

Football was also realigned by enrollment size instead of geographical location for the first time in 1978, with all fifteen members participating:

| Large Cloverbelt | Small Cloverbelt |
|---|---|
| Auburndale | Altoona |
| Cadott | Cornell |
| Colby | Fall Creek |
| Mosinee | Gilman |
| Neillsville | Greenwood |
| Nekoosa | Loyal |
| Stanley-Boyd | Owen-Withee |
| | Thorp |

=== 1982-2008 ===
Nekoosa was only a Cloverbelt member for four years before they left to join the South Central Conference in 1982, leaving the conference with fourteen member schools. Osseo-Fairchild would move over from the Dairyland Conference in 1986 with Thorp returning to their former home in the Eastern Cloverbelt. Augusta's entry to the Western Cloverbelt from the Dairyland in 1990 gave the conference sixteen members:

| Eastern Cloverbelt | Western Cloverbelt |
|---|---|
| Auburndale | Altoona |
| Colby | Augusta |
| Greenwood | Cadott |
| Loyal | Cornell |
| Mosinee | Fall Creek |
| Neillsville | Gilman |
| Owen-Withee | Osseo-Fairchild |
| Thorp | Stanley-Boyd |

This alignment would remain in place for most of the 1990s, the first change was Cornell's exit in 1998 to join the Lakeland Conference. In 2000, Auburndale left to rejoin the Marawood Conference, and two schools who were former members of WISAA and the Central Wisconsin Catholic Conference joined the Cloverbelt: McDonell Central Catholic in Chippewa Falls and Regis in Eau Claire. Both schools took up residence in the Western Cloverbelt with Stanley-Boyd shifting to the Eastern Cloverbelt:

| Eastern Cloverbelt | Western Cloverbelt |
|---|---|
| Colby | Altoona |
| Greenwood | Augusta |
| Loyal | Cadott |
| Mosinee | Fall Creek |
| Neillsville | Gilman |
| Owen-Withee | McDonell Central Catholic |
| Stanley-Boyd | Osseo-Fairchild |
| Thorp | Regis |

=== 2008-present ===
In 2008, the Cloverbelt Conference added three former Marawood Conference members to its stable: Columbus Catholic in Marshfield, Granton and Spencer. All three schools joined the Eastern Cloverbelt, with Stanley-Boyd and Thorp moving to the Western Cloverbelt and Augusta shifting to the Eastern Cloverbelt. With the loss of Mosinee to the new Great Northern Conference, the Cloverbelt Conference now had eighteen member schools on its roster:

| Eastern Cloverbelt | Western Cloverbelt |
|---|---|
| Augusta | Altoona |
| Colby | Cadott |
| Columbus Catholic | Fall Creek |
| Granton | Gilman |
| Greenwood | McDonell Central Catholic |
| Loyal | Osseo-Fairchild |
| Neillsville | Regis |
| Owen-Withee | Stanley-Boyd |
| Spencer | Thorp |

In football, the Cloverbelt Conference members were split into two different conferences. Six members of the Large Cloverbelt were grouped with Regis of the Small Cloverbelt and Spencer (new to the Cloverbelt in 2008), and this conference retained the Cloverbelt moniker. The other group consisted of six schools formerly in the Small Cloverbelt (Augusta, Gilman, Greenwood, Loyal, Owen-Withee and Thorp) and four from the Marawood Conference (Abbotsford, Assumption, Athens and Newman Catholic), with the new conference calling itself the Cloverwood Conference as a nod to its member schools' primary membership:

| Cloverbelt | Cloverwood |
|---|---|
| Altoona | Abbotsford |
| Cadott | Assumption |
| Colby | Athens |
| Fall Creek | Augusta |
| Neillsville | Gilman |
| Osseo-Fairchild | Greenwood |
| Regis | Loyal |
| Spencer | Newman Catholic |
| Stanley-Boyd | Owen-Withee |
| | Thorp |

Augusta would make its return to the Dairyland Conference in 2014, and Gilman shifted to the Eastern Cloverbelt after six decades as Western Cloverbelt members. In 2021, Altoona accepted an invitation to join larger schools in the Middle Border Conference, with Bloomer moving over from the Heart O' North Conference to replace them. Currently, the Cloverbelt Conference has sixteen member schools, with Osseo-Fairchild leaving for membership in the Dairyland Conference in 2024, and Elk Mound rejoining the Cloverbelt Conference in 2025 as a replacement for Osseo-Fairchild.

| Eastern Cloverbelt | Western Cloverbelt |
|---|---|
| Colby | Bloomer |
| Columbus Catholic | Cadott |
| Gilman | Elk Mound |
| Granton | Fall Creek |
| Greenwood | McDonell Central Catholic |
| Loyal | Regis |
| Neillsville | Stanley-Boyd |
| Owen-Withee | Thorp |
| Spencer | |

In September 2026, the WIAA fast-tracked the approval of Gilman to leave the Cloverbelt and join the Lakeland Conference for the 2027-28 school year, bringing nearly a century of membership in that conference to a close.

=== Football (since 2020) ===
In February 2019, in conjunction with the Wisconsin Football Coaches Association, the WIAA released a sweeping football-only realignment for Wisconsin to commence with the 2020 football season and run on a two-year cycle. The Cloverbelt retained five members from the previous alignment (Fall Creek, Neillsville/Granton, Osseo-Fairchild, Regis and Stanley) and added three members of the Dunn-St. Croix Conference (Durand-Arkansaw, Elk Mound and Mondovi) to form its initial roster. This alignment has remained in place for both the 2022-2023 and 2024-2025 competition cycles, with Osseo-Fairchild leaving for the Dunn-St. Croix Conference and all other members retained. The Cloverbelt will also be entering into a scheduling partnership with the Marawood Conference to schedule one mandatory crossover game per member, with results counting towards overall conference standings.

== List of conference members ==
=== Current members ===
| School | Location | Affiliation | Enrollment | Mascot | Colors | Joined | Division |
|---|---|---|---|---|---|---|---|
| Bloomer | Bloomer, WI | Public | 403 | Blackhawks | | 2021 | Western |
| Cadott | Cadott, WI | Public | 226 | Hornets | | 1927 | Western |
| Colby (Note: Left the Cloverbelt Conference in 1976, returned in 1978) | Colby, WI | Public | 299 | Hornets | | 1962, 1978 | Eastern |
| Columbus Catholic | Marshfield, WI | Private (Catholic) | 155 | Dons | | 2008 | Eastern |
| Elk Mound | Elk Mound, WI | Public | 355 | Mounders | | 2025 | Western |
| Fall Creek | Fall Creek, WI | Public | 269 | Crickets | | 1948 | Western |
| Gilman (Note: Joining the Lakeland Conference for the 2027-28 school year) | Gilman, WI | Public | 102 | Pirates | | 1933 | Eastern |
| Granton | Granton, WI | Public | 56 | Bulldogs | | 2008 | Eastern |
| Greenwood | Greenwood, WI | Public | 107 | Indians | | 1962 | Eastern |
| Loyal | Loyal, WI | Public | 162 | Greyhounds | | 1962 | Eastern |
| McDonell Central Catholic | Chippewa Falls, WI | Private (Catholic) | 204 | Macks | | 2000 | Western |
| Neillsville | Neillsville, WI | Public | 271 | Warriors | | 1945 | Eastern |
| Owen-Withee | Owen, WI | Public | 135 | Blackhawks | | 1955 | Eastern |
| Regis | Eau Claire, WI | Private (Catholic) | 227 | Ramblers | | 2000 | Western |
| Spencer | Spencer, WI | Public | 184 | Rockets | | 2008 | Eastern |
| Stanley-Boyd | Stanley, WI | Public | 300 | Orioles | | 1927 | Western |
| Thorp | Thorp, WI | Public | 180 | Cardinals | | 1927 | Western |

=== Current associate members ===
| School | Location | Affiliation | Mascot | Colors | Primary Conference | Sport(s) |
|---|---|---|---|---|---|---|
| Durand-Arkansaw | Durand, WI | Public | Panthers | | Dunn-St. Croix | Football |
| Mondovi | Mondovi, WI | Public | Buffaloes | | Dunn-St. Croix | Football |
| Newman Catholic | Wausau, WI | Private (Catholic) | Cardinals | | Marawood | Boys Golf |

=== Former members ===
| School | Location | Affiliation | Mascot | Colors | Joined | Left | Conference Joined | Current Conference |
|---|---|---|---|---|---|---|---|---|
| Abbotsford | Abbotsford, WI | Public | Falcons | | 1964 | 1966 | Marawood | |
| Altoona | Altoona, WI | Public | Railroaders | | 1946 | 2021 | Middle Border | |
| Auburndale | Auburndale, WI | Public | Eagles | | 1978 | 2000 | Marawood | |
| Augusta | Augusta, WI | Public | Beavers | | 1990 | 2014 | Dairyland | |
| Boyd | Boyd, WI | Public | Bees | | 1927 | 1948 | Closed (consolidated into Stanley) | |
| Cornell | Cornell, WI | Public | Chiefs | | 1928 | 1998 | Lakeland | |
| Dor-Abby | Abbotsford, WI | Public | Falcons | | 1962 | 1964 | Merger dissolved, became Abbotsford | |
| Lake Holcombe | Lake Holcombe, WI | Public | Chieftains | | 1933, 1965 | 1946, 1970 | Flambeauland, Lakeland | Lakeland |
| Mosinee | Mosinee, WI | Public | Indians | | 1978 | 2008 | Great Northern | |
| Nekoosa | Nekoosa, WI | Public | Papermakers | | 1978 | 1982 | South Central | |
| Osseo-Fairchild | Osseo, WI | Public | Thunder | | 1986 | 2024 | Dairyland | |
| Owen | Owen, WI | Public | Eagles | | 1927 | 1955 | Closed (merged into Owen-Withee) | |
| Withee | Withee, WI | Public | Bluejays | | 1938 | 1955 | Closed (merged into Owen-Withee) | |

== Membership timeline ==
=== Full members ===
Eastern Cloverbelt Western Cloverbelt

=== Football members ===
Eastern Cloverbelt Western Cloverbelt Large Cloverbelt Small Cloverbelt

== Membership map ==
Cloverbelt Conference
Location of Cloverbelt Conference full members:
1 Bloomer
2 Cadott
3 Colby
4 Columbus Catholic
5 Elk Mound
6 Fall Creek
7 Gilman
8 Granton
9 Greenwood
10 Loyal
11 McDonell Central Catholic
12 Neillsville
13 Owen-Withee
14 Regis
15 Spencer
16 Stanley-Boyd
17 Thorp

== Sponsored sports ==
| | Baseball | Boys Basketball | Girls Basketball | Boys Cross Country | Girls Cross Country | Football | Boys Golf | Girls Golf (Note: Co-sponsored with the Dunn-St. Croix Conference) | Softball | Boys Track & Field | Girls Track & Field | Girls Volleyball | Boys Wrestling | Girls Wrestling |
|---|---|---|---|---|---|---|---|---|---|---|---|---|---|---|
| Bloomer | ● | ● | ● | ● | ● | | ● | ● | ● | ● | ● | ● | ● (Note: Co-operative with Colfax) | ● |
| Cadott | ● | ● | ● | ● | ● | | ● | | ● | ● | ● | ● | ● | ● |
| Colby | | ● | ● | ● | ● | | ● (Note: Co-operative with Abbotsford) | | ● | ● | ● | ● | | |
| Columbus Catholic | ● | ● | ● | ● | ● | | ● | | ● | ● | ● | ● | | |
| Elk Mound | ● | ● | ● | ● | ● | ● | ● | | ● | ● | ● | ● | ● | ● |
| Fall Creek | ● | ● | ● | ● | ● | ● | ● | | ● | ● | ● | ● | | |
| Gilman | ● | ● | ● | | | | | | ● | ● | ● | ● | | |
| Granton | | | | | | | | | | ● | ● | ● | | |
| Greenwood | | ● (Note: Co-operative with Granton) | ● | | | | | | | ● | ● | ● | | |
| Loyal | ● (Note: Co-operative with Greenwood) | ● | ● | ● | ● | | ● | | ● | ● | ● | ● | | |
| McDonell Central Catholic | ● | ● | ● | ● | ● | | ● (Note: Co-operative with Regis) | | ● | ● | ● | ● | ● | ● |
| Neillsville | ● | ● | ● | ● | ● | ● | ● | | ● | ● | ● | ● | ● (Note: Co-operative with Greenwood and Loyal) | ● |
| Owen-Withee | ● | ● | ● | ● | ● | | ● | ● | ● | ● | ● | ● | | |
| Regis | ● | ● | ● | ● | ● | ● | | | ● | ● | ● | ● | | |
| Spencer | ● | ● | ● | ● | ● | | | | ● | ● | ● | ● | ● (Note: Co-operative with Columbus Catholic and Granton) | ● |
| Stanley-Boyd | ● | ● | ● | ● | ● | ● | ● | ● | ● | ● | ● | ● | ● | ● |
| Thorp | ● | ● | ● | ● | ● | | ● | | ● | ● | ● | ● | ● (Note: Co-operative with Owen-Withee) | ● |

== List of state champions ==
=== Fall sports ===
Boys Cross Country
| School | Year | Division |
|---|---|---|
| McDonell Central Catholic | 2001 | Division 3 |

Football
| School | Year | Division |
|---|---|---|
| Mosinee | 1980 | Division 4 |
| Mosinee | 1980 | Division 4 |
| Gilman | 1986 | Division 6 |
| Greenwood | 1990 | Division 6 |
| Stanley-Boyd | 1991 | Division 4 |
| Owen-Withee | 1992 | Division 6 |
| Fall Creek | 1993 | Division 5 |
| Thorp | 1993 | Division 6 |
| Fall Creek | 1994 | Division 5 |
| Stanley-Boyd | 1995 | Division 4 |
| Osseo-Fairchild | 1996 | Division 5 |
| Colby | 1998 | Division 4 |
| Cadott | 1999 | Division 4 |
| Owen-Withee | 1999 | Division 6 |
| Osseo-Fairchild | 2000 | Division 5 |
| Regis | 2003 | Division 7 |
| Gilman | 2006 | Division 7 |
| Colby | 2008 | Division 5 |
| Colby | 2011 | Division 5 |
| Stanley-Boyd | 2013 | Division 5 |
| Regis | 2016 | Division 6 |
| Regis | 2022 | Division 7 |

Girls Volleyball
| School | Year | Division |
|---|---|---|
| Loyal | 1979 | Class C |
| Stanley-Boyd | 2006 | Division 3 |
| McDonell Central Catholic | 2009 | Division 4 |
| Regis | 2013 | Division 3 |
| McDonell Central Catholic | 2021 | Division 4 |
| McDonell Central Catholic | 2022 | Division 4 |

=== Winter sports ===
Boys Basketball
| School | Year | Division |
|---|---|---|
| Fall Creek | 1984 | Class C |
| Fall Creek | 1985 | Class C |
| Greenwood | 1988 | Class C |
| Auburndale | 1993 | Division 3 |
| Auburndale | 2000 | Division 3 |
| Thorp | 2014 | Division 5 |
| McDonell Central Catholic | 2016 | Division 5 |
| Columbus Catholic | 2024 | Division 5 |

Girls Basketball
| School | Year | Division |
|---|---|---|
| Gilman | 1983 | Class C |
| Fall Creek | 1985 | Class C |
| Fall Creek | 1987 | Class C |
| Fall Creek | 1988 | Class C |
| Augusta | 1996 | Division 4 |
| Fall Creek | 1996 | Division 3 |
| Mosinee | 2000 | Division 2 |
| Regis | 2003 | Division 4 |
| Altoona | 2011 | Division 3 |
| Regis | 2011 | Division 4 |
| Neillsville | 2012 | Division 4 |
| Loyal | 2017 | Division 5 |
| McDonell Central Catholic | 2023 | Division 5 |
| Neillsville | 2026 | Division 4 |

Boys Wrestling
| School | Year | Division |
|---|---|---|
| Neillsville | 1983 | Class B |
| Cadott | 2001 | Division 3 |
| Cadott | 2007 | Division 3 |

=== Spring sports ===
Baseball
| School | Year | Division |
|---|---|---|
| Nekoosa | 1980 | Class B |
| Nekoosa | 1981 | Class B |
| Nekoosa | 1982 | Class B |
| Greenwood | 1988 | Class C |
| Greenwood | 1990 | Class C |
| Regis | 2002 | Division 3 |
| Greenwood | 2013 | Division 4 |
| Regis | 2022 | Division 4 |
| Columbus Catholic | 2026 | Division 4 |

Boys Golf
| School | Year | Division |
|---|---|---|
| Osseo-Fairchild | 1994 | Division 3 |
| Mosinee | 1995 | Division 2 |
| Osseo-Fairchild | 1995 | Division 3 |
| Osseo-Fairchild | 1996 | Division 3 |
| Osseo-Fairchild | 1999 | Division 3 |
| Osseo-Fairchild | 2000 | Division 3 |
| Osseo-Fairchild | 2003 | Division 3 |
| Osseo-Fairchild | 2004 | Division 3 |
| Osseo-Fairchild | 2006 | Division 3 |
| Osseo-Fairchild | 2013 | Division 3 |

Softball
| School | Year | Division |
|---|---|---|
| Loyal | 1978 | Single Division |
| Loyal | 1979 | Class B |
| Loyal | 1980 | Class B |
| McDonell Central Catholic | 2008 | Division 4 |
| Thorp | 2016 | Division 4 |
| McDonell Central Catholic | 2017 | Division 5 |
| McDonell Central Catholic | 2018 | Division 5 |
| Altoona | 2021 | Division 2 |
| Fall Creek | 2024 | Division 4 |

Girls Track & Field
| School | Year | Division |
|---|---|---|
| Mosinee | 1979 | Class B |
| Cadott | 1994 | Division 3 |
| Cadott | 1997 | Division 3 |
| Fall Creek | 1999 | Division 3 |
| Fall Creek | 2000 | Division 3 |
| McDonell Central Catholic | 2014 | Division 3 |
| Fall Creek | 2023 | Division 3 |
| Bloomer | 2026 | Division 2 |

== List of conference champions ==
=== Boys Basketball ===
| School | Quantity | Years |
|---|---|---|
| Thorp | 31 | 1935, 1939, 1944, 1946, 1947, 1948, 1949, 1950, 1951, 1952, 1953, 1954, 1956, 1957, 1958, 1960, 1961, 1963, 1964, 1967, 1969, 1970, 1971, 1973, 1977, 1978, 1982, 1988, 1989, 2001, 2003 |
| Fall Creek | 26 | 1953, 1956, 1957, 1970, 1971, 1972, 1976, 1977, 1978, 1980, 1983, 1984, 1985, 1986, 1987, 1994, 1995, 1996, 2002, 2009, 2010, 2013, 2014, 2021, 2022, 2026 |
| Cornell | 25 | 1935, 1936, 1937, 1938, 1939, 1940, 1941, 1942, 1943, 1945, 1946, 1949, 1950, 1955, 1958, 1959, 1960, 1961, 1963, 1964, 1966, 1967, 1968, 1969, 1988 |
| Altoona | 24 | 1947, 1948, 1950, 1951, 1952, 1958, 1962, 1965, 1972, 1973, 1974, 1975, 1980, 1981, 1986, 1990, 1997, 1998, 1999, 2003, 2005, 2006, 2007, 2020 |
| Stanley-Boyd | 16 | 1928, 1929, 1931, 1932, 1933, 1934, 1935, 1936, 1937, 1938, 1940, 1943, 1945, 1954, 1955, 1959 |
| Auburndale | 13 | 1985, 1986, 1990, 1991, 1992, 1993, 1994, 1995, 1996, 1997, 1998, 1999, 2000 |
| Columbus Catholic | 12 | 2010, 2011, 2014, 2016, 2017, 2018, 2019, 2021, 2022, 2024, 2025, 2026 |
| Colby | 11 | 1972, 1974, 1980, 1983, 1992, 2005, 2006, 2008, 2009, 2011, 2023 |
| Neillsville | 9 | 1962, 1965, 1968, 1969, 1975, 1976, 1979, 1981, 2020 |
| Osseo-Fairchild | 9 | 1988, 1991, 1992, 1993, 2000, 2002, 2014, 2018, 2019 |
| Cadott | 8 | 1930, 1933, 1943, 1954, 1955, 1979, 1980, 1989 |
| Regis | 7 | 2001, 2004, 2008, 2011, 2015, 2016, 2026 |
| Greenwood | 5 | 1966, 1987, 2002, 2004, 2007 |
| McDonell Central Catholic | 5 | 2002, 2012, 2016, 2017, 2023 |
| Owen-Withee | 5 | 1957, 1977, 2003, 2014, 2025 |
| Augusta | 2 | 2012, 2013 |
| Bloomer | 2 | 2024, 2025 |
| Owen | 2 | 1929, 1941 |
| Spencer | 2 | 2015, 2020 |
| Boyd | 1 | 1944 |
| Dor-Abby | 1 | 1963 |
| Gilman | 1 | 2007 |
| Loyal | 1 | 1968 |
| Mosinee | 1 | 1984 |
| Nekoosa | 1 | 1982 |
| Withee | 1 | 1942 |
| Abbotsford | 0 | |
| Elk Mound | 0 | |
| Granton | 0 | |
| Lake Holcombe | 0 | |

=== Girls Basketball ===
| School | Quantity | Years |
|---|---|---|
| Fall Creek | 21 | 1975, 1985, 1986, 1987, 1988, 1989, 1990, 1991, 1992, 1993, 1994, 1995, 1996, 1997, 1998, 2000, 2005, 2014, 2015, 2024, 2025 |
| Neillsville | 18 | 1975, 2006, 2007, 2008, 2009, 2010, 2011, 2012, 2013, 2014, 2017, 2020, 2021, 2022, 2023, 2024, 2025, 2026 |
| Owen-Withee | 16 | 1975, 1976, 1977, 1978, 1979, 1980, 1981, 1982, 1983, 1984, 1986, 1987, 1988, 1989, 1994, 2003 |
| Regis | 15 | 2002, 2003, 2004, 2005, 2009, 2011, 2012, 2013, 2015, 2016, 2017, 2018, 2019, 2025, 2026 |
| Osseo-Fairchild | 9 | 2006, 2007, 2008, 2009, 2010, 2018, 2020, 2022, 2023 |
| Mosinee | 8 | 1991, 1992, 1993, 1997, 1998, 1999, 2000, 2001 |
| Thorp | 7 | 1974, 1984, 1990, 1993, 2002, 2004, 2005 |
| Stanley-Boyd | 6 | 1977, 1978, 1979, 1981, 1989, 1991 |
| Altoona | 4 | 1975, 1976, 2001, 2008 |
| Greenwood | 4 | 1985, 1990, 1995, 1996 |
| Cadott | 3 | 1975, 1984, 1999 |
| Loyal | 3 | 2015, 2016, 2017 |
| McDonell Central Catholic | 3 | 2023, 2024, 2025 |
| Auburndale | 2 | 1981, 1991 |
| Colby | 2 | 2018, 2019 |
| Gilman | 2 | 1982, 1983 |
| Cornell | 1 | 1980 |
| Augusta | 0 | |
| Bloomer | 0 | |
| Columbus Catholic | 0 | |
| Elk Mound | 0 | |
| Granton | 0 | |
| Nekoosa | 0 | |
| Spencer | 0 | |

=== Football ===
| School | Quantity | Years |
|---|---|---|
| Stanley-Boyd | 22 | 1945, 1966, 1967, 1968, 1969, 1972, 1973, 1974, 1975, 1977, 1986, 1987, 1988, 1989, 1990, 1991, 1992, 1997, 2007, 2013, 2014, 2017 |
| Thorp | 15 | 1942, 1948, 1950, 1952, 1953, 1956, 1960, 1963, 1964, 1965, 1970, 1981, 1997, 1998, 2002 |
| Colby | 14 | 1965, 1971, 1972, 1973, 1974, 1982, 1984, 1985, 1995, 1998, 2008, 2009, 2010, 2011 |
| Cornell | 14 | 1939, 1943, 1944, 1948, 1949, 1954, 1957, 1958, 1959, 1961, 1962, 1964, 1971, 1980 |
| Regis | 14 | 2003, 2004, 2005, 2006, 2012, 2016, 2018, 2019, 2020, 2021, 2022, 2023, 2024, 2025 |
| Fall Creek | 13 | 1970, 1976, 1982, 1983, 1984, 1985, 1987, 1989, 1991, 1993, 1994, 1995, 2006 |
| Greenwood | 10 | 1965, 1966, 1967, 1968, 1969, 1970, 1976, 1988, 1989, 1996 |
| Mosinee | 8 | 1979, 1980, 1981, 1983, 1994, 1995, 2003, 2005 |
| Owen-Withee | 8 | 1955, 1978, 1992, 1998, 1999, 2000, 2001, 2007 |
| Osseo-Fairchild | 7 | 1992, 1993, 1995, 1996, 2001, 2002, 2004 |
| Cadott | 5 | 1951, 1974, 1978, 1988, 1999 |
| Neillsville | 4 | 1947, 1975, 1977, 2006 |
| Gilman | 2 | 1986, 2000 |
| Mondovi | 2 | 2026 |
| Neillsville/ Granton | 2 | 1992, 2000 |
| Withee | 2 | 1940, 1941 |
| Altoona | 1 | 1979 |
| Augusta | 1 | 1990 |
| Lake Holcombe | 1 | 1965 |
| Owen | 1 | 1946 |
| Spencer/ Columbus Catholic | 1 | 2015 |
| Abbotsford | 0 | |
| Auburndale | 0 | |
| Dor-Abby | 0 | |
| Durand-Arkansaw | 0 | |
| Elk Mound | 0 | |
| Loyal | 0 | |
| McDonell Central Catholic | 0 | |
| Nekoosa | 0 | |
| Spencer | 0 | |
