= Chippewa-Black River Valley Conference =

Wisconsin high school football conference (1929-1944)

The Chippewa-Black River Valley Conference is a former high school football conference with its membership concentrated in west central Wisconsin. Active from 1929 to 1944, the conference's member schools were affiliated with the Wisconsin Interscholastic Athletic Association.

== History ==
The Chippewa-Black River Valley Conference was founded in 1929 by eight high schools in close proximity to the Black River and Chippewa River in western Wisconsin: Arcadia, Augusta, Black River Falls, Medford, Mondovi, Neillsville, Owen and Stanley. All member schools belonged to conferences which did not sponsor football at the time of its formation and grouped together to promote regular interscholastic competition. Aside from a few interruptions in membership, the conference's roster stayed stable for the first eight years of its existence. In 1938, Durand was welcomed as a new member of the conference, and along with Arcadia's return after a one-year hiatus, the Chippewa-Black River Falls Conference stood at nine members. A new alignment also debuted for the 1938 season that saw the members partitioned into eastern and western divisions:

Eastern Division	Western Division
Medford	Arcadia
Neillsville	Augusta
Owen	Black River Falls
Stanley	Durand
	Mondovi

Before the 1939 season, the Chippewa-Black River Valley Conference lost all of its members in the Western Division when the Mississippi Valley Conference (of which all five schools were members) began sponsorship of football. Mosinee joined the conference to bring membership to five schools, which is where it remained for the rest of its existence. After the 1944 season, the Chippewa-Black River Valley Conference was disbanded when three of its members (Neillsville, Owen and Stanley) joined their primary home for competition, the Cloverbelt Conference, after its transition to eleven-player football was implemented for 1945. Medford and Mosinee played as independents for the 1945 season prior to the formation of the Lumberjack Conference in 1946.

== Conference membership history ==
School	Location	Affiliation	Mascot	Colors	Seasons	Primary Conference(s)
Arcadia	Arcadia, WI	Public	Raiders		1929–1936, 1938	Mississippi Valley
Augusta	Augusta, WI	Public	Beavers		1929–1931, 1933–1938	Little Eight, Mississippi Valley
Black River Falls	Black River Falls, WI	Public	Tigers		1929–1938	Little Eight, Mississippi Valley
Medford	Medford, WI	Public	Raiders		1929–1944	3-C
Mondovi	Mondovi, WI	Public	Buffaloes		1929–1938	Bi-County, Mississippi Valley
Neillsville	Neillsville, WI	Public	Warriors		1929–1944	3-C, Little Eight
Owen	Owen, WI	Public	Eagles		1929–1944	Cloverbelt
Stanley	Stanley, WI	Public	Orioles		1929–1944	Cloverbelt
Durand	Durand, WI	Public	Panthers		1938	Bi-County, Mississippi Valley
Mosinee	Mosinee, WI	Public	Papermakers		1939–1944	Marathon County

== Membership timeline ==
Eastern Division Western Division

== List of conference champions ==
School	Quantity	Years
Medford	8	1929, 1930, 1933, 1934, 1936, 1938, 1941, 1943
Mosinee	3	1939, 1942, 1944
Stanley	3	1935, 1937, 1940
Arcadia	2	1932, 1938
Black River Falls	2	1930, 1931
Neillsville	1	1934
Augusta	0	
Durand	0	
Mondovi	0	
Owen	0	
