= 3-C Conference =

Wisconsin high school athletic conference (1928-1962)

The 3-C Conference is a former high school athletic conference with its membership concentrated in central Wisconsin. Founded in 1928 and ending operations in 1962, all members were affiliated with the Wisconsin Interscholastic Athletic Association.

== History ==
=== 1928–1933 ===
Location of Original 3-C Conference Members

The 3-C Conference, originally known as the Tri-County Basketball Conference for its first sponsored sport, was formed in 1928 by seven small high schools in central Wisconsin: Abbotsford, Colby, Dorchester, Granton, Greenwood, Neillsville, and Unity (not to be confused with the Unity High School that was later opened in Balsam Lake). An eighth school (Loyal) was part of this initial group, but wouldn't join in athletic competition until a few years later. The conference's name originated with the three counties that member schools were located in (Clark, Marathon and Taylor). Rib Lake and Spencer joined the 3-C Conference in 1929, and Medford became its tenth member in 1930 after leaving the Wisconsin Valley Conference a few years earlier. Spencer would leave the next year with Loyal entering competition, and in 1932, Neillsville departed for membership in the Little Eight Conference.

=== 1933–1955 ===
In 1933, Westboro entered the 3-C Conference, and the conference split into geographically aligned sections:

Northern Section	Southern Section
Abbotsford	Colby
Dorchester	Granton
Medford	Greenwood
Rib Lake	Loyal
Westboro	Unity

Spencer reentered the 3-C Conference in 1934 and were assigned to the conference's Southern Section. In 1935, Loyal left the conference and were replaced by Prentice High School in Price County, entering the league's Northern Section. Despite the addition of a fourth county to the membership stable, the 3-C Conference kept its name. Loyal rejoined the 3-C Conference's Southern Section in 1938, bringing membership back up to twelve schools. Prentice's membership lasted until the middle of World War II, and the conference went back down to eleven schools until Phillips joined the loop's Northern Section in 1949. Football was first sponsored by the conference for the 1948 season, with five members (Abbotsford, Granton, Greenwood, Loyal and Spencer) participating. Unity High School was consolidated into Colby in 1954, leaving the conference with eleven members.

=== 1955–1962 ===
Location of Final 3-C Conference Members

In 1955, Medford and Phillips left the 3-C Conference to become exclusive members of the Lumberjack Conference after having dual affiliation the past two years. Membership decreased to eight schools in 1961 when Abbotsford and Dorchester merged, and divisional play was discontinued as well. The 3-C Conference played its last game in 1962, with four members (Colby, Dor-Abby, Greenwood and Loyal) joining the Cloverbelt Conference, two members (Granton and Spencer) becoming members of the Marawood Conference, and two entered the Flambeau League (Rib Lake and Westboro).

== Conference membership history ==
=== Final members ===
School	Location	Affiliation	Mascot	Colors	Joined	Left	Conference Joined	Current Conference
Colby	Colby, WI	Public	Hornets		1928	1962	Cloverbelt	
Dor-Abby	Abbotsford, WI	Public	Falcons		1961	1962	Cloverbelt	Merger dissolved in 1964, became Abbotsford
Granton	Granton, WI	Public	Bulldogs		1928	1962	Marawood	Cloverbelt
Greenwood	Greenwood, WI	Public	Indians		1928	1962	Cloverbelt	
Loyal	Loyal, WI	Public	Greyhounds		1938	1962	Cloverbelt	
Rib Lake	Rib Lake, WI	Public	Redmen		1929	1962	Flambeau	Marawood
Spencer	Spencer, WI	Public	Rockets		1934	1962	Independent, Marawood	Cloverbelt
Westboro	Westboro, WI	Public	Trojans		1933	1962	Flambeau	Closed in 1967 (consolidated into Rib Lake)

=== Previous members ===
School	Location	Affiliation	Mascot	Colors	Joined	Left	Conference Joined	Current Conference
Abbotsford	Abbotsford, WI	Public	Panthers		1928	1961	3-C (merged into Dor-Abby)	Marawood
Dorchester	Dorchester, WI	Public	Red Devils		1928	1961	3-C (merged into Dor-Abby)	Merger dissolved in 1964, became Abbotsford
Neillsville	Neillsville, WI	Public	Warriors		1928	1932	Little Eight	Cloverbelt
Unity	Unity, WI	Public	Warriors		1928	1954	Closed (consolidated into Colby)	
Spencer	Spencer, WI	Public	Rockets		1929,	1931,	Independent, Marawood	Cloverbelt
Medford	Medford, WI	Public	Raiders		1930	1955	Lumberjack	Great Northern
Loyal	Loyal, WI	Public	Greyhounds		1931,	1935,	Cloverbelt	
Prentice	Prentice, WI	Public	Buccaneers		1935	1943	Independent	Marawood
Phillips	Phillips, WI	Public	Loggers		1949	1955	Lumberjack	Marawood

=== Football-only members ===
School	Location	Affiliation	Enrollment	Mascot	Colors	Seasons	Primary Conference
Auburndale	Auburndale, WI	Public	229	Apaches		1950-1961	Marawood
Withee	Withee, WI	Public	N/A	Bluejays		1950-1954	Cloverbelt

== Membership timeline ==
=== Full members ===
Northern Section Southern Section

== List of conference champions ==
=== Boys Basketball ===
School	Quantity	Years
Colby	11	1933, 1935, 1944, 1947, 1950, 1956, 1957, 1958, 1959, 1960, 1961
Abbotsford	10	1935, 1936, 1938, 1946, 1947, 1956, 1957, 1959, 1960, 1961
Greenwood	9	1934, 1936, 1939, 1945, 1946, 1949, 1953, 1954, 1955
Medford	9	1932, 1939, 1940, 1941, 1942, 1952, 1953, 1954, 1955
Rib Lake	9	1934, 1937, 1944, 1945, 1948, 1949, 1950, 1951, 1958
Spencer	4	1938, 1942, 1951, 1952
Unity	4	1930, 1937, 1940, 1941
Granton	2	1931, 1937
Dor-Abby	1	1962
Loyal	1	1948
Neillsville	1	1929
Prentice	1	1937
Dorchester	0	
Phillips	0	
Westboro	0	

=== Football ===
School	Quantity	Years
Greenwood	6	1948, 1950, 1952, 1956, 1957, 1961
Abbotsford	3	1949, 1955, 1958
Spencer	3	1949, 1951, 1954
Auburndale	2	1954, 1960
Colby	1	1959
Granton	1	1949
Withee	1	1953
Dor-Abby	0	
Loyal	0	
