= Fall Creek High School =

Location
- 336 Hoover Avenue; Fall Creek, Wisconsin; United States; 44°45′47″N 91°16′34″W

Information
- Type: Public secondary
- Established: 1912
- Oversight: Fall Creek School District
- Superintendent: Brad Ceranski
- Principal: Trevor Kohlhepp
- Teaching staff: 17.52 (FTE)
- 9-12: 9-12
- Enrollment: 270 (2024-2025)
- Student to teacher ratio: 15.41
- Colors: Green & White
- Song: Notre Dame Victory March
- Athletics: Cloverbelt Conference
- Mascot: Cricket
- Rival: Altoona High School, Regis High School
- Website: Official website

Fall Creek High School is a high school located in Fall Creek, Wisconsin, United States. It serves grades 9–12 and is part of the Fall Creek School District.

== History ==
Founded in 1912, Fall Creek High School had a graduating class of 3 in 1913. The high school moved into its first education specific facility in 1917. The original school was located on 142 E. Washington Ave. In 1955, the school was expanded adding a gymnasium and a study hall. The district built the current high school at 336 Hoover Avenue in 1975. The opening of a new middle school in 1994, which was combined with the elementary and high school formed the current K-12 building.

== Academics ==
Fall Creek offers a complete curriculum, including English, Social Studies, Mathematics, Science, Health, Business and Information Technology, and Physical Education. Fall Creek also offers a variety of electives and Advanced Placement courses. Fall Creek also belongs to the Cluster A Consortium with Altoona High School, Augusta High School, Eleva-Strum Central High School, Gilmanton High School, Mondovi High School, and Osseo-Fairchild High School. These seven high schools have agreed to cooperate with each other to provide expanded educational opportunities for their students.

== Extracurricular activities ==
=== Athletics ===
In 1917, Fall Creek started participation in athletics with its first boys' basketball team. The campus grounds include a track, football field, softball diamond, baseball diamond, practice fields, two gymnasiums, weight room, and training facilities. Fall Creek joined the Cloverbelt Conference in 1948, and competes in baseball, basketball, boys' and girls' cross-country, football, golf, softball, track and field, and volleyball. Fall Creek also participates cooperatively with other schools in the following sports; soccer, tennis, wrestling, and hockey.

Fall Creek started playing football in 1962, joining the Cloverbelt Conference in 1964. The football team had an undefeated season in 1976. It took first place in WIAA Division 5 in 1993 and 1994. When the current K-12 building was finished, the football field was moved to its current location. The field was named for Hall of Fame Football Coach Ron Schultz in 2000.

In 1997, the girls' cross country team took first in the WIAA Division 3 Championships.

Fall Creek won its first Wisconsin Interscholastic Athletic Association Class C boys basketball state championship in 1937. In 1983 Fall Creek lost in the finals, however they returned the following 2 years(1984 and 1985) and won both years.

The Fall Creek girls' basketball team won WIAA titles in 1985, 1987, 1988, and 1996. They were runners-up in 1986, 1990, 1994, 1998, and 2015.

The girls track team of Fall Creek won WIAA titles in 1999 and 2000, while finishing second in 1998.

Fall Creek participated as part of the Eau Claire North High School/Altoona High School/Eau Claire Memorial High School/Fall Creek cooperative that won the 2018 WIAA girls hockey championship.

With Fall Creek's success, it has had multiple coaches inducted into different Wisconsin Coaches Halls of Fame. Ron Schultz has been inducted into both the Football Coaches and Basketball Coaches Hall of Fame. Schultz had a record of 211-79-4 coaching football at Fall Creek and his record coaching boys basketball was 507–147. Gwen Hoekstra, Bob Miller, Arnie Skrukrud, and Rick Storlie have been inducted into just the Basketball Coaches Hall of Fame. Skrukrud's record coaching girls basketball was 465–123. Steve Wilhelm has been inducted into the Basketball Hall for his accomplishments as a player at Fall Creek. Wilhelm scored 2235 during his career at Fall Creek

==== Athletic conference affiliation history ====
- Little Eight Conference (1926–1937)
- Cloverbelt Conference (1948–present)

=== Music ===
Fall Creek participates in the Cloverbelt Conference for both Band and Choir

=== Clubs ===
Student organizations include DECA (An Association of Marketing Students), Drama, FBLA (Future Business Leaders of America), FFA (Future Farmers of America), FHA, Forensics, NHS (National Honor Society), Newspaper, Yearbook

== Notable alumni ==
- Todd Boss, class of 1986; poet
