= Spencer High School (Wisconsin) =

High school in Wisconsin, United States

Coordinates: 44.76°N 90.29397°W

Spencer Junior-Senior High School

Location
- 300 North School Street; Spencer, (Marathon County), Wisconsin 54479; United States

Information
- Type: Public high school
- Motto: "Whats Rockin in Rocketville"
- Principal: William Otte
- Headmaster: Jason Gorst
- Staff: 23.64 (FTE)
- Enrollment: 337 (2023-2024)
- Student to teacher ratio: 14.26
- Colors: Red and white
- Fight song: "Illinois Loyalty"
- Athletics conference: Cloverbelt
- Mascot: A rocket
- Nickname: Rockets

Spencer High School is a public high school located in Spencer, in Marathon County, Wisconsin.

Spencer High School has multiple extracurricular activities such as: football, basketball, softball, baseball, track & field, cross country, volleyball, wrestling, drama club, history club, Quiz bowl, Facebook, forensics, FFA, FBLA, and more. The average size of graduating classes is about 40-60 students.

Notable alumni include: Hunter Luepke Carol Kolb. https://en.m.wikipedia.org/wiki/Carol_Kolb

== Athletics ==
Spencer's teams are nicknamed the Rockets, and they have been members of the Cloverbelt Conference since 2008.

=== Athletic conference affiliation history ===
- 3-C Conference (1929-1931, 1934-1962)
- Marawood Conference (1962-2008)
- Cloverbelt Conference (2008–present)
