= Albert Barney =

Albert Barney may refer to:

- Albert B. Barney (1835–1910), American lawyer, businessman, and legislator
- Albert W. Barney Jr. (1920–2010), American lawyer and judge
