= Elk Mound =

Hill in Dunn County, WI, United States

Coordinates: 44°52′44″N 091°41′14″W

- Location within Wisconsin

Highest point
- Elevation: 1,200 ft (370 m)

Geography
- Country: United States
- State: Wisconsin

Geology
- Mountain type: Hill

Elk Mound is a kame, a type of irregularly shaped hill formed by glacial debris, in northwestern Wisconsin. It has an elevation of over 1,200 feet above sea level. The hill lends its name to the village of Elk Mound, Wisconsin, as well as the Town of Elk Mound.

== History ==
Elk bones were found at the mound by early settlers, hence the name.
