= Colby High School (Wisconsin) =

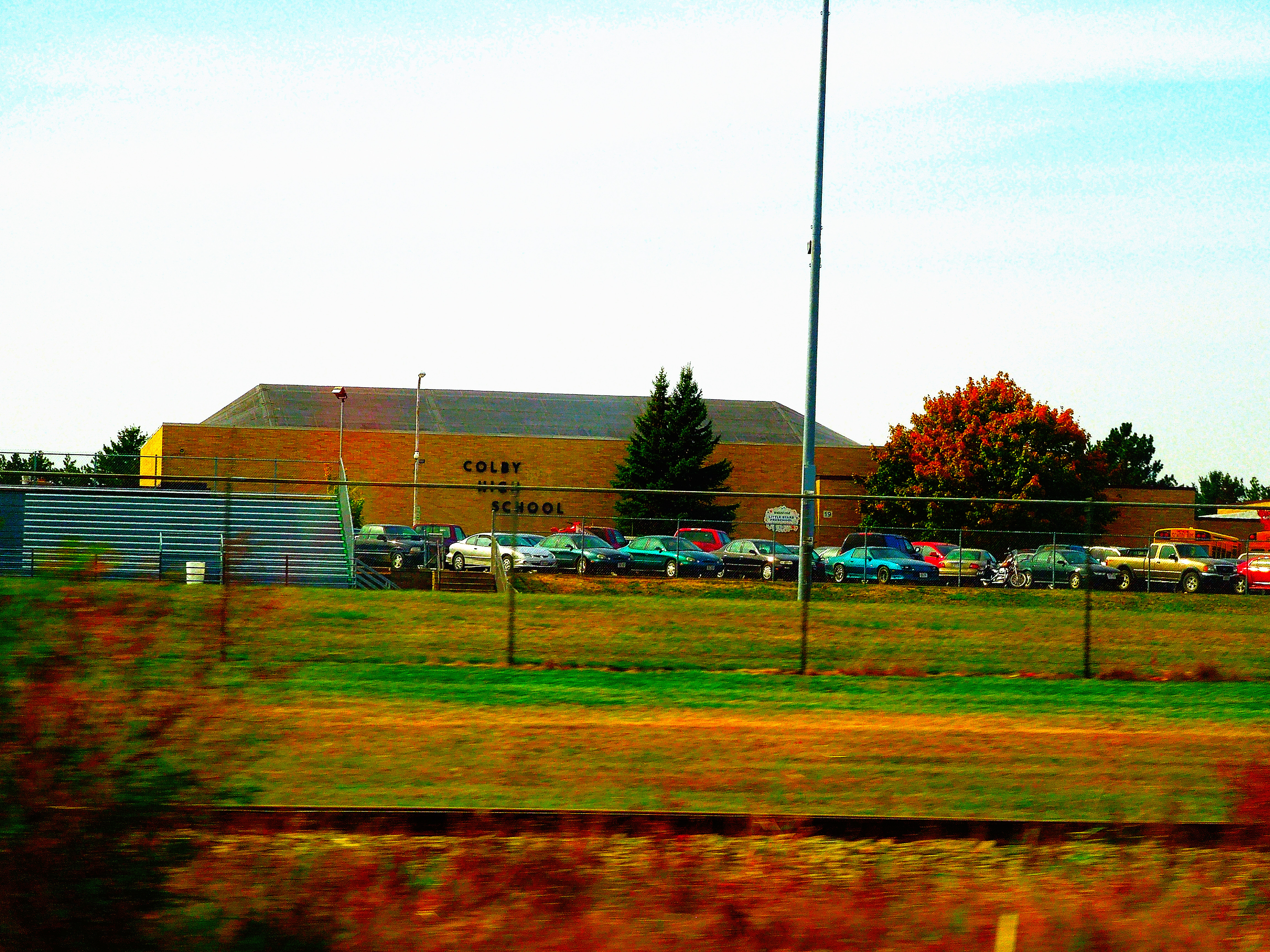
- Colby High School, Oct 2012

Location
- 705 N 2nd Street; Colby, Wisconsin; United States; 44°55′13″N 90°19′07″W

Information
- Type: Public High School
- School district: Colby School District
- NCES District ID: 5502730
- Superintendent: Patrick Galligan
- NCES School ID: 550273000309
- Principal: Marcia Diedrich
- Teaching staff: 18.01 (FTE)
- Grades: 9–12
- Gender: Coeducational
- Enrollment: 299 (2023–2024)
  - Grade 9: 72
  - Grade 10: 72
  - Grade 11: 80
  - Grade 12: 75
- Student to teacher ratio: 16.60∶1
- Colors: Green and gold
- Athletics conference: Cloverbelt Conference
- Mascot: Hornet
- Website: www.colby.k12.wi.us/index.cfm/Colby

Colby High School is a public secondary school located in Colby, Wisconsin. It is located on the Clark County border with Marathon County, and CHS serves about 300 students from both Clark and Marathon counties.

== Academics ==
Colby High School offers Advanced Placement courses, of which approximately a quarter of the student body takes part in.

== Demographics ==
For the 2020–21 academic year, Colby High School (Wisconsin) enrolled 305 students, according to the National Center for Education Statistics. The school employed 18.41 full-time equivalent educators, resulting in a student to teacher ratio of 16.6:1.

Enrollment by race and ethnicity (2020–21)
Race and ethnicity^{†}	Enrolled pupils	Percentage
African American	1	0.33%
Asian	4	1.31%
Hispanic	64	20.98%
Native American	1	0.33%
White	234	76.72%
Native Hawaiian, Pacific islander	0	0%
Multi-race	1	0.33%
Total	305	100%
^{†} "Hispanic" includes Hispanics of any race. All other categories refer to non-Hispanics.

Enrollment by gender (2020–21)
Gender	Enrolled pupils	Percentage
Female	142	46.56%
Male	163	53.44%
Non-binary	0	0%
Total	305	100%

Enrollment by grade (2020–21)
Grade	Enrolled pupils	Percentage
9	79	25.9%
10	77	25.25%
11	74	24.26%
12	75	24.59%
Ungraded	0	0%
Total	305	100%

== Athletics ==
The Colby athletic teams are nicknamed the Hornets and compete in the Cloverbelt Conference. Hornet football teams won WIAA Division 5 state titles in 1998, 2008 and 2011.

=== Athletic conference affiliation history ===
- 3-C Conference (1928-1962)
- Cloverbelt Conference (1962-1976)
- Lumberjack Conference (1976-1978)
- Cloverbelt Conference (1978–present)

== Performing arts ==
Colby has two competitive show choirs, the mixed-gender Coalition and the women's-only Hornettes. The choirs also host the annual Central Wisconsin Show Choir Spectacular competition, which was named the best regional competition in America in 2018.
