= Hunter Luepke =

American football player (born 2000)

No. 30 – Dallas Cowboys
- Position: Fullback
- Roster status: Active

Personal information
- Born: February 28, 2000 (age 26); Spencer, Wisconsin, U.S.
- Listed height: 6 ft 1 in (1.85 m)
- Listed weight: 250 lb (113 kg)

Career information
- High school: Spencer
- College: North Dakota State (2018–2022)
- NFL draft: 2023: undrafted

Career history
- Dallas Cowboys (2023–present)

Awards and highlights
- 2× FCS national champion (2019, 2021); 3× First-team All-MVFC (2020–2022)

Career NFL statistics as of Week 10, 2026
- Rushing yards: 153
- Rushing average: 3.9
- Rushing touchdowns: 1
- Receptions: 33
- Receiving yards: 255
- Receiving touchdowns: 1
- Stats at Pro Football Reference

Hunter Jon Luepke (lip-KEE; born February 28, 2000) is an American professional football fullback for the Dallas Cowboys of the National Football League (NFL). He played college football for the North Dakota State Bison and was signed as an undrafted free agent by the Cowboys after the 2023 NFL draft.

== Early life ==
Luepke grew up in Spencer, Wisconsin and attended Spencer High School. He played football on a co-op team composed of students from Spencer and Columbus Catholic High School in Marshfield, Wisconsin. Luepke finished high school with 4452 rushing yards and 82 touchdowns. He also added 644 receiving yard with 9 touchdowns. As a sophomore Luepke helped his team reach the Division 5 State Championship game, where they would lose to the Amherst Falcons. Luepke committed to play college football at North Dakota State. Luepke also competed in wrestling, where he was a two-time WIAA state champion.

== College career ==
Luepke redshirted his true freshman season with the North Dakota State Bison. He played in 14 games as a redshirt freshman as the Bison won the 2019 FCS national championship. Luepke was named first team All-Missouri Valley Football Conference (MVFC) as a redshirt sophomore after rushing for 458 yards and six touchdowns on 84 carries and caught four passes for 37 yards and one touchdown. Luepke repeated as a first team All-MVFC selection after rushing 87 times for 543 yards and eight touchdowns. Luepke entered his redshirt season as a top fullback prospect for the 2023 NFL Draft. He rushed for 115 yards and two touchdowns and caught three passes for 65 yards and another touchdown in 31-28 loss to FBS Arizona.

Luepke won the 2022 Lowman Trophy for the best college fullback in the nation, presented by the Barstool Sports podcast, Pardon My Take (hosted by Dan Katz and PFT Commenter).

=== Statistics ===
Year	Team	Games		Rushing				Receiving			
Year	Team	GP	GS	Att	Yds	Avg	TD	Rec	Yds	Avg	TD
2019	North Dakota State	14	2	5	43	8.6	1	11	96	8.7	1
2020	North Dakota State	6	5	84	458	5.5	6	4	37	9.3	1
2021	North Dakota State	13	4	87	543	6.2	8	9	165	18.3	3
2022	North Dakota State	10	8	98	621	6.3	9	14	196	14.0	4
Career		43	19	274	1,665	6.1	24	38	494	11.5	9

== Professional career ==
Pre-draft measurables
Height	Weight	Arm length	Hand span	Wingspan	40-yard dash	10-yard split	20-yard split	20-yard shuttle	Three-cone drill	Vertical jump	Broad jump
6 ft 1 1/4 in (1.86 m)	230 lb (104 kg)	31 1/2 in (0.80 m)	9 5/8 in (0.24 m)	6 ft 3 3/4 in (1.92 m)	4.61 s	1.50 s	2.67 s	4.43 s	7.03 s	36.5 in (0.93 m)	9 ft 9 in (2.97 m)
All values from NFL Combine/Pro Day

Luepke was signed by the Dallas Cowboys as an undrafted free agent on April 29, 2023, shortly after the conclusion of the 2023 NFL draft, and received a $200,000 signing bonus. He made the Cowboys' initial 53-man roster coming out of training camp. In his rookie season Luepke recorded 3 carries for 13 yards and a touchdown, 2 receptions for 10 yards, 4 tackles, and 1 kickoff return for 15 yards.

On September 3, 2025, Luepke signed a two-year $7.5 million extension with the Cowboys, making him one of the highest-paid fullbacks in the NFL.

== NFL career statistics ==
Legend
**Bold**	Career high

=== Regular season ===
Year	Team	Games		Rushing					Receiving					Kickoff return					Fumbles	
Year	Team	GP	GS	Att	Yds	Avg	Lng	TD	Rec	Yds	Avg	Lng	TD	Ret	Yds	Avg	Lng	TD	Fum	Lost
2023	DAL	17	0	6	19	3.2	9	**1**	3	18	6.0	12	0	**2**	**15**	**7.5**	**15**	0	0	0
2024	DAL	16	4	12	38	3.2	**10**	0	12	**111**	**9.3**	**24**	0	—	—	—	—	—	0	0
2025	DAL	17	5	**16**	**71**	**4.4**	9	0	**13**	109	8.4	15	**1**	—	—	—	—	—	0	0
Career		50	9	34	128	3.8	10	1	28	238	8.5	24	1	2	15	7.5	15	0	0	0

=== Postseason ===
Year	Team	Games		Rushing					Receiving					Kickoff return					Fumbles	
Year	Team	GP	GS	Att	Yds	Avg	Lng	TD	Rec	Yds	Avg	Lng	TD	Ret	Yds	Avg	Lng	TD	Fum	Lost
2023	DAL	1	0	0	0	0.0	0	0	0	0	0.0	0	0	0	0	0	0	0	0	0
Career		0	0	0	0	0.0	0	0	0	0	0.0	0	0	0	0	0.0	0	0	0	0
