= Little Eight Conference (Wisconsin) =

Wisconsin high school athletic conference (1926-1937)

The Little Eight Conference is a former high school athletic conference in Wisconsin. Founded in 1926 and dissolved in 1937, the conference and its member schools belonged to the Wisconsin Interscholastic Athletic Association.

== History ==
Location of Original Little Eight Conference Members

The Little Eight Conference was formed in 1926 by eight small high schools in west central Wisconsin: Altoona, Augusta, Black River Falls, Fairchild, Fall Creek, Humbird, Merrillan and Osseo. Most conference members were located in Eau Claire County (or the neighboring counties of Clark, Jackson and Trempealeau) and all members with one exception were located along U.S. Route 12. A ninth member was added to the Little Eight in 1931 when Elk Mound moved over from the Dunn-St. Croix Conference. The next year, Neillsville joined as members and the conference was realigned into Northern and Southern sections:

Northern Section	Southern Section
Altoona	Black River Falls
Augusta	Fairchild
Elk Mound	Humbird
Fall Creek	Merrillan
Osseo	Neillsville

Location of Final Little Eight Conference Members

This alignment lasted for three seasons before four members left the Little Eight Conference in 1935: Augusta, Black River Falls, Neillsville and Osseo. Augusta left for membership in the Mississippi Valley Conference along with Osseo, who relinquished dual membership in the Little Eight to join the MVC on a full-time basis. Black River Falls and Neillsville both became independents before forming the Mississippi Valley Triangular League with Augusta in 1936. The six remaining members carried on for two more seasons before the Little Eight Conference ceased operations in 1937. Elk Mound returned to the Dunn-St. Croix Conference and Merrillan became members of the Trempealeau Valley Conference. The other four schools (Altoona, Fairchild, Fall Creek and Humbird) became independents until joining new conferences after World War II.

== Conference membership history ==
=== Final members ===
School	Location	Affiliation	Mascot	Colors	Joined	Left	Conference Joined	Current Conference
Altoona	Altoona, WI	Public	Railroaders		1926	1937	Independent	Middle Border
Elk Mound	Elk Mound, WI	Public	Mounders		1931	1937	Dunn-St. Croix	
Fairchild	Fairchild, WI	Public	Purple Dragons		1926	1937	Independent	Closed in 1968 (merged into Osseo-Fairchild)
Fall Creek	Fall Creek, WI	Public	Crickets		1926	1937	Independent	Cloverbelt
Humbird	Humbird, WI	Public	Game Birds		1926	1937	Independent	Closed in 1949 (merged into Alma Center Lincoln)
Merrillan	Merrillan, WI	Public	Yellow Jackets		1926	1937	Trempealeau Valley	Closed in 1949 (merged into Alma Center Lincoln)

=== Previous members ===
School	Location	Affiliation	Mascot	Colors	Joined	Left	Conference Joined	Current Conference
Augusta	Augusta, WI	Public	Beavers		1926	1935	Mississippi Valley	Dairyland
Black River Falls	Black River Falls, WI	Public	Tigers		1926	1935	Independent	Coulee
Neillsville	Neillsville, WI	Public	Warriors		1932	1935	Independent	Cloverbelt
Osseo	Osseo, WI	Public	Chieftains		1926	1935	Mississippi Valley	Cloverbelt

== Membership timeline ==
Northern Section Southern Section

== List of state champions ==
=== Fall sports ===
None

=== Winter sports ===
Boys Basketball
School	Year	Division
Fall Creek	1937	Class C

=== Spring sports ===
Boys Track & Field
School	Year	Division
Altoona	1934	Class C

== List of conference champions ==
=== Boys Basketball ===
School	Quantity	Years
Fall Creek	5	1927, 1931, 1933, 1936, 1937
Altoona	4	1928, 1931, 1932, 1934
Merrillan	3	1928, 1929, 1933
Augusta	2	1930, 1935
Neillsville	2	1934, 1935
Black River Falls	0	
Elk Mound	0	
Fairchild	0	
Humbird	0	
Osseo	0	
