= Owen High School =

- U.S. National Register of Historic Places
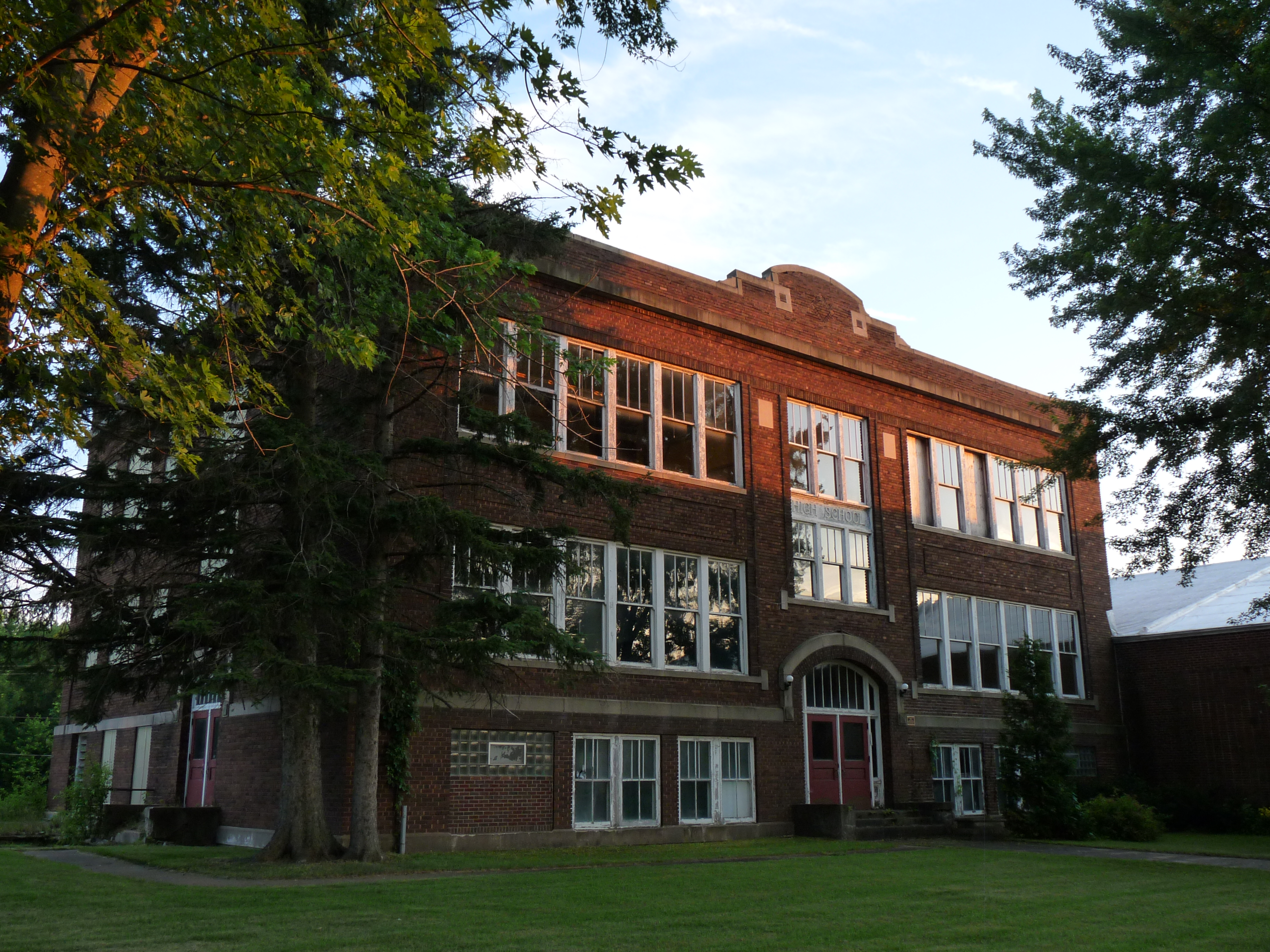
- Owen High School
- Location: 101 East Third St., Owen, Wisconsin
- Coordinates: 44°56′51″N 90°33′53″W
- Area: 7.8 acres (3.2 ha)
- Built: 1921
- Architect: William L. Alban
- Architectural style: Late 19th and Early 20th Century American Movements
- NRHP reference No.: 04000848
- Added to NRHP: August 11, 2004

Owen High School is located in Owen, Wisconsin.

== History ==
The school opened in 1921, also hosting the public library and community events for many years. It was designed for students to move from one specialized classroom (e.g. a lab) to another, which was a rather new idea at the time.

It was added to the State and the National Register of Historic Places in 2004.
