= Elk Mound High School =

School in Dunn County, Wisconsin, US

Location
- 405 University Ave Elk Mound, Wisconsin 54739; Elk Mound, Dunn County, Wisconsin; United States
- Coordinates: 44.8744°N 91.6840°W

Information
- Funding type: Public
- Principal: Paul Kling
- Staff: 24.65 (FTE)
- Grades: 9 through 12
- Enrollment: 368 (2023-2024)
- Student to teacher ratio: 14.93
- Colors: Orange and black
- Song: On Wisconsin
- Mascot: Mounder/Elk
- Website: Elk Mound High School

Elk Mound High School is a public high school located in Elk Mound, Wisconsin. It is a member of the Cloverbelt Conference.

== Athletics ==
Elk Mound's athletic teams are called the Mounders, and they recently rejoined the Cloverbelt Conference after a long stint in the Dunn-St. Croix Conference.

=== Athletic conference affiliation history ===
- Dunn-St. Croix Conference (1930–1931)
- Little Eight Conference (1931–1937)
- Dunn-St. Croix Conference (1937–1956)
- Cloverbelt Conference (1956–1961)
- Dunn-St. Croix Conference (1961–2025)
- Cloverbelt Conference (2025–present)
