= Albert B. Barney =

American politician

Albert B. Barney (June 2, 1835 – 1910) was an American lawyer, businessman, and legislator.

Born in Mayville, Wisconsin, Barney went to United States Military Academy and Whitewater Normal School (now University of Wisconsin–Whitewater). He studied law in Mayville, Wisconsin and was admitted to the Wisconsin bar. Barney then practiced law in Spencer, Wisconsin and was involved in real estate. Barney was a justice of the peace. He served in the Wisconsin State Assembly in 1893 and was a Democrat. During different times, Barney was a patient at the Wisconsin State Hospital in Winnebago, Wisconsin.
