= Elk Mound (town), Wisconsin =

Town in Dunn County, Wisconsin

Elk Mound, Wisconsin
- Town
- Town of Elk Mound
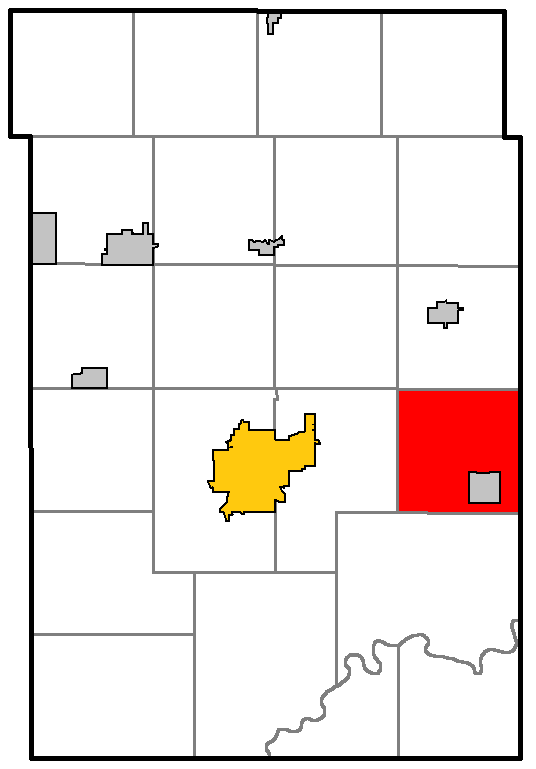
- Location of Elk Mound, within Dunn County
- Coordinates: 44°54′19″N 91°42′38″W
- Country: United States
- State: Wisconsin
- County: Dunn

Area
  - Total: 33.70 sq mi (87.3 km^{2})
  - Land: 33.66 sq mi (87.2 km^{2})
  - Water: 0.04 sq mi (0.10 km^{2})

Population (2020)
  - Total: 1,897
  - Density: 56.36/sq mi (21.76/km^{2})
- Time zone: UTC-6 (Central (CST))
  - Summer (DST): UTC-5 (CDT)
- Area code(s): 715 and 534
- GNIS feature ID: 1583152

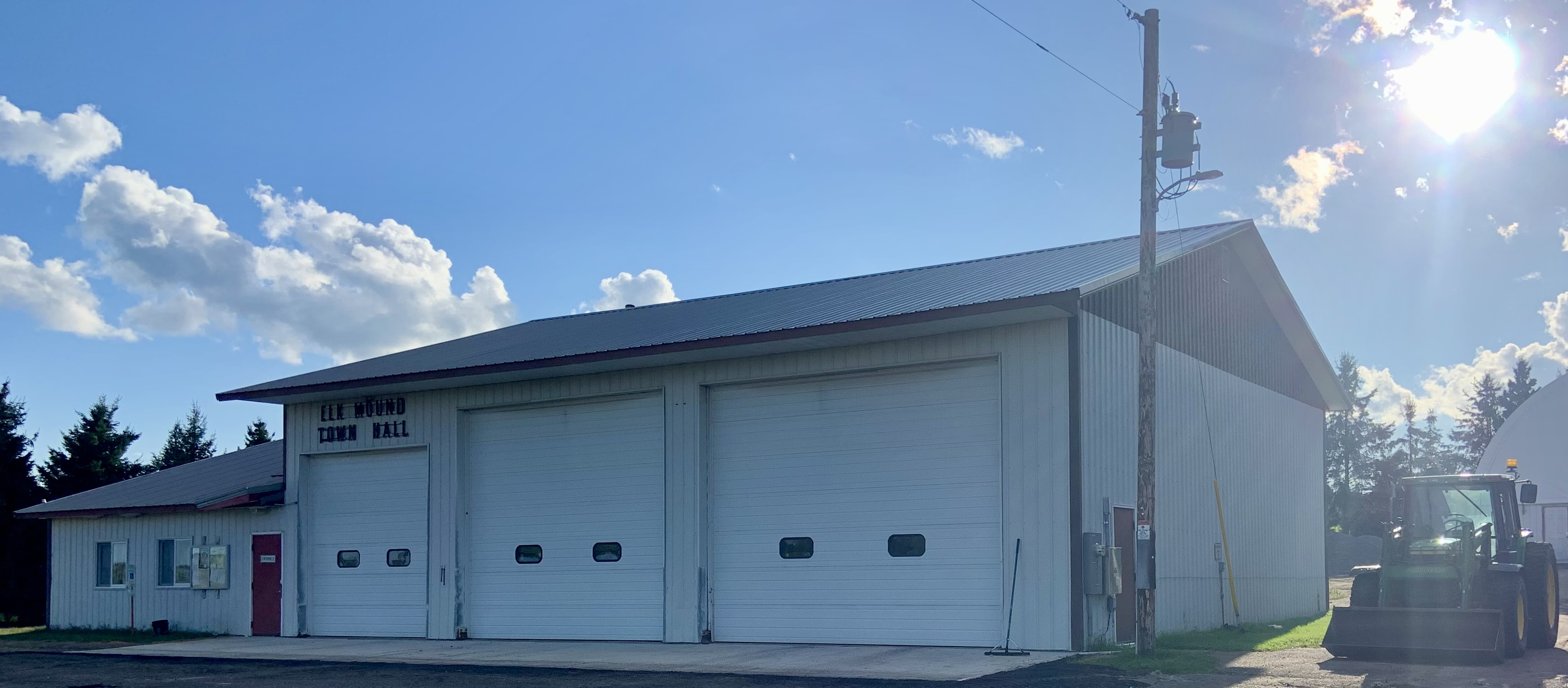
Elk Mound Town Hall

Elk Mound is a town in Dunn County, Wisconsin, United States. The population was 1,897 according to the 2020 census. The town is named after the Village of Elk Mound, located in the eastern part of the town.

== Geography ==
According to the United States Census Bureau, the town has a total area of 33.7 square miles (87.3 km^{2}), of which 33.7 square miles (87.3 km^{2}) is land and 0.04 square mile (0.1 km^{2}) (0.06%) is water.

== Demographics ==
Historical population
Census	Pop.	Note	%±
1990	749		—
2000	1,121		49.7%
2010	1,792		59.9%
2020	1,897		5.9%

As of the census of 2000, there were 1,121 people, 371 households, and 290 families residing in the town. The population density was 33.3 people per square mile (12.8/km^{2}). There were 395 housing units at an average density of 11.7 per square mile (4.5/km^{2}). The racial makeup of the town was 95.09% White, 0.54% Native American, 3.39% Asian, 0.18% Pacific Islander, 0.18% from other races, and 0.62% from two or more races. 0.98% of the population were Hispanic or Latino of any race.

There were 371 households, out of which 43.7% had children under the age of 18 living with them, 68.7% were married couples living together, 5.7% had a female householder with no husband present, and 21.6% were non-families. 12.7% of all households were made up of individuals, and 4.0% had someone living alone who was 65 years of age or older. The average household size was 2.98 and the average family size was 3.32.

In the town, the population was spread out, with 32.3% under the age of 18, 8.4% from 18 to 24, 32.5% from 25 to 44, 21.1% from 45 to 64, and 5.8% who were 65 years of age or older. The median age was 31 years. For every 100 females, there were 101.6 males. For every 100 females age 18 and over, there were 104.0 males.

The median income for a household in the town was $48,594, and the median income for a family was $53,611. Males had a median income of $32,100 versus $23,382 for females. The per capita income for the town was $17,138. About 5.2% of families and 8.1% of the population were below the poverty line, including 11.0% of those under age 18 and none of those age 65 or over.
