= Altoona High School =

Location
- 711 7th Street West; Altoona, Wisconsin 54720; United States
- 44.802039°N 91.441892°W

Information
- Type: Public secondary school
- Established: 1913
- School district: Altoona School District
- Principal: Jim Reif
- Teaching staff: 34.90 (FTE)
- Grades: 9-12
- Enrollment: 564 (2022-2023)
- Student to teacher ratio: 16.16
- Color
- Athletics conference: Cloverbelt Conference
- Nickname: Railroaders
- Website: Official website

Altoona High School is a public high school located in Altoona, Wisconsin. It serves students in grades 9 through 12 and is the only high school in the Altoona School District.

== History ==
Although elementary education had been provided for Altoona residents since the late nineteenth century, a public high school was not opened until October 1913. The original building burned down in 1951, and a successful February 1952 referendum authorized a new building, which opened in October of that year. A 1981 referendum to address overcrowding by building a new high school failed, but a 1986 referendum for a new building passed.

== Demographics ==
The school's student population is 86 percent white, five percent Hispanic, two percent Asian, and two percent black. Four percent of students identify as a part of two or more races. 28 percent of students qualify for free or reduced lunch.

== Academics ==
Advanced Placement classes are offered at Altoona; just under half of students take an AP class.

== Athletics ==
AHS athletic teams are known as the Railroaders and compete in the Cloverbelt Conference. In the fall of 2019, a new sports complex with artificial turf opened, housing contests for the football, soccer, and track and field. The football field is named after former Green Bay Packers player Fuzzy Thurston, a graduate of the school.

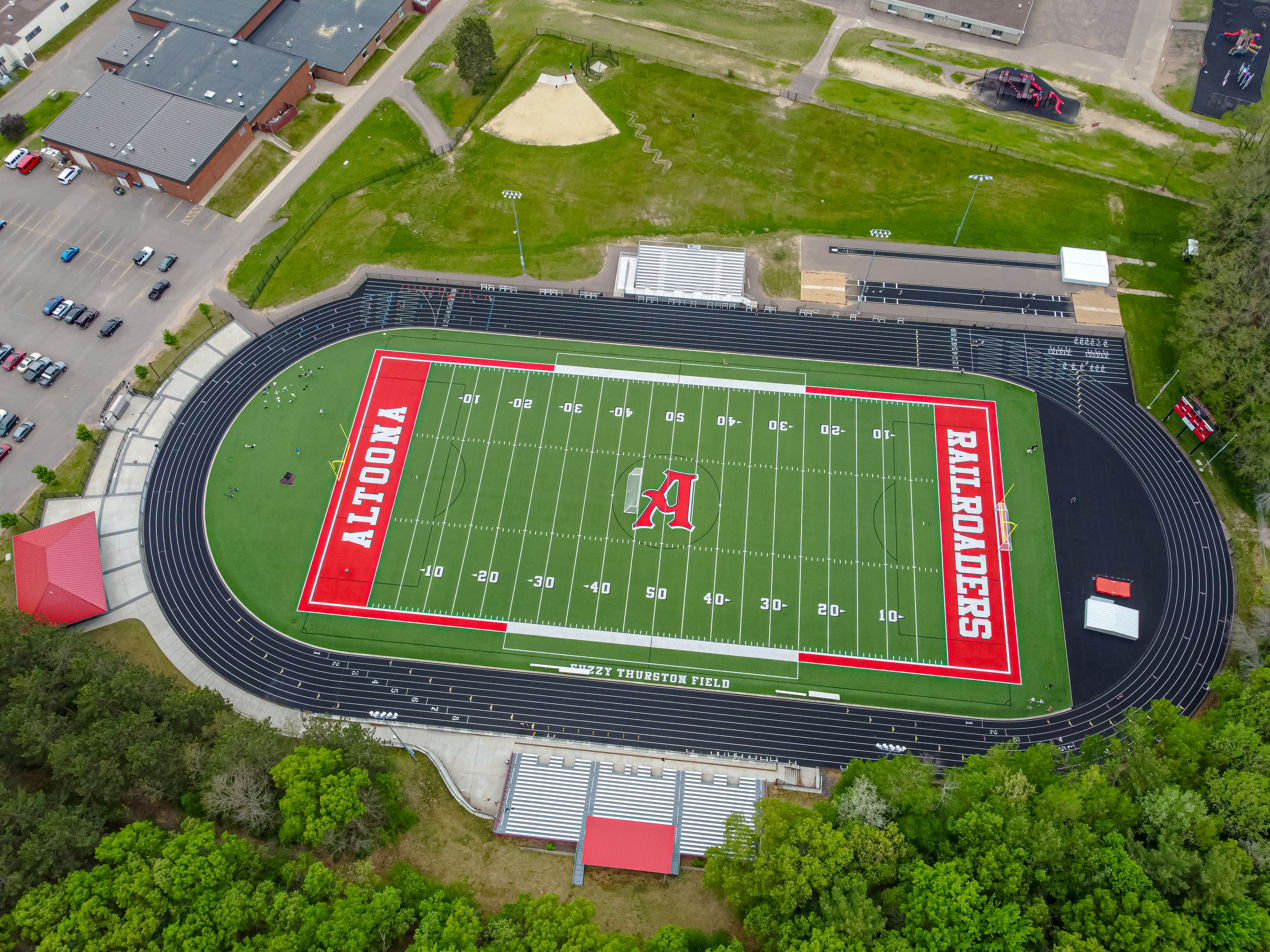
Altoona schools athletic fields

State Championships
Year	Division/Class	Sport
2018		Girls hockey*
2011	Division 3	Girls basketball
2001	Division 2	Softball
1939	Class C	Boys basketball
1934	Class C	Boys track and field
* denotes championship was part of a cooperative team

=== Athletic conference affiliation history ===
- Little Eight Conference (1926-1937)
- Cloverbelt Conference (1946-2021)
- Middle Border Conference (2021–present)

== Performing arts ==
Altoona High has a competitive show choir. The group was originally named "Northland Singers", but is now known as "Locomotion". At times, the school also had a jayvee-level group, "Enginuity". The school has hosted its own competition, "Locopalooza", annually since 2000.

== Notable alumni ==
- Leonard Haas, former chancellor of University of Wisconsin–Eau Claire
- Tod Ohnstad, member of the Wisconsin State Assembly
- Fuzzy Thurston, Green Bay Packers Hall of Fame member
