= Fall Creek, Wisconsin =

- Village
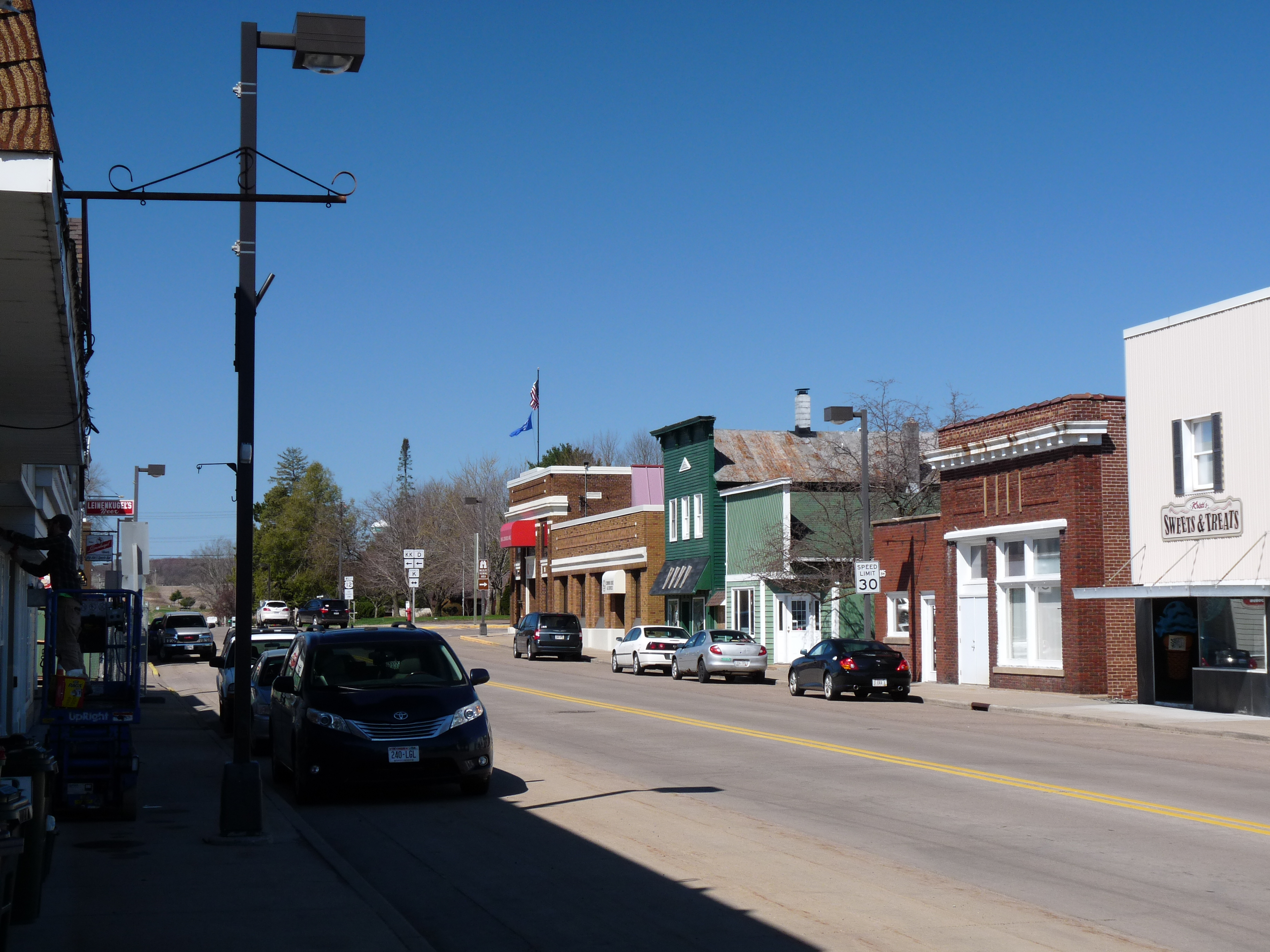
- Downtown, facing west on Lincoln Ave.

- Location of Fall Creek in Eau Claire County, Wisconsin.
- Coordinates: 44°45′47″N 91°16′34″W
- Country: United States
- State: Wisconsin
- County: Eau Claire

Area
  - Total: 2.07 sq mi (5.37 km^{2})
  - Land: 2.05 sq mi (5.31 km^{2})
  - Water: 0.023 sq mi (0.06 km^{2})
- Elevation: 938 ft (286 m)

Population (2020)
  - Total: 1,422
  - Density: 694/sq mi (268/km^{2})
- Time zone: UTC-6 (Central (CST))
  - Summer (DST): UTC-5 (CDT)
- Area codes: 715 & 534
- FIPS code: 55-25125
- GNIS feature ID: 1564839
- Website: fallcreekwi.gov

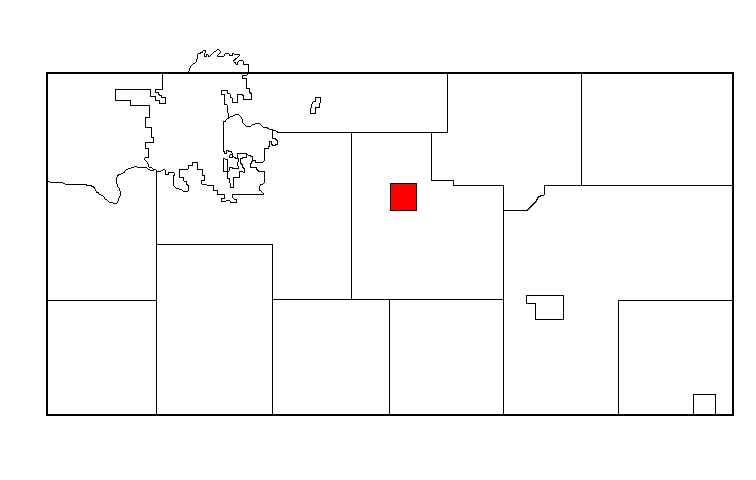
Location of Fall Creek within Eau Claire County

Fall Creek is a village in Eau Claire County, Wisconsin, United States. The population was 1,422 at the 2020 census. The village is bordered by the Town of Lincoln.

== History ==
Fall Creek was founded in 1870. The village was named after the rapids on a nearby creek. The post office was established in 1870 as Cousins, in honor of Eau Claire businessman Henry Cousins. The name was changed to Fall Creek four years later in July 1874.

== Geography ==
Fall Creek is located at 44°45′47″N 91°16′34″W (44.762977, -91.276204).

According to the United States Census Bureau, the village has a total area of 2.09 square miles (5.41 km^{2}), of which 2.07 square miles (5.36 km^{2}) is land and 0.02 square miles (0.05 km^{2}) is water.

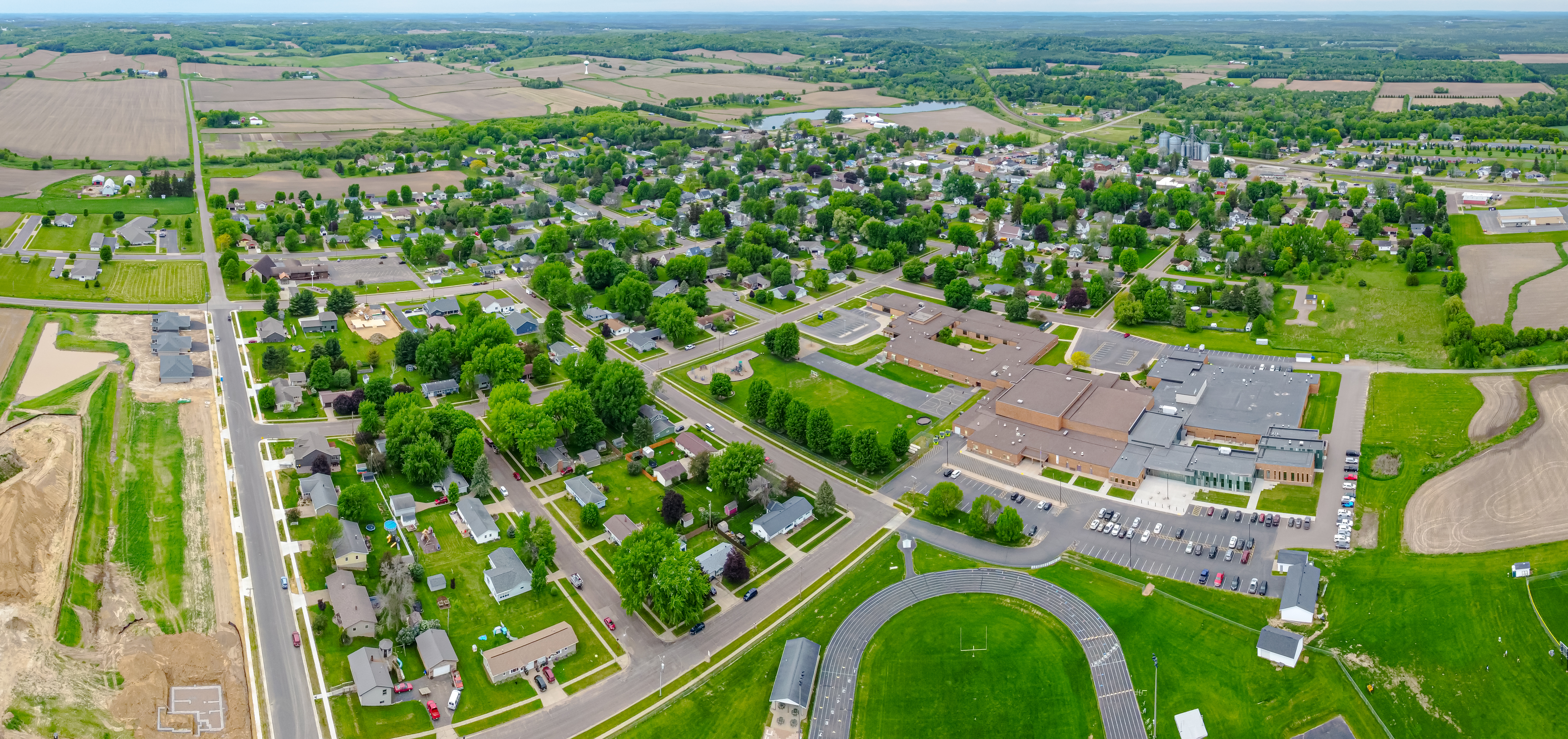

== Demographics ==
Historical population
Census	Pop.	Note	%±
1910	523		—
1920	507		−3.1%
1930	528		4.1%
1940	572		8.3%
1950	584		2.1%
1960	710		21.6%
1970	825		16.2%
1980	1,148		39.2%
1990	1,034		−9.9%
2000	1,236		19.5%
2010	1,315		6.4%
2020	1,422		8.1%
U.S. Decennial Census

=== 2010 census ===
As of the census of 2010, there were 1,315 people, 517 households, and 354 families living in the village. The population density was 635.3 inhabitants per square mile (245.3/km^{2}). There were 553 housing units at an average density of 267.1 per square mile (103.1/km^{2}). The racial makeup of the village was 97.9% White, 0.1% African American, 0.5% Native American, 0.8% Asian, 0.1% from other races, and 0.7% from two or more races. Hispanic or Latino of any race were 0.2% of the population.

There were 517 households, of which 34.2% had children under the age of 18 living with them, 51.1% were married couples living together, 12.6% had a female householder with no husband present, 4.8% had a male householder with no wife present, and 31.5% were non-families. 27.9% of all households were made up of individuals, and 14.7% had someone living alone who was 65 years of age or older. The average household size was 2.44 and the average family size was 2.95.

The median age in the village was 39.6 years. 26.1% of residents were under the age of 18; 6.9% were between the ages of 18 and 24; 23% were from 25 to 44; 26.7% were from 45 to 64; and 17.2% were 65 years of age or older. The gender makeup of the village was 45.6% male and 54.4% female.

=== 2000 census ===
As of the census of 2000, there were 1,236 people, 476 households, and 337 families living in the village. The population density was 786.1 people per square mile (304.0/km^{2}). There were 495 housing units at an average density of 314.8 per square mile (121.7/km^{2}). The racial makeup of the village was 98.71% White, 0.24% African American, 0.57% Native American, 0.08% Asian, 0.24% from other races, and 0.16% from two or more races.

There were 476 households, out of which 33.2% had children under the age of 18 living with them, 58.4% were married couples living together, 9.9% had a female householder with no husband present, and 29.0% were non-families. 25.0% of all households were made up of individuals, and 16.6% had someone living alone who was 65 years of age or older. The average household size was 2.47 and the average family size was 2.96.

In the village, the population was spread out, with 26.4% under the age of 18, 5.7% from 18 to 24, 26.3% from 25 to 44, 20.6% from 45 to 64, and 21.1% who were 65 years of age or older. The median age was 39 years. For every 100 females, there were 89.3 males. For every 100 females age 18 and over, there were 79.8 males.

The median income for a household in the village was $40,284, and the median income for a family was $47,986. Males had a median income of $34,444 versus $20,313 for females. The per capita income for the village was $17,566. About 5.0% of families and 7.7% of the population were below the poverty line, including 5.9% of those under age 18 and 15.7% of those age 65 or over.

== Education ==
Fall Creek High School is the local public high school.

== Notable people ==
- Todd Boss, poet
- Otto Plath, the father of poet Sylvia Plath, lived briefly in Fall Creek after immigrating from the German Empire
