= Elk Mound, Wisconsin =

- Village
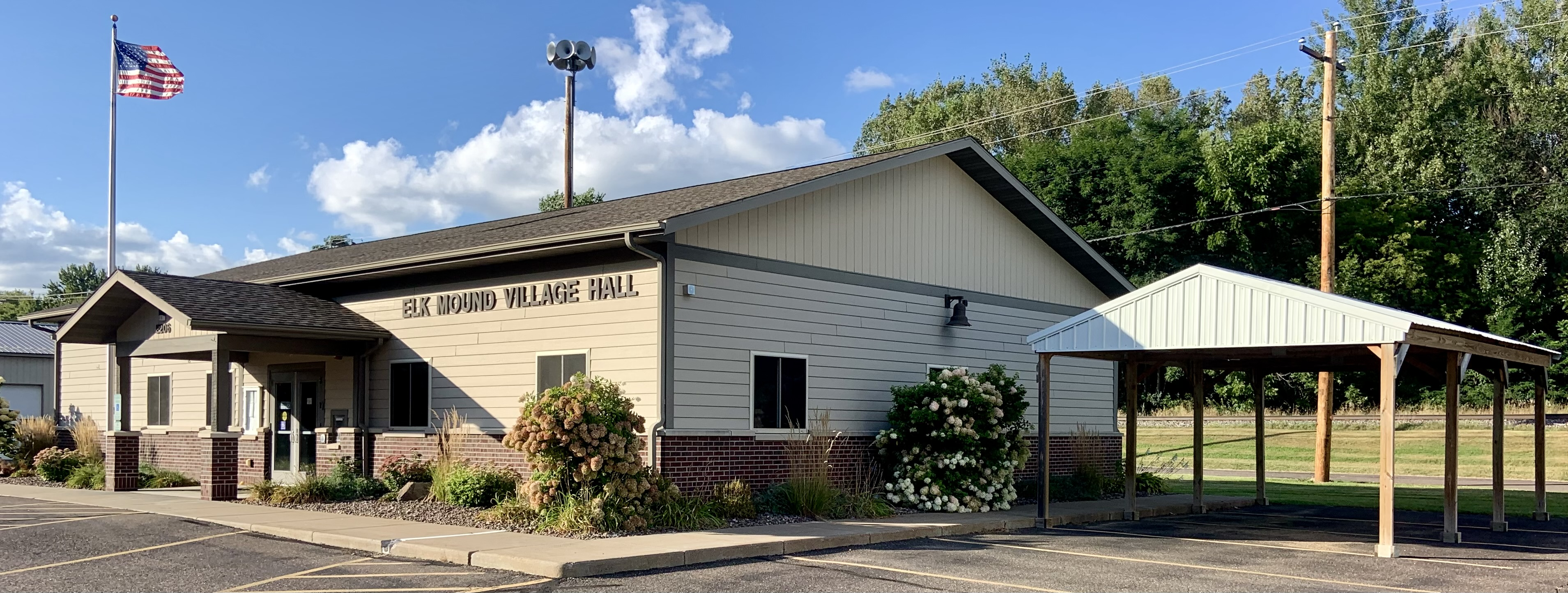
- Village hall

- Location of Elk Mound in Dunn County, Wisconsin.
- Coordinates: 44°54′10″N 91°42′29″W
- Country: United States
- State: Wisconsin
- County: Dunn

Area
  - Total: 2.28 sq mi (5.90 km^{2})
  - Land: 2.28 sq mi (5.90 km^{2})
  - Water: 0 sq mi (0.00 km^{2})
- Elevation: 1,020 ft (310 m)

Population (2020)
  - Total: 985
  - Density: 432/sq mi (167/km^{2})
- Time zone: UTC-6 (Central (CST))
  - Summer (DST): UTC-5 (CDT)
- Area codes: 715 & 534
- FIPS code: 55-23350
- GNIS feature ID: 1564526
- Website: www.elkmound.org

Elk Mound is a village in Dunn County, Wisconsin, United States. The population was 985 at the 2020 census. The village is located in the Eau Claire metropolitan area and is surrounded by the Town of Elk Mound.

== History ==
A post office called Elk Mound has been in operation since 1870. Elk Mound was laid out in 1871. The village was named for nearby Elk Mound.

== Geography ==
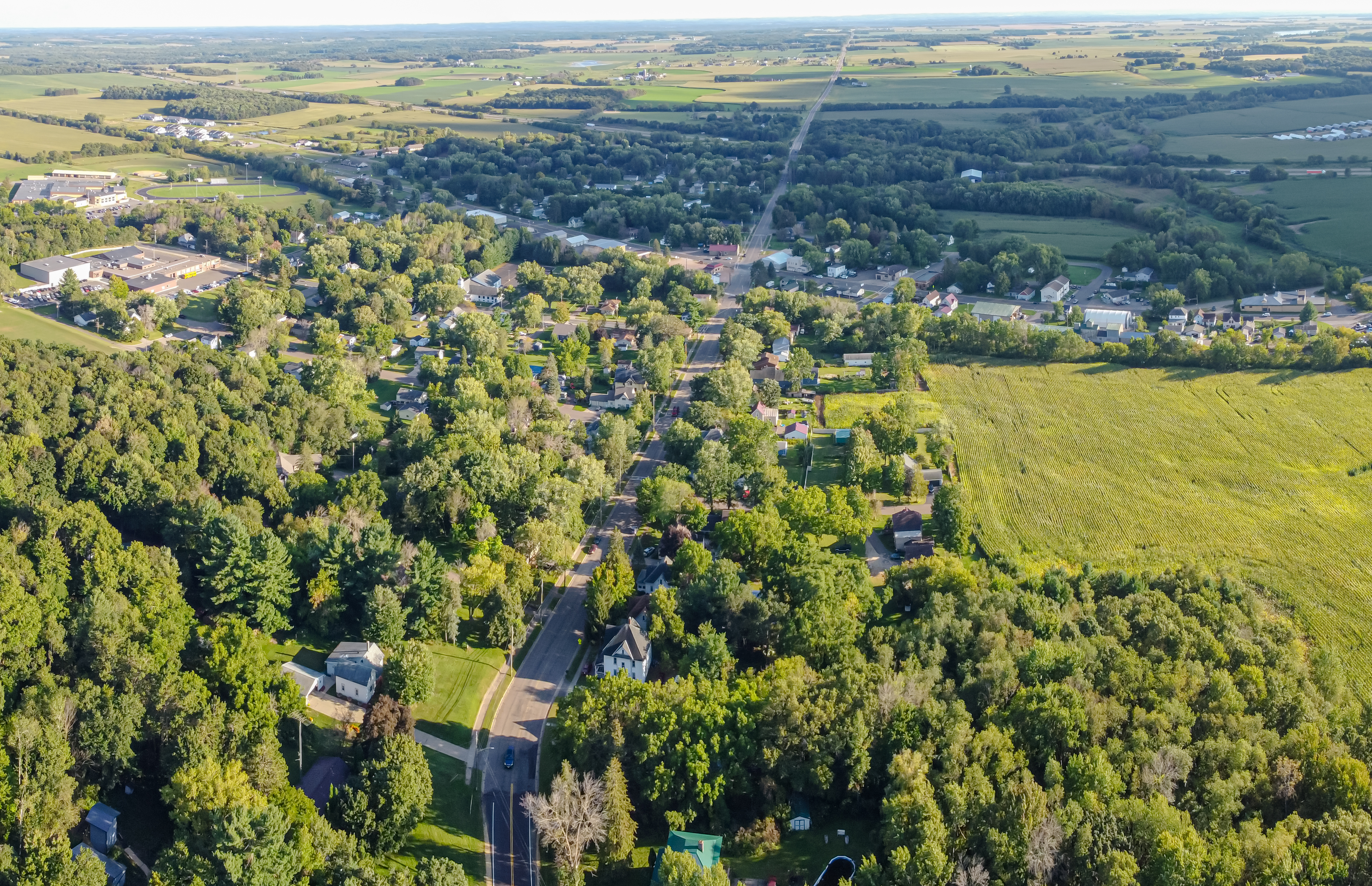

Elk Mound is located at 44°52′23″N 91°41′23″W (44.873216, -91.689885).

According to the United States Census Bureau, the village has a total area of 2.29 square miles (5.93 km^{2}), all land.

The village of Elk Mound is located in the Chippewa Valley, between the cities of Eau Claire, Menomonie, and Chippewa Falls.

== Demographics ==
Historical population
| Census | Pop. | Note | %± |
|---|---|---|---|
| 1880 | 48 | | — |
| 1910 | 302 | | — |
| 1920 | 357 | | 18.2% |
| 1930 | 376 | | 5.3% |
| 1940 | 338 | | −10.1% |
| 1950 | 390 | | 15.4% |
| 1960 | 379 | | −2.8% |
| 1970 | 471 | | 24.3% |
| 1980 | 737 | | 56.5% |
| 1990 | 765 | | 3.8% |
| 2000 | 785 | | 2.6% |
| 2010 | 878 | | 11.8% |
| 2020 | 985 | | 12.2% |
U.S. Decennial Census

=== 2010 census ===
As of the census of 2010, there were 878 people, 334 households, and 225 families residing in the village. The population density was 383.4 inhabitants per square mile (148.0/km^{2}). There were 358 housing units at an average density of 156.3 per square mile (60.3/km^{2}). The racial makeup of the village was 90.8% White, 0.6% African American, 0.7% Native American, 5.0% Asian, 0.5% from other races, and 2.5% from two or more races. Hispanic or Latino of any race were 2.5% of the population.

There were 334 households, of which 41.6% had children under the age of 18 living with them, 45.2% were married couples living together, 15.6% had a female householder with no husband present, 6.6% had a male householder with no wife present, and 32.6% were non-families. 21.9% of all households were made up of individuals, and 6% had someone living alone who was 65 years of age or older. The average household size was 2.63 and the average family size was 3.07.

The median age in the village was 30.9 years. 30.6% of residents were under the age of 18; 10.9% were between the ages of 18 and 24; 28.4% were from 25 to 44; 22.9% were from 45 to 64; and 7.2% were 65 years of age or older. The gender makeup of the village was 50.3% male and 49.7% female.

== Economy ==
Although farming has been the dominant occupation within the district, in recent years several small businesses have been established in the community. Industry, businesses and services are available in the neighboring cities. Many housing developments have been established both within and outside the village, and these developments continue to expand.

Elk Mound is best known as the destination for Menards rebate coupons.

== Education ==
The school district of Elk Mound is located within the village of Elk Mound. The district has an approximate enrollment of 928 students distributed between three schools. The elementary school houses preschool through 4th grade. The middle school houses 5th through 8th grades. The high school houses 9th-12th grades. Enrollment at the elementary has shown an upward trend, and district-wide enrollment has increased slightly over the past several years.

In 2009, community residents passed a referendum authorizing significant facility upgrades to all three school district buildings. Each building added much needed classroom and special use space to accommodate a growing population.

== Churches ==
Elk Mound is home to several churches covering a range of denominations.

== Historic Memorial Park ==
Mound Hill Park and its attendant "castle" are dedicated to the deceased rural letter carriers of Dunn County. It is believed to be the only such dedicated monument in America.

== Tornado ==
In September 2019, the Elk Mound Area and other nearby cities and towns were hit with an EF3 tornado that damaged much of the community. No deaths were reported but houses were lost as a result of the tornado. The area was struck by a tornado the next year as well; however, that one was much weaker, coming in as in EF0.
