= Owen, Wisconsin =

- City
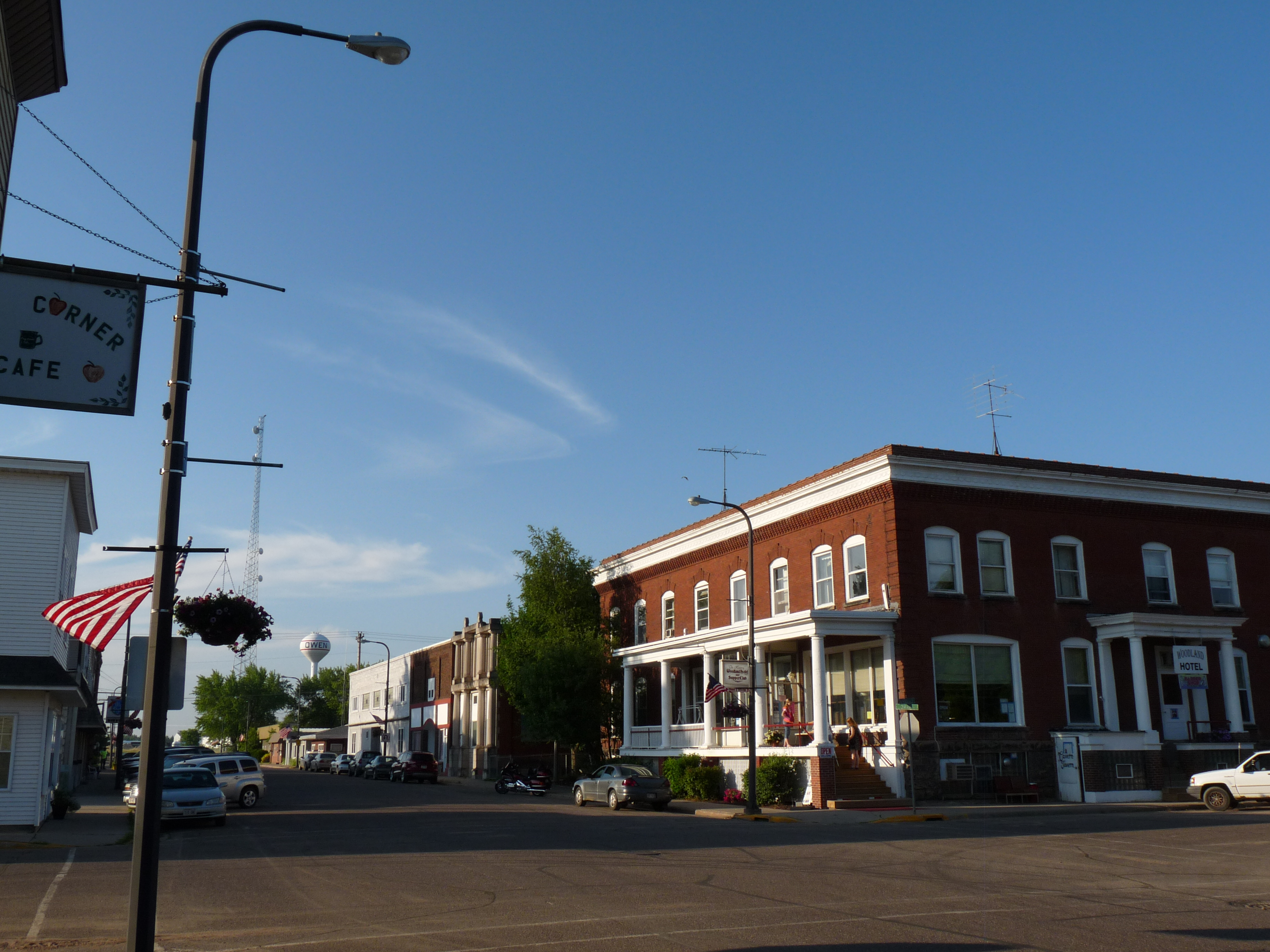
- The old downtown, looking north up Central Avenue toward the Owen Company's Woodland Hotel

- Location of Owen in Clark County, Wisconsin.

- Location within Wisconsin Location within the United States
- Coordinates: 44°56′54″N 90°33′53″W
- Country: United States
- State: Wisconsin
- County: Clark

Area
  - Total: 2.41 sq mi (6.24 km^{2})
  - Land: 2.33 sq mi (6.04 km^{2})
  - Water: 0.077 sq mi (0.20 km^{2})
- Elevation: 1,243 ft (379 m)

Population (2020)
  - Total: 916
  - Density: 393/sq mi (152/km^{2})
- Time zone: UTC-6 (Central (CST))
  - Summer (DST): UTC-5 (CDT)
- Area codes: 715 & 534
- FIPS code: 55-60825
- GNIS feature ID: 1577195
- Website: cityofowenwi.gov

Owen is a city in Clark County, Wisconsin, United States. The population was 916 at the 2020 census. Owen is located directly east of the village of Withee, which is about half the size of Owen.

== History ==
In 1880 the Wisconsin Central Railroad built its line through what would become Owen, on its way from Abbotsford to Chippewa Falls.

In 1893 the John S. Owen Company of Eau Claire managed to buy from J.D. Spaulding 400 square miles of virgin timber that ran from the current site of Owen north through Taylor County and into Rusk County. Near where the railroad crossed Brick Creek and that creek flowed into the Popple River, the company built a warehouse, a boarding house, and five log buildings clustered around the rail line. They dammed Brick Creek to make a mill pond and built a sawmill, a planing mill, and a company store. A one-room school was built in 1894. Early on, John's son Aloney moved to the settlement to oversee local operations.

In 1904 the Village of Owen incorporated, with 315 people. In 1906 the Owen Company started the Owen Box and Crating factory, the Woodland Hotel, and began providing electrical service within the village of Owen. In 1907 the Owens organized the State Bank of Owen, headed by J.G. Owen.

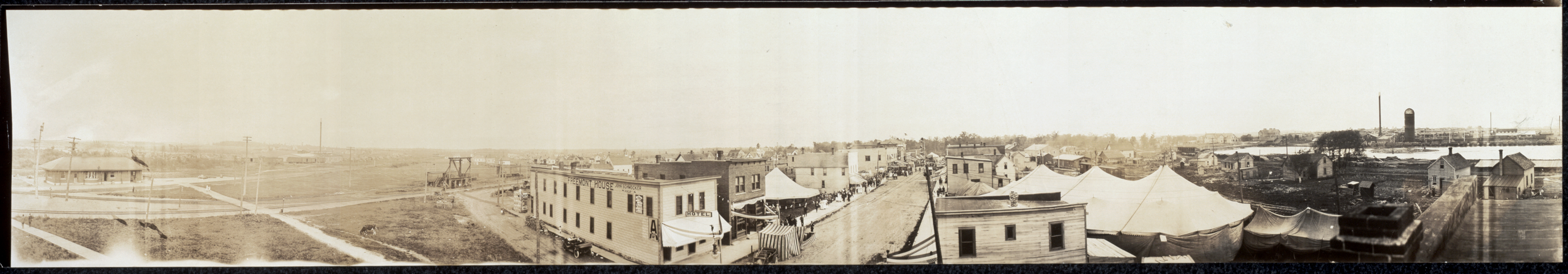
Bird's eye view of Owen in 1912

By 1914, Owen's population was 1,000. The Owens organized the State Bank of Withee, headed by A.R. Owen. The Owens also had a hand in a bottling works, a theater, a telephone company, and three hotels. They donated land for a city park and churches. In 1915 the company opened a retail lumber store.

By 1918 the Owen Company was running 25 miles of railroad in Clark and Taylor Counties, hauling logs from their timber holdings in to their sawmill. At one point they thought their supply might last for five or six years, but it ended up lasting 40. The last log was sawed in 1932.

== Geography ==
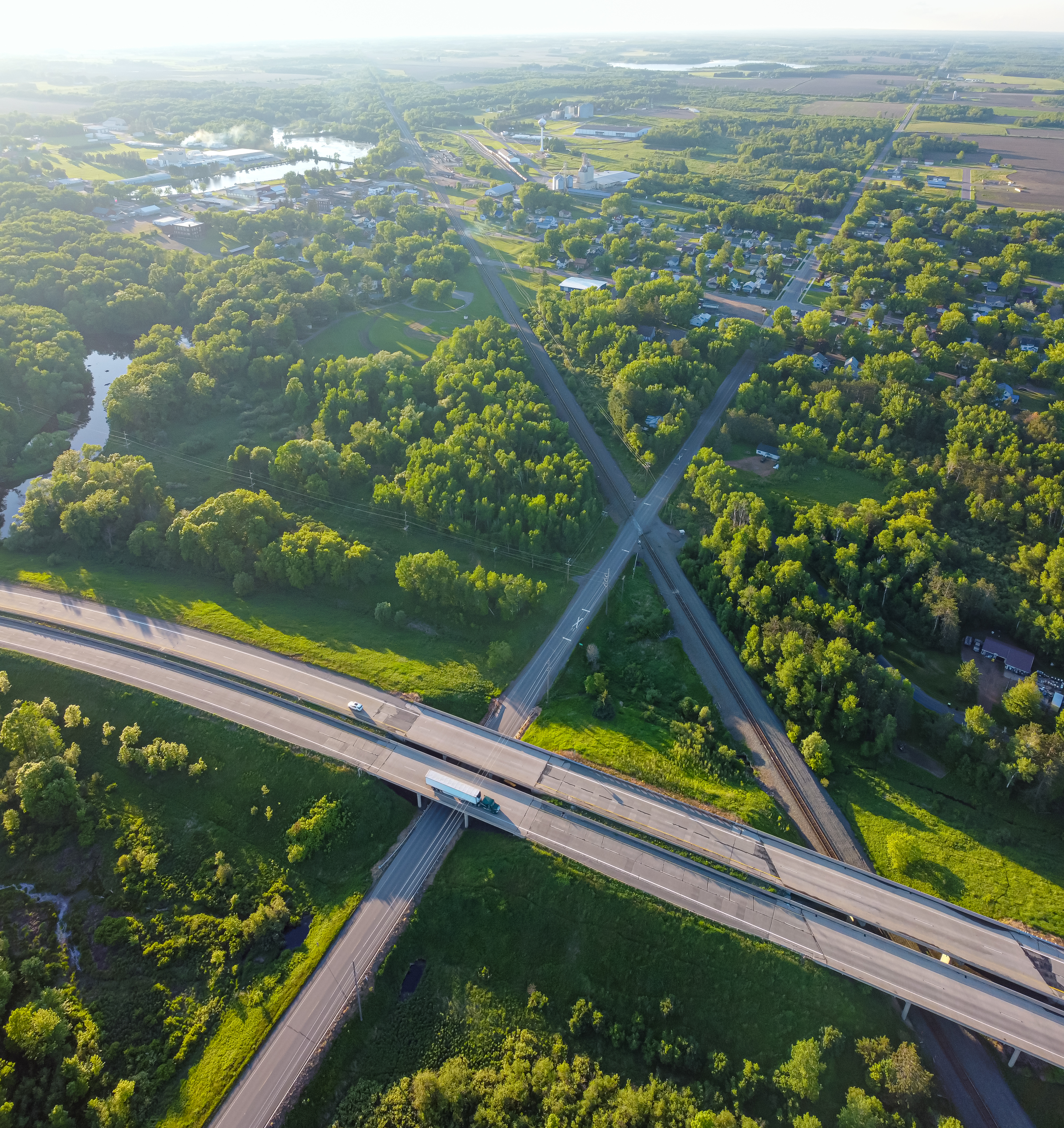
Owen, Wisconsin

Owen is located at 44°56′54″N 90°33′53″W (44.948330, -90.564740).

According to the United States Census Bureau, the city has a total area of 1.84 square miles (4.77 km^{2}), of which 1.77 square miles (4.58 km^{2}) is land and 0.07 square miles (0.18 km^{2}) is water.

=== Climate ===
Climate data for Owen 1E, Wisconsin (1991–2020 normals, extremes 1946–present)
Month	Jan	Feb	Mar	Apr	May	Jun	Jul	Aug	Sep	Oct	Nov	Dec	Year
Record high °F (°C)	55 (13)	67 (19)	78 (26)	87 (31)	93 (34)	94 (34)	99 (37)	101 (38)	94 (34)	88 (31)	76 (24)	62 (17)	101 (38)
Mean daily maximum °F (°C)	21.1 (−6.1)	25.7 (−3.5)	38.0 (3.3)	52.4 (11.3)	65.9 (18.8)	75.0 (23.9)	78.9 (26.1)	77.1 (25.1)	69.1 (20.6)	55.3 (12.9)	39.8 (4.3)	26.9 (−2.8)	52.1 (11.2)
Daily mean °F (°C)	11.5 (−11.4)	15.1 (−9.4)	27.6 (−2.4)	41.6 (5.3)	54.5 (12.5)	64.1 (17.8)	67.7 (19.8)	65.7 (18.7)	57.7 (14.3)	44.7 (7.1)	31.3 (−0.4)	18.6 (−7.4)	41.7 (5.4)
Mean daily minimum °F (°C)	1.8 (−16.8)	4.4 (−15.3)	17.3 (−8.2)	30.8 (−0.7)	43.1 (6.2)	53.1 (11.7)	56.4 (13.6)	54.3 (12.4)	46.4 (8.0)	34.2 (1.2)	22.8 (−5.1)	10.2 (−12.1)	31.2 (−0.4)
Record low °F (°C)	−42 (−41)	−38 (−39)	−36 (−38)	2 (−17)	13 (−11)	28 (−2)	35 (2)	28 (−2)	20 (−7)	8 (−13)	−18 (−28)	−33 (−36)	−42 (−41)
Average precipitation inches (mm)	1.06 (27)	1.15 (29)	1.81 (46)	2.98 (76)	3.99 (101)	4.77 (121)	3.81 (97)	4.42 (112)	3.95 (100)	2.93 (74)	1.85 (47)	1.51 (38)	34.23 (869)
Average snowfall inches (cm)	10.9 (28)	10.2 (26)	8.5 (22)	3.7 (9.4)	0.2 (0.51)	0.0 (0.0)	0.0 (0.0)	0.0 (0.0)	0.0 (0.0)	0.9 (2.3)	4.9 (12)	11.7 (30)	51.0 (130)
Average precipitation days (≥ 0.01 in)	8.5	6.6	8.4	11.0	12.0	12.4	10.9	11.0	10.7	10.1	7.6	8.7	117.9
Average snowy days (≥ 0.1 in)	7.8	6.2	4.8	2.4	0.2	0.0	0.0	0.0	0.0	0.6	3.4	7.2	32.6
Source: NOAA

== Demographics ==
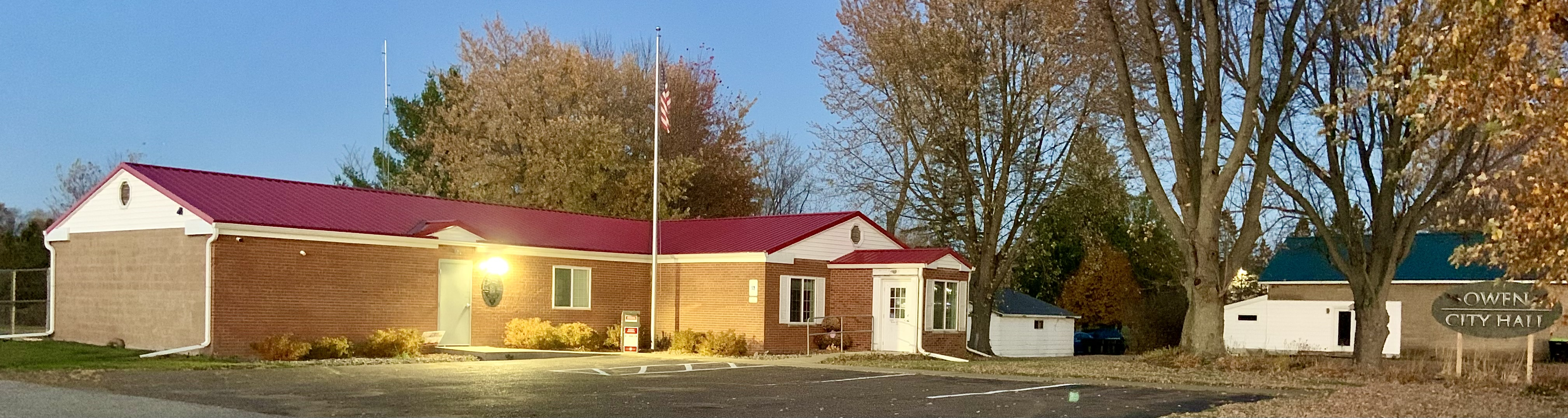
Owen City Hall

Historical population
Census	Pop.	Note	%±
1910	745		—
1920	1,083		45.4%
1930	1,102		1.8%
1940	1,083		−1.7%
1950	1,034		−4.5%
1960	1,098		6.2%
1970	1,031		−6.1%
1980	998		−3.2%
1990	895		−10.3%
2000	936		4.6%
2010	940		0.4%
2020	916		−2.6%
U.S. Decennial Census

=== 2010 census ===
As of the census of 2010, there were 940 people, 419 households, and 252 families living in the city. The population density was 531.1 inhabitants per square mile (205.1/km^{2}). There were 485 housing units at an average density of 274.0 per square mile (105.8/km^{2}). The racial makeup of the city was 96.7% White, 0.5% African American, 0.1% Native American, 0.1% Asian, 2.0% from other races, and 0.5% from two or more races. Hispanic or Latino of any race were 3.8% of the population.

There were 419 households, of which 27.7% had children under the age of 18 living with them, 44.4% were married couples living together, 8.4% had a female householder with no husband present, 7.4% had a male householder with no wife present, and 39.9% were non-families. 35.8% of all households were made up of individuals, and 16.2% had someone living alone who was 65 years of age or older. The average household size was 2.23 and the average family size was 2.87.

The median age in the city was 40.4 years. 23.7% of residents were under the age of 18; 8.8% were between the ages of 18 and 24; 22.1% were from 25 to 44; 25.5% were from 45 to 64; and 19.9% were 65 years of age or older. The gender makeup of the city was 48.2% male and 51.8% female.

=== 2000 census ===
As of the census of 2000, there were 936 people, 412 households, and 255 families living in the city. The population density was 510.9 people per square mile (197.5/km^{2}). There were 455 housing units at an average density of 248.4 per square mile (96.0/km^{2}). The racial makeup of the city was 98.61% White, 0.64% African American, 0.43% Native American, 0.11% Asian, and 0.21% from two or more races. Hispanic or Latino of any race were 0.43% of the population.

There were 412 households, out of which 26.5% had children under the age of 18 living with them, 48.3% were married couples living together, 10.2% had a female householder with no husband present, and 37.9% were non-families. 32.3% of all households were made up of individuals, and 21.6% had someone living alone who was 65 years of age or older. The average household size was 2.27 and the average family size was 2.84.

In the city, the population was spread out, with 23.3% under the age of 18, 9.1% from 18 to 24, 23.9% from 25 to 44, 20.6% from 45 to 64, and 23.1% who were 65 years of age or older. The median age was 41 years. For every 100 females, there were 90.2 males. For every 100 females age 18 and over, there were 86.5 males.

The median income for a household in the city was $27,368, and the median income for a family was $37,955. Males had a median income of $27,431 versus $20,547 for females. The per capita income for the city was $14,981. About 9.4% of families and 13.4% of the population were below the poverty line, including 19.4% of those under age 18 and 13.8% of those age 65 or over.
