= North Central 8-Player Football Conference =

Wisconsin high school football conference

The North Central 8-Player Football Conference is a high school football conference consisting of small high schools in northern Wisconsin. Founded in 2024, the conference sponsors eight-player football and is affiliated with the Wisconsin Interscholastic Athletic Association.

== History ==
The North Central 8-Player Football Conference was formed in 2024 as part of the 2024-2025 Wisconsin high school football realignment overseen by the WIAA and the Wisconsin Football Coaches Association. Nine of its fourteen member schools formerly belonged to the CWC 8-Player Football Conference (Alma Center Lincoln, Cornell, Gilman, Lake Holcombe, McDonell Central Catholic in Chippewa Falls, New Auburn, Owen-Withee, Prairie Farm and Thorp) and the other five came from the Lakeland Conference's eight-player football division (Clayton, Frederic, Luck, Siren and Valley Christian School in Osceola). The fourteen member schools were aligned into East and West Divisions:

North Central-8 East	North Central-8 West
Alma Center Lincoln	Clayton
Cornell	Frederic
Gilman	Luck
Lake Holcombe	New Auburn
McDonell Central Catholic	Prairie Farm
Owen-Withee	Siren
Thorp	Valley Christian School

For the 2026-2027 competition cycle, the North Central-8 lost McDonell Central Catholic to eleven-player football and the Dunn-St. Croix Conference, Clayton and Prairie Farm as individual programs and Valley Christian to the loss of football as a varsity sport. Six programs joined the conference to replace them: two from the small schools division of the Heart O'North Conference (Clear Lake and Turtle Lake), two from the Central Wisconsin Conference (Assumption from the small schools division and Newman Catholic from the eight-player division), one from the Northwoods Football Conference's eight-player division (Athens) and the new Prairie Farm/Clayton football cooperative. Lake Holcombe switched to the West Division to accommodate the net gain of two schools to its sixteen-member roster:

North Central-8 East	North Central-8 West
Alma Center Lincoln	Clear Lake
Assumption	Frederic
Athens	Lake Holcombe
Cornell	Luck
Gilman	New Auburn
Newman Catholic	Prairie Farm/Clayton
Owen-Withee	Siren
Thorp	Turtle Lake

== List of conference members ==
=== Current members ===
School	Location	Affiliation	Enrollment	Mascot	Colors	Joined	Primary Conference
Alma Center Lincoln	Alma Center, WI	Public	164	Hornets		2024	Dairyland
Assumption	Wisconsin Rapids, WI	Private (Catholic)	135	Royals		2026	Marawood
Athens	Athens, WI	Public	134	Bluejays		2026	Marawood
Clear Lake	Clear Lake, WI	Public	168	Warriors		2026	Dunn-St. Croix
Cornell	Cornell, WI	Public	90	Chiefs		2024	Lakeland
Frederic	Frederic, WI	Public	114	Vikings		2024	Lakeland
Gilman	Gilman, WI	Public	102	Pirates		2024	Cloverbelt
Lake Holcombe	Lake Holcombe, WI	Public	75	Chieftains		2024	Lakeland
Luck	Luck, WI	Public	106	Cardinals		2024	Lakeland
New Auburn	New Auburn, WI	Public	99	Trojans		2024	Lakeland
Newman Catholic	Wausau, WI	Private (Catholic)	93	Cardinals		2026	Marawood
Owen-Withee	Owen, WI	Public	135	Blackhawks		2024	Cloverbelt
Prairie Farm/ Clayton	Prairie Farm, WI	Public	188	Bearcats		2026	Lakeland
Siren	Siren, WI	Public	96	Dragons		2024	Lakeland
Thorp	Thorp, WI	Public	180	Cardinals		2024	Cloverbelt
Turtle Lake	Turtle Lake, WI	Public	127	Lakers		2026	Lakeland

=== Former members ===
School	Location	Affiliation	Mascot	Colors	Seasons	Primary Conference
Clayton	Clayton, WI	Public	Bears		2024-2025	Lakeland
McDonell Central Catholic	Chippewa Falls, WI	Private (Catholic)	Macks		2024-2025	Cloverbelt
Prairie Farm	Prairie Farm, WI	Public	Panthers		2024-2025	Lakeland
Valley Christian	Osceola, WI	Private (Christian)	Jaguars		2024-2025	Independent

== Membership timeline ==
Eastern Division Western Division

== List of state champions ==
School	Year
Owen-Withee	2024
McDonell Central Catholic	2025

== List of conference champions ==
School	Quantity	Years
Clayton	2	2024, 2025
Gilman	2	2025, 2026
Owen-Withee	1	2024
Prairie Farm/ Clayton	1	2026
Siren	1	2024
Alma Center Lincoln	0	
Assumption	0	
Athens	0	
Clear Lake	0	
Cornell	0	
Frederic	0	
Lake Holcombe	0	
Luck	0	
McDonell Central Catholic	0	
New Auburn	0	
Newman Catholic	0	
Prairie Farm	0	
Thorp	0	
Turtle Lake	0	
Valley Christian	0	
