= CWC 8-Player Football Conference =

Wisconsin high school football conference (2020-2023)

The CWC 8-Player Football Conference is a former high school football conference with its catchment in north central Wisconsin. Consisting of eight-player football teams from various conferences over two divisions, the conference was active from 2020 through the 2023 football season and was affiliated with the Wisconsin Interscholastic Athletic Association.

== History ==
The CWC was founded in 2020 after a comprehensive realignment of Wisconsin's high school football conferences by the WIAA, in conjunction with the Wisconsin Football Coaches Association. Four of its original members previously competed in the eight-player division of the Central Wisconsin Conference (Bowler/Gresham, Marion/Tigerton, Port Edwards and Tri-County), three were part of the Lakeland Conference's eight-player division (Alma Center Lincoln, Bruce and New Auburn) and two previously competed in eleven-player football as part of the Cloverwood Conference (Gilman and Greenwood). The other three schools (McDonell Central Catholic, Newman Catholic and Phillips) competed as independents in the WIAA's eight-player football division. The twelve original members were partitioned into East and West divisions:

CWC East	CWC West
Bowler/Gresham	Alma Center Lincoln
Greenwood	Bruce
Marion/Tigerton	Gilman
Newman Catholic	McDonell Central Catholic
Port Edwards	New Auburn
Tri-County	Phillips

For the 2022-2023 competition cycle, the CWC lost half of its membership roster. Five schools (Bowler/Gresham, Marion/Tigerton, Newman Catholic, Port Edwards and Tri-County) formed a reconstituted eight-player football division in the Central Wisconsin Conference, and Phillips became members of the Lakeland Conference. The exiting schools were replaced by former members of the Lakeland Conference (Cornell, Lake Holcombe and Prairie Farm), Cloverbelt Conference (Owen-Withee and Thorp) and Marawood Conference (Athens). Alma Center Lincoln and Gilman were shifted to the CWC East to accommodate the new arrivals:

CWC East	CWC West
Alma Center Lincoln	Bruce
Athens	Cornell
Gilman	Lake Holcombe
Greenwood	McDonell Central Catholic
Owen-Withee	New Auburn
Thorp	Prairie Farm

The CWC was realigned out of existence by the WIAA and WFCA for the 2024-2025 cycle. All former members were dispersed to newly-created conferences: nine schools (Alma Center Lincoln, Cornell, Gilman, Lake Holcombe, McDonell Central Catholic, New Auburn, Owen-Withee, Prairie Farm and Thorp) went to the North Central Conference and two (Athens and Bruce) joined the eight-player division of the Northwoods Football Conference. The twelfth displaced member (Greenwood) entered into an eleven-player cooperative with Loyal in the Cloverbelt Conference.

== Conference membership history ==
School	Location	Affiliation	Mascot	Colors	Seasons	Primary Conference
Alma Center Lincoln	Alma Center, WI	Public	Hornets		2020–2023	Dairyland
Bowler/ Gresham	Bowler, WI	Public	Cats		2020–2021	Central Wisconsin
Bruce	Bruce, WI	Public	Red Raiders		2020–2023	Lakeland
Gilman	Gilman, WI	Public	Pirates		2020–2023	Cloverbelt
Greenwood	Greenwood, WI	Public	Indians		2020–2023	Cloverbelt
Marion/ Tigerton	Marion, WI	Public	Thundercatz		2020–2021	Central Wisconsin
McDonell Central Catholic	Chippewa Falls, WI	Private (Catholic)	Macks		2020–2023	Cloverbelt
New Auburn	New Auburn, WI	Public	Trojans		2020–2023	Lakeland
Newman Catholic	Wausau, WI	Private (Catholic)	Cardinals		2020–2021	Marawood
Phillips	Phillips, WI	Public	Loggers		2020–2021	Marawood
Port Edwards	Port Edwards, WI	Public	Blackhawks		2020–2021	Central Wisconsin
Tri-County	Plainfield, WI	Public	Penguins		2020–2021	Central Wisconsin
Athens	Athens, WI	Public	Bluejays		2022–2023	Marawood
Cornell	Cornell, WI	Public	Chiefs		2022–2023	Lakeland
Lake Holcombe	Lake Holcombe, WI	Public	Chieftains		2022–2023	Lakeland
Owen-Withee	Owen, WI	Public	Blackhawks		2022–2023	Cloverbelt
Prairie Farm	Prairie Farm, WI	Public	Panthers		2022–2023	Lakeland
Thorp	Thorp, WI	Public	Cardinals		2022–2023	Cloverbelt

== Membership timeline ==
CWC East CWC West

== List of state champions ==
8-Player Football
School	Year
Newman Catholic	2021
Owen-Withee	2024

== List of conference champions ==
School	Quantity	Years
Gilman	3	2020, 2021, 2023
McDonell Central Catholic	2	2022, 2023
Newman Catholic	2	2020, 2021
Owen-Withee	1	2022
Alma Center Lincoln	0	
Athens	0	
Bowler/ Gresham	0	
Bruce	0	
Cornell	0	
Greenwood	0	
Lake Holcombe	0	
Marion/ Tigerton	0	
New Auburn	0	
Phillips	0	
Port Edwards	0	
Prairie Farm	0	
Thorp	0	
Tri-County	0	
