= Cloverwood Conference =

Wisconsin high school football conference (2008–2019)

The Cloverwood Conference is a former high school football conference comprising schools in both the Cloverbelt and Marawood Conferences in west central Wisconsin. It was founded in 2008 and ran through the 2019 football season, and its members were affiliated with the Wisconsin Interscholastic Athletic Association.

== History ==
The Cloverwood Conference was formed in 2008 as a partnership between four schools in the Marawood Conference (Abbotsford, Assumption, Athens and Newman Catholic) and six in the Cloverbelt Conference (Augusta, Gilman, Greenwood, Loyal, Owen-Withee and Thorp), and was created to bring together schools of similar size in the region for football competition. Conference membership remained stable through most of its history with only a few changes to the roster. In 2010 Greenwood joined with Granton on a football cooperative that lasted six seasons. In 2011, Augusta shifted to the Dairyland Conference as a football-only member (they would join as full members three years later) with McDonell Central Catholic in Chippewa Falls taking their place. They would leave the conference along with Newman Catholic after the 2016 season, leaving the loop with eight members to end its run.

In February 2019, in conjunction with the Wisconsin Football Coaches Association, the WIAA released a sweeping football-only realignment for Wisconsin to commence with the 2020 football season and run on a two-year cycle. This meant the end for the Cloverwood Conference, as members were dispersed to the Marawood Conference (Abbotsford, Athens, Owen-Withee and Thorp) and Central Wisconsin Conference's small-school (Assumption and Loyal) and eight-player (Gilman and Greenwood) divisions.

== Conference membership history ==
School	Location	Affiliation	Mascot	Colors	Seasons	Primary Conference
Abbotsford	Abbotsford, WI	Public	Falcons		2008–2019	Marawood
Assumption	Wisconsin Rapids, WI	Private (Catholic)	Royals		2008–2019	Marawood
Athens	Athens, WI	Public	Bluejays		2008–2019	Marawood
Augusta	Augusta, WI	Public	Beavers		2008–2010	Cloverbelt
Gilman	Gilman, WI	Public	Pirates		2008–2019	Cloverbelt
Greenwood	Greenwood, WI	Public	Indians		2008–2009, 2016–2019	Cloverbelt
Loyal	Loyal, WI	Public	Greyhounds		2008–2019	Cloverbelt
Newman Catholic	Wausau, WI	Private (Catholic)	Cardinals		2008–2016	Marawood
Owen-Withee	Owen, WI	Public	Blackhawks		2008–2019	Cloverbelt
Thorp	Thorp, WI	Public	Cardinals		2008–2019	Cloverbelt
Greenwood/Granton	Greenwood, WI	Public	Indians		2010–2015	Cloverbelt
McDonell Central Catholic	Chippewa Falls, WI	Private (Catholic)	Macks		2011–2016	Cloverbelt

== List of state champions ==
Football
School	Year	Division
Gilman	2010	Division 7
Greenwood/ Granton	2011	Division 7
Owen-Withee	2014	Division 7

== List of conference champions ==
School	Quantity	Years
Abbotsford	4	2015, 2016, 2018, 2019
Athens	4	2011, 2012, 2013, 2014
Gilman	3	2008, 2009, 2010
Loyal	2	2012, 2017
Owen-Withee	2	2012, 2013
Assumption	0	
Augusta	0	
Greenwood/	0	
Greenwood/ Granton	0	
McDonell Central Catholic	0	
Newman Catholic	0	
Thorp	0	
