= Marawood Conference =

Wisconsin high school athletic conference

The Marawood Conference is a high school athletic conference with its membership concentrated in north central Wisconsin. It was founded in 1949 and all member schools are affiliated with the Wisconsin Interscholastic Athletic Association.

== History ==
=== 1949-1972 ===
Location of Original Marawood Conference Members

The Marawood Conference was founded in 1949 by seven small high schools in north central Wisconsin: Athens, Auburndale, Edgar, Marathon, Pittsville, Rudolph, and Stratford. These schools were all former members of the Marathon County League (1928-1949) and Wood County League (1925-1942), and the name of the conference reflects the location of its original member schools. Membership remained consistent through the first thirteen years of the conference's history, with the first changes coming in 1962. Rudolph High School closed and was consolidated into Wisconsin Rapids, and two schools (Granton and Spencer) joined after the dissolution of the 3-C Conference. The conference sponsored their first football league for the 1964 season, and five schools (Auburndale, Edgar, Pittsville, Spencer and Stratford) were part of the inaugural roster. Abbotsford moved over from the Cloverbelt Conference in 1966, increasing the roster to nine schools. That number jumped to eleven in 1970 when two schools who were displaced by their conferences disbanding entered: Nekoosa from the Vacationland Conference and Rib Lake from the Flambeau League.

=== 1972-2008 ===
Granton left to join the Central State Conference in 1972, bringing membership back down to ten schools. They would rejoin in 1976, replacing the departing Auburndale and Nekoosa, who both moved on to the Lumberjack Conference. Two years later, Prentice would join from the Lakeland Conference, and the conference's stable would stay intact for just over two decades until three new schools were added in 2000: Assumption in Wisconsin Rapids, Columbus Catholic in Marshfield, and Newman Catholic in Wausau. These schools were recent additions to the WIAA after the merger with WISAA, and all were previously members of the Central Wisconsin Catholic Conference. Auburndale would also reenter the Marawood Conference that year, and a fifteenth member school would join in 2005 (Northland Lutheran in Kronenwetter). The Marawood Conference would split into North and South Divisions to accommodate the recent expansion:

North Division	South Division
Abbotsford	Assumption
Athens	Auburndale
Edgar	Columbus Catholic
Marathon	Granton
Newman Catholic	Northland Lutheran
Prentice	Pittsville
Rib Lake	Spencer
	Stratford

=== 2008-present ===
In 2008, Park Falls and Phillips joined the Marawood Conference after the Lumberjack Conference ceased operations. They joined the North Division, with Edgar, Marathon and Newman Catholic moving to the South Division. These three schools replaced Columbus Catholic, Granton and Spencer, all of whom joined the Cloverbelt Conference. In 2009, Park Falls was merged with Glidden of the Indianhead Conference to form Chequamegon, who inherited Park Falls' Marawood Conference membership. Divisional alignment remained intact for the next five years before Edgar was moved back to the North Division. This lasted for three years before moving back to the South Division to replace two schools that left to join the Central Wisconsin Conference: Northland Lutheran and Pittsville. Currently, the Marawood Conference has twelve members in the following alignment:

North Division	South Division
Abbotsford	Assumption
Athens	Auburndale
Chequamegon	Edgar
Phillips	Marathon
Prentice	Newman Catholic
Rib Lake	Stratford

=== Football (2008-present) ===
In 2008, the Marawood Conference lost five football-playing members: Spencer/Columbus to the Cloverbelt Conference and four schools (Abbotsford, Assumption, Athens and Newman Catholic) to the new Cloverwood Conference, a partnership between the four Marawood and six schools affiliated with the Cloverbelt. This arrangement lasted through the 2019 season, around the same time a comprehensive realignment plan was released by the WIAA and Wisconsin Football Coaches Association to begin with the 2020 season and run on a two-year realignment cycle. Five full Marawood members (Abbotsford, Athens, Auburndale, Edgar and Marathon) were joined by three Cloverbelt schools (Colby, Owen-Withee and Thorp) to form the 2020-2021 roster. Before the 2021 season could begin, three schools (Athens, Owen-Withee and Thorp) decided to transition to eight-player football and left the conference, with their games counting as losses by forfeit in the standings. For the 2022-2023 competition cycle, Pittsville joined the remaining five schools from the 2021 season and the Marawood formed a scheduling alliance with the Central Wisconsin Conference's small-school division. In 2024, the Marawood Conference lost two members (Colby and Marathon) to the Central Wisconsin Conference's large-school division, replacing them with three schools from the CWC's small-school division (Iola-Scandinavia, Pacelli and Rosholt) and full members Assumption. This alignment is set to remain in place until the 2026-2027 realignment cycle, when Assumption and Rosholt switch to eight-player football, and the Loyal/Greenwood football cooperative set to join as their replacements.

== List of member schools ==
=== Current full members ===
School	Location	Affiliation	Enrollment	Mascot	Colors	Joined	Division
Abbotsford	Abbotsford, WI	Public	214	Falcons		1966	North
Assumption	Wisconsin Rapids, WI	Private (Catholic)	135	Royals		2000	South
Athens	Athens, WI	Public	134	Bluejays		1949	North
Auburndale	Auburndale, WI	Public	237	Eagles		1949, 2000	South
Chequamegon	Park Falls, WI	Public	182	Screaming Eagles		2009	North
Edgar	Edgar, WI	Public	189	Wildcats		1949	South
Marathon	Marathon City, WI	Public	279	Red Raiders		1949	South
Newman Catholic	Wausau, WI	Private (Catholic)	93	Cardinals		2000	South
Phillips	Phillips, WI	Public	189	Loggers		2008	North
Prentice	Prentice, WI	Public	109	Buccaneers		1978	North
Rib Lake	Rib Lake, WI	Public	154	Redmen		1970	North
Stratford	Stratford, WI	Public	277	Tigers		1949	South

=== Current associate members ===
School	Location	Affiliation	Mascot	Colors	Primary Conference	Sport(s)
Iola-Scandinavia	Iola, WI	Public	Thunderbirds		Central Wisconsin	Football
Loyal/ Greenwood	Loyal, WI	Public	Wolves		Cloverbelt	Football
Pacelli	Stevens Point, WI	Private (Catholic)	Cardinals		Central Wisconsin	Football

=== Former members ===
School	Location	Affiliation	Mascot	Colors	Joined	Left	Conference Joined	Current Conference
Columbus Catholic	Marshfield, WI	Private (Catholic)	Dons		2000	2008	Cloverbelt	
Granton	Granton, WI	Public	Bulldogs		1962, 1976	1972, 2008	Central State, Cloverbelt	Cloverbelt
Nekoosa	Nekoosa, WI	Public	Papermakers		1970	1976	Lumberjack	South Central
Northland Lutheran	Kronenwetter, WI	Private (Lutheran, WELS)	Wildcats		2005	2017	Central Wisconsin	
Park Falls	Park Falls, WI	Public	Cardinals		2008	2009	Closed (merged into Chequamegon)	
Pittsville	Pittsville, WI	Public	Panthers		1949	2017	Central Wisconsin	
Rudolph	Rudolph, WI	Public	Reindeer		1949	1962	Closed (consolidated into Wisconsin Rapids)	
Spencer	Spencer, WI	Public	Rockets		1962	2008	Cloverbelt	

=== Former football-only members ===
School	Location	Affiliation	Mascot	Colors	Seasons	Primary Conference
Butternut	Butternut, WI	Public	Midgets		2008	Indianhead
Colby	Colby, WI	Public	Hornets		2020-2023	Cloverbelt
McDonell Central Catholic	Chippewa Falls, WI	Private (Catholic)	Macks		2008-2010	Cloverbelt
Owen-Withee	Owen, WI	Public	Blackhawks		2020	Cloverbelt
Rib Lake/ Prentice	Rib Lake, WI	Public	Hawks		1988, 1991-2019	Marawood
Rosholt	Rosholt, WI	Public	Hornets		2024-2025	Central Wisconsin
Spencer/ Columbus Catholic	Spencer, WI	Public/Private (Catholic)	Rockets		2002-2007	Marawood
Thorp	Thorp, WI	Public	Cardinals		2020	Cloverbelt
Tomahawk	Tomahawk, WI	Public	Hatchets		2011-2019	Great Northern

== Membership timeline ==
=== Full members ===
North Division South Division

== Membership map ==
Marawood Conference
Location of Marawood Conference full members:
1 Abbotsford
2 Assumption
3 Athens
4 Auburndale
5 Chequamegon
6 Edgar
7 Marathon
8 Newman Catholic
9 Phillips
10 Prentice
11 Rib Lake
12 Stratford

== Sanctioned sports ==
	Baseball	Boys Basketball	Girls Basketball	Boys Cross Country	Girls Cross Country	Football	Boys Golf	Softball	Boys Track & Field	Girls Track & Field	Girls Volleyball	Boys Wrestling	Girls Wrestling
Abbotsford	● (Note: Co-operative with Colby)	●	●	●	●	●			●	●	●	●	●
Assumption	●	●	●	●	●		●	●	●	●	●	● (Note: Co-operative with Pacelli)	●
Athens	●	●	●	●	●			●	●	●	●	●	●
Auburndale	●	●	●	●	●	●		●	●	●	●	●	●
Chequamegon	●	●	●	●	●			●	●	●	●	●	●
Edgar	●	●	●	●	●	●		●	●	●	●	●	●
Marathon	●	●	●	●	●		●	●	●	●	●	●	●
Newman Catholic	●	●	●					●	●	●	●		
Phillips	●	●	●	●	●		●	●	●	●	●	●	●
Prentice	●	●	●	● (Note: Co-operative with Rib Lake)	●		●	●	●	●	●		
Rib Lake	●	●	●					●	●	●	●		
Stratford	●	●	●	●	●			●	●	●	●	●	●

== List of state champions ==
=== Fall sports ===
Boys Cross Country
School	Year	Division
Rib Lake	1999	Division 3

Girls Cross Country
School	Year	Division
Edgar	1983	Class C
Prentice	1985	Class C
Prentice	1986	Class C
Prentice	1987	Class C
Edgar	1988	Class C
Edgar	2008	Division 3
Edgar	2009	Division 3

Football
School	Year	Division
Edgar	1979	Division 4
Stratford	1986	Division 5
Edgar	1992	Division 5
Edgar	1999	Division 5
Edgar	2001	Division 5
Stratford	2003	Division 6
Stratford	2004	Division 6
Stratford	2005	Division 6
Stratford	2006	Division 6
Stratford	2007	Division 6
Stratford	2008	Division 6
Edgar	2009	Division 6
Edgar	2010	Division 6
Edgar	2016	Division 7
Edgar	2023	Division 7

Girls Volleyball
School	Year	Division
Abbotsford	1981	Class C
Abbotsford	1982	Class C
Abbotsford	1983	Class C
Abbotsford	1997	Division 4
Abbotsford	1998	Division 4
Abbotsford	1999	Division 4
Abbotsford	2001	Division 4
Newman Catholic	2013	Division 4
Newman Catholic	2014	Division 4
Newman Catholic	2015	Division 4
Newman Catholic	2016	Division 4

=== Winter sports ===
Boys Basketball
School	Year	Division
Marathon	1975	Class C
Marathon	1976	Class C
Marathon	1977	Class C
Edgar	1997	Division 4
Marathon	2011	Division 4
Newman Catholic	2023	Division 5

Girls Basketball
School	Year	Division
Prentice	1981	Class C
Prentice	1989	Class C
Prentice	1992	Division 4
Marathon	1998	Division 3
Newman Catholic	2002	Division 3
Newman Catholic	2010	Division 4
Newman Catholic	2011	Division 5
Assumption	2015	Division 5
Assumption	2016	Division 5
Assumption	2021	Division 5

Boys Wrestling
School	Year	Division
Athens	1984	Class C
Athens	1987	Class C
Athens	1991	Division 3
Athens	1993	Division 3
Athens	1994	Division 3
Athens	1995	Division 3
Stratford	2017	Division 3
Stratford	2018	Division 3

=== Spring sports ===
Baseball
School	Year	Division
Auburndale	1960	Single Division
Athens	1982	Class C
Marathon	1992	Division 3
Spencer	1994	Division 4
Abbotsford	2006	Division 4
Marathon	2008	Division 3
Marathon	2010	Division 3
Athens	2017	Division 4
Athens	2018	Division 4
Stratford	2019	Division 3

Girls Soccer
School	Year	Division
Assumption	2014	Division 4

Softball
School	Year	Division
Assumption	2001	Division 3
Assumption	2005	Division 4
Assumption	2022	Division 5

Boys Track & Field
School	Year	Division
Marathon	1990	Class C
Athens	2005	Division 3
Newman Catholic	2006	Division 3
Newman Catholic	2007	Division 3
Stratford	2008	Division 3
Edgar	2012	Division 3
Marathon	2015	Division 3
Marathon	2016	Division 3
Marathon	2026	Division 3

Girls Track & Field
School	Year	Division
Marathon	1981	Class C
Marathon	1982	Class C
Marathon	1983	Class C
Marathon	1985	Class C
Marathon	1986	Class C
Newman Catholic	2009	Division 3
Edgar	2010	Division 3
Edgar	2011	Division 3
Edgar	2012	Division 3
Edgar	2013	Division 3

=== Summer sports ===
Baseball
School	Year	Division
Auburndale	1970	Single Division

== List of conference champions ==
=== Boys Basketball ===
School	Quantity	Years
Marathon	31	1951, 1952, 1966, 1968, 1969, 1974, 1975, 1976, 1981, 1982, 1983, 1984, 1985, 1986, 1991, 1992, 1995, 1998, 2001, 2002, 2003, 2008, 2010, 2011, 2015, 2016, 2017, 2022, 2023, 2024, 2026
Stratford	16	1952, 1953, 1954, 1955, 1956, 1967, 1968, 1969, 1994, 1996, 1997, 2005, 2006, 2019, 2020, 2025
Edgar	13	1958, 1959, 1960, 1972, 1977, 1979, 1980, 1981, 1984, 1988, 2016, 2017, 2021
Auburndale	11	1957, 1962, 1963, 1971, 2003, 2004, 2011, 2012, 2013, 2014, 2018
Pittsville	10	1961, 1965, 1966, 1990, 1993, 1994, 2000, 2001, 2002, 2007
Prentice	10	1989, 1990, 1999, 2005, 2009, 2010, 2011, 2012, 2013, 2026
Abbotsford	8	1969, 1970, 1978, 2002, 2004, 2006, 2007, 2014
Rib Lake	7	1987, 2001, 2009, 2018, 2020, 2024, 2025
Assumption	4	2007, 2008, 2009, 2017
Athens	4	1950, 2021, 2022, 2023
Spencer	3	1963, 1964, 2007
Phillips	2	2015, 2019
Columbus Catholic	1	2008
Nekoosa	1	1973
Rudolph	1	1950
Chequamegon	0	
Granton	0	
Newman Catholic	0	
Northland Lutheran	0	
Park Falls	0	

=== Girls Basketball ===
School	Quantity	Years
Prentice	22	1980, 1981, 1982, 1984, 1985, 1986, 1987, 1988, 1989, 1990, 1991, 1992, 1993, 1994, 1995, 1996, 2009, 2010, 2011, 2012, 2017, 2019
Assumption	11	2002, 2008, 2009, 2013, 2014, 2016, 2021, 2022, 2023, 2024, 2025
Newman Catholic	11	2002, 2003, 2004, 2005, 2006, 2008, 2010, 2011, 2012, 2019, 2020
Marathon	10	1992, 1997, 1998, 1999, 2001, 2015, 2016, 2017, 2018, 2026
Rib Lake	10	1974, 1976, 1977, 1978, 2001, 2003, 2005, 2007, 2018, 2026
Abbotsford	7	1975, 1978, 1979, 1983, 1984, 1985, 2013
Phillips	6	2020, 2021, 2022, 2023, 2024, 2025
Athens	5	1985, 1990, 2014, 2015, 2023
Pittsville	5	2003, 2004, 2005, 2006, 2007
Stratford	3	2000, 2001, 2021
Auburndale	2	2016, 2021
Edgar	2	2008, 2016
Spencer	1	1995
Chequamegon	0	
Columbus Catholic	0	
Granton	0	
Nekoosa	0	
Northland Lutheran	0	
Park Falls	0	

=== Football ===
School	Quantity	Years
Edgar	32	1966, 1976, 1977, 1979, 1984, 1985, 1987, 1988, 1989, 1990, 1991, 1992, 1996, 1997, 1998, 1999, 2000, 2008, 2009, 2010, 2011, 2012, 2013, 2014, 2017, 2018, 2020, 2022, 2023, 2024, 2025, 2026
Stratford	22	1965, 1967, 1971, 1976, 1978, 1983, 1986, 1990, 1993, 1994, 1995, 1997, 2001, 2002, 2003, 2004, 2005, 2006, 2007, 2013, 2016, 2019
Auburndale	9	1965, 1968, 1969, 1970, 1972, 1974, 1975, 2002, 2022
Marathon	8	1973, 1976, 1977, 1981, 1983, 1993, 2013, 2015
Spencer	5	1964, 1965, 1966, 1980, 1982
Colby	3	2020, 2021, 2022
Pittsville	2	1978, 1990
Nekoosa	1	1971
Abbotsford	0	
Assumption	0	
Athens	0	
Butternut	0	
Chequamegon	0	
Columbus Catholic	0	
Iola-Scandinavia	0	
Loyal/ Greenwood	0	
McDonell Central Catholic	0	
Newman Catholic	0	
Owen-Withee	0	
Pacelli	0	
Phillips	0	
Prentice	0	
Rib Lake	0	
Rib Lake/ Prentice	0	
Rosholt	0	
Spencer/ Columbus Catholic	0	
Thorp	0	
Tomahawk	0	
