= Central Wisconsin Conference =

Wisconsin high school athletic conference

The Central Wisconsin Conference is a high school athletic conference comprising twenty-one high schools in three divisions in central Wisconsin. Founded in 1926, the conference and its member schools are affiliated with the Wisconsin Interscholastic Athletic Association.

== History ==
=== 1926-1950 ===
Location of Original Central Wisconsin Conference Members

The Central Wisconsin Conference was formed in 1926 by six small high schools in two counties (Portage and Waupaca) in central Wisconsin: Amherst, Iola, Little Wolf (later renamed Manawa), Marion, Waupaca and Weyauwega. Tigerton and Wittenberg joined the conference in 1927 to create an eight-member circuit. The conference expanded to ten with the entrance of Birnamwood and Rosholt in 1929, and the conference split into Northern and Southern sections:

Northern Section	Southern Section
Birnamwood	Amherst
Marion	Iola
Rosholt	Little Wolf
Tigerton	Waupaca
Wittenberg	Weyauwega

This alignment lasted for three years before going back to the original six member schools in 1932, when Birnamwood, Rosholt, Tigerton and Wittenberg joined with Mattoon High School to form the Wolf River Valley Conference. Football was first sponsored as an interscholastic sport by the Central Wisconsin Conference in 1945, and four schools (Manawa, Marion, Waupaca and Weyauwega) participated in the first season. Wittenberg joined as a football-only member from the Wolf River Valley Conference in 1947 and continued until they gained full membership three years later.

=== 1950-1970 ===
In 1950, the Central Wisconsin Conference experienced its first changes to membership in nearly two decades, with the entrance of Mosinee and the return of Wittenberg from the Wolf River Valley Conference. Mosinee left the Marathon County League in 1949, shortly before the creation of the Marawood Conference with former members of the Wood County League. Their stay in the CWC would be brief, lasting only a single season. Mosinee's spot in the CWC would be taken in 1951 by Bonduel, who joined after the Mid-Valley Conference disbanded the year prior. The conference would continue with eight members until the early 1960s. Iola High School merged with Scandinavia High School in 1960, and the new Iola-Scandinavia High School took Iola's place in the conference. A ninth school would be added in 1962, as Wautoma joined after the 7-C Conference dissolved. Bonduel left to join the Northeastern Wisconsin Conference in 1964, and Wautoma did the same two years later to become a charter member of the short-lived Vacationland Conference. The recently opened high school in Little Chute joined the CWC in 1969, bringing the loop back up to eight members, but significant changes would be coming in the 1970s.

=== 1970-1984 ===
Major changes came to Central Wisconsin Conference membership in 1970. Four schools left the conference that year: Waupaca and Weyauwega became charter members of the East Central Conference, and Amherst and Iola-Scandinavia joined the Central State Conference. Wittenberg and Birnamwood also consolidated into Wittenberg-Birnamwood High School while retaining Wittenberg's CWC affiliation. Bonduel and Wautoma rejoined the CWC; Bonduel from the NEW Conference and Wautoma from the shuttered Vacationland Conference. A third new member (Shiocton) made their CWC debut, joining from the recently dissolved Little Nine Conference. The seven-member group would remain for three seasons before Weyauwega rejoined the CWC in 1973 after leaving the East Central Conference. They traded affiliations with Little Chute, who experienced a bump in enrollment after the closing of St. John High School and outgrew the CWC. Little Chute entered the Eastern Wisconsin Conference in 1974. Shiocton would leave to join the Central State Conference in 1977, and Wautoma would follow them out two years later for membership in the East Central Conference. Oconto and Oconto Falls moved over from the Bay Conference in 1979 to put the league at seven members, which it would remain at for the next five years.

=== 1984-2008 ===
In 1984, Oconto and Oconto Falls both left the Central Wisconsin Conference to join the Packerland Conference, leaving the CWC at five schools. That same year, the twelve-member Central State Conference, another conference of small schools with a similar geographic footprint, was absorbed by the CWC. To accommodate the expansion and facilitate scheduling, the conference divided into Large and Small School divisions that year:

Large Schools	Small Schools
Amherst	Almond-Bancroft
Bonduel	Bowler
Manawa	Gresham
Marion	Iola-Scandinavia
Rosholt	Menominee Indian
Shiocton	Port Edwards
Weyauwega-Fremont	Tigerton
Wittenberg-Birnamwood	Tri-County
	Wild Rose

Menominee Indian and Rosholt swapped divisions in 1986, and the alignment remained stable for fourteen years. In 2000, Pacelli High School in Stevens Point joined the conference's Large Schools division after the breakup of the Central Wisconsin Catholic Conference and the merger of the WIAA and WISAA became final, bringing membership to eighteen schools. Two years later, Marion and Shiocton switched divisions with Rosholt (making their return to the Large Schools division) and Tri-County before further changes came a few years later.

=== 2008-present ===
In 2008, the Central Wisconsin Conference moved Rosholt to the Small Schools division of the conference, and renamed their divisions the Central Wisconsin 8 (formerly the Large Schools division) and the Central Wisconsin 10 (Small Schools):

Central Wisconsin Eight	Central Wisconsin Ten
Amherst	Almond-Bancroft
Bonduel	Bowler
Iola-Scandinavia	Gresham
Manawa	Marion
Pacelli	Menominee Indian
Shiocton	Port Edwards
Weyauwega-Fremont	Rosholt
Wittenberg-Birnamwood	Tigerton
	Tri-County
	Wild Rose

This arrangement lasted for nearly a decade before the next major realignment. In 2017, the CWC added three schools: Northland Lutheran in Kronenwetter, Pittsville and Wisconsin Valley Lutheran in Mosinee. Northland Lutheran and Pittsville joined from the Marawood Conference while Wisconsin Valley Lutheran previously competed as an independent. The CWC also dropped the numerical designator from their divisions and split into three seven-member divisions to accommodate the expansion:

East Division	North Division	South Division
Amherst	Bowler	Almond-Bancroft
Bonduel	Gresham	Pacelli
Iola-Scandinavia	Manawa	Pittsville
Menominee Indian	Marion	Port Edwards
Shiocton	Northland Lutheran	Rosholt
Weyauwega-Fremont	Tigerton	Tri-County
Wittenberg-Birnamwood	Wisconsin Valley Lutheran	Wild Rose

White Lake joined the CWC North Division in 2021, moving over from the Northern Lakes Conference. The next year, Manawa shifted to the Eastern Division, rejoining old rivals in the Central Wisconsin Eight. The conference lost a member in 2023 when Wisconsin Valley Lutheran closed its doors, bringing the North Division down to six schools and the Central Wisconsin Conference to its current alignment.

== List of member schools ==
=== Current full members ===
School	Location	Affiliation	Enrollment	Mascot	Colors	Joined	Division
Almond-Bancroft	Almond, WI	Public	98	Eagles		1984	South
Amherst (Note: Left the Central Wisconsin Conference in 1970, returned in 1984)	Amherst, WI	Public	320	Falcons		1926, 1984	East
Bonduel (Note: Left the Central Wisconsin Conference in 1964, returned in 1970)	Bonduel, WI	Public	269	Bears		1951, 1970	East
Bowler	Bowler, WI	Public	87	Panthers		1984	North
Gresham	Gresham, WI	Public	86	Wildcats		1984	North
Iola-Scandinavia	Iola, WI	Public	191	Thunderbirds		1960, 1984	East
Manawa	Manawa, WI	Public	190	Wolves		1926	East
Marion	Marion, WI	Public	147	Mustangs		1926	North
Menominee Nation	Kesīqnæh, WI	Federal (Tribal)	372	Eagles		1984	East
Northland Lutheran	Kronenwetter, WI	Private (Lutheran, WELS)	115	Wildcats		2017	North
Pacelli	Stevens Point, WI	Private (Catholic)	173	Cardinals		2000	South
Pittsville	Pittsville, WI	Public	164	Panthers		2017	South
Port Edwards	Port Edwards, WI	Public	139	Blackhawks		1984	South
Rosholt (Note: Left the Central Wisconsin Conference in 1932, returned in 1984)	Rosholt, WI	Public	144	Hornets		1929, 1984	South
Shiocton (Note: Left the Central Wisconsin Conference in 1977, returned in 1984)	Shiocton, WI	Public	208	Chiefs		1970, 1984	East
Tigerton	Tigerton, WI	Public	62	Tigers		1927, 1984	North
Tri-County	Plainfield, WI	Public	159	Penguins		1984	South
Weyauwega-Fremont (Note: Left the Central Wisconsin Conference in 1970, returned in 1973)	Weyauwega, WI	Public	257	Warhawks		1926, 1973	East
White Lake	White Lake, WI	Public	40	Lakers		2021	North
Wild Rose	Wild Rose, WI	Public	155	Wildcats		1984	South
Wittenberg-Birnamwood	Wittenberg, WI	Public	336	Chargers		1970	East

=== Current associate members ===
School	Location	Affiliation	Mascot	Colors	Primary Conference	Sport(s)
Colby	Colby, WI	Public	Hornets		Cloverbelt	Football
Columbus Catholic	Marshfield, WI	Private (Catholic)	Dons		Cloverbelt	Boys Soccer
Marathon	Marathon, WI	Public	Red Raiders		Marawood	Football
Newman Catholic	Wausau, WI	Private (Catholic)	Cardinals		Marawood	Football (8-player), Boys Soccer
Spencer/ Columbus Catholic	Spencer, WI	Public/Private (Catholic)	Rockets		Marawood/Cloverbelt	Football
Stratford	Stratford, WI	Public	Tigers		Marawood	Football

=== Former members ===
School	Location	Affiliation	Mascot	Colors	Joined	Left	Conference Joined	Current Conference
Birnamwood	Birnamwood, WI	Public	Orioles		1929	1932	Wolf River Valley	Closed (consolidated into Wittenberg-Birnamwood)
Iola	Iola, WI	Public	Hilltoppers		1926	1960	Closed (consolidated into Iola-Scandinavia)	
Little Chute	Little Chute, WI	Public	Mustangs		1969	1974	East Central	North Eastern
Mosinee	Mosinee, WI	Public	Indians		1950	1951	Independent	Great Northern
Oconto	Oconto, WI	Public	Blue Devils		1979	1984	Packerland	
Oconto Falls	Oconto Falls, WI	Public	Panthers		1979	1984	Packerland	North Eastern
Waupaca	Waupaca, WI	Public	Comets		1926	1970	East Central	North Eastern
Wautoma	Wautoma, WI	Public	Hornets		1962, 1970	1966, 1979	Vacationland, East Central	South Central
Wisconsin Valley Lutheran	Mosinee, WI	Private (Lutheran, LCMS)	Wolves		2017	2023	Closed in 2023	
Wittenberg	Wittenberg, WI	Public	Wildcats		1927, 1950	1932, 1970	Wolf River Valley	Closed (consolidated into Wittenberg-Birnamwood)

=== Former football-only members ===
==== 11-Player ====
School	Location	Affiliation	Mascot	Colors	Seasons	Primary Conference
Assumption	Wisconsin Rapids, WI	Private (Catholic)	Royals		2020-2023	Marawood
Loyal	Loyal, WI	Public	Greyhounds		2020-2023	Cloverbelt
Loyal/ Greenwood	Loyal, WI	Public	Greyhounds		2024-2025	Cloverbelt
Nekoosa	Nekoosa, WI	Public	Papermakers		2020-2023	South Central
Wittenberg	Wittenberg, WI	Public	Wildcats		1947-1949	Wolf River Valley

== Membership timeline ==
=== Full members ===
Northern Section Southern Section Large Schools Small Schools Central Wisconsin 8 Central Wisconsin 10 East Division North Division South Division

=== Football members ===
==== 11-Player ====
Large Schools Small Schools Central Wisconsin 8 Central Wisconsin 10

== Membership map ==
Central Wisconsin Conference
Location of Central Wisconsin Conference full members:
1 Almond-Bancroft
2 Amherst
3 Bonduel
4 Bowler
5 Gresham
6 Iola-Scandinavia
7 Manawa
8 Marion
9 Menominee Indian
10 Northland Lutheran
11 Pacelli
12 Pittsville
13 Port Edwards
14 Rosholt
15 Shiocton
16 Tigerton
17 Tri-County
18 Weyauwega-Fremont
19 White Lake
20 Wild Rose
21 Wittenberg-Birnamwood

== Sanctioned sports ==
	Baseball	Boys Basketball	Girls Basketball	Boys Cross Country	Girls Cross Country	Football	Football (8-player)	Boys Golf	Boys Soccer	Softball	Boys Track & Field	Girls Track & Field	Girls Volleyball	Boys Wrestling	Girls Wrestling
Almond-Bancroft	●	●	●				●			●	●	●	●	●	●
Amherst	●	●	●	●	●	●		●	●	●	●	●	●	●	●
Bonduel	●	●	●	●	●			●		●	●	●	●	●	●
Bowler	●	●	●				● (Note: Co-operative with Gresham)			●			●		
Gresham	●	●	●	● (Note: Co-operative with Bowler)	●				●		●	●	●		
Iola-Scandinavia	●	●	●	●	●			●		●	●	●	●		
Manawa	●	●	●	●	●			●		●	●	●	●	●	●
Marion	●	●	● (Note: Co-operative with Tigerton)	●	●		●	●		●	●	●	●		
Menominee Nation	●	●	●	●	●		●	●		●	●	●	●	●	●
Northland Lutheran	●	●	●	●	●			●	●	●	●	●	●		
Pacelli	●	●	●	●	●			●	● (Note: Co-operative with Iola-Scandinavia)	●	●	●	●		
Pittsville	●	●	●	●	●					●	●	●	●	●	●
Port Edwards	●	●	●	●	●		●	●		●	●	●	●		
Rosholt	●	●	●	●	●		●			●	●	●	●	●	●
Shiocton	●	●	●	●	●			●		●	●	●	●	●	●
Tigerton	●	●								●			●		
Tri-County	●	●	●	●	●		●		●	●	●	●	●	●	●
Weyauwega-Fremont	●	●	●	●	●	●		●		●	●	●	●	●	●
White Lake	●	●	●							●			●		
Wild Rose	●	●	●				●			●	●	●	●		
Wittenberg-Birnamwood	●	●	●	●	●	●		●		●	●	●	●	●	●

== List of state champions ==
=== Fall sports ===
Boys Cross Country
School	Year	Division
Amherst	1959	Small Schools
Waupaca	1962	Small Schools

Girls Cross Country
School	Year	Division
Iola-Scandinavia	2000	Division 3

Football
School	Year	Division
Manawa	1985	Division 5
Wittenberg-Birnamwood	1997	Division 4
Pacelli	2005	Division 7
Amherst	2012	Division 5
Shiocton	2013	Division 6
Amherst	2015	Division 5
Amherst	2016	Division 5
Amherst	2017	Division 5
Iola-Scandinavia	2018	Division 5
Stratford	2022	Division 6
Stratford	2023	Division 6
Stratford	2024	Division 5

8-Player Football
School	Year
Newman Catholic	2022
Newman Catholic	2023

Girls Volleyball
School	Year	Division
Iola-Scandinavia	1989	Class C
Iola-Scandinavia	1997	Division 3
Weyauwega-Fremont	2005	Division 3

=== Winter sports ===
Boys Basketball
School	Year	Division
Marion	1938	Class C

Girls Basketball
School	Year	Division
Amherst	1999	Division 3
Amherst	2009	Division 3
Pacelli	2026	Division 5

Curling
School	Year	Division
Waupaca	1961	Single Division
Waupaca	1965	Single Division
Waupaca	1969	Single Division

Boys Wrestling
School	Year	Division
Bonduel	1998	Division 3
Iola-Scandinavia	2004	Division 3

=== Spring sports ===
Baseball
School	Year	Division
Manawa	1983	Class C
Pacelli	2003	Division 3
Marion	2009	Division 4

Boys Golf
School	Year	Division
Amherst	2001	Division 3
Pacelli	2007	Division 3

Softball
School	Year	Division
Marion	1985	Class C
Marion	1986	Class C
Marion	1988	Class C
Marion	1990	Class C
Marion	1991	Division 3
Marion	1992	Division 3
Amherst	1999	Division 3
Pacelli	2003	Division 4
Tigerton	2010	Division 4
Pacelli	2012	Division 3
Pacelli	2015	Division 4
Pacelli	2023	Division 5
Pacelli	2024	Division 5
Almond-Bancroft	2026	Division 5

Boys Track & Field
School	Year	Division
Weyauwega	1940	Class C
Amherst	2003	Division 3
Rosholt	2011	Division 3
Wild Rose	2016	Division 3
Shiocton	2023	Division 3

Girls Track & Field
School	Year	Division
Shiocton	1988	Class C
Rosholt	1989	Class C
Rosholt	1990	Class C
Rosholt	2001	Division 3
Rosholt	2002	Division 3
Rosholt	2005	Division 3
Rosholt	2006	Division 3
Wittenberg-Birnamwood	2017	Division 2
Wittenberg-Birnamwood	2018	Division 2

== List of conference champions ==
=== Boys Basketball ===
School	Quantity	Years
Weyauwega-Fremont	19	1928, 1933, 1934, 1935, 1939, 1944, 1945, 1962, 1980, 1981, 1999, 2001, 2002, 2003, 2004, 2005, 2006, 2007, 2008
Amherst	15	1930, 1953, 1956, 1957, 1985, 1987, 1997, 1998, 2000, 2010, 2011, 2013, 2015, 2016, 2018
Marion	15	1927, 1929, 1930, 1931, 1936, 1937, 1938, 1940, 1941, 1942, 1946, 1955, 1956, 1968, 2023
Wittenberg-Birnamwood	15	1973, 1974, 1975, 1976, 1977, 1978, 1982, 1983, 1984, 1986, 1989, 1990, 1991, 1995, 1997
Manawa	14	1931, 1932, 1939, 1951, 1955, 1956, 1961, 1966, 1984, 1985, 2019, 2020, 2021, 2022
Almond-Bancroft	13	1989, 1994, 1998, 2003, 2004, 2005, 2012, 2017, 2019, 2021, 2022, 2024, 2025
Iola-Scandinavia	13	1985, 1986, 1987, 1991, 1992, 1993, 2004, 2006, 2007, 2008, 2019, 2020, 2022
Bonduel	11	1960, 1971, 1993, 1994, 1996, 1997, 2012, 2021, 2024, 2025, 2026
Waupaca	11	1943, 1945, 1947, 1948, 1950, 1952, 1953, 1959, 1964, 1967, 1969
Shiocton	9	1991, 1992, 2002, 2004, 2013, 2017, 2019, 2020, 2023
Port Edwards	7	1995, 1996, 1997, 1999, 2014, 2015, 2016
Pacelli	5	2003, 2014, 2018, 2023, 2026
Rosholt	5	1988, 1999, 2000, 2002, 2009
Wild Rose	5	2001, 2010, 2011, 2013, 2020
Tigerton	4	1932, 2024, 2025, 2026
Gresham	3	2002, 2017, 2018
Wittenberg	3	1954, 1958, 1965
Little Chute	2	1970, 1972
Wautoma	2	1963, 1979
Menominee Nation	1	1988
Northland Lutheran	1	2023
Oconto	1	1982
Oconto Falls	1	1984
Tri-County	1	2009
Wisconsin Valley Lutheran	1	2020
Birnamwood	0	
Bowler	0	
Iola	0	
Mosinee	0	
Pittsville	0	
White Lake	0	

=== Girls Basketball ===
School	Quantity	Years
Amherst	18	1985, 1986, 1988, 1992, 1995, 1998, 1999, 2000, 2001, 2007, 2008, 2011, 2012, 2013, 2016, 2018, 2019, 2022
Wittenberg-Birnamwood	16	1978, 1982, 1994, 2002, 2003, 2004, 2005, 2010, 2012, 2013, 2014, 2016, 2017, 2020, 2025, 2026
Iola-Scandinavia	13	1986, 1991, 1992, 1993, 1994, 1998, 2000, 2001, 2003, 2004, 2005, 2006, 2008
Bonduel	10	1985, 1995, 1996, 1997, 2014, 2015, 2021, 2022, 2023, 2024
Manawa	8	1983, 1984, 1987, 1993, 2007, 2019, 2021, 2022
Almond-Bancroft	7	1986, 1987, 1988, 1990, 1999, 2011, 2023
Wild Rose	7	1989, 2007, 2012, 2013, 2020, 2022, 2023
Marion	7	1985, 1989, 1992, 2005, 2010, 2014, 2026
Weyauwega-Fremont	6	1979, 1990, 1991, 2005, 2009, 2013
Gresham	5	2021, 2022, 2023, 2024, 2025
Pacelli	5	2006, 2019, 2024, 2025, 2026
Rosholt	5	1990, 2001, 2002, 2009, 2021
Tri-County	5	2003, 2009, 2016, 2017, 2018
Tigerton	4	1985, 1995, 1996, 1997
Oconto	3	1980, 1981, 1982
Northland Lutheran	2	2021, 2026
Wautoma	2	1976, 1977
Bowler	1	2018
Menominee Nation	1	2015
Oconto Falls	1	1983
Shiocton	1	2005
Wisconsin Valley Lutheran	1	2020
Pittsville	0	
Port Edwards	0	
White Lake	0	

=== Football ===
==== 11-player ====
School	Quantity	Years
Manawa	18	1945, 1950, 1953, 1969, 1972, 1974, 1975, 1976, 1978, 1980, 1982, 1983, 1984, 1985, 1986, 1987, 1988, 1989
Waupaca	14	1946, 1947, 1948, 1949, 1951, 1955, 1956, 1957, 1958, 1960, 1963, 1964, 1967, 1968
Wittenberg-Birnamwood	14	1976, 1990, 1991, 1992, 1994, 1996, 1997, 1999, 2000, 2001, 2002, 2003, 2004, 2022
Iola-Scandinavia	12	1984, 1995, 1996, 1998, 1999, 2003, 2004, 2005, 2007, 2018, 2020, 2023
Amherst	11	1986, 2011, 2012, 2014, 2015, 2016, 2017, 2019, 2020, 2021, 2026
Wild Rose	11	1985, 1988, 1993, 1994, 2000, 2005, 2006, 2008, 2009, 2012, 2016
Rosholt	9	1987, 1988, 1989, 1991, 1992, 2001, 2012, 2013, 2014
Bonduel	7	1952, 1958, 1970, 1990, 1993, 1995, 1998
Pacelli	6	2001, 2006, 2007, 2008, 2010, 2021
Weyauwega-Fremont	6	1961, 1962, 1965, 1966, 1977, 2005
Almond-Bancroft	4	2002, 2015, 2018, 2019
Shiocton	4	2005, 2009, 2011, 2013
Stratford	4	2022, 2023, 2024, 2025
Marion	3	1954, 1965, 1991
Marion/ Tigerton	3	2009, 2010,2011
Oconto Falls	3	1979, 1981, 1982
Port Edwards	3	1997, 2004, 2009
Little Chute	2	1971, 1973
Wittenberg	2	1959, 1967
Assumption	1	2022
Tigerton	1	1990
Bowler	0	
Bowler/ Gresham	0	
Colby	0	
Loyal	0	
Menominee Nation	0	
Loyal/ Greenwood	0	
Marathon	0	
Nekoosa	0	
Oconto	0	
Pittsville	0	
Spencer/ Columbus Catholic	0	
Tri-County	0	
Wautoma	0	

==== 8-player ====
School	Quantity	Years
Almond-Bancroft	2	2023, 2024
Marion/ Tigerton	2	2019, 2025
Newman Catholic	2	2022, 2024
Port Edwards	1	2019
Rosholt	1	2026
Bowler/ Gresham	0	
Menominee Nation	0	
Tri-County	0	
Wild Rose	0	
