= Tri-County Football Conference =

Wisconsin high school football conference (1934-1944)

The Tri-County Football Conference is a former high school football conference with its membership concentrated in eastern Wisconsin. Formed in 1934 and competing through the 1944 football season, its member schools were affiliated with the Wisconsin Interscholastic Athletic Association.

== History ==
The Tri-County Football Conference was founded in 1934 by four small high schools in the Fox Valley region of eastern Wisconsin: Kimberly, Manawa, Marion and Omro. All four members belonged to conferences that did not sponsor football, and it was named after the three counties where original member schools were located: Outagamie, Waupaca and Winnebago. For the 1937 season, Omro left the Tri-County and were replaced by Bear Creek and Pulaski. Omro returned in 1938 when Bear Creek exited the conference to compete in six-man football. The conference expanded to six members in 1940 with the addition of Waupaca, but lost Omro after the 1941 season. Bonduel joined the conference as a replacement for the 1942 season, which would turn out to be the conference's high water mark. Pulaski left after the 1943 football season, and Omro rejoined the conference for what would turn out to be its final season in 1944. After the dissolution of the Tri-County Football Conference, three of its members (Manawa, Marion and Waupaca) joined with Weyauwega to form the Central Wisconsin Conference's first football roster for the 1945 season. Omro joined the 7-C Conference for football (they were already members for other sports), and Bonduel and Kimberly competed as independents before joining the Mid-Valley Conference in 1946.

== Conference membership history ==
School	Location	Affiliation	Mascot	Colors	Seasons	Primary Conference
Kimberly	Kimberly, WI	Public	Papermakers		1934–1944	Little Nine
Manawa	Manawa, WI	Public	Wolves		1934–1944	Central Wisconsin
Marion	Marion, WI	Public	Mustangs		1934–1944	Central Wisconsin
Omro	Omro, WI	Public	Foxes		1934–1936, 1938–1941, 1944	7-C
Pulaski	Pulaski, WI	Public	Red Raiders		1937–1943	Independent
Bear Creek	Bear Creek, WI	Public	Bruins		1937	Little Nine
Waupaca	Waupaca, WI	Public	Comets		1940–1944	Central Wisconsin
Bonduel	Bonduel, WI	Public	Bears		1942–1944	Marinette & Oconto

== List of conference champions ==
School	Quantity	Years
Kimberly	7	1934, 1936, 1938, 1939, 1940, 1941, 1942
Marion	2	1936, 1937
Bonduel	1	1944
Pulaski	1	1941
Bear Creek	0	
Manawa	0	
Omro	0	
Waupaca	0	
