= Marathon County League =

Wisconsin high school athletic conference (1928-1949)

The Marathon County League is a former high school athletic conference in Wisconsin, comprising primarily schools in Marathon County. It was in existence from 1928 to 1949, and all member schools belonged to the Wisconsin Interscholastic Athletic Association.

== History ==
Location of Original Marathon County League Members

The Marathon County League, alternatively known as the Marathon County Athletic Association, was formed in 1928 as a basketball conference between five small Marathon County-based high schools in central Wisconsin: Athens, Edgar, Marathon, Mosinee, and Stratford. A sixth school was added in 1934 when Auburndale moved over from the neighboring Wood County League, and despite their location outside of Marathon County, the league did not change its name. Auburndale would leave the Marathon County League three years later before returning to the Wood County League. The conference lasted for just over two decades before four member schools (Athens, Edgar, Marathon and Stratford) joined former Wood County League members Auburndale, Pittsville and Rudolph in 1949 to form the new Marawood Conference. Mosinee, the only school not to participate in the new league, played as an independent before joining the Central Wisconsin Conference in 1950 and the Lumberjack Conference in 1953.

== Conference membership history ==
=== Final members ===
School	Location	Affiliation	Mascot	Colors	Joined	Left	Conference Joined	Current Conference
Athens	Athens, WI	Public	Bluejays		1928	1949	Marawood	
Edgar	Edgar, WI	Public	Wildcats		1928	1949	Marawood	
Marathon	Marathon, WI	Public	Red Raiders		1928	1949	Marawood	
Mosinee	Mosinee, WI	Public	Papermakers		1928	1949	Independent	Great Northern
Stratford	Stratford, WI	Public	Tigers		1928	1949	Marawood	

=== Previous members ===
School	Location	Affiliation	Mascot	Colors	Joined	Left	Conference Joined	Current Conference
Auburndale	Auburndale, WI	Public	Apaches		1934	1937	Wood County	Marawood

== List of conference champions ==
=== Boys Basketball ===
School	Quantity	Years
Mosinee	11	1930, 1931, 1932, 1933, 1934, 1939, 1942, 1945, 1946, 1947, 1949
Marathon	6	1929, 1940, 1941, 1943, 1944, 1945
Edgar	4	1936, 1937, 1938, 1948
Stratford	2	1935, 1938
Athens	1	1934
Auburndale	0	
