= Wood County League =

Wisconsin high school athletic conference (1925-1942)

The Wood County League is a former high school athletic conference in central Wisconsin. It existed from 1925 to 1942, and its members belonged to the Wisconsin Interscholastic Athletic Association.

== History ==
Location of Original Wood County League Members

The Wood County League was founded in 1925 by five small high schools in Wood County: Auburndale, Pittsville, Port Edwards, Rudolph, and the Wood County School of Agriculture. Milladore would become a member of the conference in 1927 but would only stay for a year before reentering in 1929. Biron would join the Wood County League that same year, bringing membership to its high of seven schools. They would only last a single season before leaving, and the conference continued as a six-member loop until 1934. Two schools left the Wood County League that year: Auburndale joined the neighboring Marathon County League, and Port Edwards became a member of the Big 7-C Conference. With Biron's reentry, the Wood County League had five member schools going into the 1934-35 school year. A sixth would join in 1936 (Junction City), bringing the roster back up to six schools. They would only last for one season, and with Milladore's exit from the league and Auburndale's return, five schools were in the conference in 1937. The number would decrease to four when Biron withdrew from the conference in 1939, only to rejoin 1940 and leave again in 1941 after not completing their league schedule the year prior. After several years of instability and the closing of the Wood County School of Agriculture, the Wood County League folded in 1942. Seven years after the dissolution of the Wood County League, three former members (Auburndale, Pittsville and Rudolph) would join four schools formerly in the Marathon County League (Athens, Edgar, Marathon and Stratford) to form the Marawood Conference.

== Conference membership history ==
=== Final members ===
School	Location	Affiliation	Mascot	Colors	Joined	Left	Conference Joined	Current Conference
Auburndale	Auburndale, WI	Public	Apaches		1925, 1937	1934, 1942	Marathon County, Independent	Marawood
Pittsville	Pittsville, WI	Public	Panthers		1925	1942	Independent	Central Wisconsin
Rudolph	Rudolph, WI	Public	Reindeer		1925	1942	Independent	Closed in 1962 (consolidated into Wisconsin Rapids)
Wood County School of Agriculture	Grand Rapids, WI	Public	Aggies		1925	1942	Closed	

=== Previous members ===
School	Location	Affiliation	Mascot	Colors	Joined	Left	Conference Joined	Current Conference
Biron	Biron, WI	Public	Boy Scouts	Unknown	1929, 1934, 1940	1930, 1939, 1941	Independent	Closed, date unknown (consolidated into Wisconsin Rapids)
Junction City	Junction City, WI	Public	Unknown	Unknown	1936	1937	Independent	Closed in 1949 (consolidated into Stevens Point)
Milladore	Milladore, WI	Public	Millies	Unknown	1927, 1929	1928, 1937	Independent	Closed in 1947 (district split between Stevens Point and Auburndale)
Port Edwards	Port Edwards, WI	Public	Blackhawks		1925	1934	Big 7-C	Central Wisconsin

== List of conference champions ==
=== Boys Basketball ===
School	Quantity	Years
Auburndale	6	1927, 1929, 1931, 1932, 1938, 1939
Port Edwards	3	1928, 1929, 1934
Rudolph	3	1940, 1941, 1942
Pittsville	2	1926, 1936
Wood County Aggies	2	1933, 1935
Biron	1	1937
Milladore	1	1930
Junction City	0	
