= Central Wisconsin Catholic Conference =

Wisconsin high school athletic conference (1956-2000)

The Central Wisconsin Catholic Conference is a former high school athletic conference in Wisconsin, active from 1956 to 2000. Consisting entirely of Catholic high schools within the La Crosse diocese, the conference was affiliated with both the Wisconsin Catholic Interscholastic Athletic Association and its successor, the Wisconsin Independent Schools Athletic Association.

== History ==
Location of Central Wisconsin Catholic Conference Members (1964–1975)

The Central Wisconsin Catholic Conference was formed by six parochial high schools in central Wisconsin in 1956. Original members were Assumption in Wisconsin Rapids, Campion Jesuit in Prairie du Chien, Columbus Catholic in Marshfield, McDonell Central Catholic in Chippewa Falls, Newman Catholic in Wausau and Pacelli in Stevens Point. Two other high schools were also part of the initial group (Aquinas in La Crosse and Regis in Eau Claire), but originally were not slated to join until 1957 because of previous athletic commitments. Madonna in Mauston and Maryheart in Pittsville were also invited to join the conference but declined due to smaller enrollment compared to the other eight schools.

In 1957, McDonell Central Catholic left the conference to compete as an independent, then returned as a full member four years later. Regis wouldn't officially join in CWCC competition until 1963, and Aquinas followed suit in 1964, bringing the conference to eight member schools. Campion would close in 1975, leaving the Central Wisconsin Catholic Conference with seven members. It would stay this way for nearly a quarter century until Aquinas was invited to join the Mississippi Valley Conference in 1996 with conference play starting the next year. In 1997, WISAA agreed to a merger with the Wisconsin Interscholastic Athletic Association to group public and private high schools under one organizational umbrella for interscholastic competition, finalizing in 2000. The Central Wisconsin Catholic Conference was folded along with WISAA that year, with its members going to the Central Wisconsin Conference (Pacelli), Cloverbelt Conference (McDonell Central Catholic and Regis) and Marawood Conference (Assumption, Columbus Catholic and Newman Catholic).

== Conference membership history ==
=== Final members ===
School	Location	Affiliation	Mascot	Colors	Joined	Left	Conference Joined	Current Conference
Assumption	Wisconsin Rapids, WI	Private (Catholic)	Royals		1956	2000	Marawood	
Columbus Catholic	Marshfield, WI	Private (Catholic)	Dons		1956	2000	Marawood	Cloverbelt
McDonell Central Catholic	Chippewa Falls, WI	Private (Catholic)	Macks		1956, 1961	1957, 2000	Cloverbelt	
Newman Catholic	Wausau, WI	Private (Catholic)	Cardinals		1956	2000	Marawood	
Pacelli	Stevens Point, WI	Private (Catholic)	Cardinals		1956	2000	Central Wisconsin	
Regis	Eau Claire, WI	Private (Catholic)	Ramblers		1963	2000	Cloverbelt	

=== Previous members ===
School	Location	Affiliation	Mascot	Colors	Joined	Left	Conference Joined	Current Conference
Aquinas	La Crosse, WI	Private (Catholic)	Blugolds		1964	1997	Mississippi Valley	
Campion Jesuit	Prairie du Chien, WI	Private (Catholic, Jesuit)	Red Knights		1956	1975	Closed	

== List of state champions ==
=== Fall sports ===
Boys Cross Country
School	Year	Organization	Division
Assumption	1974	WISAA	Class B
Columbus Catholic	1974	WISAA	Class C
Aquinas	1977	WISAA	Class A
Newman Catholic	1978	WISAA	Class B
Aquinas	1979	WISAA	Class A
Newman Catholic	1979	WISAA	Class B
Newman Catholic	1980	WISAA	Class B
Newman Catholic	1981	WISAA	Class B
Regis	1981	WISAA	Class C
Pacelli	1982	WISAA	Class B
Newman Catholic	1983	WISAA	Class B
McDonell Central Catholic	1984	WISAA	Class C
Newman Catholic	1984	WISAA	Class B
Newman Catholic	1985	WISAA	Class C
Pacelli	1985	WISAA	Class B
Pacelli	1986	WISAA	Class B
Pacelli	1987	WISAA	Class B
Pacelli	1988	WISAA	Class B
Newman Catholic	1989	WISAA	Class B
Pacelli	1990	WISAA	Class B
Pacelli	1991	WISAA	Class B
Pacelli	1994	WISAA	Division 2
Pacelli	1995	WISAA	Division 2
Pacelli	1996	WISAA	Division 2
McDonell Central Catholic	1997	WISAA	Division 2
McDonell Central Catholic	1998	WISAA	Division 2

Girls Cross Country
School	Year	Organization	Division
Pacelli	1981	WISAA	Class B
Pacelli	1982	WISAA	Class B
Columbus Catholic	1983	WISAA	Class B
Pacelli	1984	WISAA	Class B
Pacelli	1985	WISAA	Class B
Aquinas	1986	WISAA	Class A
Pacelli	1986	WISAA	Class B
Aquinas	1987	WISAA	Class A
Pacelli	1987	WISAA	Class B
Pacelli	1988	WISAA	Class B
Pacelli	1989	WISAA	Class B
Pacelli	1990	WISAA	Class B
Pacelli	1991	WISAA	Class B
McDonell Central Catholic	1994	WISAA	Division 2
Aquinas	1996	WISAA	Division 1
McDonell Central Catholic	1999	WISAA	Division 2

Football
School	Year	Organization	Division
Assumption	1973	WISAA	
Columbus Catholic	1980	WISAA	Class A
Pacelli	1986	WISAA	Class A
McDonell Central Catholic	1989	WISAA	Division 3
Columbus Catholic	1992	WISAA	Division 2
Regis	1992	WISAA	Division 3
Aquinas	1993	WISAA	Division 2
Regis	1993	WISAA	Division 3
Columbus Catholic	1994	WISAA	Division 3
Aquinas	1995	WISAA	Division 2
Pacelli	1995	WISAA	Division 3
Columbus Catholic	1996	WISAA	Division 3
Regis	1999	WISAA	Division 3

Golf
School	Year	Organization
Aquinas	1975	WISAA
Aquinas	1977	WISAA
Aquinas	1995	WISAA

Volleyball
School	Year	Organization	Division
Aquinas	1984	WISAA	Class A
Columbus Catholic	1991	WISAA	Class B
Regis	1992	WISAA	Division 2
Pacelli	1994	WISAA	Division 2
Regis	1995	WISAA	Division 2
Regis	1997	WISAA	Division 2
Regis	1998	WISAA	Division 2
McDonell Central Catholic	1999	WISAA	Division 2

=== Winter sports ===
Boys Basketball
School	Year	Organization	Division
McDonell Central Catholic	1994	WISAA	Division 3
Columbus Catholic	1996	WISAA	Division 3
Columbus Catholic	1997	WISAA	Division 3
Columbus Catholic	1999	WISAA	Division 3
Columbus Catholic	2000	WISAA	Division 3

Girls Basketball
School	Year	Organization	Division
Columbus Catholic	1980	WISAA	Class B
Newman Catholic	1981	WISAA	Class A
Regis	1986	WISAA	Class B
Regis	1992	WISAA	Division 2
Regis	1993	WISAA	Division 2
Aquinas	1996	WISAA	Division 2
Aquinas	1997	WISAA	Division 2
Assumption	1998	WISAA	Division 3
Assumption	1999	WISAA	Division 2
Columbus Catholic	1999	WISAA	Division 3
Columbus Catholic	2000	WISAA	Division 3

Wrestling
School	Year	Organization
Aquinas	1967	WCIAA
Aquinas	1968	WCIAA
Pacelli	1973	WISAA
Pacelli	1976	WISAA
Pacelli	1977	WISAA
Aquinas	1983	WISAA
Pacelli	1984	WISAA
Aquinas	1985	WISAA
Aquinas	1986	WISAA
Aquinas	1987	WISAA
Aquinas	1988	WISAA
Aquinas	1989	WISAA
Aquinas	1990	WISAA
Aquinas	1997	WISAA

=== Spring sports ===
Baseball
School	Year	Organization	Division
Pacelli	1974	WISAA	
Newman Catholic	1980	WISAA	
Aquinas	1984	WISAA	
Aquinas	1985	WISAA	
Aquinas	1986	WISAA	Class A
Aquinas	1987	WISAA	Class A
McDonell Central Catholic	1988	WISAA	Class B
Newman Catholic	1991	WISAA	Class B
Regis	1995	WISAA	Division 2
Pacelli	1998	WISAA	

Golf
School	Year	Organization
Aquinas	1970	WISAA
Campion Jesuit	1971	WISAA
Aquinas	1974	WISAA

Softball
School	Year	Organization	Division
Pacelli	1992	WISAA	Division 2
Pacelli	1993	WISAA	Division 2
Pacelli	1994	WISAA	Division 2
Pacelli	1995	WISAA	Division 2
Pacelli	1996	WISAA	Division 2
Pacelli	1997	WISAA	Division 2

Boys Tennis
School	Year	Organization
Campion Jesuit	1970	WISAA

Boys Track & Field
School	Year	Organization	Division
Assumption	1965	WCIAA	Class B
Columbus Catholic	1966	WCIAA	Class B
Assumption	1967	WCIAA	Class B
Assumption	1968	WCIAA	Class B
Newman Catholic	1971	WISAA	Class B
Pacelli	1978	WISAA	Class B
Aquinas	1980	WISAA	Class B
Aquinas	1981	WISAA	Class B
Aquinas	1982	WISAA	Class B
Pacelli	1983	WISAA	Class B
McDonell Central Catholic	1986	WISAA	Class C
Regis	1988	WISAA	Class B
Regis	1989	WISAA	Class B
Columbus Catholic	1992	WISAA	Division 2

Girls Track & Field
School	Year	Organization	Division
Newman Catholic	1971	WISAA	
Aquinas	1976	WISAA	
Aquinas	1977	WISAA	Class A
Aquinas	1978	WISAA	Class A
Aquinas	1981	WISAA	Class B
Assumption	1982	WISAA	Class B
McDonell Central Catholic	1984	WISAA	Class B
Pacelli	1985	WISAA	Class B
Pacelli	1986	WISAA	Class B
Regis	1987	WISAA	Class B
Regis	1993	WISAA	Division 2
Newman Catholic	1996	WISAA	Division 2
Aquinas	1997	WISAA	Division 1
McDonell Central Catholic	1998	WISAA	Division 2
McDonell Central Catholic	1999	WISAA	Division 2
McDonell Central Catholic	2000	WISAA	Division 2

== List of conference champions ==
=== Boys Basketball ===
School	Quantity	Years
Aquinas	12	1968, 1969, 1973, 1981, 1982, 1984, 1986, 1987, 1988, 1993, 1995, 1997
Regis	12	1965, 1966, 1967, 1970, 1971, 1974, 1975, 1982, 1985, 1990, 1992, 1994
Pacelli	10	1959, 1961, 1963, 1973, 1976, 1977, 1979, 1980, 1983, 1988
Assumption	7	1959, 1960, 1962, 1964, 1972, 1973, 1994
Newman Catholic	4	1957, 1978, 1989, 1998
Campion Jesuit	3	1957, 1958, 1970
Columbus Catholic	3	1996, 1999, 2000
McDonell Central Catholic	1	1991

=== Girls Basketball ===
School	Quantity	Years
Aquinas	11	1978, 1979, 1980, 1984, 1985, 1987, 1988, 1994, 1995, 1996, 1997
Regis	6	1986, 1990, 1991, 1992, 1993, 1998
Columbus Catholic	3	1998, 1999, 2000
Assumption	2	1977, 1998
Pacelli	2	1982, 1983
McDonell Central Catholic	1	1989
Newman Catholic	1	1981

=== Football ===
School	Quantity	Years
Columbus Catholic	15	1957, 1958, 1967, 1974, 1975, 1980, 1981, 1982, 1987, 1990, 1991, 1992, 1993, 1994, 1996
Pacelli	12	1962, 1971, 1972, 1974, 1976, 1978, 1981, 1986, 1987, 1994, 1995, 1998
Aquinas	9	1966, 1970, 1974, 1979, 1983, 1984, 1988, 1989, 1994
Assumption	8	1959, 1960, 1961, 1964, 1965, 1966, 1973, 1974
McDonell Central Catholic	4	1969, 1977, 1981, 1997
Regis	4	1968, 1974, 1985, 1999
Campion Jesuit	2	1963, 1964
Newman Catholic	1	1956
