= Northland Lutheran High School =

Location
- Kronenwetter, Wisconsin; United States; 44°50′40.8″N 89°37′52.2″W

Information
- Type: Private secondary school
- Religious affiliation: Lutheranism
- Denomination: Wisconsin Evangelical Lutheran Synod
- Established: 1979; 47 years ago
- Principal: Ryan Wiechmann
- Grades: 9–12
- Enrollment: 60-140
- Colors: White and navy
- Mascot: Wildcats
- Website: www.nlhs.org

Northland Lutheran High School is a Lutheran secondary school located in Kronenwetter, Wisconsin, in the United States. The school is affiliated with the Wisconsin Evangelical Lutheran Synod.

== History ==
In March 1979 Northland Lutheran High School formed an association and called John Schultz as the first Administrator. With two teachers, freshman and sophomore classes were established that September. The first school, located in Merrill, Wisconsin, consisted of portable classrooms.

Crisis came in the form of instability and the uncertainty of a firm direction. To gain strength from a stronger church base, Northland relocated to a temporary facility in Wausau in 1987. A building owned by St. Mary Catholic Church of Wausau was its home for many years to come.

On August 22, 1999 Northland dedicated its first permanent facility in Kronenwetter, Wisconsin.

== Student demographics ==
Enrollment has ranged from 60 to 140 students. Students travel from Neillsville, Marshfield, Wisconsin Rapids, Stevens Point, Plover, Birnamwood, Tomahawk, Eagle River, Rhinelander, Merrill, Medford, Athens, Marathon, and Wausau areas.

Being a Wisconsin Evangelical Lutheran Synod school, the ethnicity of the students is predominantly white of German descent (83%). The school has a large minority of Asian students(12%), mostly Hmong-Americans and Koreans. Multi-racial Americans make up 2%, American Indians 2%, and Hispanics of any race 1% of the student body.

== Sports ==
- Baseball
- Boys' Summer League Basketball
- Girls' Summer League Basketball
- Boys' basketball
- Girls' basketball
- Soccer
- Volleyball
- Softball
- Track and field
- Football

=== Athletic conference affiliation history ===
- Marawood Conference (2005-2017)
- Central Wisconsin Conference (2017–present)
