= Wings Arena =

Indoor ice hockey arena located in DeForest, Wisconsin

- Interactive map of Wings Arena
- Full name: Wings Arena at DeForest Yards
- Former names: LEGACY20 Arena (2024-2026)
- Location: DeForest, Wisconsin
- Coordinates: 43.1916°N 89.3225°W
- Owner: LEGACY20
- Operator: LEGACY20
- Capacity: 3,000
- Surface: Ice

Construction
- Groundbreaking: September 12, 2024
- Opened: November 13, 2026
- General contractor: Cascade Development

Tenants
- Madison Capitols (USHL) (2026–present); WIAA state hockey tournaments (2027–2029; contracted)

Wings Arena, officially Wings Arena at DeForest Yards and formerly known as LEGACY20 Arena at DeForest Yards, is a 3,000-seat indoor ice hockey arena located in DeForest, Wisconsin, a northeast suburb of Madison. The arena serves as the home of the Madison Capitols of the United States Hockey League.

The arena is part of DeForest Yards, a mixed-use development complex, and is owned and operated by LEGACY20, the operator of the Capitols owned by former NHL defenseman Ryan Suter.

== History ==
On April 29, 2024, the Madison Capitols and LEGACY20 announced DeForest Yards, a mixed-use entertainment district to open in 2025, comprising a housing development, a community space that would host an outdoor ice arena in the winter, and LEGACY20 Arena DeForest, a 3,000-seat indoor ice arena. Accordingly, Bob Suter's Capitol Ice Arena, the Middleton home to the Madison Capitols also owned by LEGACY20, would be renamed to Bob Suter's LEGACY20 Arena Middleton.

On December 2, 2025, an open letter from Capitols and LEGACY20 owner Ryan Suter announced that the team would be moving from LEGACY20 Arena Middleton to LEGACY20 Arena at DeForest Yards beginning with the 2026-27 USHL season.

On November 10, 2026, days before the Capitols' first game in DeForest, LEGACY20 announced that Colorado- and Minnesota-based Wings Credit Union had acquired naming rights to the arena, rebranding it to Wings Arena.

== Events and tenants ==
The arena's first event was planned to be a Madison Capitols game on October 17, 2026; on September 23, the Capitols announced that their first four home games of the 2026–27 season would be played in Middleton due to construction delays at the new arena. The first game in DeForest is scheduled for November 13, 2026.

On May 27, 2026, the Wisconsin Interscholastic Athletic Association announced that the state high school boys' and girls' ice hockey tournament would relocate from LEGACY20 Arena Middleton to LEGACY20 Arena DeForest on a three-year deal beginning in 2027.
