= Amherst High School (Wisconsin) =

Location
- 357 N Main Street; Amherst, Wisconsin 54406; United States; 44.4562°N 89.2853°W

Information
- Type: Public secondary
- Established: Spring 1891
- School district: Tomorrow River School District
- Principal: Mike Klieforth
- Teaching staff: 28.84 (FTE)
- Grades: 9-12
- Enrollment: 354 (2023-2024)
- Student to teacher ratio: 12.27
- Color
- Athletics conference: Central Wisconsin Conference
- Nickname: Falcons
- Rival: Iola-Scandinavia

Amherst High School is a public high school located in Amherst, Wisconsin. It serves grades 9 through 12 & is the only high school in the Tomorrow River School District.

== History ==
The first dedicated high school building in Amherst was constructed in the spring of 1891; classes started that fall. The school switched from a three-year to four-year track in 1902.

== Demographics ==
The student body of AHS is 95% white, 3% Hispanic, 1% Native American, and 1% of students identify as a part of two or more races.

== Academics ==
Advanced Placement classes are offered at Amherst; just over a third of students take an AP exam.

== Athletics ==
Falcons athletic teams compete in the Central Wisconsin Conference. The school debuted a synthetic turf stadium for the 2019-2020 school year for the football and soccer teams.

State Championships
Sport	Year(s)
Boys cross country	1959
Boys golf	2001
Boys track and field	2003
Girls basketball	1999, 2009
Football	2012, 2015, 2016, 2017
Softball	1999

=== Conference affiliation history ===
- Central Wisconsin Conference (1926-1970)
- Central State Conference (1970-1984)
- Central Wisconsin Conference (1984–present)

== Notable alumni ==
- Tyler Biadasz, football player
- Garrett Groshek, football player
- Brian E. Konkol, 20th president of Valparaiso University
- Dylan Page, basketball player
