= Ben Kissel =

American podcaster (born 1981)

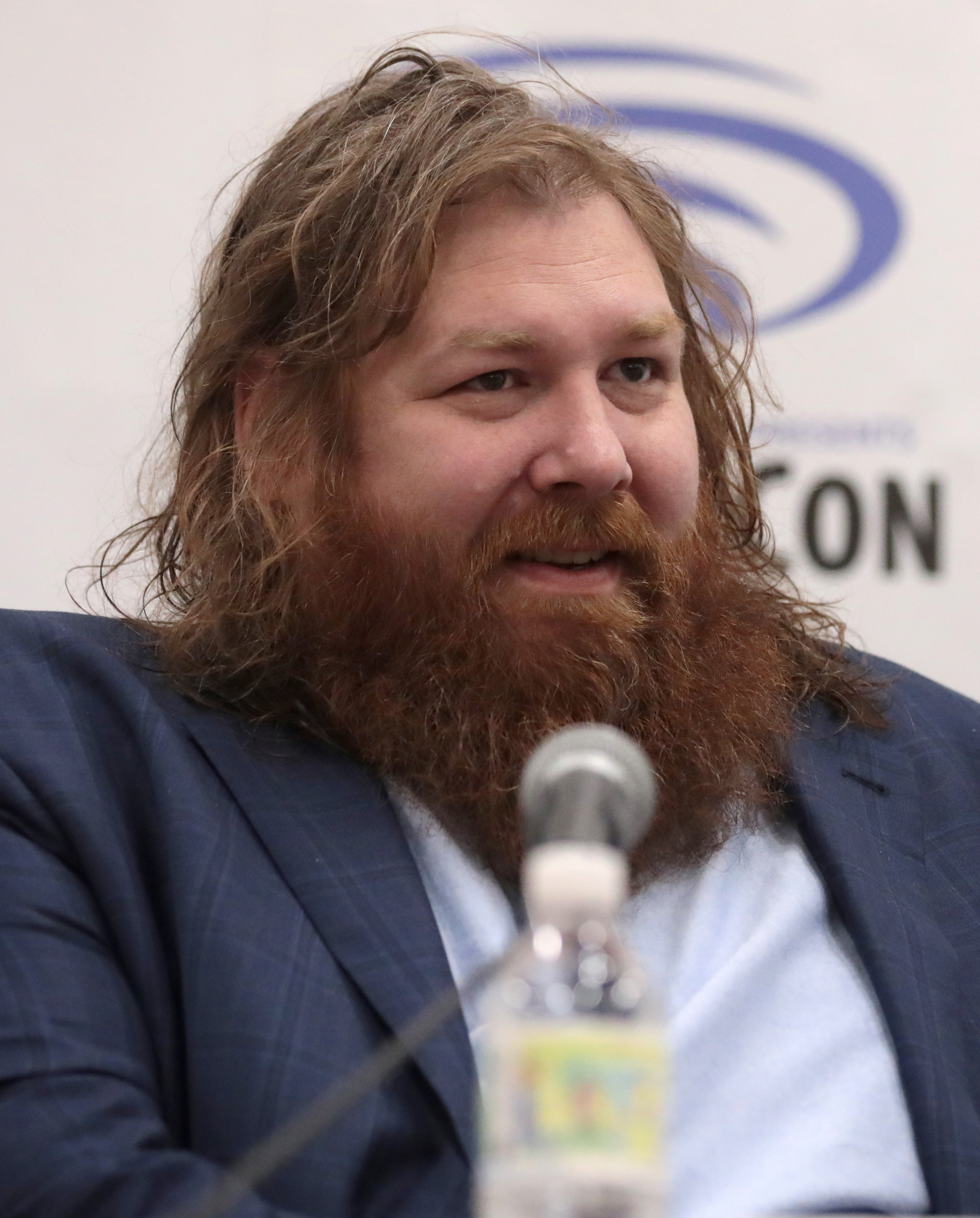
- Kissel at the 2015 San Diego Comic-Con
- Born: Benjamin Grant Kissel; 1981 (age 44–45); Fargo, North Dakota
- Other name: Benjamin Kissel
- Occupations: Actor; Comedian
- Years active: 2006–present
- Height: 6 ft 7 in (201 cm)
- Website: benkisselchannel.com

Benjamin Grant Kissel (born 1981) is an American podcaster, and the host of the OK Bud! podcast. Prior to OK Bud!, he co-hosted The Last Podcast on the Left which discussed serial killers, dark history, and true crime stories. He also appeared on the podcasts Roundtable of Gentlemen and hosted Abe Lincoln's Top Hat. In September of 2023, following allegations of domestic violence and emotional abuse, Kissel was dismissed from his role as co-host of The Last Podcast on the Left, and Last Podcast Network announced that he would no longer be involved with the network on October 13, 2023.

== Early life ==
Benjamin Grant Kissel was born in Fargo, North Dakota on July 21, 1981.

He is the son of a German immigrant father, Bengt Kissel, who along with his mother, Laura, raised him in a deeply religious home.

Ben was the youngest of three boys and was raised in a controversial church called Daystar. The family eventually moved to Stevens Point, Wisconsin.

His parents were very politically active in the church and Pro-Life movement with family dynamics being complicated by the fact that his two older brothers were gay and the family was frequently taking in foster children.

Ben attended Pacelli High School where he played football and wrestled.

Following high school, Ben attended UW-Stout where he began doing stand-up comedy at nineteen. He transferred to UW-Milwaukee, eventually graduating with a degree in Political science.

In 2006 Kissel moved to Brooklyn, New York to continue his career in comedy.

== Career ==
During his time in New York, Kissel had many odd jobs, with the most permanent one being that of a dogsitter.

Kissel began doing a show with the late Kevin Barnett called KBBK Comedy Deathmatch which hosted some of the biggest names in comedy at the time. With members of former New York sketch group Murderfist and Marcus Parks, Kissel and Barnett created the podcast The Roundtable of Gentlemen. Shortly after that show launched, Ben parlayed his knowledge of politics into another podcast, Abe Lincoln's Top Hat.

In 2011, Kissel co-created horror-comedy podcast The Last Podcast on the Left with Marcus Parks. Henry Zebrowski joined the pair in the third episode. Kissel, during his tenure, served the role of "audience surrogate", asking questions as Parks narrated and Zebrowski provided commentary. Last Podcast on the Left was the first podcast to do a show at Red Rocks in Denver, Colorado.

Kissel was a regular on Fox News Red Eye, briefly replaced Alan Colmes on Fox News Radio, and in 2023 hosted two shows on Sirius Radio's Faction Talk.

Kissel is a Webby Award recipient and collaborated on the New York Times best-selling true crime book The Last Book on the Left.

In September of 2023, it was announced that Kissel would be temporarily absent from Last Podcast on the Left amidst social media posts made by his ex, Taylor Moon, that alleged mistreatment and physical violence. Kissel has denied these allegations, and the posts have since been deleted, but in October of the same year, the remaining co-hosts released a statement that Kissel would not be returning to the show as he entered into therapy programs focused on his mental and physical health.

In 2024, Kissel announced that he is working on a new show called The Ben Kissel Channel. This evolved to become the OK! Bud podcast with Jerii Aquino and Kyle Ploof, which premiered in January 2025.

Comedy specials

Ben recorded three comedy specials with Last Podcast on the Left.

== Politics ==
In 2014, Kissel successfully challenged a 1964 ordinance on cross-dressing in Haddon Township, New Jersey, resulting in its repeal.

Ben Kissel identifies as an independent and in 2017, ran for Brooklyn Borough president against former NYC Mayor Eric Adams, receiving 1.8% of the vote. Kissel's platform included advocating for criminal justice reform, transportation issues in Brooklyn regarding the L Train, and rent control.
