= Pacelli High School (Stevens Point, Wisconsin) =

Location
- 1301 Maria Drive; Stevens Point, Wisconsin 54481; United States; 44°32′4″N 89°34′48″W

Information
- Type: Private
- Religious affiliation: Roman Catholic
- Established: 1955; 71 years ago
- Principal: Larry Theiss
- Grades: 9–12
- Gender: Co-educational
- Enrollment: 214
- Education system: Stevens Point Area Catholic Schools
- Colors: Red, Blue and White
- Mascot: Cardinals
- Accreditation: North Central Association of Colleges and Schools
- Website: pacelli.spacs.k12.wi.us

Pacelli High School is a private secondary school located on the north side of Stevens Point, Wisconsin in the Roman Catholic Diocese of La Crosse. The school, named in honor of Pope Pius XII, was founded in 1955 by Institute of the Brothers of the Christian Schools (Christian Brothers).

== History ==
Originally an all-boys high school, Pacelli merged with the all-girls Maria High School in the early 1970s to create a co-ed school offering a college-prep curriculum. The school is currently housed in the former Maria High School building. The former Pacelli building on Division Street is now home to the local YMCA. Pacelli High School became part of the Pacelli Catholic Schools system (called Stevens Point Area Catholic Schools until 2015) when consolidation of all the Catholic schools took place in 1986.

== Athletics ==
Pacelli's athletic teams are nicknamed the Cardinals, and they have been members of the Central Wisconsin Conference since 2000.

=== Athletic conference affiliation history ===
- Central Wisconsin Catholic Conference (1956-2000)
- Central Wisconsin Conference (2000–present)

== Notable alumni ==
- William A. Bablitch (1959), associate justice, Wisconsin Supreme Court, retired
- David Helbach, politician
- Ben Kissel, podcaster
- Brad Soderberg (1980), former head coach men's basketball University of Wisconsin and Saint Louis University
- Abbie Betinis (1997), composer
- Blessed James Miller, Religious Brother beatified in 2018
