= Stratford High School (Wisconsin) =

Location
- 522 N Third Avenue; Stratford, Wisconsin; United States; 43.504484°N 88.555250°W

Information
- Type: Public secondary
- Established: 1907
- School district: Stratford School District
- Principal: Janeen LaBorde
- Grades: 6–12
- Enrollment: 304 (2018-19)
- Colors: Orange and Black
- Athletics conference: Marawood
- Nickname: Tigers
- Website: www.stratford.k12.wi.us/o/ssd/page/mshs-landing-page

Stratford High School is a public high school located in Stratford, Wisconsin. It serves grades 9 through 12, and is the only high school in the Stratford School District.

== History ==
Stratford High School was built in 1907, with additions in 1936 and 1953.

== Academics ==
Advanced Placement classes are offered at Stratford.

== Athletics ==
Stratford's athletic teams are named the Tigers and compete in the Marawood Conference. Tigers football teams have won state championships in 1986, 2003, 2004, 2005, 2006, 2007, 2008 and 2022. Tigers wrestling teams won state championships in 2017 and 2018.

=== Athletic conference affiliation history ===
- Marathon County League (1928-1949)
- Marawood Conference (1949–present)

== Notable alumni ==
- Derek Kraus, NASCAR driver
