= Assumption High School (Wisconsin) =

Location
- 445 Chestnut Street; Wisconsin Rapids, Wisconsin 54494-4894; United States; 44°23′3″N 89°49′29″W

Information
- Type: Private, Coeducational College Preparatory
- Religious affiliation: Roman Catholic
- Established: September 4, 1951 (75 years ago)
- President: Michael Pipitone
- Principal: Amber France
- Chaplain: Joseph Glatczak
- Grades: 9–12
- Enrolment: 145
- Colors: Royal Blue and White
- Team name: Royals
- Accreditation: North Central Association of Colleges and Schools
- Website: www.assumptioncatholicschools.org/campuses/assumption-catholic-high-school.cfm

Assumption High School is a Roman Catholic high school in Wisconsin Rapids, Wisconsin, in the Diocese of La Crosse.

Assumption was established in 1951. It is the only high school in the Wisconsin Rapids Area Catholic Schools, which also operates one middle school and three primary/elementary schools.

== Athletics ==
The Assumption Royals compete in the Central Wisconsin Conference-Small for football and the Marawood Conference for all other athletics. Assumption is a member of the Wisconsin Interscholastic Athletic Association (WIAA). Its state titles include Division 5 girls’ basketball in 2013, 2016, 2021 and 2025, division 4 girls’ soccer in 2014, and softball in 2001 (division 3), 2005 (division 4), and 2021 (division 5).
