= Newman Catholic High School (Wausau, Wisconsin) =

Newman Catholic Middle and High School

Location
- 1130 West Bridge Street; Wausau, (Marathon County), Wisconsin 54401-2996; United States; 44°58′14″N 89°38′58″W

Information
- Type: Private, coeducational
- Religious affiliation: Roman Catholic
- Established: 1951
- President: Jeff Gulan
- Principal: Hilary Rinke
- Grades: 6 - 12
- Student to teacher ratio: 20:1
- Colors: Columbia blue and scarlet red
- Athletics: Football, Basketball, Soccer, Volleyball, Golf, Tennis, Track & Field
- Athletics conference: Marawood Conference
- Team name: Fighting Cardinals
- Accreditation: North Central Association of Colleges and Schools
- Newspaper: The Red Hat
- Website: newmancatholicschools.com

Newman Catholic High School is a Roman Catholic high school in Wausau, Wisconsin, United States, in the Diocese of La Crosse.

== Background ==
Newman Catholic was established in 1951. It is the only Catholic high school in Marathon County. The school has a student–teacher ratio of 20:1. The school was named in honor of John Henry Newman.

== Athletics ==
Newman Catholic's athletic nickname is the Cardinals, and their colors are Columbia Blue and Scarlet. They have been affiliated with the Marawood Conference and the WIAA since 2000.

=== Athletic conference affiliation history ===
- Central Wisconsin Catholic Conference (1956–2000)
- Marawood Conference (2000–present)

== Notable alumni ==
- Jack Koltes (class of 1960): Notre Dame Fighting Irish men's basketball
- Jim DeLisle (class of 1967): football defensive tackle for the Green Bay Packers; professor of real estate at the University of Washington
- Jerry Petrowski (class of 1968): member of the Wisconsin State Senate, 29th district; former member of the Wisconsin State Assembly
- John H. Robinson (class of 1973): former member of the Wisconsin State Assembly, 85th district
- Michael Alfonso (class of 2018): politician and representative-elect for Wisconsin's 7th congressional district
