= Marion High School (Wisconsin) =

Coordinates: 44°40′22.9″N 88°53′13.4″W

Marion Junior/Senior High School

Location
- 105 School St; Marion, Wisconsin, USA

Information
- Type: Public
- Opened: September 1971
- School district: Marion School District
- Staff: 17.74 (FTE)
- Grades: 7-12
- Enrollment: 216 (2023-2024)
- Average class size: 21
- Student to teacher ratio: 12.18
- Hours in school day: 8:05 AM to 3:17 PM
- Campus: Suburban
- Colors: Blue and gold
- Mascot: Mustang

Marion Junior/Senior High School is a high school in Marion, Wisconsin, that serves students in grades 7 through 12. It has an enrollment of approximately 200 students. The school colors are blue and gold and the mascot is a Mustang.

== Marion School District ==
The school district comprises territory along the boundary of Shawano and Waupaca counties, and includes the communities of Caroline, Leopolis, and the Town of Pella. At one time, Caroline had its own elementary school, however, because of low enrollment it was sold to the local American Legion group. Students from Caroline have attended Marion's elementary school since the early 1980s.

Although Marion has had several high school and elementary buildings in its history, the main building has usually been on School Street in downtown Marion. The elementary school and the high school were at one time in the same building. A fire in 1985 caused high school classes to be moved to the elementary school, while elementary classes were moved to various locations around Marion, such as churches, while a new high school, connected to the old gymnasium, was built on School Street. The separate elementary building for K–6 is located five blocks north of the junior-senior high school, just off Main Street. A field house was added to the elementary school in 1998, where many events are now held.

== Extracurricular activities ==
Marion High School has extracurricular programs, such as music, FFA, FCCLA, forensics, and other academic groups. Every year, students represent the school at state and national levels in FFA, as well as at state competitions in music and forensics.

=== Athletics ===
Marion High School participates in the Central Wisconsin Conference – Small division, or CWC-Small, in the following sports: cross country, football, volleyball, basketball, baseball, softball, golf, and track and field. Local churches and groups also sponsor summer baseball and softball teams and tournaments.

==== Wrestling ====
Although Marion High School discontinued its wrestling program because of declining participation, the school had its first state champion in 1997.

In February 2015, Marion approved a wrestling co-op with the neighboring city of Clintonville.

==== Track and field ====
A Marion High School pole vaulter took first at the state meet in 1995.

==== Cross country ====
The cross country program was discontinued for many years because of declining involvement, however, it experienced a resurgence in the late 1990s. This was followed by the boys' team finishing seventh at the state meet in 1997.

==== Softball ====
The softball team won the WIAA State Class C tournament in 1985, 1986, 1988, 1990, 1991, and 1992.

==== Baseball ====
The baseball team captured its first WIAA State Championship in 2009.

==== Golf ====
With the building of Marion's first community golf course, Perry's Landing, a golf team was started. The golf season is in the spring and both boys and girls are allowed to play.

==== Basketball ====
The girls' basketball team lost to Iola in the regional playoffs in 2000. It won the CWC-10 Conference championship in 2014.

The boys' basketball team, in both the 2010–11 and 2011–12 seasons, lost in the sectional finals, capping 21-win seasons. The 2011–12 team's sectional loss was to Sam Dekker and the Sheboygan Lutheran Crusaders. Dekker went on to star for the Wisconsin Badgers and the Houston Rockets. The boys' basketball team also won the Wisconsin State Championship in the 1950s, coached by Leslie C. Ansorge. On that team was Ned Wulk, who would eventually become the all-time leader in career wins as head basketball coach at Arizona State University.

Dick Bennett, former basketball coach at the University of Wisconsin–Green Bay, University of Wisconsin–Stevens Point, University of Wisconsin–Madison, and Washington State University, began his basketball coaching career at Marion High School.

==== Football ====
Marion had no varsity football victories from the 1999 season finale until 2004. Marion won two games that year. Beginning in the 2009 season, the football team combined with Tigerton High School. The co-op team is known as the Marion–Tigerton Thundercatz. The co-op was created because of declining participation for both schools.

== Notable alumni ==
- Ken Frailing of the Chicago White Sox and Chicago Cubs is a Marion High School graduate.
