= Wisconsin Football Coaches Association =

- Sport: American football
- Founded: 1975
- President: John Hoch Lancaster High School
- Website: http://www.wifca.org

The Wisconsin Football Coaches Association is an association of American football coaches on all levels within the state of Wisconsin. An annual clinic of members is held in Madison, Wisconsin to promote the sport, primarily at the high school level. The organization also selects a high school all-state team following each season and selects players and coaches who take part in the state all-star game each summer. This game is played at Titan Stadium, on the campus of the University of Wisconsin-Oshkosh each July.

== Objectives ==
The organization was created for the purpose of making its member coaches aware of the latest techniques of teaching the game of football and form a network of communication between the coaches in the state of Wisconsin. The organization has also been invaluable in giving the coaches a voice to communicate with the sports governing bodies such as the Wisconsin Interscholastic Athletic Association (WIAA) and the National Federation of State High School Associations (NFHS). The organization also promotes the idea of professionalism within the coaching ranks and is a source of comradery and fraternity for its members.

== Origins ==
The WFCA had its beginning in the Spring of 1975 at a football clinic sponsored by the Wisconsin Coaches Association. Burt Hable of Madison West High School, chaired a meeting during which a steering committee was selected to facilitate the forming of a football coaches ONLY association. This committee that met at the WIAA offices in Stevens Point, Wisconsin on May 2, 1975. A constitution for the association was written and plans were made to contact every head football coach of a public school. Each coach received a copy of the proposed constitution along with a letter explaining the Wisconsin High School Football Coaches Association (WHSFCA) and requesting names of coaches to serve as representatives. On December 1, 1975, at the WIAA offices, the steering committee decided that in order to facilitate the existence of the WHSFCA for 1975-76 the acting officers for the Association for the first year should be selected from the membership of the steering committee and the Board of Directors, would then be selected from a vote of head football coaches within the membership. The following were selected:

- President - Ira Rebella - Merrill High School
- Vice President (Northern at Large) - Pete Adler - Durand High School
- Vice President (Southern at Large) - John Brodie - Homestead High School
- Secretary/Treasurer - Cal Callaway - Oregon High School
