= Marathon High School (Wisconsin) =

High school in Wisconsin, United States

Coordinates: 44.9331°N 89.8335°W

Location
- 204 East Street; Marathon, (Marathon County), Wisconsin 54448; United States

Information
- Type: Public high school
- Principal: Dave Beranek
- Staff: 22.36 (FTE)
- Enrollment: 282 (2023-2024)
- Student to teacher ratio: 12.61
- Colors: Red and white
- Fight song: "Notre Dame Fight Song"
- Athletics conference: Marawood Conference
- Nickname: Red Raiders

Marathon High School is a public secondary school located in Marathon City, Wisconsin, United States. It has an enrollment of roughly 250 students in grades 9 through 12.

In 2007 the school received the United States Department of Education Blue Ribbon School Program Award.

== General ==
- School motto: "Our Children, Our Community, Our Future"
- Athletic motto: "Go Big Red"
- Student to teacher ratio: 14:1
- School colors: Red, black, and white
- School mascot: Red Raider (pirate)
- School song: tune of "Notre Dame Victory March"
- Current district administrator: Richard Parks
- Current principal: Dave Beranek

== Building ==
The high school building, located at 204 East St., originally built in 1963, was remodeled in 2006 with an addition that incorporated a community wellness center, a gymnasium, math wing, a technology education suite, a greenhouse, an agriculture classroom, an art studio, a performing arts studio, and remodeled science laboratories. The building went through further renovations in 2015 with resurfacing of the gym floor and new seats in the auditorium. The track was removed and replaced in 2016.

== Extracurricular activities ==
- Future Business Leaders of America (FBLA) promotes business skill development. Students learn how to work in the business world, and to become effective employees or supervisors. The group sends students to the national competition to compete in business skills.
- Academic Decathlon has a curriculum based on a yearly theme. They participate in local, regional, state and online national competitions. The Academics team has gone to state for 28 consecutive years (as of 2017).
- FFA has fundraisers and other programs that help students learn about agriculture: fruit sales, greenhouse sales, speaking contests, agricultural technology contests, and Food for America.
- The Marathon Marching Red Raider Band performs in multiple parades each summer. The band is student-led and has won five state championships.
- Concert Choir is a class offered at the high school. Every other year there is a play production, and the other years offer a "pops concert".
- Forensics is a club where students give oral presentations to a panel of judges.
- Other: Concert band, jazz band, vocal jazz, ecology club, Spanish club, student council, National Honor Society, PRIDE, Raider Review, Tech Ed Club, Skills U.S.A., and Math League.

== Athletics ==
The Red Raider Nation, as the students call themselves, has varsity sports in the WIAA division 4 small school sports for boys: football, cross country, basketball, wrestling, baseball, track and field, and golf; and for girls: volleyball, cross country, cheerleading, basketball, softball, track and field, gymnastics, and golf. All teams compete in the Marawood South Conference. The school has won 19 state championships, most recently in boys' track and field (2016, 2015) boys' basketball (2011), boys' baseball (2010, 2008), and marching band (2006).

The Red Raider Nation's biggest rival is Edgar High School.

Most athletic events are broadcast live on WTDX WTDX, ESPN Sports Fan 100.5 radio in Rothschild, Wisconsin.

=== Athletic championships ===
The Marathon Red Raiders have won many conference championships. The Marawood conference is a competitive conference consisting of 12 schools, divided into north and south. MHS has won 111 conference championships, listed below:

- Boys' basketball: 26
- Boys' track and field: 25
- Baseball: 13
- Girls' track and field: 13
- Football: 8
- Softball: 7
- Girls' basketball: 8
- Volleyball: 6
- Boys' cross country: 3
- Wrestling: 1
- Golf: 1
- Girls' cross country: 0

=== Athletic conference affiliation history ===
- Marathon County League (1928-1949)
- Marawood Conference (1949–present)
