= Stratford, Wisconsin =

- Village
- Location of Stratford in Marathon County, Wisconsin.
- Coordinates: 44°48′7″N 90°4′26″W
- Country: United States
- State: Wisconsin
- County: Marathon

Area
  - Total: 5.34 sq mi (13.83 km^{2})
  - Land: 5.31 sq mi (13.74 km^{2})
  - Water: 0.035 sq mi (0.09 km^{2})
- Elevation: 1,266 ft (386 m)

Population (2020)
  - Total: 1,581
  - Density: 298.0/sq mi (115.1/km^{2})
- Time zone: UTC-6 (Central (CST))
  - Summer (DST): UTC-5 (CDT)
- Area codes: 715 & 534
- FIPS code: 55-77750
- GNIS feature ID: 1574972
- Website: www.stratfordwi.com

Stratford is a village in Marathon County, Wisconsin, United States. It is part of the Wausau, Wisconsin Metropolitan Statistical Area. The population was 1,581 at the 2020 census.

== History ==
Stratford was platted in 1891 when the railroad was extended to that point. The village was named after Stratford-upon-Avon, in England.

== Geography ==
Stratford is located at 44°48′7″N 90°4′26″W (44.801971, -90.073829). According to the United States Census Bureau, the village has a total area of 5.35 square miles (13.86 km^{2}), of which 5.31 square miles (13.75 km^{2}) is land and 0.04 square miles (0.10 km^{2}) is water.

== Demographics ==
Historical population
Census	Pop.	Note	%±
1910	763		—
1920	1,014		32.9%
1930	960		−5.3%
1940	879		−8.4%
1950	962		9.4%
1960	1,106		15.0%
1970	1,239		12.0%
1980	1,385		11.8%
1990	1,515		9.4%
2000	1,523		0.5%
2010	1,578		3.6%
2020	1,581		0.2%
U.S. Decennial Census

=== 2010 census ===
As of the census of 2010, there were 1,578 people, 666 households, and 433 families living in the village. The population density was 297.2 inhabitants per square mile (114.7/km^{2}). There were 713 housing units at an average density of 134.3 per square mile (51.9/km^{2}). The racial makeup of the village was 98.5% White, 0.2% African American, 0.2% Native American, 0.1% Asian, 0.4% from other races, and 0.6% from two or more races. Hispanic or Latino of any race were 1.6% of the population.

There were 666 households, of which 33.3% had children under the age of 18 living with them, 50.8% were married couples living together, 8.7% had a female householder with no husband present, 5.6% had a male householder with no wife present, and 35.0% were non-families. 31.4% of all households were made up of individuals, and 13.4% had someone living alone who was 65 years of age or older. The average household size was 2.37 and the average family size was 2.97.

The median age in the village was 37.3 years. 26.9% of residents were under the age of 18; 7% were between the ages of 18 and 24; 27.6% were from 25 to 44; 24.5% were from 45 to 64; and 14% were 65 years of age or older. The gender makeup of the village was 49.9% male and 50.1% female.

=== 2000 census ===
As of the census of 2000, there were 1,523 people, 603 households, and 413 families living in the village. The population density was 287.6 people per square mile (110.9/km^{2}). There were 648 housing units at an average density of 122.4 per square mile (47.2/km^{2}). The racial makeup of the village was 98.16% White, 0.39% Native American, 1.18% Asian, and 0.26% from two or more races. Hispanic or Latino of any race were 0.98% of the population.

There were 603 households, out of which 34.8% had children under the age of 18 living with them, 57.7% were married couples living together, 7.6% had a female householder with no husband present, and 31.5% were non-families. 25.7% of all households were made up of individuals, and 12.6% had someone living alone who was 65 years of age or older. The average household size was 2.50 and the average family size was 3.06.

In the village, the population was spread out, with 27.1% under the age of 18, 8.5% from 18 to 24, 31.8% from 25 to 44, 19.0% from 45 to 64, and 13.7% who were 65 years of age or older. The median age was 34 years. For every 100 females, there were 97.3 males. For every 100 females age 18 and over, there were 96.3 males.

The median income for a household in the village was $42,569, and the median income for a family was $51,250. Males had a median income of $31,793 versus $23,352 for females. The per capita income for the village was $17,934. About 4.6% of families and 6.0% of the population were below the poverty line, including 9.4% of those under age 18 and 12.2% of those age 65 or over.

== Education ==
The Stratford School District is made up of two separate buildings: Stratford Elementary and Stratford Junior/Senior High.

St. Joseph's Catholic school (K-8) is also located in Stratford.

== Library ==
The Marathon County Public Library has a branch library in Stratford.

== Notable people ==
- Raymond Leo Burke, Roman Catholic cardinal
- William D. Connor, founder of Stratford, Lieutenant Governor of Wisconsin
- Christian Franzen, Wisconsin State Representative
- Macey Kilty, Team USA wrestler and 2018 Cadet World champion
- Derek Kraus, NASCAR driver
- Bob Kulp, businessman and politician
- Andrew Rock, 2004 Olympic gold medalist in track
- Rich Seubert, professional football player for the New York Giants
- Jack Zimmerman, professional rapper, aka Big Zimma

== See also ==
- List of villages in Wisconsin
