= Marion, Wisconsin =

- City
- Location of Marion in Waupaca (below) and Shawano (above) counties, Wisconsin

- Location within Wisconsin Location within the United States
- Coordinates: 44°40′21″N 88°53′11″W
- Country: United States
- State: Wisconsin
- Counties: Waupaca, Shawano
- Incorporated (village): December 12, 1898
- Incorporated (city): July 29, 1939

Government
  - Mayor: Christopher Goke

Area
  - Total: 2.59 sq mi (6.71 km^{2})
  - Land: 2.45 sq mi (6.35 km^{2})
  - Water: 0.14 sq mi (0.36 km^{2})
- Elevation: 850 ft (259 m)

Population (2020)
  - Total: 1,324
  - Density: 540/sq mi (209/km^{2})
- Time zone: UTC-6 (Central (CST))
  - Summer (DST): UTC-5 (CDT)
- Area codes: 715 & 534
- FIPS code: 55-49400
- GNIS feature ID: 1569041
- Website: cityofmarionwi.gov

Marion is a city in Shawano and Waupaca counties in the U.S. state of Wisconsin. The population was 1,324 at the 2020 census.

== History ==
The Marion Post Office has been serving the community since its establishment in 1880. The city was named for Francis Marion, an officer during the American Revolution.

Marion is home to a sizeable Amish community, who settled there in 1995. As of 2024, the town had 575 Amish residents divided among five church districts.

== Geography ==
Marion is located at 44°40′21″N 88°53′11″W (44.672573, -88.886284).

According to the United States Census Bureau, the city has a total area of 2.58 square miles (6.68 km^{2}), of which 2.45 square miles (6.35 km^{2}) is land and 0.13 square miles (0.34 km^{2}) is water. Most of the city lies in Waupaca County, with only a small portion extending into Shawano County.

== Demographics ==
Historical population
Census	Pop.	Note	%±
1880	161		—
1890	470		191.9%
1900	602		28.1%
1910	798		32.6%
1920	875		9.6%
1930	992		13.4%
1940	1,034		4.2%
1950	1,118		8.1%
1960	1,200		7.3%
1970	1,218		1.5%
1980	1,348		10.7%
1990	1,242		−7.9%
2000	1,297		4.4%
2010	1,260		−2.9%
2020	1,324		5.1%
U.S. Decennial Census

=== 2020 census ===
As of the census of 2020, there were 1,324 people residing in the city. 1,310 lived in the Waupaca County portion, and 14 in Shawano County portion.

== Education ==
Public education is provided by the Marion School District. The District includes the Marion Elementary School, Marion Middle School, and Marion High School.
