= Columbus Catholic High School (Marshfield, Wisconsin) =

Private school in Marshfield, Wisconsin, United States

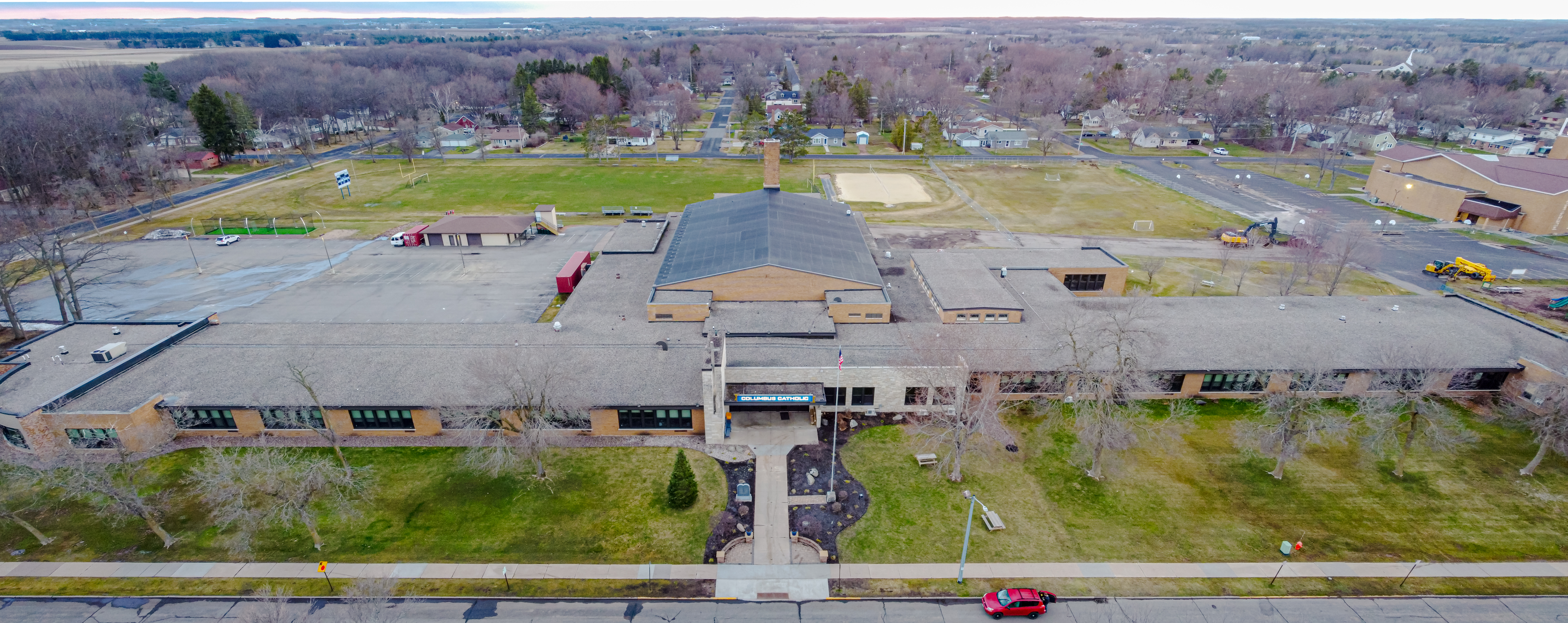

Location
- 710 South Columbus Avenue; Marshfield, (Wood County), Wisconsin 54449; United States; 44°39′50″N 90°11′34″W

Information
- Type: Private, coeducational
- Religious affiliation: Roman Catholic
- President: David Eaton
- Principal: Michael Lambrecht
- Chaplain: Jared Clements
- Grades: 9–12
- Average class size: 17
- Student to teacher ratio: 12 to 1
- Colors: Navy blue and white
- Song: Anchors Away
- Athletics: Boys' cross-country, football (co-op with Spencer High School), basketball, baseball, golf, track and field, golf; girls' tennis, cross country, volleyball, basketball, softball, track and field; co-ed soccer
- Team name: Dons
- Accreditation: North Central Association of Colleges and Schools
- Athletic Director: Joe Konieczny
- Website: School website

Columbus Catholic High School is a private, Roman Catholic high school in Marshfield, Wisconsin. It is located in the Roman Catholic Diocese of La Crosse and is one of two Catholic high schools in Wood County.

In 2024 they won the Division 5 Boys Basketball State Championship, beating Abundant Life Christian School in the final while setting a state record for the number of three-pointers in a game.

== Notable alumni ==
- Rich Seubert, NFL player for the New York Giants
