= Thorp High School (Wisconsin) =

Coordinates: 44°57′14.4″N 90°47′41.3″W

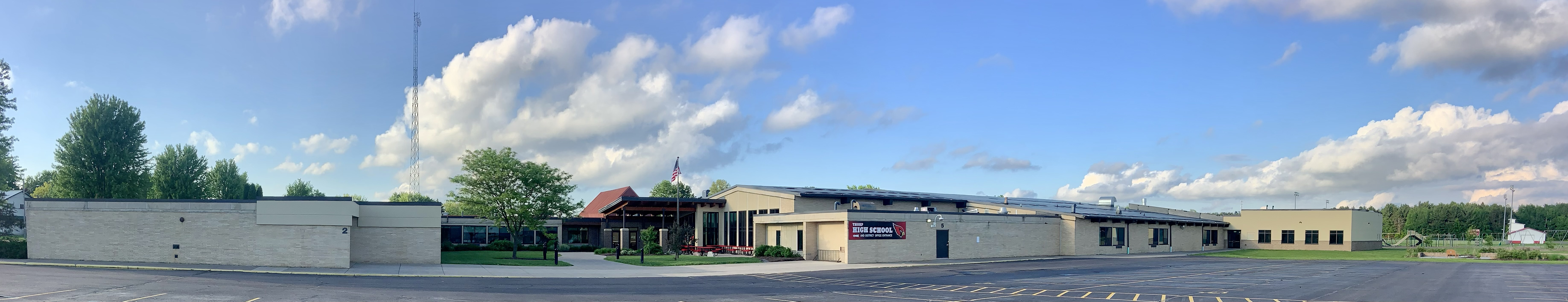
- 605 South Clark St. Thorp, Wisconsin 54771; United States

Information
- Type: Public
- School district: School District of Thorp
- Superintendent: Angela Hanlin
- Principal: Adrian Foster
- Teaching staff: 14.07 (FTE)
- Grades: 9-12
- Enrollment: 173 (2023–2024)
- Student to teacher ratio: 12.30∶1
- Color
- Athletics conference: Cloverbelt Conference
- Mascot: Cardinal
- Website: Official website

Thorp High School is a secondary school in Thorp, in Clark County, Wisconsin, United States. The school is located just north of Wisconsin Highway 29 in the small community of Thorp, Wisconsin which is 60 miles west of Wausau and 42 miles east of Eau Claire.

== Demographics ==
For the 2020–21 academic year, Thorp High School (Wisconsin) enrolled 170 students, according to the National Center for Education Statistics. The school employed 14.0 full-time equivalent educators, resulting in a student to teacher ratio of 12.1:1.

Enrollment by race and ethnicity (2020–21)
Race and ethnicity^{†}	Enrolled pupils	Percentage
African American	1	0.59%
Asian	2	1.18%
Hispanic	1	0.59%
Native American	0	0%
White	165	97.06%
Native Hawaiian, Pacific islander	0	0%
Multi-race	1	0.59%
Total	170	100%
^{†} "Hispanic" includes Hispanics of any race. All other categories refer to non-Hispanics.

Enrollment by gender (2020–21)
Gender	Enrolled pupils	Percentage
Female	94	55.29%
Male	76	44.71%
Non-binary	0	0%
Total	170	100%

Enrollment by grade (2020–21)
Grade	Enrolled pupils	Percentage
9	48	28.24%
10	36	21.18%
11	45	26.47%
12	41	24.12%
Ungraded	0	0%
Total	170	100%

== Athletics ==
Thorp High offers the following athletic activities in the Cloverbelt Conference.

- Basketball (boys' and girls')
- Baseball
- Cheerleading
- Football
- Golf
- Softball
- Track
- Wrestling
- Volleyball

Thorp High School athletic state championships include football (1993), boys' basketball (2014), and softball (2016).

=== Athletic conference affiliation history ===
- Cloverbelt Conference (1927–present)
