= McDonell Central Catholic High School =

Location
- 1316 Bel Air Boulevard; Chippewa Falls, (Chippewa County), Wisconsin 54729; United States; 44°56′8″N 91°24′50″W

Information
- Type: Private, Coeducational
- Religious affiliation: Roman Catholic
- Established: 1883
- Founder: Alexander B. McDonell
- President: Molly Bushman
- Principal: Brian Schulner
- Grades: 9–12
- Average class size: 20-35
- Colors: Royal blue and white
- Fight song: On Wisconsin
- Athletics conference: Cloverbelt and Cloverwood
- Mascot: Macks (Bulldog)
- Nickname: Macks
- Team name: McDonell Macks
- Rival: Regis, Burlington Catholic and Gilman
- Accreditation: North Central Association of Colleges and Schools
- Website: School website

McDonell Central Catholic High School is a Roman Catholic high school in Chippewa Falls, Wisconsin in the Diocese of La Crosse. It is the only Catholic high school in Chippewa County.

== History ==
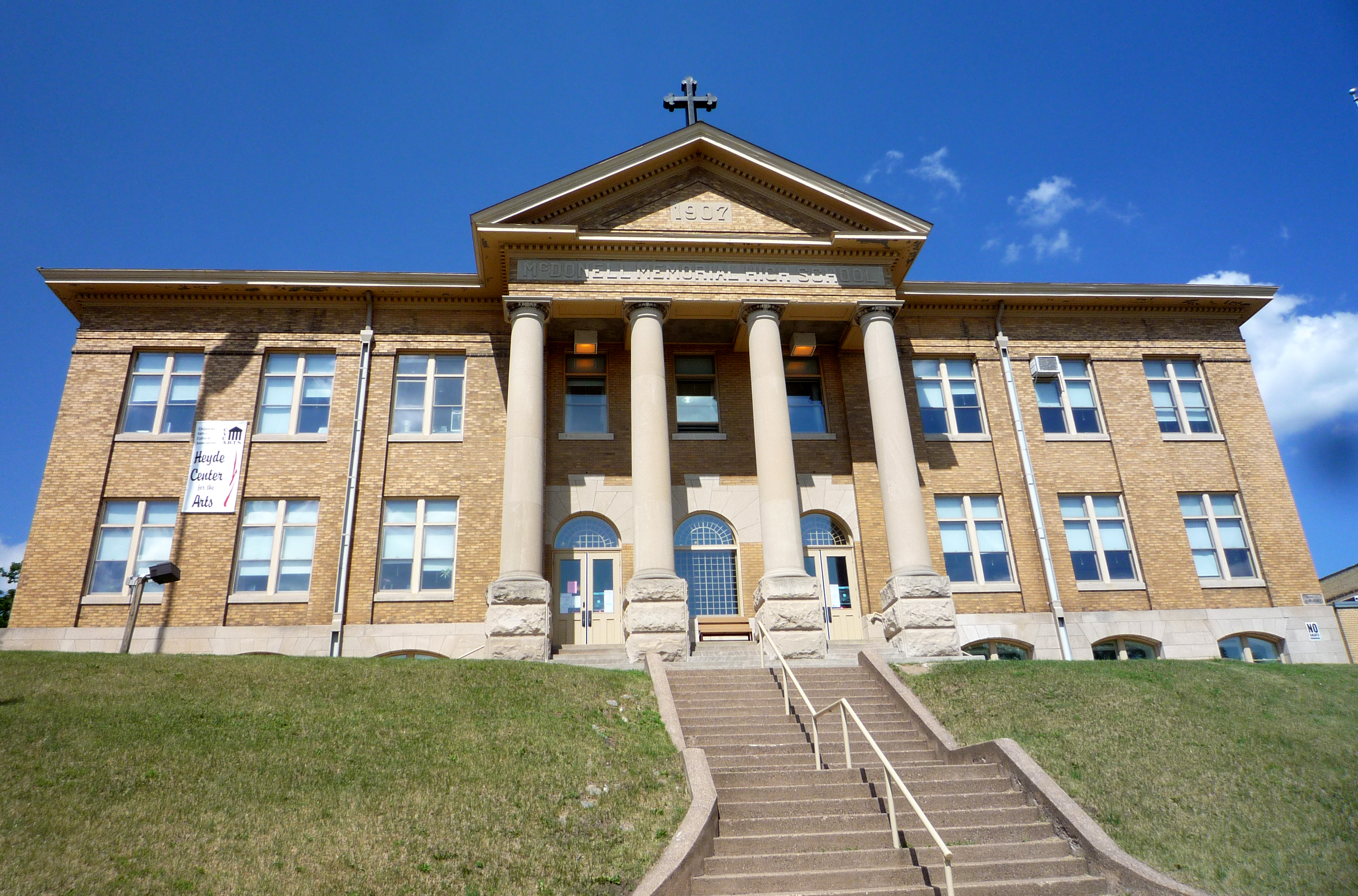
Heyde Center for the Arts- original Catholic high school

The first McDonell Catholic High School was built in 1907, on a site overlooking downtown Chippewa Falls. It is listed on the State and National Register of Historic Places. It was named in memory of Alexander B. McDonell's wife. He was a city leader and lumberman at the time, and donated a majority of the funds to have the school built. Prior to being named McDonell, the school was known as Notre Dame School.

Later this building was vacant for a period after the diocese relocated the high school to a larger, more suburban facility. It was purchased by the Chippewa Valley Cultural Association and converted in 2000 into the Heyde Center for the Arts.

McDonell Central Catholic High School is located at 1316 Bel Air Boulevard.

== Sports ==
The McDonell Central football coach Gerry Uchytil was elected into the state's football coaches hall of fame.

In 1997, the football team won the CWCC conference title. It was the team's last conference title before the folding of WISSA.

In 2009 the Macks lost to Burlington Catholic High School in the state championship.

In 2016, the Macks won the WIAA men's division five basketball championship game.

In 2025, the Macks won the WIAA 8-man football state championship.

=== Athletic conference affiliation history ===
- Central Wisconsin Catholic Conference (1956-1957)
- Bi-State Catholic Conference (1960-1961)
- Central Wisconsin Catholic Conference (1961-2000)
- Cloverbelt Conference (2000–present)

== Notable alumni ==
- Kyle Cody - baseball player
- Terry A. Willkom - politician, former Wisconsin State Assembly member
