= Athens, Wisconsin =

- Village
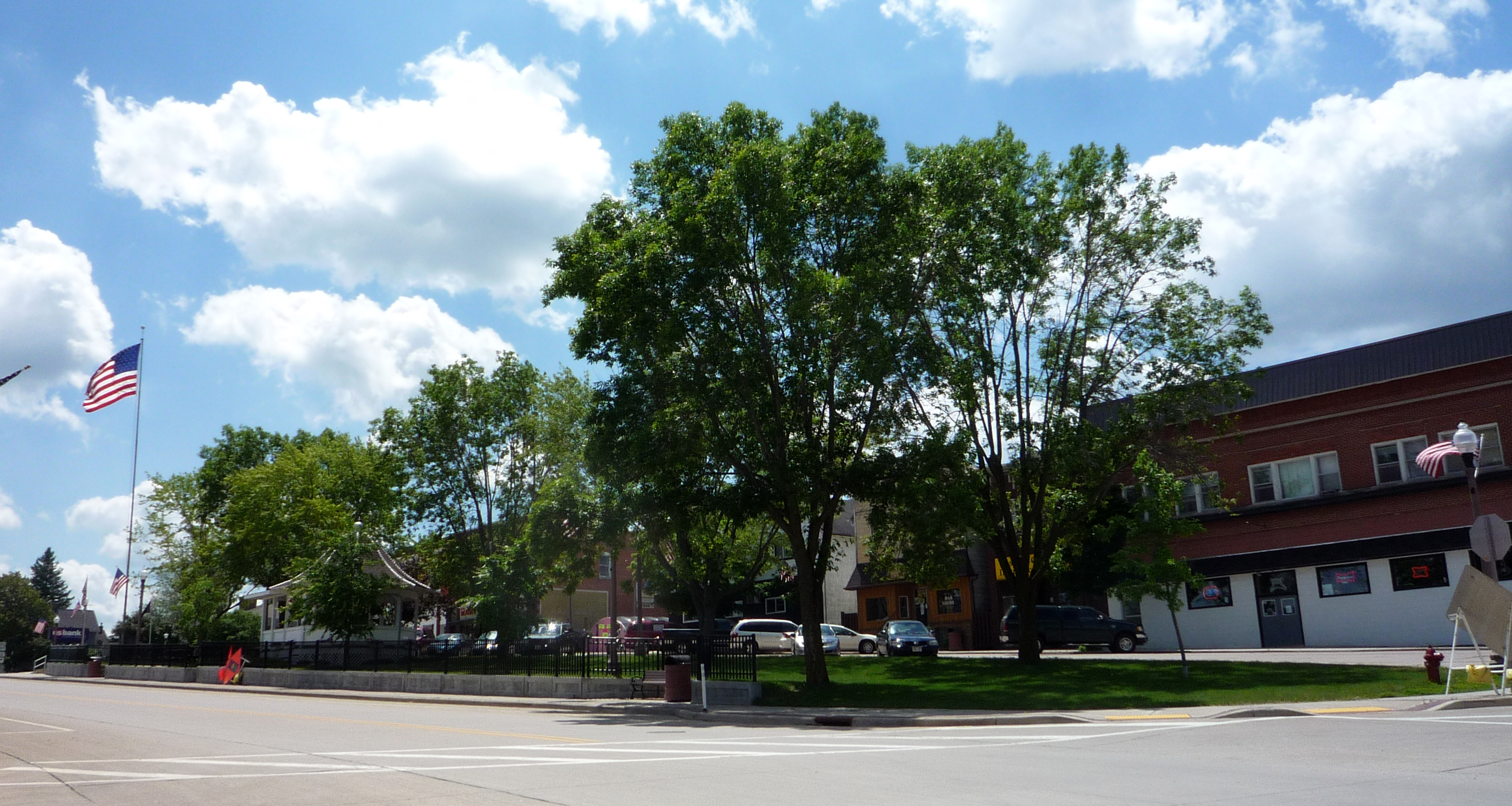
- Downtown Athens

- Location of Athens in Marathon County, Wisconsin.
- Coordinates: 45°1′58″N 90°4′35″W
- Country: United States
- State: Wisconsin
- County: Marathon

Area
  - Total: 2.45 sq mi (6.35 km^{2})
  - Land: 2.45 sq mi (6.35 km^{2})
  - Water: 0 sq mi (0.00 km^{2})
- Elevation: 1,401 ft (427 m)

Population (2020)
  - Total: 1,059
  - Density: 431.9/sq mi (166.77/km^{2})
- Time zone: UTC-6 (Central (CST))
  - Summer (DST): UTC-5 (CDT)
- Zip Code: 54411
- Area codes: 715 & 534
- FIPS code: 55-03550
- GNIS feature ID: 1560994
- Website: athenswis.com

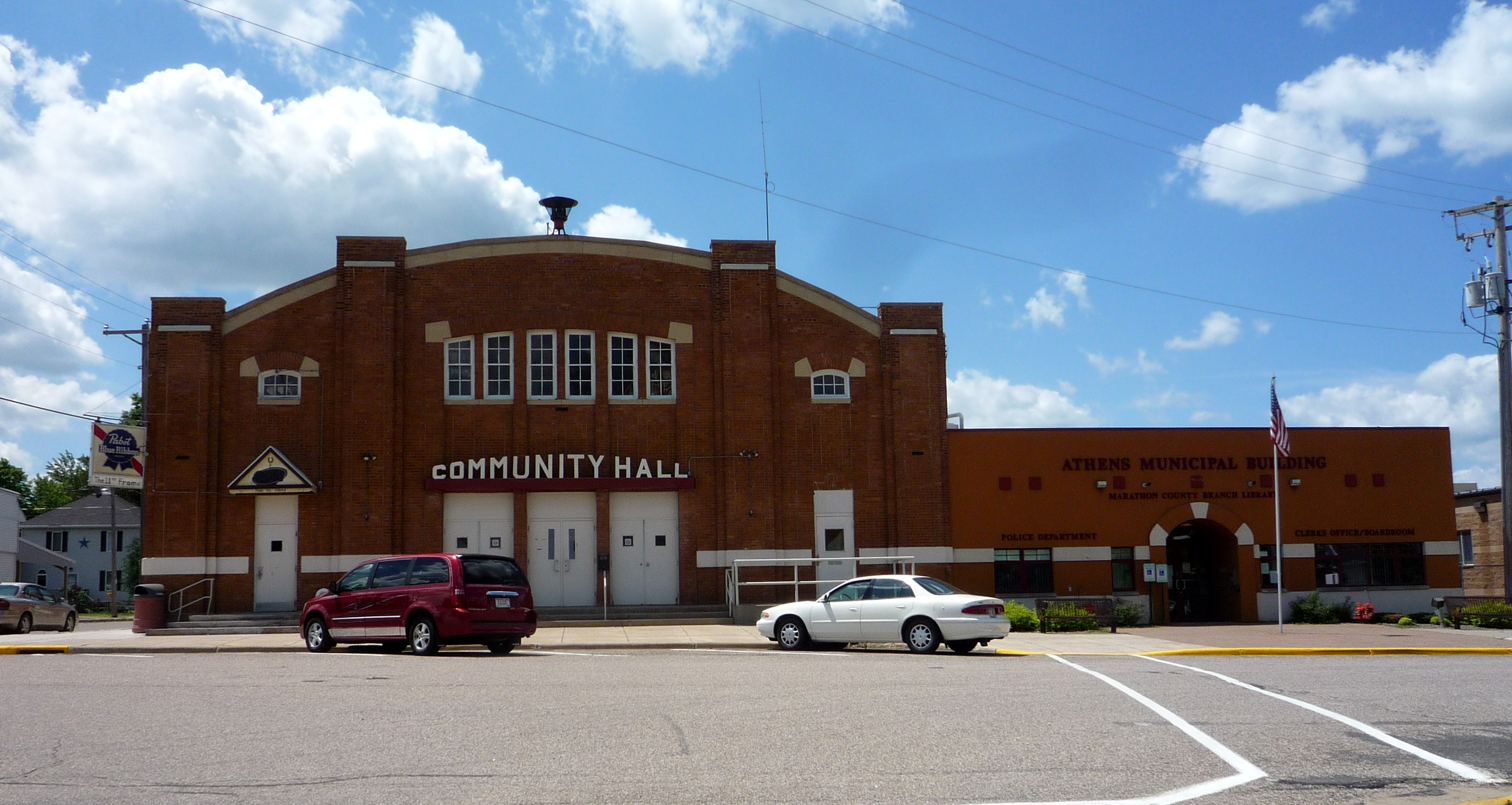
Athens Community Hall, Police Department, Municipal Building and branch of the Marathon County Public Library

Athens is a village in Marathon County, Wisconsin, United States. The population was 1,059 at the 2020 census. It is part of the Wausau, Wisconsin Metropolitan Statistical Area.

== Geography ==
Athens is located at 45°1′58″N 90°4′35″W (45.032641, -90.076442). Athens is almost halfway between the Equator and North Pole, as well as almost halfway between the Prime Meridian and 180th meridian. The Athens area is primarily agricultural with a small industrial park on the southern side of the village limits.

According to the United States Census Bureau, the village has a total area of 2.46 square miles (6.37 km^{2}), all land.

== Demographics ==
Historical population
Census	Pop.	Note	%±
1910	904		—
1920	940		4.0%
1930	936		−0.4%
1940	856		−8.5%
1950	823		−3.9%
1960	770		−6.4%
1970	856		11.2%
1980	988		15.4%
1990	951		−3.7%
2000	1,095		15.1%
2010	1,105		0.9%
2020	1,059		−4.2%
U.S. Decennial Census

=== 2010 census ===
As of the census of 2010, there were 1,105 people, 471 households, and 298 families living in the village. The population density was 449.2 inhabitants per square mile (173.4/km^{2}). There were 503 housing units at an average density of 204.5 per square mile (79.0/km^{2}). The racial makeup of the village was 96.2% White, 0.2% African American, 0.2% Native American, 0.2% Asian, 2.4% from other races, and 0.8% from two or more races. Hispanic or Latino of any race were 4.9% of the population.

There were 471 households, of which 30.1% had children under the age of 18 living with them, 50.7% were married couples living together, 8.1% had a female householder with no husband present, 4.5% had a male householder with no wife present, and 36.7% were non-families. 30.1% of all households were made up of individuals, and 14.4% had someone living alone who was 65 years of age or older. The average household size was 2.35 and the average family size was 2.96.

The median age in the village was 39.5 years. 24.7% of residents were under the age of 18; 7.6% were between the ages of 18 and 24; 25.7% were from 25 to 44; 24.3% were from 45 to 64; and 17.7% were 65 years of age or older. The gender makeup of the village was 51.0% male and 49.0% female.

=== 2000 census ===
At the 2000 census, there were 1,095 people, 443 households and 299 families living in the village. The population density was 448.2 people per square mile (173.3/km^{2}). There were 469 housing units at an average density of 192.0 per square mile (74.2/km^{2}). The racial makeup of the village was 98.72% White, 0.09% Native American, 0.55% from other races, and 0.64% from two or more races. Hispanic or Latino of any race were 2.10% of the population.

There were 443 households, of which 33.4% had children under the age of 18 living with them, 56.9% were married couples living together, 7.0% had a female householder with no husband present, and 32.5% were non-families. 29.1% of all households were made up of individuals, and 16.9% had someone living alone who was 65 years of age or older. The average household size was 2.47 and the average family size was 3.08.

Age distribution was 26.8% under the age of 18, 8.5% from 18 to 24, 27.2% from 25 to 44, 19.3% from 45 to 64, and 18.3% who were 65 years of age or older. The median age was 36 years. For every 100 females, there were 93.8 males. For every 100 females age 18 and over, there were 94.2 males.

The median household income was $39,286, and the median family income was $52,727. Males had a median income of $30,956 versus $22,167 for females. The per capita income for the village was $17,076. About 1.3% of families and 4.5% of the population were below the poverty line, including 0.7% of those under age 18 and 12.1% of those age 65 or over.

== Athens Library ==
The Athens Library is part of the Marathon County Public Library (MCPL) and the Wisconsin Valley Library Service, a regional library system. The library began in the early 1900s as a small collection of books in the Bloczynski Hotel. In 1926, the Athens Women's Club assumed management of the library, moving the collection to the Athens Bank. The library moved again in 1941, to the Community Hall. In 1947, the Athens Library joined the Marathon County Library. In 1973, when the Marathon County Library and Wausau Public Library merged to form the Marathon County Public Library, the Athens Library became a branch of the MCPL.

== Education ==
The Athens School District is made up of three schools: Athens Elementary School, and Athens Middle School, and Athens High School. The middle and high schools share the same building. The Athens School District belongs to the Marawood Conference. Its mascot is the Fighting Bluejay. There are two parochial schools in the community, Trinity Lutheran and St. Anthony de Padua Catholic School, and one charter school, Maple Grove Elementary School.

== Notable people ==
- Russ Decker, Wisconsin politician, was born in Athens.
- Charles Winninger, notable character actor, was born in Athens.
