= Wisconsin Interscholastic Athletic Association =

High school sports governing body

- Abbreviation: WIAA
- Formation: 1896
- Type: Volunteer; NPO
- Legal status: Association
- Purpose: Sports governing body
- Headquarters: 5516 Vern Holmes Dr. Stevens Point, Wisconsin 54481
- Region served: Wisconsin
- Executive Director: Stephanie Hauser
- Affiliations: National Federation of State High School Associations
- Staff: 20
- Website: wiaawi.org

The Wisconsin Interscholastic Athletic Association (WIAA) is the regulatory body for all high school sports in the U.S. state of Wisconsin. Its history dates to 1895, making it the earliest continually existing high school athletic organization in the country. It also provides the licensing program for more than 10,000 officials in the state, and oversees junior high or middle school athletics in about 100 of the state's nearly 400 school districts. Among its duties are the administration of state tournament series in its various sports, overseeing eligibility and conference alignment, and promoting sportsmanship.

== History ==
The WIAA considers its start to be a meeting in December 1896 of part of the state teachers association following a state track and field meet organized by the University of Wisconsin–Madison. Meetings led to the formation of a rules committee, followed by a Board of Control, which is still the WIAA's governing board. It has 11 members, seven chosen by regions, three at-large and a representative from the Wisconsin Association of School Boards. An Advisory Council, made up of 18 members, also provides governance and advice. It is made up of 15 members, five each from large, medium and small schools, a gender at-large representative, a minority at-large representative and a nonpublic school representative.

Until 2000, only public schools were WIAA members; private schools had belonged to the Wisconsin Independent Schools Athletic Association (WISAA). When WISAA announced it would shut down, the WIAA changed its rules to allow private schools. The WIAA, unlike some other state bodies, does not add a multiplier to enrollment of private schools to contend with perceived advantages private schools have in drawing athletes.

The WIAA held its own state track meet in 1897 and its first state boys' basketball tournament in 1920. For boys' sports, it added cross country (1913), golf (1923), tennis (1925), and swimming (1925). In the 1940s, wrestling (1940), volleyball (1948) and baseball (1948) were added; in the 1950s, skiing and curling, and in the 1960s, gymnastics. These sports have been dropped by the WIAA. 1965 also brought a second baseball tournament, this one for summer participants, which was dropped after the 2018 season due to dwindling participation. Ice hockey was added in 1970, Soccer (1982) was added, and volleyball, which had been dropped (in 1982), returned to tournament status in 2000.

Football was a recognized sport but championships were only held briefly in the 1920s. The WIAA resumed playoffs in 1976.

The WIAA started adding girls sports in the 1970s. Swimming (1970) was the first, followed by gymnastics, track, and tennis in 1971, golf (1972), and volleyball (1973). Cross country joined the list in 1975, then basketball and softball (1976). Girls' soccer added a state tournament in 1983. Ice hockey was added in 2002. The most recent is girls' wrestling in 2021.

== Sports offered ==
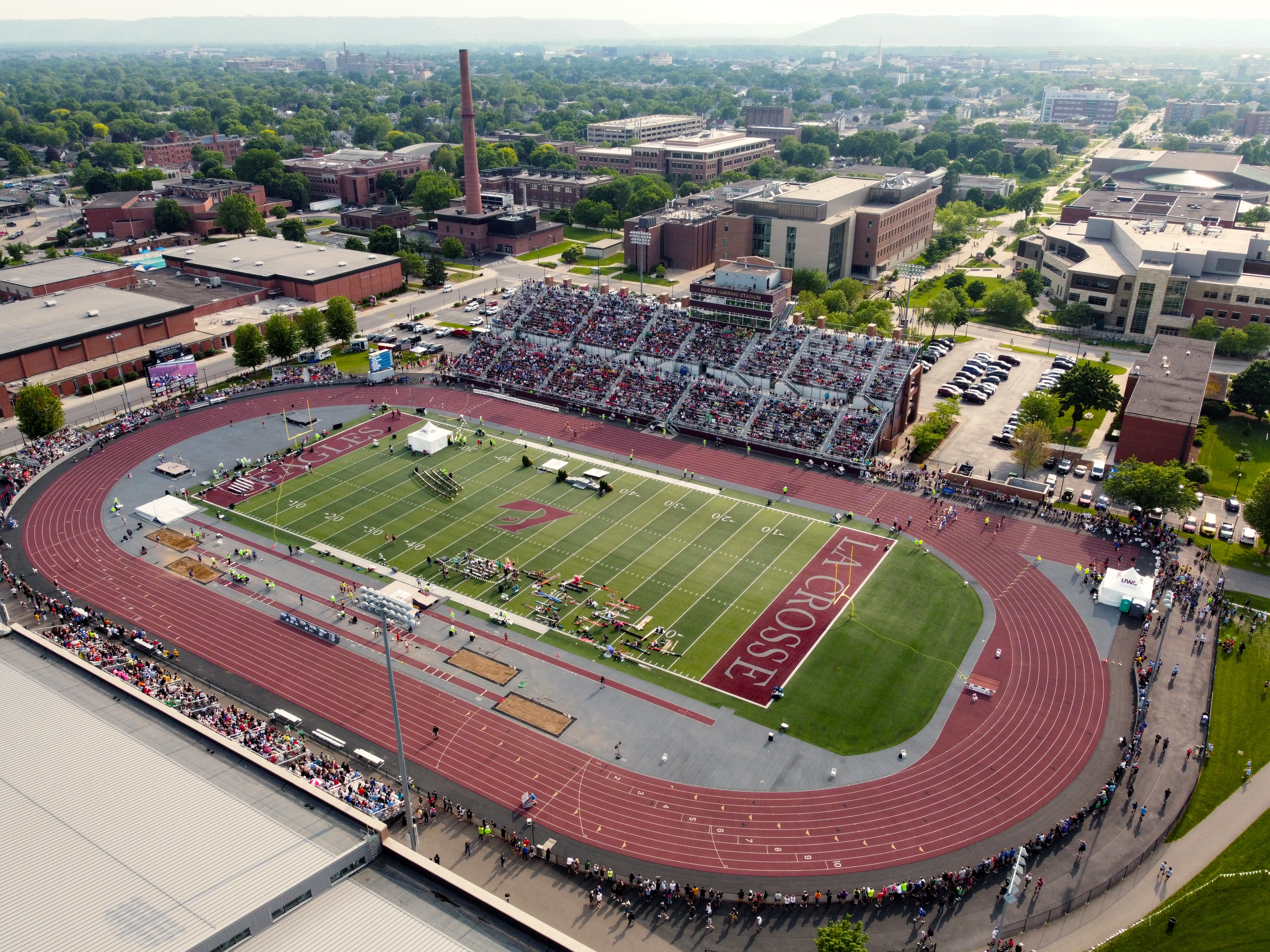
WIAA state track and field meet Veterans Memorial Stadium in La Crosse in 2025

The number of classes - referred to as divisions by the WIAA, and numbered so that 1 includes the largest schools while higher numbers include smaller schools - varies by sport. Except for football, all schools sponsoring a sport are in the tournament. Seeding is used for matchups in several team sports and in individual sports. The tournament structure starts with multi-team regionals, usually at the site of one school, followed by sectionals, usually at a neutral site (unless a team in the regional gets to a sectional it is hosting), and then state.

Sport	First season	Division(s)	Season duration	Championship location	Most recent team champions
Baseball	1948	4	March–June	Fox Cities Stadium (Grand Chute)	2026 champions: Division 1 - Kaukauna; Division 2 - Pewaukee; Division 3 - Cedar Grove; Division 4 - Columbus Catholic
Boys' basketball	1920	5	November–March	Kohl Center (Note: Alliant Energy Center or Wisconsin Field House in Madison in years where the Kohl Center hosts NCAA basketball tournament regionals at the same time.) (Madison)	2026 champions: Division 1 - Wisconsin Lutheran; Division 2 - Whitefish Bay; Division 3 - Racine St. Catherine's; Division 4 - Milwaukee Juneau; Division 5 - Reedsville
Girls' basketball	1976	5	November–March	Resch Center (Ashwaubenon)	2026 champions: Division 1 - Arrowhead; Division 2 - Whitefish Bay; Division 3 - Oostburg; Division 4 - Neillsville; Division 5 - Pacelli
Boys' cross country	1913	3	August–October	The Ridges Golf Course (Wisconsin Rapids)	2026 champions: Division 1 - Stevens Point Area; Division 2 - Campbellsport; Division 3 - Marathon
Girls' cross country	1975	3	August–October	The Ridges Golf Course (Wisconsin Rapids)	2026 champions: Division 1 - Neenah; Division 2 - New Berlin Eisenhower; Division 3 - Southwestern
8-player football	1937; 2012	1	August–October	Lincoln High School (Wisconsin Rapids)	McDonell Central Catholic
11-player football	1976	7	August–October	Camp Randall Stadium (Madison)	2025 champions: Division 1 - Arrowhead; Division 2 - West De Pere; Division 3 - Grafton; Division 4 - Winneconne; Division 5 - Mayville; Division 6 - Darlington; Division 7 - Kenosha St. Joseph Catholic
Boys' golf	1923	3	March–June	University Ridge Golf Course (Madison)	2026 champions: Division 1 - Middleton; Division 2 - Winneconne; Division 3 - Kohler
Girls' golf	1972	2	August–October	University Ridge Golf Course (Madison)	2026 champions: Division 1 - Divine Savior Holy Angels; Division 2 - Edgerton
Gymnastics	1971	2	November–March	Lincoln High School (Wisconsin Rapids)	2026 champions: Division 1 - Arrowhead; Division 2 - Dodgeville
Boys' ice hockey	1970	2	November–March	Bob Suter's LEGACY20 Arena (through 2026, Middleton); Wings Arena (from 2027, DeForest)	2026 champions: Division 1 - Edgewood; Division 2 - Northland Pines
Girls' ice hockey	2002	1	November–March	Bob Suter's LEGACY20 Arena (through 2026, Middleton); Wings Arena (from 2027, DeForest)	De Pere co-op
Boys' lacrosse	2024	1	March–June	Bank of Sun Prairie Stadium (Sun Prairie)	Hudson
Girls' lacrosse	2024	1	March–June	Bank of Sun Prairie Stadium (Sun Prairie)	Hudson
Boys' soccer	1982	4	August–November	Uihlein Soccer Park (Milwaukee)	2026 champions: Division 1 - Marquette University; Division 2 - Whitefish Bay; Division 3 - St. Thomas More; Division 4 - Cristo Ray Jesuit
Girls' soccer	1983	4	March–June	Uihlein Soccer Park (Milwaukee)	2026 champions: Division 1 - Divine Savior Holy Angels; Division 2 - Brookfield Central; Division 3 - McFarland; Division 4 - The Prairie School
Softball	1976	5	March–June	Goodman Diamond (Madison)	2026 champions: Division 1 - Hamilton; Division 2 - Fox Valley Lutheran; Division 3 - Lomira; Division 4 - Mineral Point; Division 5 - Almond-Bancroft
Boys' swim and dive	1925	2	November–February	Waukesha South High School (Waukesha)	2026 champions: Division 1 - Middleton; Division 2 - Whitefish Bay
Girls' swim and dive	1970	2	August–November	Waukesha South High School (Waukesha)	2025 champions: Division 1 - Middleton; Division 2 - Whitefish Bay
Boys' tennis	1925	2	March–June	Nielsen Stadium (Madison)	2026 champions: Division 1 - Whitefish Bay; Division 2 - Altoona
Girls' tennis	1971	2	August–October	Nielsen Stadium (Madison)	2026 champions: Division 1 - Brookfield East; Division 2 - Brookfield Academy
Boys' track and field	1897	3	March–June	Veterans Memorial Stadium (La Crosse)	2026 champions: Division 1 - Homestead; Division 2 - Winneconne; Division 3 - Marathon; Wheelchair - Marquette University
Girls' track and field	1971	3	March–June	Veterans Memorial Stadium (La Crosse)	2026 champions: Division 1 - Arrowhead; Division 2 - Bloomer; Division 3 - Ladysmith; Wheelchair - Sun Prairie East
Boys' volleyball	1948; 2000	1	August–November	Resch Center (Ashwaubenon)	Middleton
Girls' volleyball	1973	5	August–November	Resch Center (Ashwaubenon)	2026 champions: Division 1 - Divine Savior Holy Angels; Division 2 - Xavier; Division 3 - Watertown Luther Prep; Division 4 - McDonell Catholic; Division 5 - Central Wisconsin Christian
Boys' wrestling	1940	3	November–March	Kohl Center (individual, Madison); La Crosse Center (team, La Crosse)	2026 champions: Division 1 - Kaukauna; Division 2 - Evansville; Division 3 - Aquinas
Girls' wrestling	2021	1	November–March	Kohl Center (individual, Madison); La Crosse Center (team, La Crosse)	First team championship in 2027

== Conferences ==
The WIAA added overseeing of athletic conferences to its duties in the 1980s after several disputes. Previously, schools had banded together on their own. The WIAA's role is to keep conferences consisting of similar-sized schools within a reasonable distance of each other. Except for football, conference championships do not have any effect on a team's tournament seeding.

== Cooperative teams ==
In 1982, the WIAA approved cooperative teams, allowing two or more schools to combine to form a team in a sport where neither school has enough athletes to run the sport on its own. The schools are generally referred to by a hyphenated version of their school names, although some choose a unique team nickname and mascot. The schools involved must be in the same geographical area and combine for at least two years, although the WIAA may approve an early release. In addition, the conference the combined team will compete in must approve. The total enrollment of the two schools determines which tournament division the team plays in.

The rule has allowed smaller schools to combine for sports such as football and track which require larger numbers, and larger schools to combine for sports with low interest.
