= Mississippi Valley Triangular League =

Wisconsin high school athletic conference (1936-1940)

The Mississippi Valley Triangular League is a former high school athletic conference in Wisconsin. Comprising three schools in west central Wisconsin, it was in existence from 1936 to 1940 and its member schools were affiliated with the Wisconsin Interscholastic Athletic Association.

== History ==
Location of Mississippi Valley Triangular League Members

The Mississippi Valley Triangular League was formed as a basketball-only conference in 1936 by three schools that left the Little Eight Conference in 1935: Augusta, Black River Falls and Neillsville. Competition lasted for four years before the conference stopped keeping records in 1940, however the conference members continued to schedule each other on an annual basis until the late 1950s.

== Conference membership history ==
School	Location	Affiliation	Mascot	Colors	Joined	Left	Conference Joined	Current Conference
Augusta	Augusta, WI	Public	Beavers		1936	1940	Mississippi Valley	Dairyland
Black River Falls	Black River Falls, WI	Public	Tigers		1936	1940	Mississippi Valley	Coulee
Neillsville	Neillsville, WI	Public	Warriors		1936	1940	Independent	Cloverbelt

== List of conference champions ==
=== Boys Basketball ===
School	Quantity	Years
Augusta	3	1937, 1938, 1939
Neillsville	3	1937, 1939, 1940
Black River Falls	1	1940
