= Mississippi Valley Conference (Wisconsin, 1933-1965) =

Wisconsin high school athletic conference (1933-1965)

The Mississippi Valley Conference (MVC) is a former high school athletic conference with its catchment in west central Wisconsin. Formed in 1933 and disbanded in 1965, it is the first of two athletic conferences in Wisconsin to carry this name, and all members were affiliated with the Wisconsin Interscholastic Athletic Association.

== History ==
Location of Mississippi Valley Conference Members (1938–1959)

The Mississippi Valley Conference was founded in 1933 and contained five smaller high schools in western Wisconsin: Alma, Arcadia, Durand, Mondovi and Osseo. Augusta joined from the Little Eight Conference in 1935, replacing Alma after their return to the Bi-County Conference. Whitehall followed in 1936 while maintaining dual membership in the Trempeleau Valley Conference (which they left in 1938). Black River Falls became the conference's seventh member school when it joined in 1938. These seven schools competed together for two decades before three left to become charter members of the new Dairyland Conference in 1959: Augusta, Osseo and Whitehall. Chippewa Falls and Cochrane-Fountain City took their place that same year. Menomonie was also accepted into the conference for 1959 but withdrew before ever playing a game. Three schools exited the conference in 1963: Black River Falls for the South Central Conference, Chippewa Falls for the Big Rivers Conference and Cochrane-Fountain City for the Dairyland Conference. For the last two years of its existence, the Mississippi Valley Conference competed as a three-school circuit until Arcadia left for the Coulee Conference in 1965, thus ending the conference's run. The MVC name was revived in 1989 for a new athletic conference of large high schools located in the La Crosse-Onalaska-Sparta combined statistical area.

== Conference membership history ==
=== Final members ===
School	Location	Affiliation	Mascot	Colors	Joined	Left	Conference Joined	Current Conference
Arcadia	Arcadia, WI	Public	Raiders		1933	1965	Coulee	
Durand	Durand, WI	Public	Panthers		1933	1965	Independent	Dunn-St. Croix
Mondovi	Mondovi, WI	Public	Buffaloes		1933	1965	Independent	Dunn-St. Croix

=== Previous members ===
School	Location	Affiliation	Mascot	Colors	Joined	Left	Conference Joined	Current Conference
Alma	Alma, WI	Public	Rivermen		1933	1935	Bi-County	Dairyland
Augusta	Augusta, WI	Public	Beavers		1935	1959	Dairyland	
Black River Falls	Black River Falls, WI	Public	Tigers		1938	1963	South Central	Coulee
Chippewa Falls	Chippewa Falls, WI	Public	Cardinals		1959	1963	Big Rivers	
Cochrane-Fountain City	Fountain City, WI	Public	Pirates		1959	1963	Dairyland	
Osseo	Osseo, WI	Public	Chieftains		1933	1959	Dairyland	Cloverbelt
Whitehall	Whitehall, WI	Public	Norse		1936	1959	Dairyland	

=== Football-only members ===
School	Location	Affiliation	Mascot	Colors	Seasons	Primary Conference
Galesville	Galesville, WI	Public	Galloping Gales		1946-1948	Coulee
Gale-Ettrick	Galesville, WI	Public	Redmen		1949-1958	Coulee

== List of conference champions ==
=== Boys Basketball ===
School	Quantity	Years
Arcadia	7	1938, 1939, 1940, 1948, 1949, 1951, 1958
Augusta	7	1936, 1944, 1945, 1947, 1948, 1950, 1952
Durand	7	1934, 1937, 1941, 1946, 1959, 1962, 1965
Black River Falls	4	1953, 1954, 1955, 1961
Mondovi	3	1956, 1957, 1964
Osseo	3	1935, 1950, 1952
Chippewa Falls	2	1960, 1963
Whitehall	1	1942
Alma	0	
Cochrane-Fountain City	0	

=== Football ===
School	Quantity	Years
Arcadia	12	1939, 1941, 1942, 1944, 1949, 1950, 1951, 1955, 1956, 1957, 1958, 1959
Mondovi	9	1943, 1948, 1949, 1952, 1960, 1961, 1962, 1963, 1964
Black River Falls	7	1940, 1952, 1953, 1954, 1959, 1960, 1961
Durand	3	1945, 1947, 1963
Chippewa Falls	1	1959
Osseo	1	1954
Whitehall	1	1946
Augusta	0	
Cochrane-Fountain City	0	
Gale-Ettrick	0	
Galesville	0	
