= Mississippi Valley Conference (Wisconsin, 1989–present) =

Wisconsin high school athletic conference

- Conference: WIAA
- Founded: 1989
- Sports fielded: 19; men's: 10; women's: 9
- Division: Division 1
- No. of teams: 7
- Headquarters: La Crosse, Wisconsin
- Region: La Crosse Metropolitan
- Website: www.mvconference.org

The Mississippi Valley Conference (MVC) is a high school athletic conference in southwest Wisconsin. Founded in 1989, the conference and its member schools belong to the Wisconsin Interscholastic Athletic Association and are located in the La Crosse-Onalaska-Sparta combined statistical area.

== History ==
The Mississippi Valley Conference was formed in 1989 to accommodate for the growing attendance in schools in traditional rural-based conferences and shorten travel distances for its members. Holmen and Onalaska joined from the Coulee Conference, Sparta and Tomah from the South Central Conference, and La Crosse Central High School and Logan High School from the Big Rivers Conference. Shortly after, in 1997, Aquinas High School joined from the Central Wisconsin Catholic Conference of the Wisconsin Independent Schools Athletic Association, a private school athletic league, to become the conference's seventh member. It is the second high school athletic conference in Wisconsin to carry this name, the previous incarnation was based in west central Wisconsin and was in existence from 1933 to 1965.

In 2014, West Salem began competition in the Mississippi Valley Conference for football only, remaining in the Coulee Conference for all other sports. Aquinas left the MVC's football roster in 2019 when they joined the Southwest Wisconsin Activities League as associate members for that sport. The next year, a comprehensive realignment of Wisconsin high school football conferences was implemented by the WIAA with input from the Wisconsin Football Coaches Association to run on a two-year cycle. All six of the MVC's public high schools (Central, Holmen, Logan, Onalaska, Sparta and Tomah) remained in the conference with associate members River Falls (Big Rivers) and West Salem (Coulee) filling out the ranks. River Falls and West Salem returned to their respective conferences for the 2022-2023 realignment cycle with two schools from the Badger Conference (Baraboo and Reedsburg) replacing them. This alignment will stay in effect through at least the 2026-2027 competition cycle.

== Sports sponsored ==
The MVC sponsors 19 varsity sports. They are:

- Fall: Football, boys' soccer, girls' tennis, volleyball, boys' cross country, girls' cross country and girls' golf
- Winter: Boys' basketball, girls' basketball, gymnastics, wrestling boys' hockey.
- Spring: Boys' track, girls' track, boys' golf, boys' tennis, girls' soccer, baseball and softball.

== List of member schools ==
=== Current members ===
School	Location	Affiliation	Enrollment	Mascot	Colors	Year Joined
Aquinas	La Crosse, WI	Private (Catholic)	330	Blugolds		1997
Holmen	Holmen, WI	Public	1,195	Vikings		1989
La Crosse Central	La Crosse, WI	Public	964	Riverhawks		1989
La Crosse Logan	La Crosse, WI	Public	720	Rangers		1989
Onalaska	Onalaska, WI	Public	916	Hilltoppers		1989
Sparta	Sparta, WI	Public	904	Spartans		1989
Tomah	Tomah, WI	Public	922	Timberwolves		1989

=== Current associate members ===
School	Location	Affiliation	Mascot	Colors	Primary Conference	Sport(s)
Arcadia	Arcadia, WI	Public	Raiders		Coulee	Boys Soccer, Girls Soccer (Note: Co-operative with Independence)
Baraboo	Baraboo, WI	Public	Thunderbirds		Badger	Football
Reedsburg	Reedsburg, WI	Public	Beavers		Badger	Football
West Salem	West Salem, WI	Public	Panthers		Coulee	Boys Soccer, Girls Soccer

=== Former associate members ===
School	Location	Affiliation	Mascot	Colors	Joined	Left	Primary Conference	Sport(s)
River Falls	River Falls, WI	Public	Wildcats		2020	2021	Big Rivers	Football
West Salem	West Salem, WI	Public	Panthers		2020	2021	Coulee	Football

=== Former co-operative members ===
Program	Location	Nickname	Colors	Host School	Co-operative Members	Joined	Left
Avalanche Hockey	La Crosse, WI	Avalanche		Aquinas	Cochrane-Fountain City, Gale-Ettrick-Trempealeau, Holmen, Luther	2010	2025
La Crosse	La Crosse, WI	Red Rangers		La Crosse Central	La Crosse Logan	2010	2018

== Membership map ==
Mississippi Valley Conference
Location of Mississippi Valley Conference full members:
1 Aquinas
2 Holmen
3 La Crosse Central
4 La Crosse Logan
5 Onalaska
6 Sparta
7 Tomah

== Sponsored sports ==
	Baseball	Boys Basketball	Girls Basketball	Boys Cross Country	Girls Cross Country	Football	Boys Golf	Girls Golf	Gymnastics	Boys Soccer	Girls Soccer	Softball	Boys Tennis	Girls Tennis	Boys Track & Field	Girls Track & Field	Girls Volleyball	Boys Wrestling	Girls Wrestling
Aquinas	●	●	●	●	●		●	●		●	●	●	●	●	●	●	●	●	●
Holmen	●	●	●	●	●	●	●	●	●	●	●	●	●	●	●	●	●	●	●
La Crosse Central	●	●	●	●	●	●	● (Note: Co-operative with La Crosse Logan)	●	●	●	●	●	●	●	●	●	●		
La Crosse Logan	●	●	●	●	●	●				●	● (Note: Co-operative with Luther)	●	●	●	●	●	●	● (Note: Co-operative with La Crosse Central)	●
Onalaska	●	●	●	●	●	●	●	●	●	●	●	●	●	●	●	●	●	●	●
Sparta	●	●	●	●	●	●	●	●	●	●	●	●	●	●	●	●	●	●	●
Tomah	●	●	●	●	●	●	●	●	●	●	●	●	●	●	●	●	●	●	●

== List of state champions ==
=== Fall sports ===
Boys Cross Country
School	Year	Division
La Crosse Central	1990	Division 1
Aquinas	2007	Division 3
Aquinas	2018	Division 3
Aquinas	2019	Division 3
Aquinas	2020	Division 2
Onalaska	2021	Division 1

Girls Cross Country
School	Year	Division
La Crosse Central	1989	Division 1
La Crosse Central	1990	Division 1

Football
School	Year	Division
Aquinas	2007	Division 5

Girls Golf
School	Year	Division
Onalaska	1989	Single Division
La Crosse Central	1990	Single Division
La Crosse Central	1991	Single Division
La Crosse Central	1992	Single Division
La Crosse Central	1993	Single Division
La Crosse Central	1998	Single Division
Aquinas	2017	Division 2

=== Winter sports ===
Boys Basketball
School	Year	Division
Onalaska	1992	Division 2
Aquinas	2003	Division 3
Aquinas	2008	Division 3
Aquinas	2011	Division 3
Onalaska	2012	Division 2
Aquinas	2013	Division 3
La Crosse Central	2017	Division 2
Aquinas	2025	Division 4

Girls Basketball
School	Year	Division
Holmen	1995	Division 2
Aquinas	2018	Division 4
Aquinas	2019	Division 4

Gymnastics
School	Year	Division
Onalaska	1997	Division 2
Onalaska	1998	Division 2
Holmen	2005	Division 2
Holmen	2006	Division 2

Boys Wrestling
School	Year	Division
Aquinas	1999	WISAA (Single Division)
Aquinas	2026	Division 3

=== Spring sports ===
Baseball
School	Year	Division
La Crosse Logan	2001	Division 1
Aquinas	2007	Division 3
Aquinas	2017	Division 3
Aquinas	2024	Division 3

Girls Soccer
School	Year	Division
Aquinas	2015	Division 4

Softball
School	Year	Division
Holmen	1999	Division 1
La Crosse Logan	2015	Division 2

Boys Track & Field
School	Year	Division
Aquinas	2011	Division 2
Aquinas	2019	Division 3
Aquinas	2021	Division 3

Girls Track & Field
School	Year	Division
Aquinas	2012	Division 2
Aquinas	2019	Division 3

=== Summer Sports ===
Baseball
School	Year	Division
Holmen	1990	Single Division

== List of conference champions ==
=== Boys Basketball ===
School	Quantity	Years
La Crosse Central	10	1997, 1998, 2014, 2016, 2017, 2018, 2019, 2021, 2022, 2023
Holmen	9	1991, 1992, 1993, 2001, 2002, 2004, 2005, 2015, 2025
Onalaska	9	1996, 2010, 2012, 2013, 2020, 2022, 2023, 2024, 2026
Aquinas	8	2001, 2003, 2004, 2006, 2007, 2009, 2011, 2025
La Crosse Logan	7	1990, 1994, 1995, 1998, 1999, 2000, 2008
Tomah	1	2005
Sparta	0	

=== Girls Basketball ===
School	Quantity	Years
Aquinas	14	1999, 2001, 2015, 2016, 2017, 2018, 2019, 2020, 2021, 2022, 2023, 2024, 2025, 2026
La Crosse Logan	14	1991, 1992, 1993, 1997, 2000, 2002, 2003, 2006, 2007, 2008, 2009, 2010, 2011, 2012
Holmen	5	1996, 1997, 1998, 2004, 2005
La Crosse Central	5	1990, 1993, 1994, 1995, 1996
Onalaska	3	2013, 2014, 2021
Sparta	1	2006
Tomah	1	1992

=== Football ===
School	Quantity	Years
La Crosse Central	12	1989, 1990, 1991, 1992, 1993, 1998, 2001, 2009, 2012, 2023, 2024, 2025
Onalaska	11	1996, 1997, 2004, 2006, 2016, 2017, 2019, 2020, 2022, 2023, 2024
La Crosse Logan	10	1994, 2000, 2005, 2008, 2009, 2010, 2014, 2015, 2024, 2026
Holmen	9	1992, 2002, 2003, 2013, 2015, 2017, 2018, 2024, 2025
Tomah	5	1995, 1999, 2002, 2007, 2011
Aquinas	2	1997, 2008
Reedsburg	1	2024
River Falls	1	2021
West Salem	1	2017
Baraboo	0	
Sparta	0	

=== Boys Hockey ===
School	Quantity	Years
Onalaska	8	2011, 2012, 2013, 2014, 2015, 2016, 2017, 2018
Avalanche Hockey	5	2013, 2018, 2023, 2024, 2025
Onalaska/ La Crosse	4	2019, 2020, 2022, 2025
Tomah/ Sparta	2	2021, 2025
La Crosse	0	
Sparta	0	
Tomah	0	

== Rivalries ==
The Mississippi Valley Conference has a number of intense rivalries, both based on proximity, and performance.

=== City ===
- Central Vs. Logan - The two La Crosse public schools' intense rivalry is well publicized by local media and is highlighted by football's Battle for the Ark of Victory.
- Central Vs. Aquinas - A heated battle for city supremacy and the overall city championship.
- Logan Vs. Aquinas - A heated battle for city supremacy and the overall city championship.

=== Other main rivalries ===
- Holmen Vs. Onalaska - Proximity spices up this rivalry, as the two school districts overlap city boundaries. Both schools also came over from the Coulee Conference together.
- Tomah Vs. Sparta - Both came over from the South Central Conference and are separated by 17 miles of Interstate 90. The closest conference foe for both teams.
- Reedsburg Vs. Baraboo - Both moved to the MVC as affiliated members and have one of the longest rivalries in the state.

In addition to these main rivalries, many other rivalries have developed based on different sports and success. In the early 2000s, Holmen and Aquinas had fierce competitions in Boys' Basketball in which tickets were sold out days after going on sale. Additionally, in the early 1990s, Onalaska Vs. Central was a heated matchup in Boys' Basketball. That rivalry was rekindled in the 2010s as both teams regularly competed for state bids. In wrestling, Holmen Vs. Sparta and Holmen Vs. Tomah have come and gone. In Boys' Ice Hockey, Onalaska and Aquinas/Holmen/G-E-T/C-FC hold a battle for the Omni Center rivalry, as both teams play in the same venue.

Many non-conference rivalries are also in the MVC. Onalaska Vs. West Salem, Logan and Central Vs. Eau Claire Memorial and North, Tomah Vs. Black River Falls, and Holmen Vs. G-E-T are all annual football games. Aquinas maintains matchups with old conference members from their WISAA days.

=== Rivalry Week ===
In many different sports, particularly but not limited to football, basketball, and wrestling, the three big rivalries will frequently be played on the same days, coining the phrase Rivalry Week in football and Rivalry Night in other sports. These rivalries are Central Vs. Logan, Holmen Vs. Onalaska, and Sparta Vs. Tomah. Occasionally, Aquinas will be inserted into a city match up or against Holmen or Onalaska on a Rivalry Night.
