= Dairyland Conference =

Wisconsin high school athletic conference

The Dairyland Conference is a high school athletic conference in west central Wisconsin. It was founded in 1959 and all member schools are affiliated with the Wisconsin Interscholastic Athletic Association.

== History ==
=== 1959–1977 ===
Location of Original Dairyland Conference Members

The Dairyland Conference was formed by six small high schools in west central Wisconsin in 1959. Three members came from the original Mississippi Valley Conference (Augusta, Osseo and Whitehall) and the other three from the disbanded Trempealeau Valley Conference (Blair, Eleva-Strum and Independence). The membership roster soon increased to eight schools, with Lincoln High School in Alma Center joining from the West Central Conference in 1961 and Cochrane-Fountain City moving over from the Mississippi Valley Conference in 1963. Alma High School joined the Dairyland Conference in 1971 from the West Central Conference. They replaced Cochrane-Fountain City, who was moved to the Coulee Conference that year.

=== 1977–2000 ===
In 1977, the Dairyland Conference added four schools: two from the Coulee Conference (Cochrane-Fountain City and Melrose-Mindoro) and two from the defunct West Central Conference (Gilmanton and Taylor). The membership roster would remain the same for eight years, until the league realigned into divisions based on enrollment size in 1985:

Large Schools	Small Schools
Augusta	Alma
Cochrane-Fountain City	Alma Center Lincoln
Eleva-Strum	Blair
Melrose-Mindoro	Gilmanton
Osseo-Fairchild	Independence
Whitehall	Taylor

Osseo-Fairchild left for membership in the Cloverbelt Conference after the first season of this alignment. In 1989, Blair and Taylor merged to form Blair-Taylor High School, inheriting both predecessors' Dairyland membership in the process. The Dairyland Conference also consolidated into a single division that year. Augusta's departure to the Cloverbelt Conference in 1990 would bring membership down to nine schools. Luther High School in Onalaska entered the Dairyland Conference in 1991, bringing the roster back up to ten schools. The next year, the conference reinstated the Large School/Small School divisional alignment:

Large Schools	Small Schools
Blair-Taylor	Alma
Cochrane-Fountain City	Alma Center Lincoln
Luther	Eleva-Strum
Melrose-Mindoro	Gilmanton
Whitehall	Independence

Luther was voted out of the conference in 1996, with members citing issues with travel distances and competition level disparity. Soon after Luther left the conference in 1997, they were invited to become members of the Coulee Conference.

=== 2000–present ===
Immanuel Lutheran High School in Eau Claire joined the Dairyland Conference as its tenth member in 2000, after the merger between the WIAA and the Wisconsin Independent Schools Athletic Association was completed. Eleva-Strum moved over to the Large Schools division to even out the divisional balance at five members each:

Large Schools	Small Schools
Blair-Taylor	Alma
Cochrane-Fountain City	Alma Center Lincoln
Eleva-Strum	Gilmanton
Melrose-Mindoro	Immanuel Lutheran
Whitehall	Independence

In 2006, Alma Center Lincoln and Eleva-Strum swapped divisions, and in 2009, Alma High School entered into a cooperative agreement for most sports with nearby Pepin High School. The Pepin/Alma cooperative inherited Alma's place in the Dairyland Conference's Small Schools division. Augusta reentered the Dairyland in 2014 and was added to the conference's Large Schools division. Blair-Taylor and Eleva-Strum switched divisions in 2016, with the latter making their return to the Large Schools division. Blair-Taylor returned to the Large Schools division in 2021, with Alma Center Lincoln moving back to the Small Schools division. Two years later, Independence and Gilmanton became a cooperative program and remained in the Small Schools division. Cochrane-Fountain City moved over to the Small Schools division to balance the alignment at five schools per division:

Large Schools	Small Schools
Augusta	Alma Center Lincoln
Blair-Taylor	Cochrane-Fountain City
Eleva-Strum	Immanuel Lutheran
Melrose-Mindoro	Independence/Gilmanton
Whitehall	Pepin/Alma

In 2024, Osseo-Fairchild left the Cloverbelt Conference to rejoin the Dairyland, and they were placed in the Large Schools division.

== List of conference members ==
=== Current full members ===
School	Location	Affiliation	Enrollment	Mascot	Colors	Joined	Division
Alma/Pepin	Alma, WI	Public	162	Eagles		2009	Small
Alma Center Lincoln	Alma Center, WI	Public	164	Hornets		1961	Small
Augusta (Note: Left the Dairyland Conference in 1990, returned in 2014)	Augusta, WI	Public	186	Beavers		1959, 2014	Large
Blair-Taylor	Blair, WI	Public	166	Wildcats		1989	Large
Cochrane-Fountain City (Note: Left the Dairyland Conference in 1971, returned in 1977)	Fountain City, WI	Public	161	Pirates		1963, 1977	Small
Eleva-Strum	Strum, WI	Public	193	Cardinals		1959	Large
Immanuel Lutheran	Eau Claire, WI	Private (Lutheran, CLC)	110	Lancers		2000	Small
Independence/ Gilmanton	Independence, WI	Public	170	Indees		2023	Small
Melrose-Mindoro	Melrose, WI	Public	199	Mustangs		1977	Large
Osseo-Fairchild (Note: Left the Dairyland Conference in 1986, returned in 2024)	Osseo, WI	Public	205	Thunder		1959, 2024	Large
Whitehall	Whitehall, WI	Public	214	Norse		1959	Large

=== Former full members ===
School	Location	Affiliation	Mascot	Colors	Joined	Left	Conference Joined	Current Conference
Alma	Alma, WI	Public	Rivermen		1971	2009	Dairyland (coop with Pepin)	
Blair	Blair, WI	Public	Cardinals		1959	1989	Closed (merged into Blair-Taylor)	
Gilmanton	Gilmanton, WI	Public	Panthers		1977	2023	Dairyland (coop with Independence)	
Independence	Independence, WI	Public	Indees		1959	2023	Dairlyland (coop with Gilmanton)	
Luther	Onalaska, WI	Private (Lutheran, WELS)	Knights		1991	1997	Coulee	
Taylor	Taylor, WI	Public	Trojans		1977	1989	Closed (merged into Blair-Taylor)	

=== Former football-only members ===
School	Location	Affiliation	Mascot	Colors	Seasons	Primary Conference
Augusta	Augusta, WI	Public	Beavers		2011-2013	Cloverbelt

== Membership timeline ==
=== Full members ===
Eastern Division Western Division Large Schools Small Schools

== Membership map ==
Dairyland Conference
Location of Dairyland Conference full members:
1 Alma
2 Alma Center Lincoln
3 Augusta
4 Blair-Taylor
5 Cochrane-Fountain City
6 Eleva-Strum
7 Gilmanton
8 Immanuel Lutheran
9 Independence
10 Melrose-Mindoro
11 Osseo-Fairchild
12 Pepin
13 Whitehall

== Sponsored sports ==
	Baseball	Boys Basketball	Girls Basketball	Boys Cross Country	Girls Cross Country	Football	Boys Golf	Softball	Boys Track & Field	Girls Track & Field	Girls Volleyball	Boys Wrestling	Girls Wrestling
Alma/Pepin	● (Note: Hosted by Pepin)	● (Note: Hosted by Alma)	●			●	●	●	●	●	●		
Alma Center Lincoln	●	●	●	●	●			●	●	●	●		
Augusta	●	●	●	●	●	●	●	●	●	●	●		
Blair-Taylor	●	●	●	●	●	●	●	●	●	●	●	●	●
Cochrane-Fountain City	●	●	●	●	●	●	●	●	●	●	●	●	●
Eleva-Strum	●	●	●	●	●	●	●	●	●	●	●		
Immanuel Lutheran	●	●	●	●	●			●	●	●	●		
Independence/Gilmanton	● (Note: Hosted by Independence)	● (Note: Hosted by Gilmanton)	●	●	●	●	●	●	●	●	●	●	●
Melrose-Mindoro	●	●	●	●	●	●		●	●	●	●		
Osseo-Fairchild	●	●	●	●	●		●	●	●	●	●	● (Note: Co-operative with Augusta and Fall Creek)	●
Whitehall	●	●	●	●	●	●	●	●	●	●	●	●	●

== List of state champions ==
=== Fall sports ===
Boys Cross Country
School	Year	Division
Cochrane-Fountain City	1984	Class C
Cochrane-Fountain City	1993	Division 3
Cochrane-Fountain City	1994	Division 3
Cochrane-Fountain City	1995	Division 3
Cochrane-Fountain City	1996	Division 3

Girls Cross Country
School	Year	Division
Cochrane-Fountain City	1996	Division 3
Cochrane-Fountain City	1998	Division 3
Cochrane-Fountain City	1999	Division 3
Cochrane-Fountain City	2022	Division 3

Football
School	Year	Division
Osseo-Fairchild	1977	Division 4
Osseo-Fairchild	1981	Division 5
Osseo-Fairchild	1982	Division 5
Augusta	1989	Division 6
Eleva-Strum	2007	Division 7

Girls Volleyball
School	Year	Division
Immanuel Lutheran	2024	Division 5

=== Winter sports ===
Boys Basketball
School	Year	Division
Eleva-Strum	2008	Division 4
Cochrane-Fountain City	2025	Division 5

Girls Basketball
School	Year	Division
Gilmanton	2001	Division 4

=== Spring sports ===
Baseball
School	Year	Division
Eleva-Strum	2024	Division 4

Boys Golf
School	Year	Division
Eleva-Strum	1989	Class C
Eleva-Strum	2008	Division 3

Boys Track & Field
School	Year	Division
Whitehall	1986	Class C

Girls Track & Field
School	Year	Division
Whitehall	2008	Division 3

=== Summer sports ===
Baseball
School	Year	Division
Whitehall	1986	Single Division

== List of conference champions ==
=== Boys Basketball ===
School	Quantity	Years
Eleva-Strum	23	1961, 1962, 1965, 1966, 1982, 1989, 1990, 1991, 1992, 1993, 1997, 1999, 2000, 2001, 2002, 2003, 2006, 2007, 2008, 2009, 2012, 2014, 2015
Whitehall	20	1961, 1967, 1968, 1969, 1970, 1979, 1980, 1984, 1985, 1987, 1988, 1999, 2000, 2007, 2008, 2010, 2013, 2020, 2022, 2026
Blair-Taylor	15	1992, 1993, 1994, 1995, 1997, 1998, 2004, 2005, 2009, 2010, 2011, 2014, 2019, 2020, 2021
Alma Center Lincoln	8	1963, 1967, 1998, 2002, 2003, 2005, 2006, 2020
Osseo-Fairchild	8	1970, 1971, 1976, 1977, 1978, 1981, 1983, 2025
Cochrane-Fountain City	7	1987, 2010, 2013, 2017, 2024, 2025, 2026
Melrose-Mindoro	7	1998, 2015, 2016, 2018, 2019, 2023, 2024
Blair	6	1960, 1963, 1964, 1972, 1973, 1974
Gilmanton	6	1994, 1995, 1998, 2001, 2011, 2012
Alma	4	1975, 1989, 1990, 1996
Independence	4	1987, 1988, 1999, 2018
Alma/ Pepin	4	2010, 2016, 2017, 2023
Immanuel Lutheran	3	2004, 2021, 2022
Luther	2	1995, 1996
Augusta	1	1986
Independence/ Gilmanton	0	
Taylor	0	

=== Girls Basketball ===
School	Quantity	Years
Blair-Taylor	17	1993, 1994, 1995, 1996, 1998, 1999, 2005, 2006, 2012, 2017, 2018, 2020, 2021, 2022, 2023, 2025, 2026
Independence	15	1987, 1992, 1993, 1994, 1996, 1998, 2004, 2007, 2008, 2009, 2010, 2011, 2015, 2016, 2019
Eleva-Strum	13	1989, 1995, 1997, 2001, 2004, 2008, 2010, 2011, 2012, 2013, 2014, 2025, 2026
Alma Center Lincoln	12	1979, 1980, 1981, 1988, 1989, 1990, 1999, 2000, 2001, 2021, 2022, 2023
Cochrane-Fountain City	10	1987, 1988, 1989, 1990, 1992, 1997, 2015, 2016, 2024, 2025
Whitehall	10	1984, 1985, 1987, 2002, 2003, 2006, 2007, 2009, 2014, 2024
Melrose-Mindoro	7	2000, 2001, 2008, 2017, 2018, 2019, 2020
Augusta	3	1983, 1986, 2015
Gilmanton	3	1993, 2002, 2005
Immanuel Lutheran	3	2006, 2012, 2013
Osseo-Fairchild	3	1980, 1981, 1982
Alma	2	1986, 2003
Alma/ Pepin	1	2012
Blair	0	
Independence/ Gilmanton	0	
Luther	0	
Taylor	0	

=== Football ===
School	Quantity	Years
Augusta	11	1959, 1961, 1972, 1980, 1984, 1985, 1986, 1987, 1988, 1989, 2021
Eleva-Strum	11	1960, 1963, 1965, 1969, 1970, 1973, 1987, 2004, 2007, 2014, 2015
Whitehall	11	1967, 1968, 1974, 1975, 1978, 1979, 1985, 1992, 2006, 2009, 2012
Melrose-Mindoro	10	1988, 1997, 1999, 2002, 2003, 2009, 2015, 2016, 2017, 2018
Osseo-Fairchild	9	1968, 1970, 1974, 1976, 1977, 1981, 1982, 1983, 1984
Blair-Taylor	8	1998, 2008, 2009, 2010, 2011, 2019, 2020, 2024
Cochrane-Fountain City	7	1966, 1994, 2000, 2014, 2024, 2025, 2026
Independence	7	1962, 1964, 1971, 1974, 1975, 1994, 2001
Luther	3	1991, 1993, 1995
Pepin/ Alma	3	2022, 2023, 2024
Alma/ Gilmanton	2	1990, 1996
Alma	1	2005
Independence/ Gilmanton	1	2014
Alma Center Lincoln	0	
Blair	0	
Blair/ Taylor	0	
