= West Central Conference (Wisconsin) =

Wisconsin high school athletic conference (1959-1977)

The West Central Conference is a former high school athletic conference in Wisconsin, competing from 1959 to 1977. Most of its members were public schools affiliated with the Wisconsin Interscholastic Athletic Association.

== History ==
Location of Original West Central Conference Members
Location of Final West Central Conference Members

The West Central Conference was formed in 1959 by eight small high schools in west central Wisconsin: Alma, Arkansaw, Fairchild, Gilmanton, Hixton, Lincoln in Alma Center, Pepin and Taylor. The conference's eighteen-year history was marked by instability, as they were constantly affected by defections, rural consolidation and school closings. Only two years after it was formed, the West Central Conference lost three member schools. Alma Center Lincoln left to join the Dairyland Conference, Arkansaw became a member of the Dunn-St. Croix Conference, and Hixton was closed after its district consolidated with Black River Falls. Three years after they left the West Central Conference, Arkansaw rejoined to bring membership back up to six schools. Pepin left the West Central in 1966 to join the Dunn-St. Croix Conference, and they were replaced by two private high schools: Immanuel Lutheran in Eau Claire and St. Felix out of Wabasha, Minnesota. Two members left the conference in 1968, as Fairchild merged with Osseo and St. Felix discontinued their high school program. The conference was left with four members in 1971, as Alma left to join the Dairyland Conference. The West Central Conference met its end in 1977, as Gilmanton and Taylor joined the Dairyland Conference, Arkansaw rejoined the Dunn-St. Croix Conference, and Immanuel Lutheran was left to compete as an independent. Two years later, Immanuel Lutheran joined the Wisconsin Independent Schools Athletic Association, where they competed before its merger with the WIAA and entry into the Dairyland Conference in 2000.

== Conference membership history ==
=== Final members ===
School	Location	Affiliation	Mascot	Colors	Joined	Left	Conference Joined	Current Conference
Arkansaw	Arkansaw, WI	Public	Travelers		1959, 1964	1961, 1977	Dunn-St. Croix	Closed in 1992 (consolidated into Durand)
Gilmanton	Gilmanton, WI	Public	Panthers		1959	1977	Dairyland	Dairyland (coop with Independence)
Immanuel Lutheran	Eau Claire, WI	Private (Lutheran, CLC)	Lancers		1966	1977	Independent	Dairyland
Taylor	Taylor, WI	Public	Trojans		1959	1977	Dairyland	Closed in 1989 (merged into Blair-Taylor)

=== Previous members ===
School	Location	Affiliation	Mascot	Colors	Joined	Left	Conference Joined	Current Conference
Alma	Alma, WI	Public	Rivermen		1959	1971	Dairyland	Dairyland (coop with Pepin)
Alma Center Lincoln	Alma Center, WI	Public	Hornets		1959	1961	Dairyland	
Fairchild	Fairchild, WI	Public	Purple Dragons		1959	1968	Closed (merged into Osseo-Fairchild)	
Hixton	Hixton, WI	Public	Vikings		1959	1961	Closed (consolidated into Black River Falls)	
Pepin	Pepin, WI	Public	Lakers		1959	1966	Dunn-St. Croix	Dairyland (coop with Alma)
St. Felix	Wabasha, MN	Private (Catholic)	Yellowjackets		1966	1968	Closed (discontinued high school grades)	

== List of state champions ==
=== Fall sports ===
None

=== Winter sports ===
None

=== Spring sports ===
None

=== Summer sports ===
Baseball
School	Year	Division
Alma	1971	Single Division

== List of conference champions ==
=== Boys Basketball ===
School	Quantity	Years
Alma	9	1960, 1963, 1964, 1965, 1966, 1967, 1968, 1970, 1971
Gilmanton	4	1969, 1975, 1976, 1977
Taylor	4	1962, 1964, 1973, 1974
Immanuel Lutheran	2	1972, 1974
Alma Center Lincoln	1	1961
Arkansaw	1	1972
Fairchild	0	
Hixton	0	
Pepin	0	
St. Felix	0	
