= George Caldwell (Wisconsin politician) =

American politician

George F. Caldwell

Member of the Wisconsin State Assembly from the Eau Claire 2nd district
- In office January 7, 1889 – January 5, 1891
- Preceded by: District established
- Succeeded by: Oscar Finch

Personal details
- Born: June 20, 1840 Chautauqua County, New York
- Died: August 19, 1933 (aged 93)
- Resting place: East Lawn Cemetery, Augusta, Wisconsin
- Party: Republican
- Spouse: Helen Harkness (m. 1861)
- Children: Nellie (Sawyer)^{(dob unknown)}; Anengo W. Caldwell^{(dob unknown)}; Eva Caldwell^{(dob unknown)}; George Caldwell^{(b. 1864; died 1901)}; Grace C. (Bush)^{(b. 1870; died 1964)}; Archie Caldwell^{(b. 1879; died 1880)}; Helen Blanche (Fletcher)^{(b. 1881)}; Ryall Robert Caldwell^{(b. 1884; died 1956)}

Military service
- Allegiance: United States
- Branch/service: United States Volunteers; Union Army
- Years of service: 1863–1865
- Rank: Corporal, USV
- Unit: 32nd Reg. Wis. Vol. Infantry; 16th Reg. Wis. Vol. Infantry
- Battles/wars: American Civil War

George Freeman Caldwell (June 20, 1840 – August 19, 1933) was an American farmer and Republican politician. He was a member of the Wisconsin State Assembly for the 1889–1890 session.

== Biography ==
Caldwell was born on June 20, 1840, in Chautauqua County, New York. During the American Civil War, he served with the 32nd Wisconsin Volunteer Infantry Regiment and the 16th Wisconsin Volunteer Infantry Regiment of the Union Army. Later, he owned a farm in Otter Creek, Eau Claire County, Wisconsin. Caldwell's other places of residence include Walworth County, Wisconsin; Winnebago County, Wisconsin; Olmsted County, Minnesota; Winona County, Minnesota; and Augusta, Wisconsin.

In 1861, Caldwell married Helen Harkness. They had eight children. Caldwell was a Baptist.

== Political career ==
Caldwell was elected to the Assembly in 1888. Other positions he held include chairman (similar to mayor) and member of the town board (similar to city council) of Otter Creek. He was a Republican.

Wisconsin State Assembly
New district	Member of the Wisconsin State Assembly from the Eau Claire 2nd district January 7, 1889 – January 5, 1891	Succeeded by Oscar Finch
