= Mississippi Valley (disambiguation) =

The Mississippi Valley is a valley which the Mississippi River flows through.

Mississippi Valley may also refer to:

- Mississippi Valley Airlines, former regional airline in the Upper Midwest of the United States
- Mississippi Valley Conference (disambiguation)
- Mississippi Valley Division, military unit responsible for the area surrounding the Mississippi River
- Mississippi Valley League, former baseball Class D minor league
- Mississippi Valley State University, public HBCU located in Itta Bena, Mississippi
  - Mississippi Valley State Delta Devils and Devilettes
  - Mississippi Valley State (CDP), Mississippi
- Mississippi-Valley type (MVT), a type of Sphalerite
