= West Salem High School =

West Salem High School may refer to:

- West Salem High School (Salem, Oregon) in Salem, Oregon
- West Salem High School (Wisconsin) in West Salem, Wisconsin
