= Mississippi Valley Conference =

Mississippi Valley Conference may refer to:

== Sports ==
- Mississippi Valley Conference (Illinois), an Illinois-based high school athletic conference
- Mississippi Valley Conference (Iowa), an Iowa-based high school athletic conference
- Mississippi Valley Conference (Missouri), a Missouri-based high school athletic conference
- Mississippi Valley Conference (Wisconsin, 1989–present), a Wisconsin-based high school athletic conference
- Mississippi Valley Conference (Wisconsin, 1933-1965), a former Wisconsin-based high school athletic conference
- Mississippi Valley Conference (college), an intercollegiate athletic conference based in Tennessee that existed from 1928 to 1934
