= Bernard H. Raether =

American politician

Bernard H. Raether (June 15, 1889 – June 24, 1980) was a member of the Wisconsin State Assembly.

== Biography ==
Raether was born on June 15, 1889, in Casco, Wisconsin. He graduated from high school in Eau Claire, Wisconsin, before attending the University of Wisconsin-Eau Claire. He died on June 24, 1980.

== Career ==
Raether was elected to the Assembly in 1954 and was defeated for re-election in 1956. Additionally, he was President of the Eau Claire County, Wisconsin Board and Chairman, Clerk and Assessor of Augusta, Wisconsin. He was a Democrat.
