= Augusta High School (Wisconsin) =

Coordinates: 44.685239°N 91.141543°W

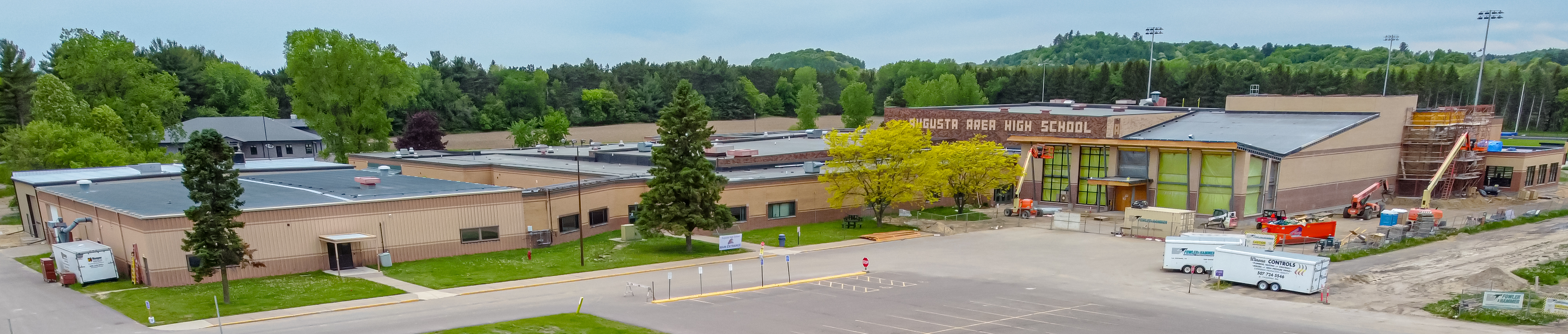
- 19320 Bartig Rd. Augusta, Wisconsin 54722

Information
- Type: Public
- School district: Augusta Area School District
- Principal: Reed Pecha
- Teaching staff: 20.51 (FTE)
- Grades: 9–12
- Enrollment: 164 (2023–2024)
- Student to teacher ratio: 8.00
- Colors: Purple and white
- Mascot: Beaver
- Website: www.augusta.k12.wi.us

Augusta High School is a high school located in Augusta, Wisconsin, United States. It serves grades 9–12 and is part of the Augusta Area School District.

== Athletics ==
Augusta High School participates in athletics as a member of the Dairyland Conference. Their athletic teams are known as the Beavers. Augusta High School won the Wisconsin Interscholastic Athletic Association Division 6 football championship in 1989. Augusta High School won the Wisconsin Interscholastic Athletic Association Division 4 girls basketball championship in 1996, finishing the season with a record of 24–3.

=== Athletic conference affiliation history ===
- Little Eight Conference (1926-1935)
- Mississippi Valley Conference (1935-1959)
- Mississippi Valley Triangular League (1936-1940)
- Dairyland Conference (1959-1990)
- Cloverbelt Conference (1990-2014)
- Dairyland Conference (2014-present)
