= David Garbers =

American biologist

David L. Garbers
- Born: March 17, 1944; La Crosse, Wisconsin
- Died: September 5, 2006 (aged 62); Dallas, Texas
- Citizenship: US
- Education: University of Wisconsin
- Partner(s): Laureen O. Krueger (m. 1967) Marilyn Kay Hanson (m. 1974)
- Children: 2
- Scientific career
- Fields: Reproductive biology
- Doctoral advisor: Henry A. Lardy

David Lorn Garbers (March 17, 1944 – September 5, 2006) was an American scientist who primarily researched reproductive biology, particularly the communication between egg and sperm cells. In 1993, he was elected to the National Academy of Sciences.

== Early life and education ==
David Lorn Garbers was born on March 17, 1944, in La Crosse, Wisconsin, where he grew up on his family's farm. His parents were Florence née Matelski and Wilfred Garbers.

After graduating from West Salem High School, he attended the University of Wisconsin for his undergraduate, receiving a bachelor's in animal science in 1966. He stayed at the University of Wisconsin for a master's in reproductive biology (1970), and a PhD in biochemistry (1972). His PhD advisor was Henry A. Lardy. He then conducted post-doctoral research at Vanderbilt University.

== Career ==
After his post-doc, Garbers was hired as an assistant professor of physiology at Vanderbilt in 1974; he became a full professor in 1982. In 1976, he accepted a position as an investigator at Howard Hughes Medical Institute in Dallas. In 1990 he was hired as a professor of pharmacology at the University of Texas Southwestern Medical Center, and in 1999 was appointed the director of the Cecil H. and Ida Green Center for Reproductive Biology Sciences. He succeeded Joseph F. Hoffman as editor of the peer-reviewed journal the Annual Review of Physiology after he left the position in 2005. His tenure as editor was brief due to his sudden death the following year.

Much of Garbers's research centered on the mechanisms of communication between egg cells and sperm cells. One of Garbers's key findings in reproductive biology was that caffeine stimulated hyperactive motility in mammalian sperm cells by elevating cyclic adenosine monophosphate (cAMP). He also discovered that sea urchin eggs release peptides into the ocean that stimulate sperm motility. The peptides also served as chemoattractants, drawing the sperm to the eggs, by elevating cellular levels of cyclic guanosine monophosphate (cGMP).

== Awards and honors ==
Garbers was elected as a member of several scientific societies, including the American Academy of Arts and Sciences in 1992 and the National Academy of Sciences in 1993. Garbers was inducted to the West Salem High School Alumni Hall of Fame in 2023.

== Personal life and death ==
David Garbers was first married to Laureen O. Krueger in 1967. He later married Marilyn Kay Hanson in 1974. They had two children together. Garbers died at age sixty-two of a heart attack on September 5, 2006.
