= Luther High School (Wisconsin) =

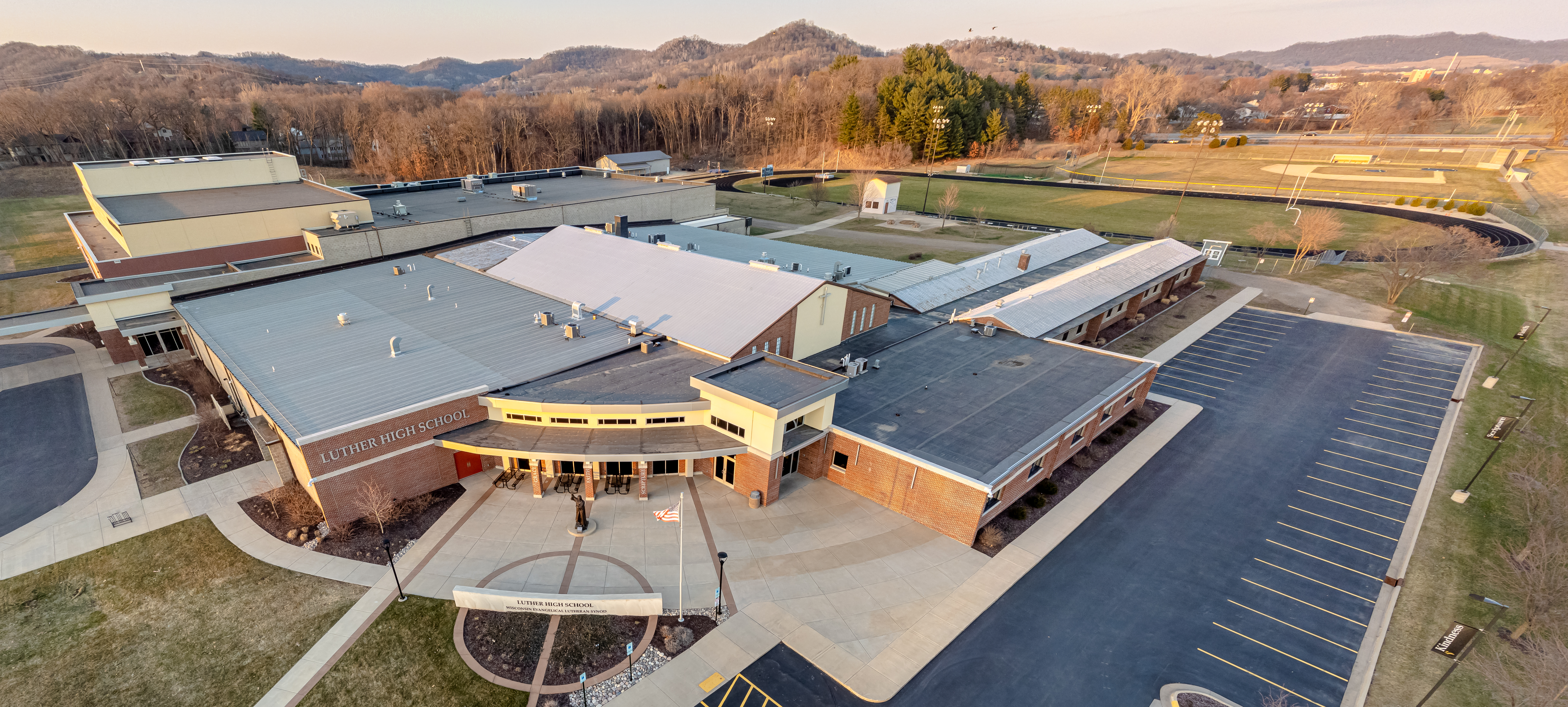

Location
- 1501 Wilson Street; Onalaska, Wisconsin 54650; United States
- Coordinates: 43°52′40.0″N 91°12′51.4″W

Information
- Type: Parochial 4-year
- Motto: Keeping Christ In Higher Education
- Religious affiliation: Wisconsin Evangelical Lutheran Synod
- Established: 1957
- Principal: Jon Beilke
- Enrollment: 235 (2014-15)
- Colors: Black, Gold, and White
- Mascot: Knight
- Rival: Onalaska High School
- Information: (608) 783-5435
- Website: https://www.lutherhigh.org/

Luther High School is a parochial school located in Onalaska, Wisconsin. It is associated with the Wisconsin Evangelical Lutheran Synod. The majority of the students come from a group of churches in the area with the same religious affiliation. Some students come from as far away as Tomah, Wisconsin or Lewiston, Minnesota.

The school's athletic teams participate in the Coulee Conference in the Wisconsin Interscholastic Athletic Association (WIAA).

== History ==
Luther High School opened on September 8, 1957. The original class consisted of 29 ninth graders. The school was opened as a subsidiary of the Wisconsin Evangelical Lutheran Synod, with the original feeder congregations being the four churches in the La Crosse area: First Lutheran, Mt. Calvary, Grace, and Immanuel. Of these four, only First Lutheran and Immanuel had elementary school programs from which to draw students. The following years brought steady increases to enrollment (46 in 1958 and 72 in 1959) that allowed for expansion of the school and an addition to the school structure. Since then, the school has had several additions to accommodate growing enrollment and technical advancements.

Luther High School hosted a 50th anniversary celebration in 2007. Current faculty, past faculty, and past students presented at the day-long celebration. A book containing a photographic history of the previous 25 years was produced for the event.

== Athletics ==
The football team made playoffs for the first time as a WIAA school in 2007 and finished the year with 7 wins and 3 losses.

The girls' basketball team won the Coulee title in 2008 by going undefeated in the conference and won the regionals, beating Aquinas.

=== WIAA ===
Luther competes in the Coulee Conference and the Wisconsin Interscholastic Athletic Association (WIAA) at the state level. The school's hockey team, the Avalanche, is a co–op team composed of students from Aquinas, Holmen High School, Luther, and Coulee Christian High School. Luther has competed in the WIAA since 2000, and have won one state title.

WIAA state champion titles:

- Boys Basketball: 2023

=== WISAA ===
Luther competed in the Wisconsin Independent Schools Athletic Association (WISAA) from 1968 to 2000. The Knights won four WISAA state titles.

WISAA state champion titles:

- Girls Track & Field: 1976, 1977, 1981, 1982

=== Athletic conference affiliation history ===
- Bi-State Conference (1961-1966)
- Dairyland Conference (1991-1997)
- Coulee Conference (1997-present)

== Notable alumni ==
- Dan Kapanke, Wisconsin Senate

== See also ==
- La Crosse Central High School
- La Crosse Logan High School
- Onalaska High School
- Holmen High School
- West Salem High School
- Aquinas High School
