= Immanuel Lutheran College (Eau Claire) =

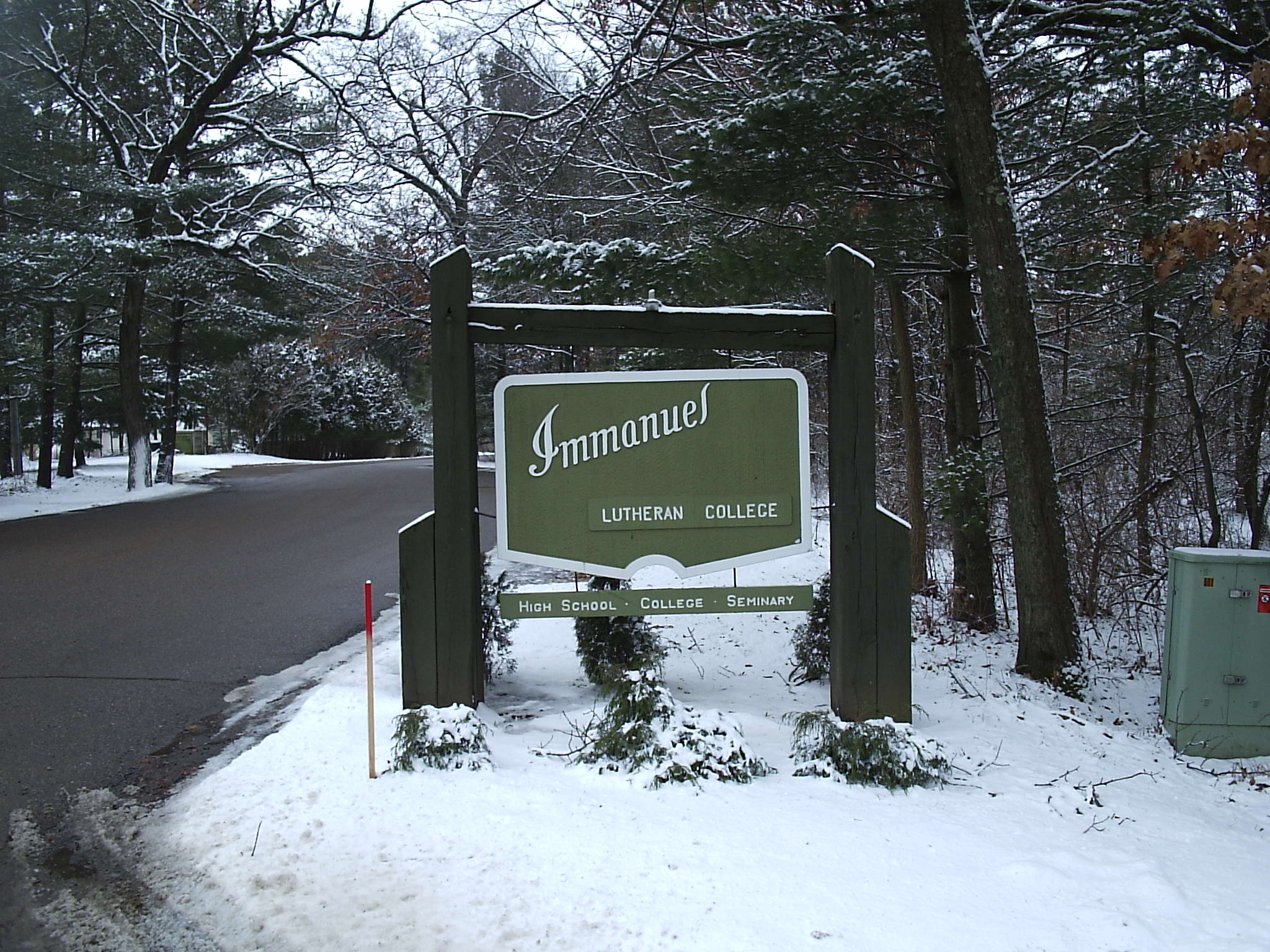

Location
- Eau Claire, Wisconsin; United States
- Coordinates: 44°46′28″N 91°30′19″W

Information
- Religious affiliation: Church of the Lutheran Confession
- Established: 1959; 67 years ago
- Grades: High school, college, and seminary
- Campus size: 80 acres (32 ha)

Immanuel Lutheran College, located in Eau Claire, Wisconsin, since 1963, is a high school, college, and seminary campus of the Church of the Lutheran Confession (CLC).

== History ==
Immanuel Lutheran College began in 1959 in Mankato, Minnesota, where it was founded by Immanuel Lutheran Church. Student originally took secular courses at Minnesota State University and religion courses at the college. It was incorporated into the Church of the Lutheran Confession (CLC) in 1961, and a new building was constructed in Eau Claire, Wisconsin, in 1963, where classes began in September of that year.

== High school ==
Immanuel Lutheran High School enrolls 110–120 students in grades 9–12 each year, making it the largest section of Immanuel's three levels of schooling. The school is residential, and students take traditional high school courses along with religion classes. The high school also offers various athletic and extracurricular events for students.

=== Athletics ===
Immanuel Lutheran High School's athletic teams are known as the Lancers, and their colors are green and gold. They have been affiliated with the Dairyland Conference since 2000.

==== Athletic conference affiliation history ====
- West Central Conference (1966–1977)
- Dairyland Conference (2000–present)

== College ==
Immanuel Lutheran College is also residential, and it offers four degrees:

- Associate of Arts in Liberal Arts
- Bachelor of Science in Elementary Education
- Bachelor of Arts in Pre-Theology
- Bachelor of Arts in Religious Studies

It also has a college choir, which has had small tours in the United States performing at CLC churches.

== Seminary ==
Immanuel Lutheran Seminary is a three-year seminary program which exists to train men as pastors for CLC-associated churches. The seminary does not enroll women.

== Campus ==
The college sits on 80 acres (32 ha) of land and is composed of several buildings, including the Academic Center, Ingram Hall (seminary building), three dormitories (segregated by gender), and the Commons. The school also has a field house near its athletic fields, and a set of ten houses for professors called Prof Row.
