= Melrose-Mindoro Area School District =

School district in Wisconsin, United States

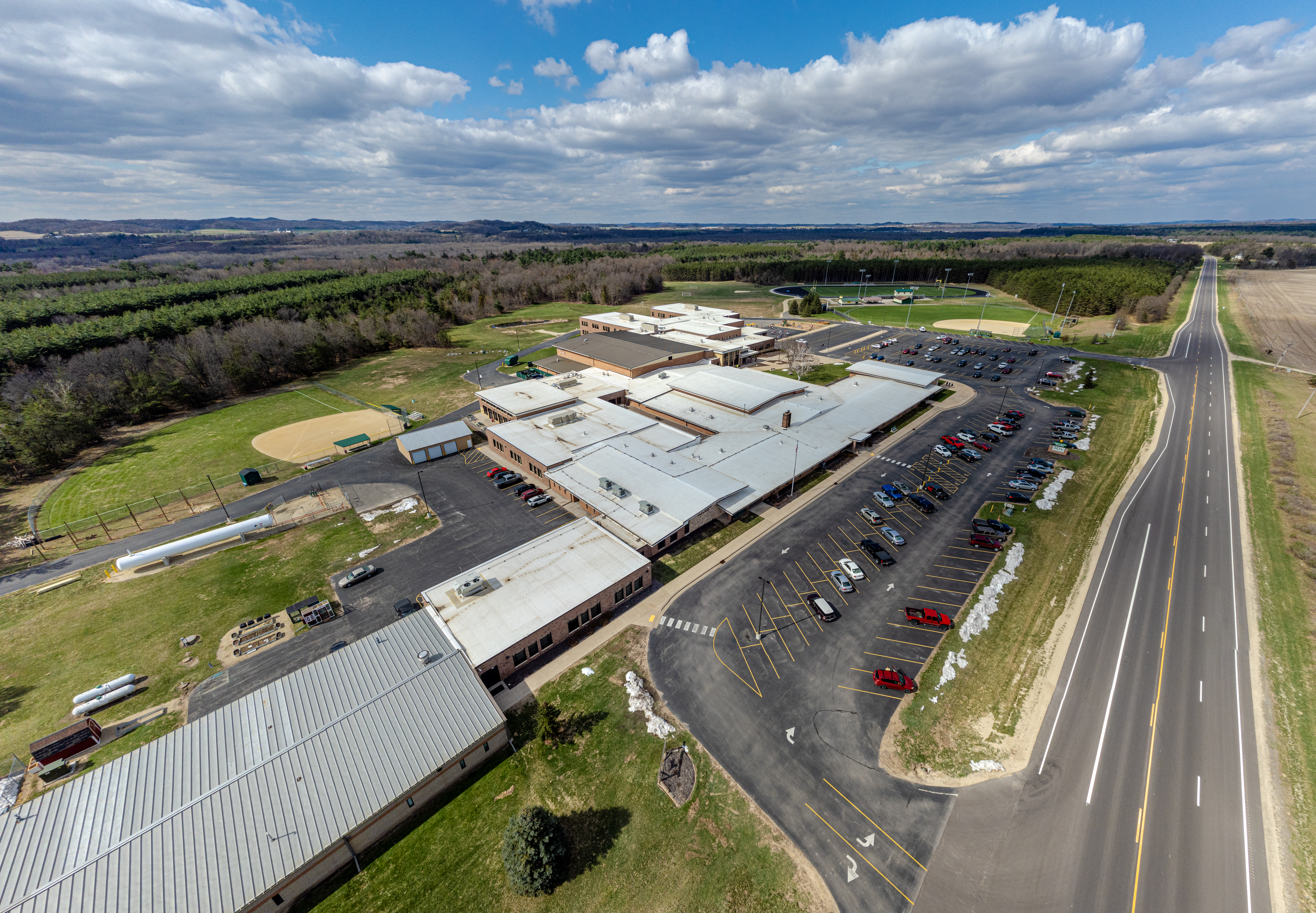
- Melrose-Mindoro schools on Wisconsin Highway 108

Location
- N181 State Road 108 Melrose, Wisconsin, 54642; United States

District information
- Grades: PK–12
- Schools: 2
- NCES District ID: 5509000

Students and staff
- Students: 720 (2023–24)
- Teachers: 60.18 (on an FTE basis)
- Student–teacher ratio: 11.96

Other information
- Website: www.mel-min.k12.wi.us

Melrose-Mindoro School District is centered in the town of Farmington, La Crosse County, Wisconsin. The Melrose-Mindoro School District is spread over three counties. It has 770 students attending three schools in grades PK and K-12. According to state standards, 45% of students in this district are considered proficient in math and/or reading. The district has an annual budget of $8,751,000, spending an average of $11,684 per student. The District Office is located at N181 State Rd 108, Melrose, Wisconsin 54642.

== Geography ==
The district is located in the three counties:

- Jackson
- La Crosse
- Monroe

=== Municipalities ===
- Burns
- Farmington
- Franklin
- Hamilton
- Irving
- Little Falls
- Melrose
- North Bend
- Onalaska
- Village of Melrose

== Schools ==
- Melrose-Mindoro High School, grades 7–12
- Melrose-Mindoro Elementary, grades PK–6
