= Aquinas High School (Wisconsin) =

High school in La Crosse, Wisconsin, United States

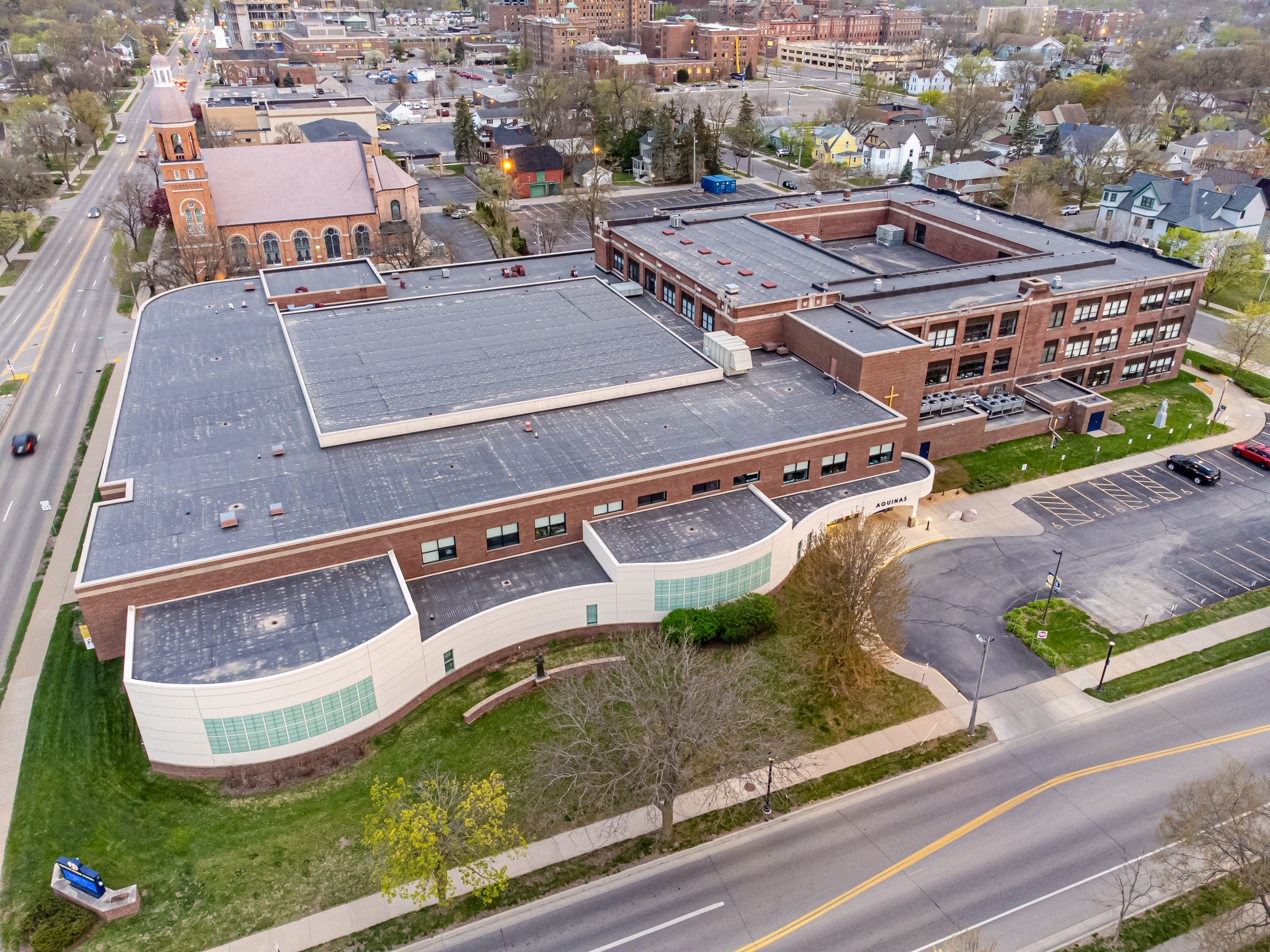

Location
- 315 11th Street South; La Crosse, (La Crosse County), Wisconsin 54601; United States
- 43°48′29″N 91°14′24″W

Information
- Type: Private, Parochial, Coeducational
- Religious affiliation: Roman Catholic
- Established: 1928
- Principal: Adam Poellinger
- Chaplain: Fr. Daniel Sedlacek
- Grades: 9–12
- Enrollment: 338 (2013-2014 school year)
- Colors: Navy blue and old gold
- Athletics conference: Mississippi Valley Conference
- Team name: Blugolds
- Accreditation: North Central Association of Colleges and Schools
- Affiliation: Diocese of La Crosse
- Athletic Director: Pam Donarski
- Website: http://www.AquinasCatholicSchools.org

Aquinas High School is a Roman Catholic high school located in La Crosse, Wisconsin. The school is part of La Crosse Aquinas Catholic Schools and is operated by the Diocese of La Crosse.

In 2008, Aquinas High School was named a national Blue Ribbon School.

== History ==
The high school was dedicated on September 2, 1928, in honor of Thomas Aquinas by Bishop Alexander Joseph McGavick of the Diocese of La Crosse. The first graduating class of 1929 consisted of four girls. The high school was originally staffed by diocesan clergy and the Franciscan Sisters of Perpetual Adoration.

Diocesan Bishop John Joseph Paul, an Aquinas alumnus of the class of 1935, set aside some rooms at Aquinas High School for the Aquinas Middle School in 1992. In 1997, the Bishop Burke Hall addition to Aquinas High School was dedicated in honor of Bishop Raymond Leo Burke, now the Prefect of the Apostolic Signatura in the Vatican City and a former religion teacher at Aquinas High School.

=== School crest ===
The Aquinas High School crest, designed in 1942, first appeared in the yearbook, the Trumpet, and on the 1943 class rings. It features the cross in a central and prominent position on the crest, reflecting the importance of the faith and redemption it symbolizes; ΧΡ, the first two letters of the Greek word for Christ, signifying that the life of a Christian should be centered around Christ; the fleur-de-lis, the symbol of sanctity and virtue, symbolizing God, man's final end, and the Blessed Virgin, model of virtue; a lamp of learning and books, as symbols of knowledge and learning; a laurel, symbolizing reward; and lilies of the valley, symbolizing humility.

== Athletics ==
=== WIAA ===
Aquinas competes in the Mississippi Valley Conference (MVC) and the Wisconsin Interscholastic Athletic Association (WIAA) with baseball, basketball, cross country, dance, football (Coulee Conference), golf, gymnastics, skiing, soccer, softball, swimming, tennis, track and field, volleyball, and wrestling teams. The school's hockey team, the Avalanche, is a co–op team composed of students from Aquinas, Holmen High School, Luther High School, and Coulee Christian High School. Aquinas has competed in the WIAA since 2000, winning 26 state titles across 10 different sports.

WIAA state champion titles:

- Boys Baseball: 2007, 2017, 2024
- Boys Basketball: 2003, 2008, 2011, 2013, 2025
- Boys Track & Field: 2011, 2019, 2021
- Boys Cross Country: 2007, 2018, 2019, 2020
- Football: 2007, 2021, 2022, 2023
- Girls Basketball: 2018, 2019
- Girls Golf: 2017
- Girls Soccer: 2015
- Girls Track & Field: 2012, 2019
- Wrestling: 2026

=== WISAA ===
Aquinas competed in the Central Wisconsin Catholic Conference from 1964 to 1997 and the Wisconsin Independent Schools Athletic Association (WISAA) from 1968 to 2000. The Blugolds won 36 WISAA state titles across 10 different sports.

WISAA state champion titles:

- Boys Baseball: 1984, 1985, 1986, 1987
- Boys Cross Country: 1977, 1979
- Boys Track & Field: 1980, 1981, 1982
- Football: 1993, 1995
- Girls Basketball: 1996, 1997
- Girls Cross Country: 1986, 1987, 1996
- Girls Track & Field: 1976, 1977, 1978, 1981, 1997
- Golf: 1970, 1974, 1975, 1977, 1995
- Volleyball: 1984
- Wrestling: 1983, 1985, 1986, 1987, 1988, 1989, 1990, 1997, 1999

=== WCIAA ===
Aquinas competed in the Wisconsin Catholic Interscholastic Athletic Association (WCIAA) from 1957 to 1968. The Blugolds won nine WCIAA state titles across four different sports.

WCIAA state champion titles:

- Basketball: 1941, 1944, 1946, 1949, 1950
- Golf: 1957
- Track & Field: 1964
- Wrestling: 1967, 1968

== Performing arts ==
=== Dance Team ===
The Aquinas dance team competes in the Wisconsin Association of Cheer/Pom Coaches (WACPC) and has won 12 state championships:

- 2015 (Division 5 Pom)
- 2016 (Division 5 Pom)
- 2017 (Division 5 Pom)
- 2018 (Division 5 Pom)
- 2019 (Division 5 Pom)
- 2020 (Division 5 Pom)
- 2020 (Division 3 Jazz)
- 2022 (Division 6 Pom)
- 2023 (Division 3 Jazz)
- 2024 (Division 6 Pom)
- 2025 (Division 6 Pom)
- 2026 (Division 6 Pom)

== Affiliation ==
- Aquinas Catholic Schools (formerly Coulee Catholic School)
- National Catholic Educational Association (NCEA)
- Greater La Crosse Area Chamber of Commerce
- Mississippi Valley Conference (1997-present)
- Wisconsin Interscholastic Athletic Association (2000-present)
- Wisconsin Independent Schools Athletic Association (1968-2000)
- Central Wisconsin Catholic Conference (1964-1997)
- North Central Accrediting Association

== Principals ==
- Father Hilary Leuther, 1928–1936
- Father Joseph Kundinger, 1936–1940, 1946–1951
- Father John Prizl, 1940–1946
- Father Alfred Hebert, 1951–1952
- Father Robert Hansen, 1952–1960
- Father Richard Rossiter, 1960–1964
- Father James O'Connell, 1964–1972
- Father Robert Altmann, 1972–1990
- James Vail, 1990–1997
- Jeffrey Brengman, 1997–2001
- Father John McHugh, 2001–2002
- Joan Leonard, 2002–2004
- Philip Hahn, 2004–2006
- Patrick Burkhart, 2006–2007
- Ted Knutson, 2007–2016
- Denise Ring, 2016–2022
- Andrew Bradley, 2022–2024
- Adam Poellinger 2024–Present

== Notable faculty ==
- Ann Walsh Bradley, Wisconsin Supreme Court justice, former religion teacher at Aquinas High School
- Raymond Leo Burke, teacher of religion at Aquinas High School prior to becoming bishop, archbishop, and cardinal.
- George Albert Hammes, teacher at Aquinas High School prior to becoming bishop

== Notable alumni ==
- Sylvester G. Clements, 1954, former member of the Wisconsin State Assembly
- Charles Dierkop, actor, attended Aquinas High School
- Lexi Donarski, 2020, basketball player
- Steve Doyle, member of the Wisconsin State Assembly
- Charles E. Knoblauch, former member of the Iowa House of Representatives
- Bronson Koenig, basketball player
- Robert E. Kreutz, composer, 1940
- Paul Marcotte, 1945, businessman and former member of Kentucky House of Representatives
- John Medinger, former mayor of La Crosse, Wisconsin, former member of Wisconsin State Assembly, 1966
- John Oestreicher, 1954, former member of the Wisconsin State Assembly
- John Joseph Paul, 1935 graduate of Aquinas High School who served as Bishop of the Diocese of La Crosse, 1985–1994
- John Rusche, 1969, physician and former member of the Idaho House of Representatives
- Ed Servais, head coach of the Creighton Bluejays baseball team
- Jim Temp, Green Bay Packers

== See also ==
- La Crosse Central High School
- La Crosse Logan High School
- Onalaska High School
- Holmen High School
- West Salem High School
- Luther High School
