= Melrose-Mindoro High School =

Coordinates: 44°04′28″N 91°01′15″W

Melrose-Mindoro Junior/Senior High School
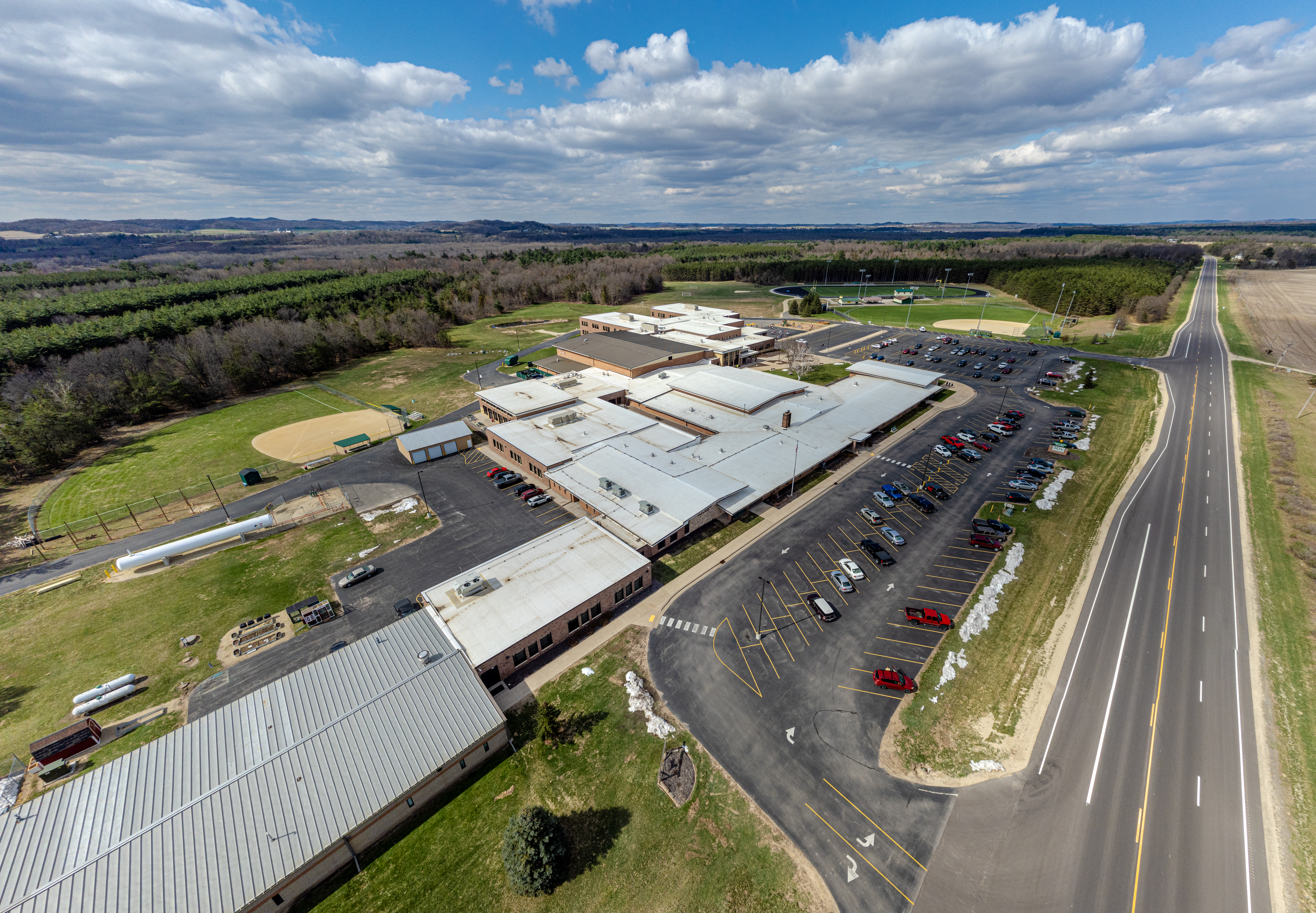

Location
- N181 State Highway 108; Melrose, Wisconsin, (Jackson County) 54642; United States

Information
- Type: Public high school
- Motto: Kids Come First
- Opened: May 21, 1967
- School district: Melrose-Mindoro Area School District
- NCES School ID: 550900001051
- Principal: Richard Dobbs
- Teaching staff: 25.62 (on an FTE basis)
- Grades: 7–12
- Enrollment: 317 (2023-2024)
- Student to teacher ratio: 12.37
- Colors: Green and gold
- Fight song: "Washington and Lee Swing"
- Athletics conference: Dairyland Conference
- Nickname: Mustangs
- Website: www.mel-min.k12.wi.us/schools/high/

Melrose-Mindoro High School is a public junior/senior high school serving grades 7 through 12. It is located at N181 State Rd.108, Melrose, Wisconsin. The school is part of the Melrose-Mindoro Area School District. The school mascot is the Mustang.

== See also ==
- Wisconsin Highway 108
