= Oscar Finch =

American politician

Oscar Finch (October 28, 1827 – March 25, 1913) was an American miller and politician.

Born in Windham, Greene County, New York, Finch moved to Sauk County, Wisconsin in 1868. In 1880, Finch moved to Augusta, Wisconsin. He was a miller. In 1887, 1888, and 1889, Finch was mayor of Augusta and was a Democrat. In 1891, Finch served in the Wisconsin State Assembly. Finch died at his home in Augusta, Wisconsin.
