= Arcadia High School (Wisconsin) =

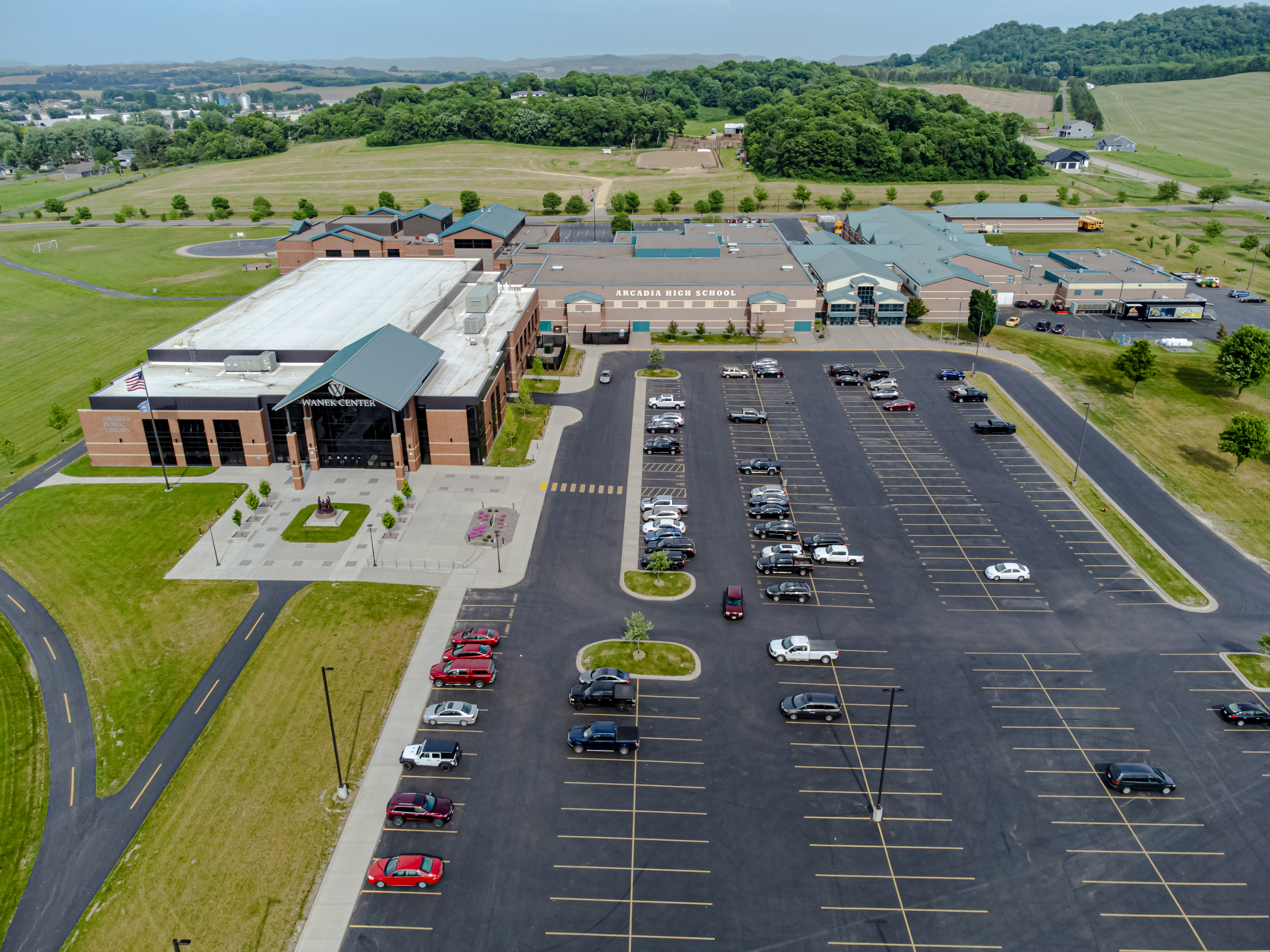

Location
- 756 Raider Drive; Arcadia, (Trempealeau County), Wisconsin 54612; United States; 44.242063°N 91.487342°W

Information
- School type: Public school (government funded), high school
- Established: 1998
- School district: Arcadia School District
- NCES District ID: 5500420
- Superintendent: Louie Ferguson
- CEEB code: 500065
- NCES School ID: 550042000068
- Principal: Michele Butler
- Teaching staff: 27.75 (on an FTE basis)
- Grades: 9–12
- Enrollment: 430 (2023-2024)
- Student to teacher ratio: 15.50
- Colors: Red and Black
- Mascot: Raiders
- Feeder schools: Arcadia Middle School
- Website: https://ahs.arcadia.k12.wi.us/

Arcadia High School is a high school in Arcadia, Wisconsin, USA. The school is in a very rural area, and the Arcadia School District covers approximately 211 square miles (550 km^{2}), drawing students from both Trempealeau and Buffalo counties. Small townships that attend Arcadia High School include the communities of Pine Creek, North Creek, Dodge, and Waumandee. The high school is located on the southern edge of the city and neighbors Memorial Park.

Arcadia High School was built in 1998 and houses grades 9–12. The school also offers learning opportunities for middle school students in the afternoon. Arcadia High School's enrollment is consistently less than 310. The school offers opportunities for the growing Latino population and holds a foreign exchange student program.

== Courses ==
Courses taught at Arcadia High School include Agriculture, Anatomy, Genetics, Biology, Accounting, Information Processing, and Introduction to Business.

== Athletics ==
Arcadia High School men's sports include cross country, football, basketball, wrestling, golf, track, and baseball. Women's sports programs include cheer, cross country, volleyball, golf, gymnastics, basketball, dance team, softball, and track. The school competes in the Division 3 section of the Wisconsin Interscholastic Athletic Association (WIAA) in most sports. The football program competes in Division 5 and the track, wrestling and gymnastics programs compete in Division 2.

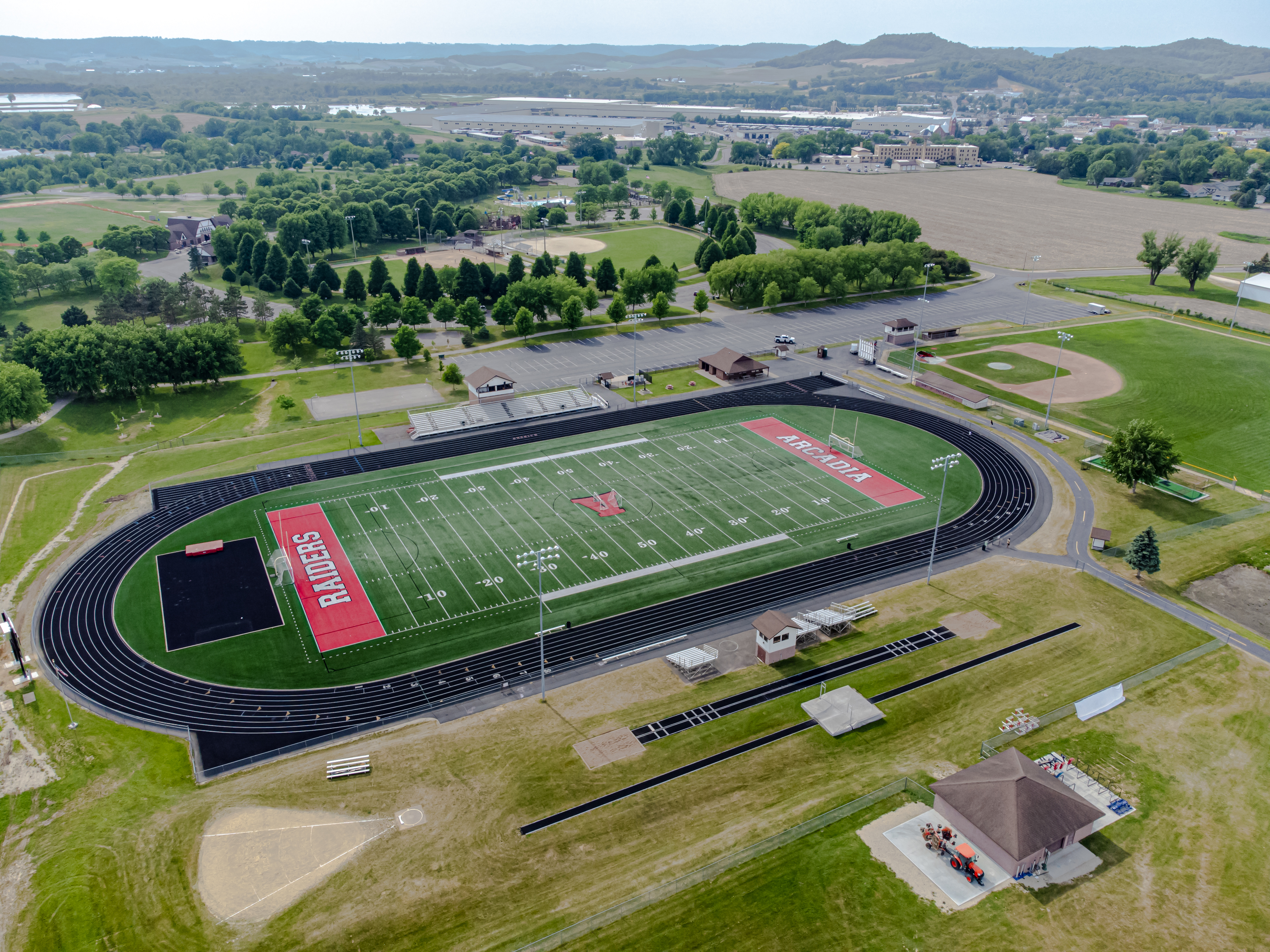
Arcadia High School athletic fields

=== Athletic conference affiliation history ===
- Mississippi Valley Conference (1933-1965)
- Coulee Conference (1965–present)

== Activities and clubs ==
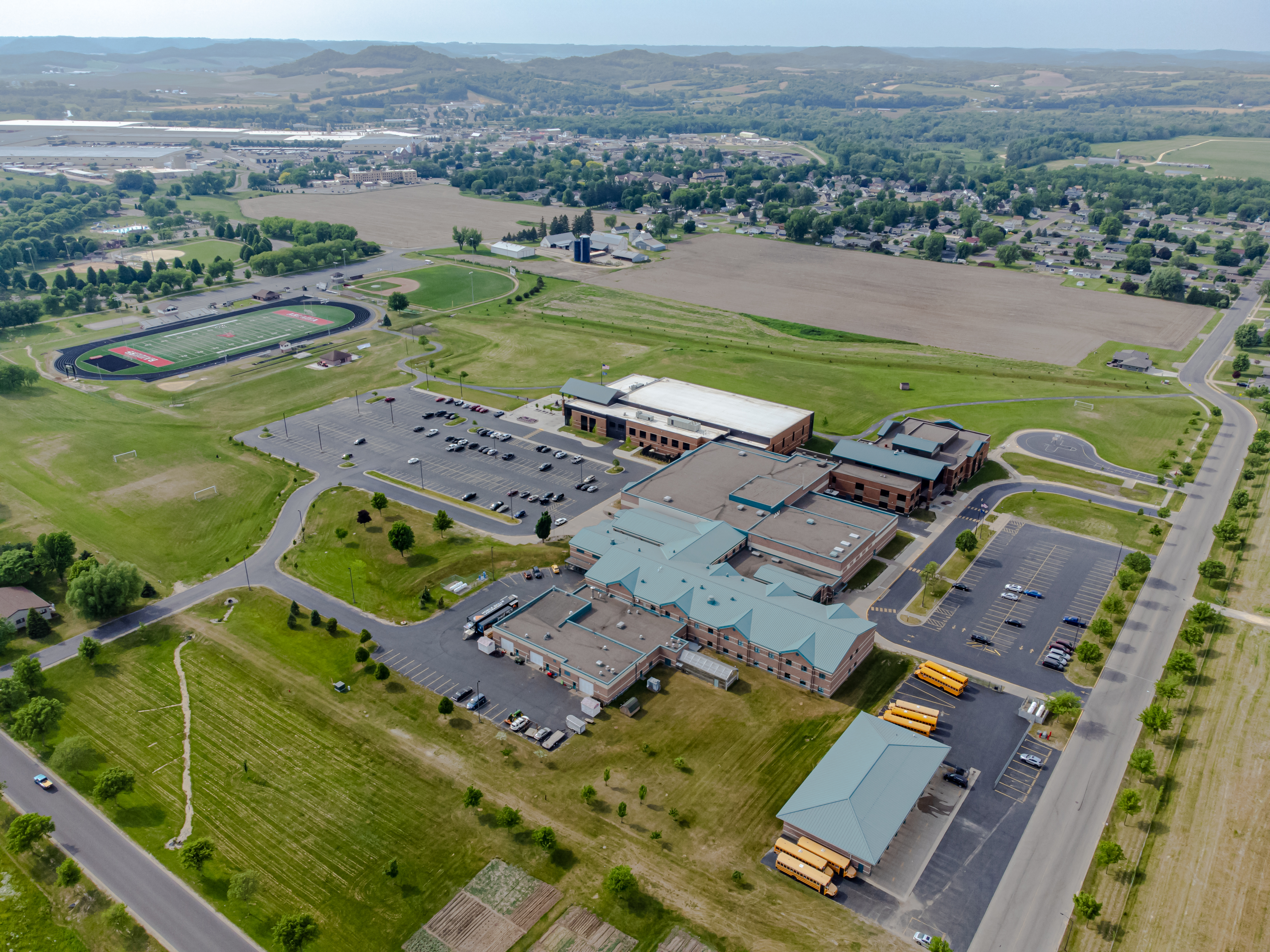
Arcadia High School

Arcadia High School offers a variety of different clubs. Such clubs include FFA, Computer Club, Librarian's club, A-Club, FBLA, FCCLA, NHS, and Masquers. The school also offers activities to keep the students engaged in school. These activities include Forensics and various wood shop activities.
