= Coulee Conference =

Wisconsin high school athletic conference

The Coulee Conference is a high school athletic conference of medium-sized schools based in west central Wisconsin. Founded in 1926, it is one of Wisconsin's oldest athletic conferences and its member schools are affiliated with the Wisconsin Interscholastic Athletic Association.

== History ==
=== 1926-1977 ===
Location of Original Coulee Conference Members

The Coulee Conference was formed in 1926 by six small high schools in west central Wisconsin: Bangor, Galesville, Holmen, Mindoro, Onalaska and West Salem. The original member schools were located in La Crosse and Trempealeau Counties, and the conference was named after the Coulee Region in the southwestern part of Wisconsin's Driftless Area. Membership increased to seven schools in 1936 when Trempealeau joined the Coulee Conference and eight in 1942 when Melrose became members. After Galesville's merger with Ettrick in 1949, the Coulee Conference's roster remained consistent for sixteen years until Melrose and Mindoro merged in 1965, with the new school (Melrose-Mindoro) taking on the membership of its two predecessors. Arcadia moved over from the original Mississippi Valley Conference to keep membership at eight schools. In 1971, Gale-Ettrick merged with Trempealeau to create the new Gale-Ettrick-Trempealeau High School, with the new school remaining in the Coulee Conference. As in the previous consolidation of conference members, the ledger was kept at eight schools by adding Cochrane-Fountain City from the Dairyland Conference.

=== 1977-1987 ===
In 1977, the Coulee Conference lost three members to conference realignment in the region: two to the Dairyland Conference: (Cochrane-Fountain City and Melrose-Mindoro) and one to the Scenic Central Conference (Bangor) Replacing the three exiting schools were Black River Falls from the South Central Conference and two schools from the Scenic Central Conference (Royall and Westby). Royall was strongly opposed to being placed in the Coulee Conference for a multitude of reasons including small size compared to other Coulee schools, increased travel distances, and loss of traditional Scenic Central rivalries. After the WIAA's two-year freeze on conference realignment expired in 1979, Royall joined with their former Scenic Central brethren to form the new Scenic Bluffs Conference. The next year, the Coulee Conference accepted its first (and to date, only) out-of-state member, adding La Crescent from Minnesota (located across the Mississippi River from La Crosse) as Royall's replacement.

=== 1987-present ===
Membership in the Coulee Conference remained consistent for most of the 1980s, with Viroqua moving over from the Southwest Wisconsin Athletic League as the conference's ninth member in 1987. This would turn out to be the high water mark for the conference, as Holmen and Onalaska were growing in enrollment beyond the size their conference rivals and wanted to explore other options. Both schools left to become charter members of the new Mississippi Valley Conference in 1989 with former members of the Big Rivers (La Crosse Central and La Crosse Logan) and South Central (Sparta and Tomah) Conferences. In 1996, Luther High School in Onalaska was invited to join the Coulee Conference after being expelled from their former home in the Dairyland Conference. They began conference play the next year, and the Coulee Conference's roster remained consistent for the next decade. In 2007, La Crescent-Hokah returned to a Minnesota-based conference as they left to become members of the Hiawatha Valley League, bringing the Coulee Conference to its current alignment of seven schools. In March 2026, the WIAA Board of Control approved Viroqua's request to leave the Coulee Conference for membership in the Southwest Wisconsin Conference beginning with the 2027-28 school year, ending their four-decade run in the Coulee and decreasing conference membership to six.

=== Football ===
The Coulee Conference sponsored football for the first time with the 1959 season, and six conference members comprised the initial roster: Bangor, Gale-Ettrick, Holmen, Onalaska, Trempealeau and West Salem. By the 1964 season, all eight Coulee Conference members were football participants, and aside from a few schools that briefly left the conference, membership for football mirrored membership for all other sports. For the 2019 season, the Coulee Conference was dissolved as a football entity, with schools dispersed to the South Central Conference (Black River Falls and Gale-Ettrick-Trempealeau), Southwest Wisconsin Activities League (Luther) and Southwest Wisconsin Conference (Arcadia, Viroqua and Westby). Around this time, the WIAA and Wisconsin Football Coaches Association collaborated on a massive realignment of Wisconsin's high school football conferences to be reviewed on a two-year competition cycle. The initial 2020-2021 alignment revived the Coulee Conference for football, with five full members (Arcadia, Black River Falls, Gale-Ettrick-Trempealeau, Viroqua and Westby) joining associate members Altoona (Cloverbelt) and Aquinas (Mississippi Valley) to round out the seven-member group. For the 2022-2023 cycle, the Coulee Conference was expanded to eight football-playing members with the return of West Salem from the Mississippi Valley Conference. Luther rejoined the Coulee Conference for the 2024-2025 realignment, replacing Altoona after their shift to the Middle Border Conference. This alignment will remain in place through at least the 2026-2027 competition cycle.

== List of member schools ==
=== Current members ===
School	Location	Affiliation	Enrollment	Mascot	Colors	Joined
Arcadia	Arcadia, WI	Public	411	Raiders		1965
Black River Falls	Black River Falls, WI	Public	453	Tigers		1977
Gale-Ettrick-Trempealeau	Galesville, WI	Public	380	Red Hawks		1971
Luther	Onalaska, WI	Private (Lutheran, WELS)	270	Knights		1997
Viroqua (Note: Joining the Southwest Wisconsin Conference for the 2027-28 school year)	Viroqua, WI	Public	329	Blackhawks		1987
West Salem	West Salem, WI	Public	563	Panthers		1926
Westby	Westby, WI	Public	301	Norsemen		1977

=== Current associate members ===
School	Location	Affiliation	Mascot	Colors	Primary Conference	Sport(s)
Aquinas	La Crosse, WI	Private (Catholic)	Blugolds		Mississippi Valley	Football
Assumption	Wisconsin Rapids, WI	Private (Catholic)	Royals		Marawood	Girls Tennis
Cochrane-Fountain City	Fountain City, WI	Public	Pirates		Dairyland	Girls Golf
Hillsboro	Hillsboro, WI	Public	Tigers		Scenic Bluffs	Boys Golf (Note: Co-operative with Royall)
Mauston	Mauston, WI	Public	Golden Eagles		South Central	Boys Tennis, Girls Tennis

=== Former members ===
School	Location	Affiliation	Mascot	Colors	Joined	Left	Conference Joined	Current Conference
Bangor	Bangor, WI	Public	Cardinals		1926	1977	Scenic Central	Scenic Bluffs
Cochrane-Fountain City	Fountain City, WI	Public	Pirates		1971	1977	Dairyland	
Gale-Ettrick	Galesville, WI	Public	Redmen		1949	1971	Closed (merged into G-E-T)	
Galesville	Galesville, WI	Public	Galloping Gales		1926	1949	Closed (merged into Gale-Ettrick)	
Holmen	Holmen, WI	Public	Vikings		1926	1989	Mississippi Valley	
La Crescent	La Crescent, MN	Public	Lancers		1980	2007	Hiawatha Valley (MSHSL)	Three Rivers (MSHSL)
Melrose	Melrose, WI	Public	Eagles		1942	1965	Closed (merged into Melrose-Mindoro)	
Melrose-Mindoro	Melrose, WI	Public	Mustangs		1965	1977	Dairyland	
Mindoro	Mindoro, WI	Public	Tigers		1926	1965	Closed (merged into Melrose-Mindoro)	
Onalaska	Onalaska, WI	Public	Hilltoppers		1926	1989	Mississippi Valley	
Royall	Elroy, WI	Public	Panthers		1977	1979	Scenic Bluffs	
Trempealeau	Trempealeau, WI	Public	Bears		1936	1971	Closed (merged into G-E-T)	

=== Former football-only members ===
School	Location	Affiliation	Mascot	Colors	Seasons	Primary Conference
Altoona	Altoona, WI	Public	Railroaders		2020-2023	Cloverbelt, Middle Border

== Membership map ==
Coulee Conference
Location of Coulee Conference full members:
1 Arcadia
2 Black River Falls
3 Gale-Ettrick-Trempealeau
4 Luther
5 Viroqua
6 West Salem
7 Westby

== Sponsored sports ==
	Baseball	Boys Basketball	Girls Basketball	Boys Cross Country	Girls Cross Country	Football	Boys Golf	Girls Golf	Gymnastics	Softball	Boys Tennis	Girls Tennis	Boys Track & Field	Girls Track & Field	Girls Volleyball	Boys Wrestling	Girls Wrestling
Arcadia	●	●	●	●	●	●	●	●		●			●	●	●	●	●
Black River Falls	●	●	●	●	●	●	●	●		●	●	●	●	●	●	● (Note: Co-operative with Alma Center Lincoln)	●
Gale-Ettrick-Trempealeau	●	●	●	●	●	●	●	●	● (Note: Co-operative with Arcadia)	●			●	●	●	● (Note: Co-operative with Melrose-Mindoro)	●
Luther	●	●	●	●	●	●	●			●		●	●	●	●	●	
Viroqua	●	● (Note: Co-operative with Youth Initiative)	●	●	●	●				●	●	●	●	●	●	●	●
West Salem	●	●	●	●	●	●	●		● (Note: Co-operative with Aquinas and Bangor)	●	●	●	●	●	●	● (Note: Co-operative with Bangor)	●
Westby	●	●	●	●	●	●	● (Note: Co-operative with Viroqua)	●	● (Note: Co-operative with Cashton, De Soto and Viroqua)	●			●	●	●	●	●

== List of state championships ==
=== Fall sports ===
Football
School	Year	Division
Westby	1978	Division 4
Westby	1985	Division 4
Westby	1986	Division 4
West Salem	2007	Division 4
Aquinas	2021	Division 5
Aquinas	2022	Division 5
Aquinas	2023	Division 5

=== Winter sports ===
Boys Basketball
School	Year	Division
Onalaska	1988	Class A
Luther	2023	Division 4

Gymnastics
School	Year	Division
Onalaska	1985	Class B

=== Spring sports ===
Baseball
School	Year	Division
West Salem	2017	Division 2

Boys Golf
School	Year	Division
Onalaska	1982	
Gale-Ettrick-Trempealeau	1994	Division 2
Arcadia	2010	Division 3

Softball
School	Year	Division
Arcadia	2014	Division 3

Boys Track & Field
School	Year	Division
Arcadia	1991	Division 3
Arcadia	1992	Division 3
Arcadia	1994	Division 3
Arcadia	1995	Division 3
Arcadia	1998	Division 3
Arcadia	1999	Division 3
Arcadia	2004	Division 3

Girls Track & Field
School	Year	Division
West Salem	1979	Class C
Arcadia	1998	Division 3
Arcadia	2003	Division 3
Arcadia	2004	Division 3
West Salem	2007	Division 2
Arcadia	2008	Division 2
Arcadia	2009	Division 3

=== Summer sports ===
Baseball
School	Year
Trempealeau	1968

== List of conference championships ==
=== Boys Basketball ===
School	Quantity	Years
Onalaska	18	1927, 1929, 1933, 1938, 1939, 1940, 1961, 1968, 1969, 1971, 1979, 1983, 1984, 1985, 1986, 1987, 1988, 1989
Gale-Ettrick-Trempealeau	15	1972, 1977, 1978, 1983, 1990, 2002, 2010, 2011, 2012, 2013, 2014, 2015, 2016, 2017, 2019
West Salem	14	1934, 1944, 1945, 1954, 1955, 1958, 1980, 2000, 2020, 2022, 2023, 2024, 2025, 2026
Holmen	13	1932, 1935, 1937, 1939, 1944, 1946, 1949, 1950, 1953, 1960, 1964, 1965, 1973
Bangor	8	1930, 1931, 1936, 1941, 1956, 1962, 1966, 1970
Galesville	8	1928, 1934, 1942, 1943, 1946, 1947, 1948, 1949
Arcadia	7	1972, 1981, 1982, 1989, 2007, 2008, 2010
Westby	7	1991, 1996, 1997, 2001, 2004, 2006, 2010
Black River Falls	6	1980, 2002, 2003, 2005, 2009, 2018
La Crescent	6	1983, 1992, 1993, 1998, 1999, 2002
Gale-Ettrick	5	1951, 1952, 1955, 1957, 1963
Luther	3	2013, 2019, 2021
Viroqua	3	1994, 1995, 2009
Melrose-Mindoro	2	1974, 1975
Trempealeau	2	1959, 1967
Cochrane-Fountain City	0	
Melrose	0	
Mindoro	0	
Royall	0	

=== Girls Basketball ===
School	Quantity	Years
West Salem	28	1979, 1983, 1988, 1994, 1995, 1996, 1997, 1998, 1999, 2000, 2001, 2002, 2003, 2004, 2005, 2006, 2007, 2009, 2010, 2013, 2016, 2017, 2021, 2022, 2023, 2024, 2025, 2026
Arcadia	11	1977, 1980, 1981, 1982, 1983, 1987, 2003, 2013, 2014, 2020, 2026
Black River Falls	5	1978, 1990, 1991, 1994, 2003
Gale-Ettrick-Trempealeau	5	2015, 2016, 2017, 2018, 2019
Onalaska	5	1979, 1984, 1985, 1986, 1989
Luther	3	2006, 2008, 2026
Viroqua	3	1993, 1998, 2026
Westby	2	2011, 2012
La Crescent	1	1992
Bangor	0	
Cochrane-Fountain City	0	
Holmen	0	
Melrose-Mindoro	0	
Royall	0	

=== Football ===
School	Quantity	Years
Westby	16	1978, 1983, 1984, 1985, 1986, 1987, 1988, 1989, 1990, 1991, 1996, 1997, 1999, 2000, 2011, 2018
Arcadia	15	1967, 1973, 1974, 1975, 1976, 1977, 1979, 1980, 1981, 1985, 2010, 2013, 2014, 2015, 2021-Alt
Black River Falls	14	1979, 1983, 1988, 1992, 1993, 1994, 1995, 2001, 2002, 2005, 2006, 2009, 2010, 2012
Gale-Ettrick-Trempealeau	12	1971, 1972, 1976, 1981, 1982, 2001, 2003, 2004, 2008, 2009, 2016, 2017
Gale-Ettrick	8	1961, 1962, 1963, 1964, 1966, 1968, 1969, 1970
West Salem	8	1991, 2001, 2004, 2006, 2007, 2011, 2022, 2026
Aquinas	5	2020, 2021, 2023, 2024, 2025
Onalaska	4	1959, 1960, 1976, 1980
Holmen	2	1965, 1979
Cochrane-Fountain City	1	1974
La Crescent	1	1998
Melrose-Mindoro	1	1974
Viroqua	1	1997
Altoona	0	
Bangor	0	
Luther	0	
Melrose	0	
Mindoro	0	
Royall	0	
Trempealeau	0	

== Vernon County Mega Bowl ==
Beginning in 2019, the Westby Norsemen and the Viroqua Blackhawks have played for the Vernon County Mega Bowl in their yearly football contest. The Norsemen won the first Mega Bowl game 21-8 in 2019. There was no Mega Bowl Game in 2020.

Westby victories	Viroqua victories	Tie games

No.	Date	Location	Winning team		Losing team	
1	October 18, 2019	Viroqua	Westby	21	Viroqua	8
2	September 3, 2021	Westby	Westby	46	Viroqua	0
3	September 9, 2022	Viroqua	Westby	47	Viroqua	15
4	September 8, 2023	Westby	Westby	35	Viroqua	7

No.	Date	Location	Winning team		Losing team	
5	September 20, 2024	Westby	Westby	16	Viroqua	14
6	September 19, 2025	Viroqua	Westby	30	Viroqua	6
7	September 17, 2026	Viroqua	Westby	26	Viroqua	6
Series: Westby leads 7–0
