= Gale-Ettrick-Trempealeau High School =

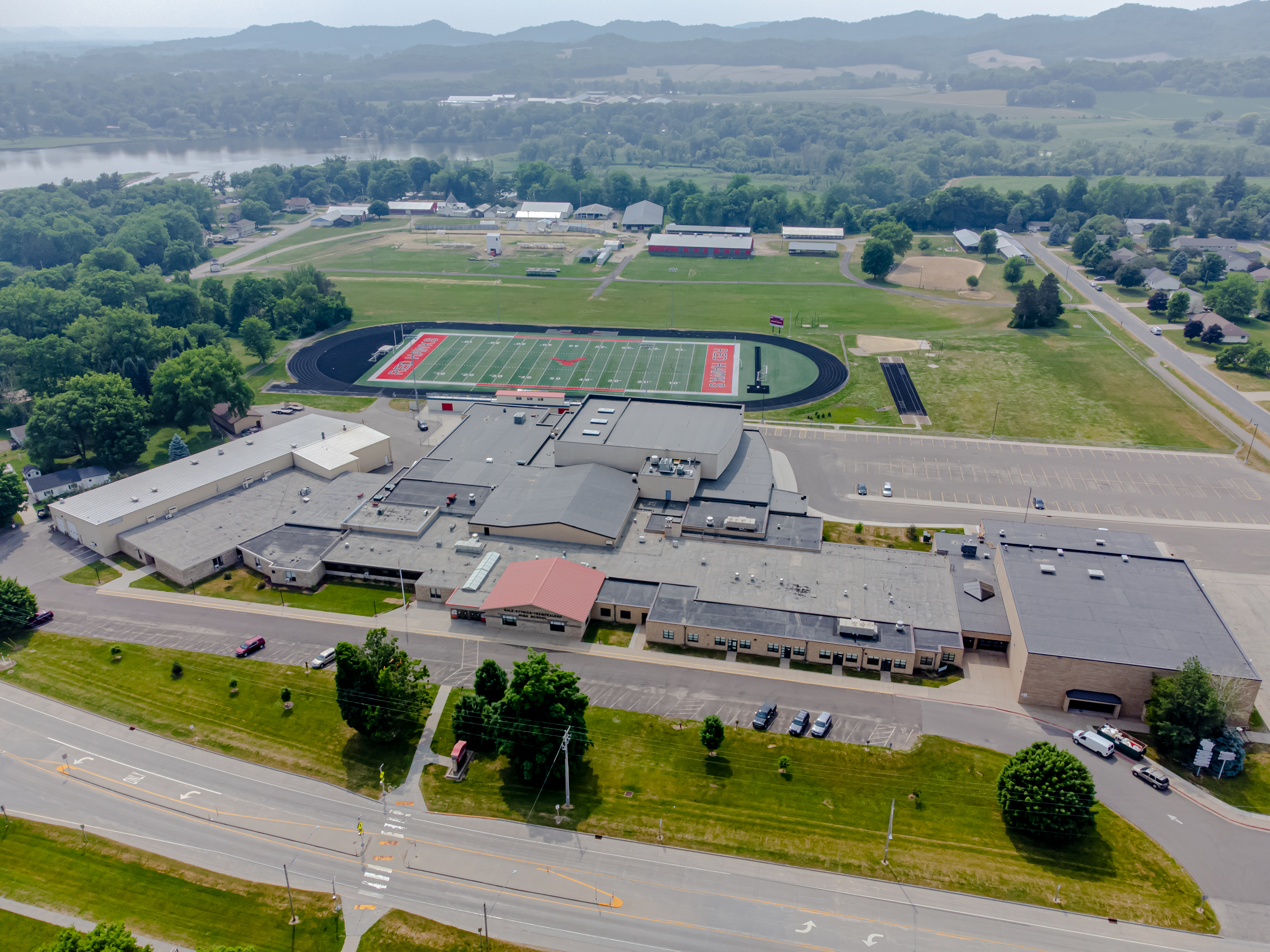

Location
- 17511 Main Street; Galesville, Wisconsin 54630; United States; 44.093794°N 91.343179°W

Information
- Type: Public secondary school
- Established: 1902
- Status: In session
- Closed: Summer months(depends)
- School district: Gale-Ettrick-Trempealeau School District
- Principal: Jamie Oliver
- Teaching staff: 31.36 (FTE)
- Grades: 9-12
- Enrollment: 415 (2023-2024)
- Student to teacher ratio: 13.23
- Color
- Athletics: Track, Trap, Band, and Choir
- Athletics conference: Coulee Conference
- Mascot: Red hawk
- Nickname: Red Hawks
- Rival: Blair
- Website: hs.getschools.org/o/hs

Gale-Ettrick-Trempealeau High School (abbreviated as G-E-T, and formerly Galesville High School and Gale-Ettrick High School) is a public high school in Galesville, Wisconsin. It educates students in grades 9 through 12 and is the only high school in the Gale-Ettrick-Trempealeau School District.

== History ==
A high school in the city of Galesville, Wisconsin opened in 1902. Trempealeau County government ordered the creation of a joint school district covering Galesville, Ettrick, Gale, the town of Ettrick and the town of Trempealeau at the beginning of 1949, to take effect on June 30, 1949. An influx of new students created an overcrowding condition at the school; a 1951 referendum for a new building failed. A 1952 referendum passed. Construction for the then-Gale-Ettrick High School commenced in September 1953. In 1971, Healy Memorial High School in Trempealeau was consolidated into the Gale-Ettrick, and the school was renamed Gale-Ettrick-Trempealeau.

The school went away from its Redmen nickname for athletic teams in May 2010; a new name of Red Hawks was later chosen.

== Academics ==
Advanced Placement classes are offered at Gale-Ettrick-Trempealeau.

== Athletics ==
The Red Hawk athletic teams compete in the Coulee Conference. The boys golf team won a Division Two state championship in 1994.

=== Athletic conference affiliation history ===
==== Galesville ====
- Coulee Conference (1926-1949)

==== Trempealeau ====
- Coulee Conference (1936-1971)

==== Gale-Ettrick ====
- Coulee Conference (1949-1971)

==== Gale-Ettrick-Trempealeau ====
- Coulee Conference (1971–present)

== Performing arts ==
G-E-T has two competitive a cappella groups, "Vocal Point" and "Out of the Blue." Vocal Point took third place in the 2017 International Championship of High School A Cappella Finals.

== Notable alumni ==
- Todd Auer, football player
- Suzanne Jeskewitz, politician
