= Church of the Lutheran Confession =

Lutheran denomination

- Synod Logo
- Classification: Lutheran
- Orientation: Confessional Lutheran
- Theology: Old Lutheran repristination of Lutheran Orthodoxy
- Polity: Congregational
- Associations: Eglise Lutherienne de Confession du Congo · Crown of Glory Lutheran Church (in Ghana) · The Church of the Lutheran Confession of India · The Berea Evangelical Lutheran Church (in India) · The Church of the Lutheran Confession of Kenya Etago · Church of the Lutheran Confession of Myanmar · Himalayan Church of the Lutheran Confession (in Nepal) · The Nigerian Church of the Lutheran Confession · The Church of the Lutheran Confession of East Africa · Eglise Evangelique Lutherienne de Confession du Togo
- Region: 24 States within the United States and various missions
- Founder: Paul Albrecht, former District President of the Dakota-Montana district of the WELS
- Origin: 1960; Sleepy Eye, Minnesota.
- Separated from: mainly the Wisconsin Evangelical Lutheran Synod
- Separations: The Lutheran Church of East Africa (in Tanzania) · Lutheran Conference of Confessional Fellowship
- Congregations: 85
- Members: 8,631 baptized Foreign mission churches total about 50,000 baptized

The Church of the Lutheran Confession (CLC) is a conservative Christian religious body theologically adhering to confessional Lutheran doctrine. Founded in 1960 in Minnesota, it has approximately 85 congregations in 24 U.S. states, and missions in Canada, India, Africa, Nepal, and Myanmar.

The CLC maintains its headquarters at its ministerial college; Immanuel Lutheran High School, College & Seminary in Eau Claire, Wisconsin.

== Historical background ==
Various Lutheran congregations left their synods during the 1950s and were independent at first. They began meeting together in 1957. The Church of the Lutheran Confession (CLC) was formed around the time of the break-up of the Evangelical Lutheran Synodical Conference of North America in 1963.

The CLC was created primarily (though not solely) from congregations that broke away from the Wisconsin Evangelical Lutheran Synod (WELS) and the Evangelical Lutheran Synod (ELS) because of a doctrinal difference in the matter of church fellowship. The CLC maintained that the WELS and ELS did not follow scriptural principles (Romans 16:17-18) when they did not break with the Synodical Conference and the Lutheran Church–Missouri Synod after they had publicly recognized doctrinal error within those bodies .

While there were joint talks in the 1990s between the CLC and the WELS and ELS to resolve the dispute, no resolution was reached. More recently, the CLC has been in formal discussions with the WELS and ELS over doctrinal issues. The goal of these discussions has been to establish doctrinal unity. In 2015, the "Joint Statement Regarding the Termination of Fellowship" was drafted by those involved in the discussions. However, the 2017 CLC General Pastoral Conference recommended that the 2018 CLC Convention not adopt the "Joint Statement" as a resolution of the doctrinal difference in this matter, since it is unclear and contains some ambiguities.

== Beliefs and practice ==
=== Core beliefs ===
The CLC teaches that the Bible is the only authoritative source for doctrine. It subscribes to the Lutheran Confessions (the Book of Concord, 1580) as an accurate presentation of what Scripture teaches. It is strongly linked to the concept of sola scriptura—scripture alone, and its website states, "If it is not Scripture; it is not Lutheran."

=== Ecumenical relations ===
Fellowship between the CLC and other church groups is established only upon investigation and confirmation that both church groups hold complete unity in scriptural doctrine and practice.

The CLC is currently in fellowship with several worldwide synods, some founded through mission work by the CLC.

== Publishing and publications ==
The CLC Bookhouse is the official publishing house for the CLC. It is devoted to publishing Christian literature and CLC related religious materials, as well as several CLC periodicals. The CLC Bookhouse also offers books and items from other publishing houses.

CLC periodicals include:

- The Lutheran Spokesman — the CLC's monthly family magazine
- Ministry by Mail — printed and online sermons for CLC members at a distance from their church
- The Journal of Theology — a quarterly theological magazine
- The Witness — an e-newsletter

CLC educational materials include:

- God's Hand in our Lives — the CLC Sunday School Series
- Learn From Me — an adult instruction manual

== Presidents ==
- Paul Albrecht 1961–1972
- Robert Reim 1972–1974
- Egbert Albrecht 1974–1982
- Daniel Fleischer 1982–2002
- John Schierenbeck 2002–2012
- Michael Eichstadt 2012–2023
- Michael Wilke 2023–present
