= West Salem High School (Wisconsin) =

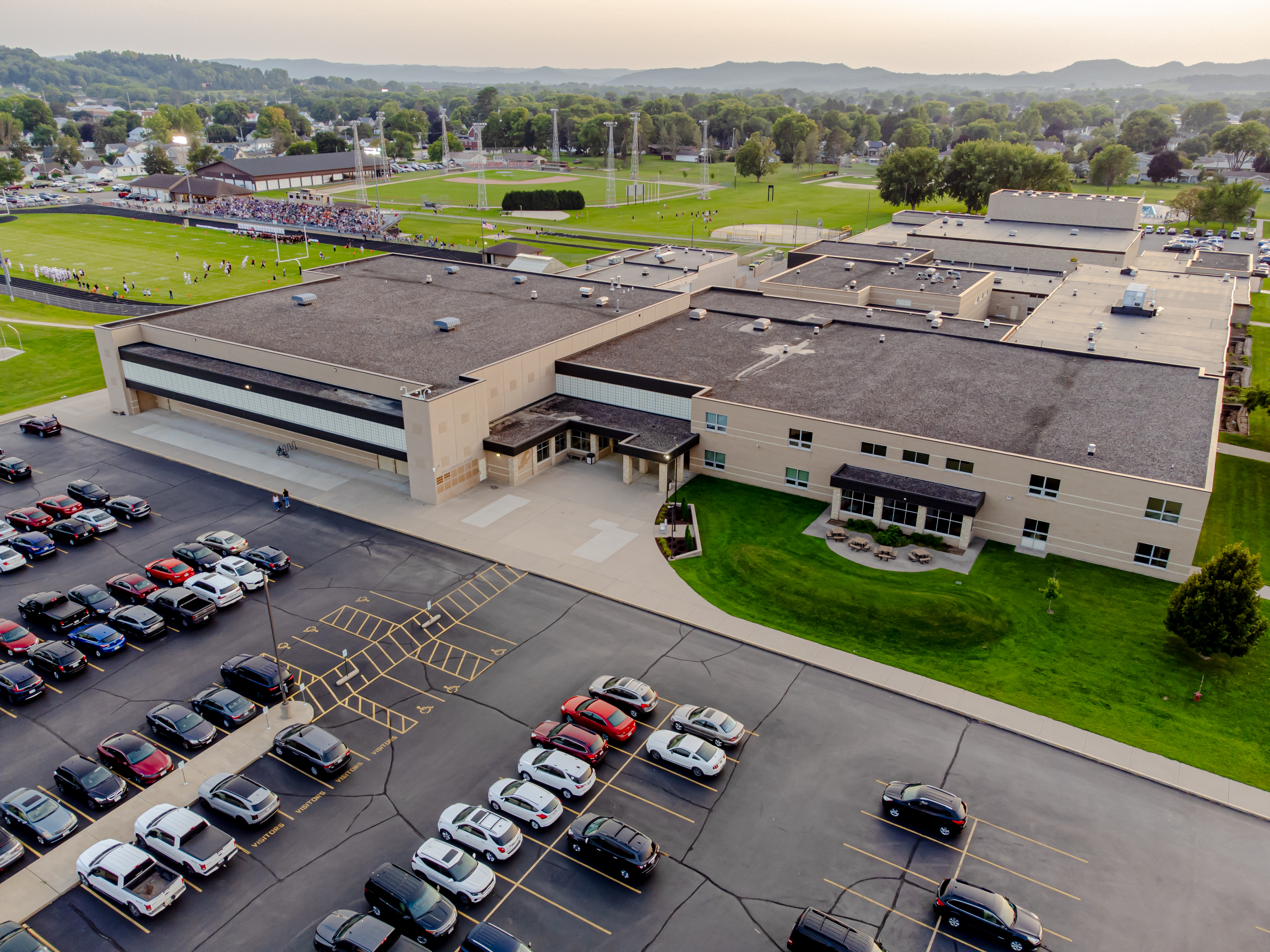

Location
- 490 North Mark Street; West Salem, Wisconsin 54669; United States; 43.90337°N 91.07714°W

Information
- Type: Public 4-year
- Motto: First Class
- Principal: Justin Jehn
- Staff: 44.70 (FTE)
- Enrollment: 605 (2022-2023)
- Student to teacher ratio: 13.53
- Colors: Orange and black
- Mascot: Panther
- Website: West Salem High School

West Salem High School is a high school located in West Salem, Wisconsin, part of the West Salem School District. As of 2023-2024, 600 students were enrolled at West Salem High School. The school employs a faculty of 70 individuals, 79% of whom have a master's degree or higher. Students have the opportunity to receive credits to the nearby University of Wisconsin–La Crosse through dual-credit courses offered.

== Athletics ==
West Salem's athletic nickname is the Panthers, and they have been members of the Coulee Conference since it was founded in 1926. West Salem competes in the Wisconsin Interscholastic Athletic Association (WIAA), winning four state titles across three different sports.

WIAA state champion titles:

- Baseball: 2017
- Football: 2007
- Girls Track & Field: 1979, 2007

== Notable alumni ==
- Tom Black, NBA player
- David Garbers, scientist
- Admiral Jay L. Johnson, retired United States Navy officer and 26th Chief of Naval Operations (CNO).
- Damian Miller, MLB catcher
- Arthur H. Parmelee, football coach and physician
- Darin Wagner, creator of the superhero comic book "Hyper-Actives," published by Alias Enterprises.

== Gallery ==
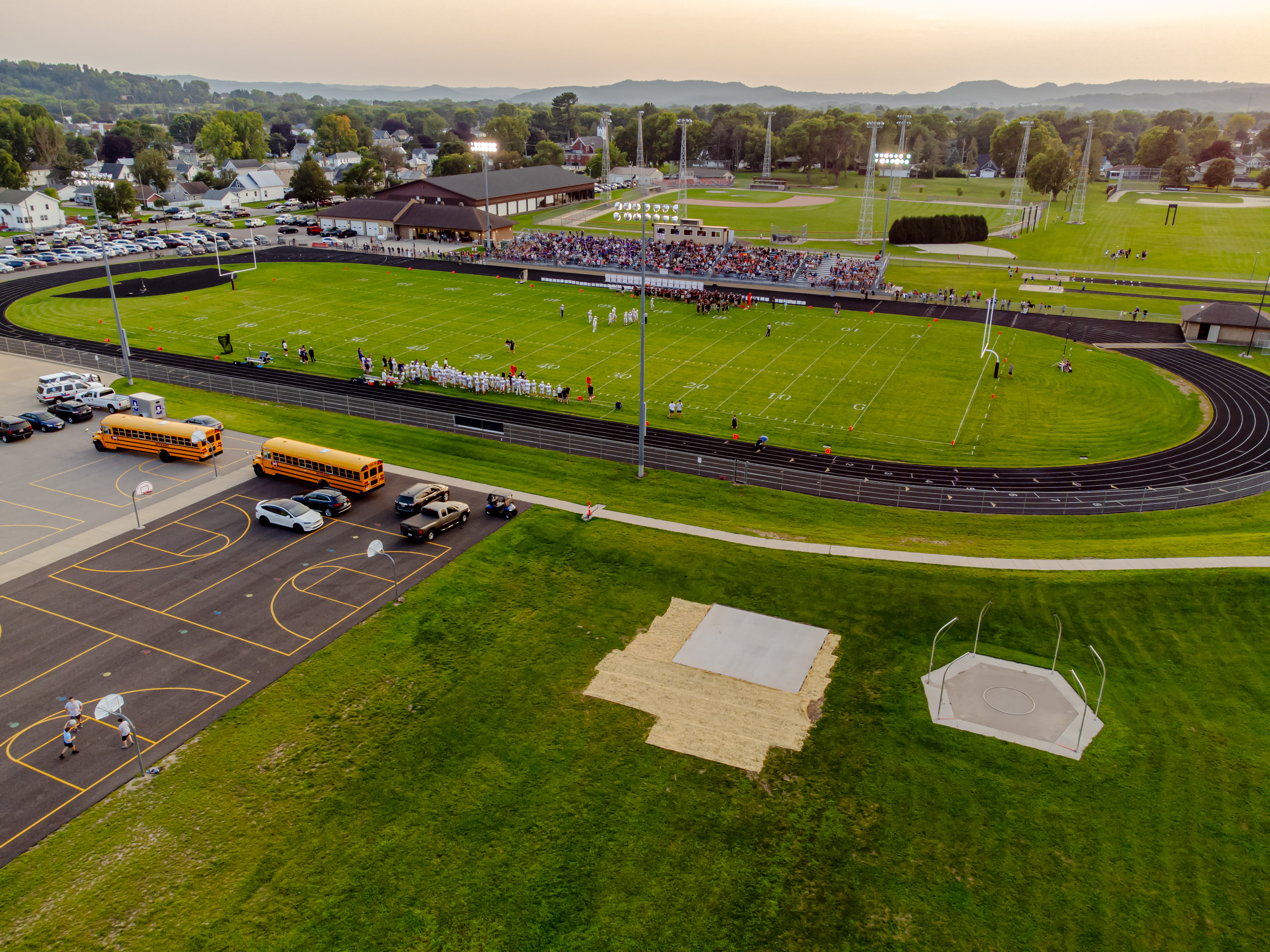
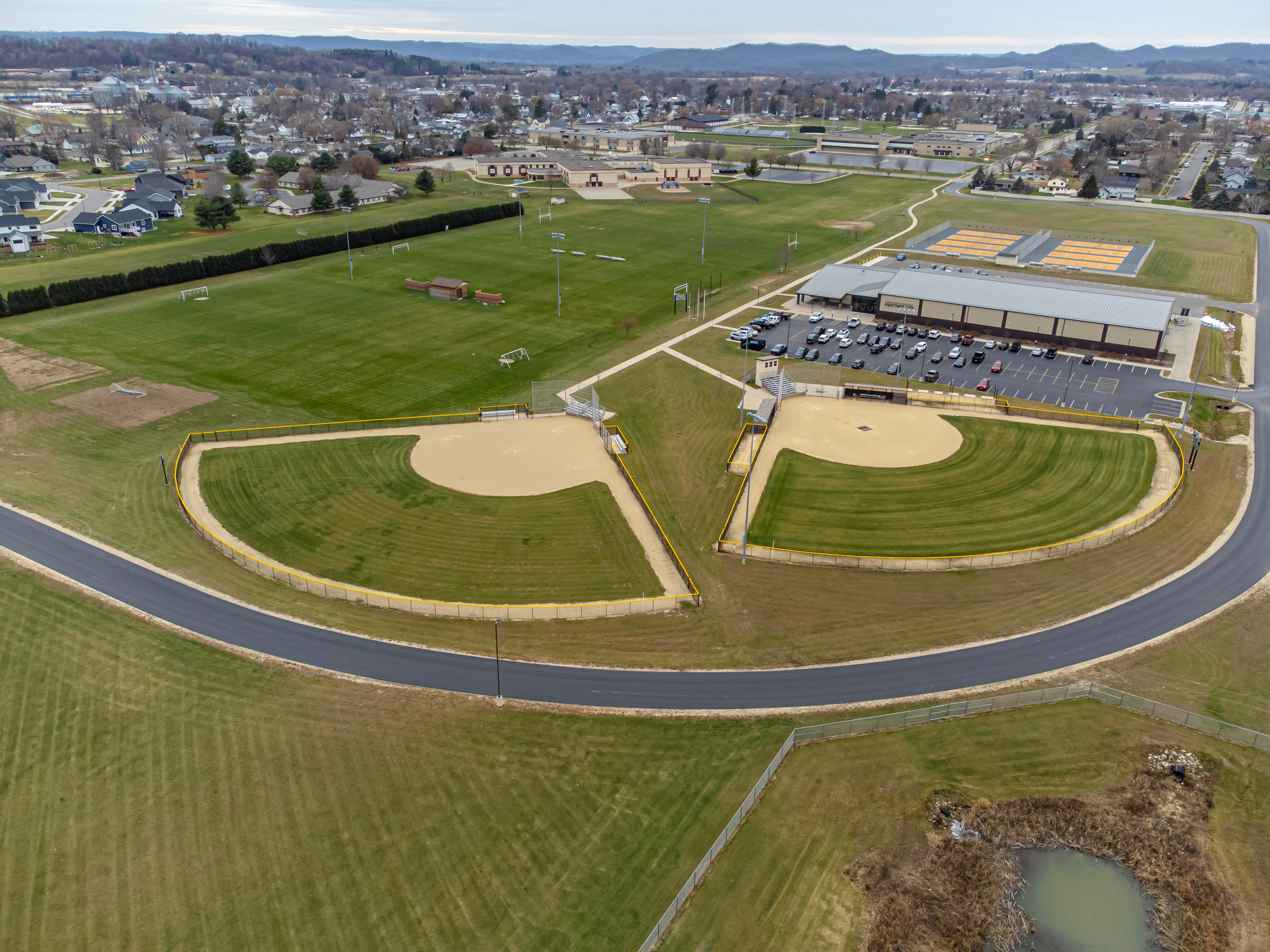
West Salem athletic fields

== See also ==
- La Crosse Central High School
- La Crosse Logan High School
- Aquinas High School
- Onalaska High School
- Holmen High School
