= Augusta, Wisconsin =

- City
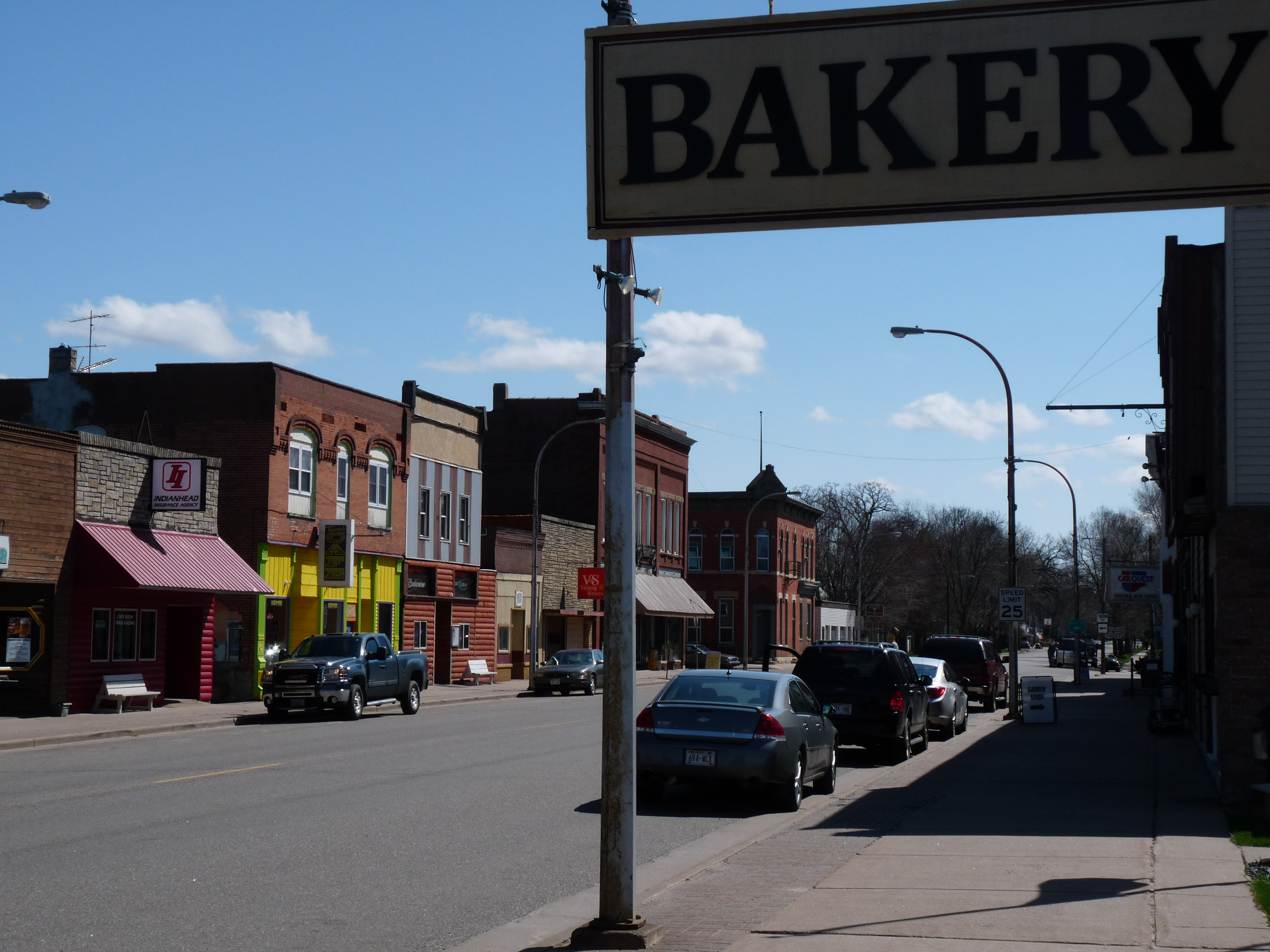
- Downtown, looking east on Lincoln

- Location of Augusta in Eau Claire County, Wisconsin.

- Location within Wisconsin Location within the United States
- Coordinates: 44°40′47″N 91°7′22″W
- Country: United States
- State: Wisconsin
- County: Eau Claire
- Named after: Augusta, Maine

Area
  - Total: 2.21 sq mi (5.72 km^{2})
  - Land: 2.21 sq mi (5.72 km^{2})
  - Water: 0 sq mi (0.00 km^{2})
- Elevation: 961 ft (293 m)

Population (2020)
  - Total: 1,567
  - Density: 710/sq mi (274/km^{2})
- Time zone: UTC-6 (Central (CST))
  - Summer (DST): UTC-5 (CDT)
- ZIP Code: 54722
- Area codes: 715 & 534
- FIPS code: 55-03825
- GNIS feature ID: 1561013
- Website: cityofaugusta.org

Augusta is a city in Eau Claire County, Wisconsin, United States. The population was 1,567 at the 2020 census, up from 1,550 at the 2010 census. The city is bordered by the Town of Bridge Creek.

== History ==
Augusta was formerly called Ridge Creek. A post office has been in operation in Augusta since 1858. The city was named in 1856 after Augusta, Maine. Another theory holds that the town was named Augusta after citizens agreed to name the village after the prettiest girl in the area.

== Geography ==
Augusta is located at 44°40′47″N 91°7′22″W (44.679656, -91.122664).

According to the United States Census Bureau, the city has a total area of 2.19 square miles (5.67 km^{2}), all land.

There are two class 2 trout fishing streams in Augusta: Bridge Creek and its tributary Diamond Valley Creek.

The city lies on US Highway 12, which serves as the main east-west thoroughfare through town, and also lies on State Trunk Highway 27. It is ten miles north of Interstate 94 and 20 miles southeast of the City of Eau Claire.

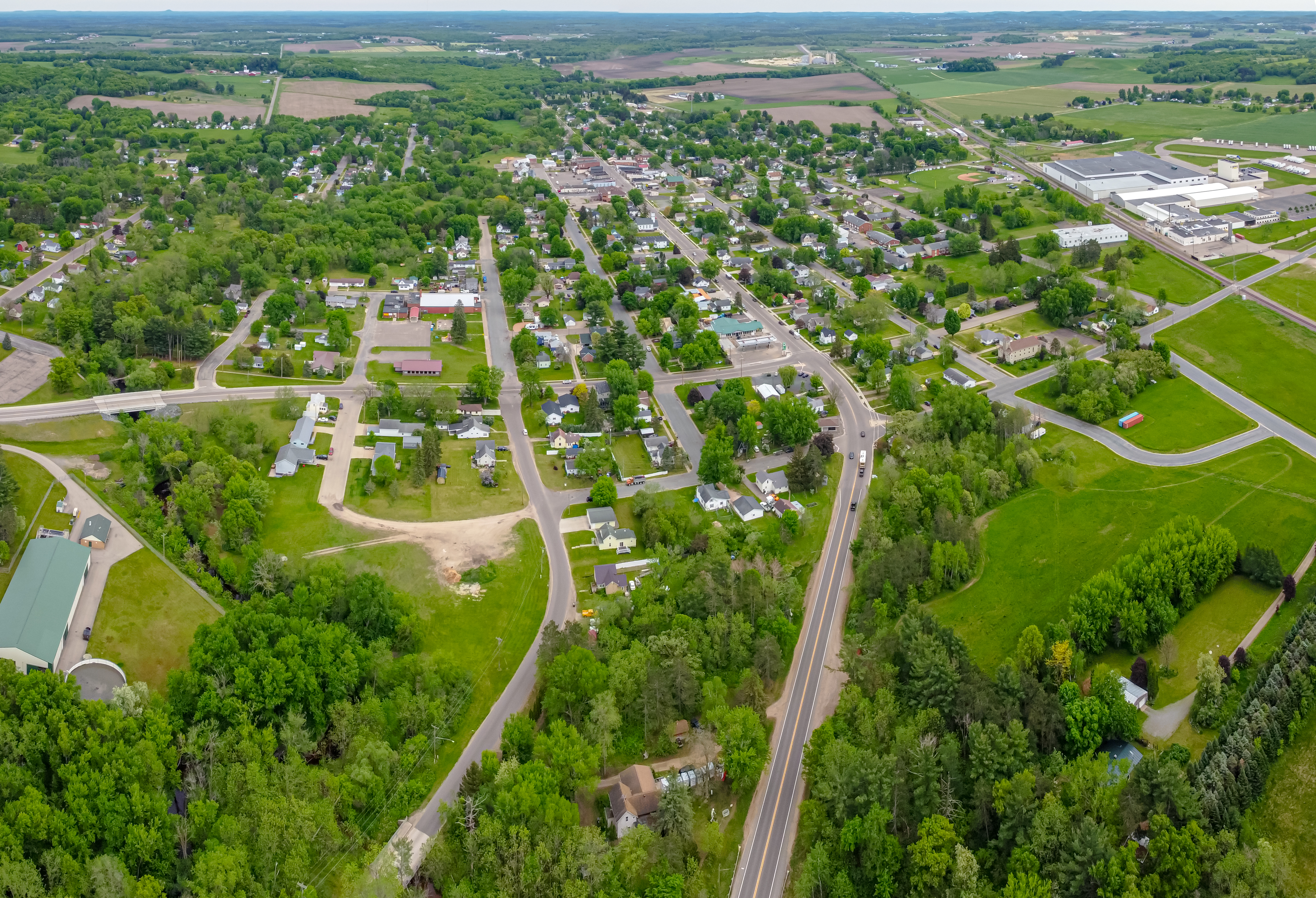
US-12/Wis-27 run through town

== Demographics ==
Historical population
Census	Pop.	Note	%±
1870	761		—
1880	1,116		46.6%
1890	1,187		6.4%
1900	1,256		5.8%
1910	1,405		11.9%
1920	1,407		0.1%
1930	1,359		−3.4%
1940	1,519		11.8%
1950	1,458		−4.0%
1960	1,338		−8.2%
1970	1,242		−7.2%
1980	1,560		25.6%
1990	1,510		−3.2%
2000	1,460		−3.3%
2010	1,550		6.2%
2020	1,567		1.1%
U.S. Decennial Census

=== 2020 census ===
As of the 2020 census, Augusta had a population of 1,567. The median age was 40.8 years. 23.3% of residents were under the age of 18 and 23.0% of residents were 65 years of age or older. For every 100 females there were 100.9 males, and for every 100 females age 18 and over there were 94.8 males age 18 and over.

0.0% of residents lived in urban areas, while 100.0% lived in rural areas.

There were 613 households in Augusta, of which 28.9% had children under the age of 18 living in them. Of all households, 41.4% were married-couple households, 24.8% were households with a male householder and no spouse or partner present, and 26.9% were households with a female householder and no spouse or partner present. About 36.3% of all households were made up of individuals and 15.7% had someone living alone who was 65 years of age or older.

There were 657 housing units, of which 6.7% were vacant. The homeowner vacancy rate was 0.0% and the rental vacancy rate was 4.7%.

Racial composition as of the 2020 census
Race	Number	Percent
White	1,458	93.0%
Black or African American	9	0.6%
American Indian and Alaska Native	14	0.9%
Asian	6	0.4%
Native Hawaiian and Other Pacific Islander	0	0.0%
Some other race	20	1.3%
Two or more races	60	3.8%
Hispanic or Latino (of any race)	51	3.3%

=== 2010 census ===
As of the census of 2010, there were 1,550 people, 614 households, and 384 families residing in the city. The population density was 707.8 inhabitants per square mile (273.3/km^{2}). There were 662 housing units at an average density of 302.3 per square mile (116.7/km^{2}). The racial makeup of the city was 97.7% White, 0.3% African American, 0.4% Native American, 0.2% from other races, and 1.5% from two or more races. Hispanic or Latino of any race were 3.1% of the population.

There were 614 households, of which 32.2% had children under the age of 18 living with them, 45.6% were married couples living together, 10.1% had a female householder with no husband present, 6.8% had a male householder with no wife present, and 37.5% were non-families. 31.6% of all households were made up of individuals, and 14.5% had someone living alone who was 65 years of age or older. The average household size was 2.43 and the average family size was 3.05.

The median age in the city was 39.9 years. 25.2% of residents were under the age of 18; 6.7% were between the ages of 18 and 24; 24% were from 25 to 44; 24% were from 45 to 64; and 20% were 65 years of age or older. The gender makeup of the city was 48.9% male and 51.1% female.

=== 2000 census ===
As of the census of 2000, there were 1,460 people, 599 households, and 376 families residing in the city. The population density was 721.5 people per square mile (279.1/km^{2}). There were 632 housing units at an average density of 312.3 per square mile (120.8/km^{2}). The racial makeup of the city was 96.58% White, 0.41% African American, 2.05% Native American, 0.07% Asian, 0.21% from other races, and 0.68% from two or more races. Hispanic or Latino of any race were 1.30% of the population.

There were 599 households, out of which 29.0% had children under the age of 18 living with them, 47.6% were married couples living together, 11.7% had a female householder with no husband present, and 37.2% were non-families. 32.9% of all households were made up of individuals, and 21.5% had someone living alone who was 65 years of age or older. The average household size was 2.36 and the average family size was 3.01.

In the city, the population was spread out, with 25.0% under the age of 18, 7.5% from 18 to 24, 24.5% from 25 to 44, 20.1% from 45 to 64, and 22.9% who were 65 years of age or older. The median age was 40 years. For every 100 females, there were 84.3 males. For every 100 females age 18 and over, there were 82.5 males.

The median income for a household in the city was $28,478, and the median income for a family was $37,500. Males had a median income of $31,023 versus $19,226 for females. The per capita income for the city was $15,469. About 10.1% of families and 11.0% of the population were below the poverty line, including 13.4% of those under age 18 and 7.3% of those age 65 or over.

== Education ==
Augusta High School is the local public high school.

== Events ==
Each year, Augusta celebrates Independence Day and the founding of the town with a "Bean and Bacon Days" celebration. The festival includes a parade and street fair. The celebration was first established with that name in 1977 by the Augusta Business Association and the Lions Club. The annual sponsor of the celebration is Bush Brothers and Company.

== Notable people ==
- Ira B. Bradford, Wisconsin State Representative; lived in Augusta
- George Caldwell, Wisconsin State Representative; lived in Augusta
- Dan Devine, former head coach of the Green Bay Packers and the Notre Dame Fighting Irish; born in Augusta
- Davis A. Donnelly, Wisconsin State Senator; born in Augusta
- Oscar Finch, Wisconsin State Representative; Mayor of Augusta
- Charles F. Hanke, Wisconsin State Representative; member of the Augusta city council
- Lester Johnson, U.S. Representative; died in Augusta
- Bernard H. Raether, Wisconsin State Representative; Chairman, Clerk and Assessor of Augusta
