= International Coenzyme Q10 Association =

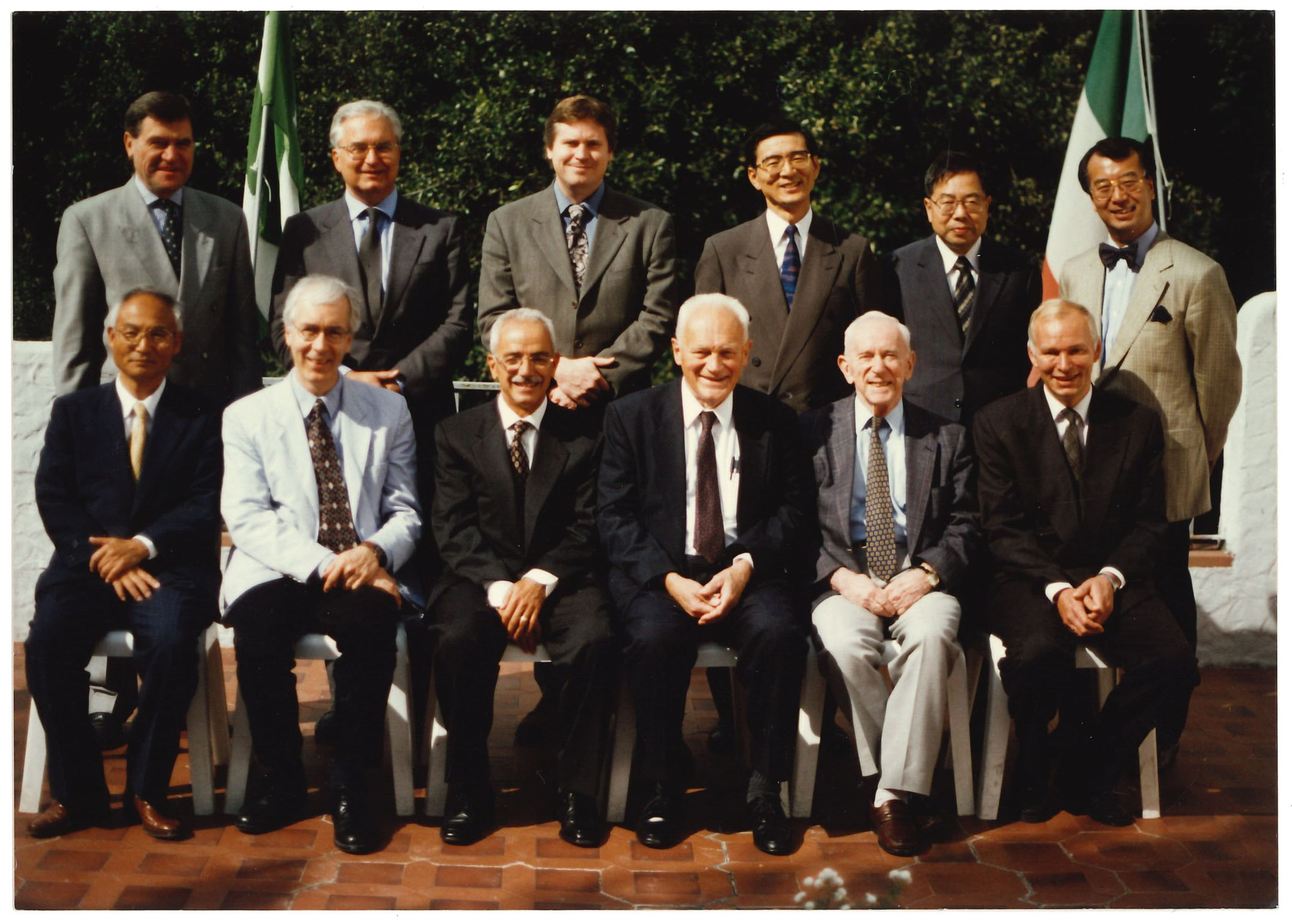

The International Coenzyme Q10 Association is a nonprofit association originally based in Ancona, Italy and currently in Cordoba, Spain. Since its establishment in 1997, it has promoted biochemical and clinical research on Coenzyme Q10 in an attempt to increase the body of knowledge about the preventive and therapeutic health effects of this important metabolic and antioxidant compound.

Coenzyme Q molecules are naturally occurring lipid-soluble redox molecules. In humans, they are found in the form of Coenzyme Q10. The most common source of industrially produced Coenzyme Q10 is a yeast fermentation process.

Coenzyme Q is a redox compound that cycles between a oxidized form ubiquinone, and a reduced form ubiquinol. Ubiquinol transfers electrons to other molecules to reduce them or to block the production of free radicals whereas it is oxidized back to ubiquinone. Further, the antioxidant cycle is maintained through the activity of some enzymes that transfer electrons from NAD(P)H to ubiquinone reducing it to ubiquinol.

Coenzyme Q is essential to the process of mitochondrial bioenergetics. It plays a decisive role in the production of ATP energy. But it is also essential in the protection of cell membranes against oxidation preventing lipoperoxidation and also ferroptosis.

Coenzyme Q10 also regenerates alpha-tocopherol, the active form of vitamin E. Together with vitamin E, Coenzyme Q10 protects lipoproteins from oxidative damage. Research has shown that Coenzyme Q10 supplementation helps to counteract endothelial dysfunction and has anti-inflammatory effects. As such, Coenzyme Q10 supports good cardiovascular function.

== History ==
In 1996, on the occasion of the Ninth International Symposium on Biomedical and Clinical Aspects of Coenzyme Q in Ancona, Italy, Karl Folkers, the chemist who had determined the structure of the Coenzyme Q10 molecule together with Fred Crane, laid the plans for the founding of the International Coenzyme Q10 Association. Folkers was assisted in the planning by Gian Paulo Littarru, Ancona, Italy; Svend Aage Mortensen, Copenhagen, Denmark; Sven Moesgaard, Vejle, Denmark; and representatives of Kaneka Nutrients, all of whom were also attending the symposium in Ancona, Italy.

The plans called for the formation of a board consisting of leading Coenzyme Q10 researchers and a secretariat associated with the chairman of the board. The purpose of the new association was to promote and disseminate biological and clinical studies of Coenzyme Q10.

The first supporting partners of the International Coenzyme Q10 Association were Kaneka Nutrients, Japan, and Pharma Nord, Denmark. In 2020, the current supporting members are MSE Pharmazeutika GmbH, Nutrisan Nutraceuticals, Indena and Cienporcien Natural.

The following Coenzyme Q10 researchers became the first board members: Gian Paulo Littarru (Chairman), Karl Folkers (Life Trustee), Svend Aage Mortensen (Vice chairman), Fred L. Crane (Vice chairman), Franz Enzmann, Takeo Kishi, Giorgio Lenaz, Anthony Linnane, Magnus Nylander, and Sven Moesgaard.

== Structure and activities ==
As the first chairman of the association, Gian Paulo Littarru established a secretariat in Ancona, Italy. When in 2013, Plácido Navas succeeded Gian Paulo Littarru as the chairman, he kept the secretariat in Ancona.

Moesgaard and Karl Folkers listed the following main purposes for the newly founded International Coenzyme Q10 Association:

- To establish a forum for the exchange of information about Coenzyme Q10 research and to coordinate cooperation among leading world experts in the field of research in Coenzyme Q10.
- To monitor the total field of Coenzyme Q10 research in a database.
- To keep track of all major Coenzyme Q10 research projects on a volunteer reporting basis.
- To offer advice on Coenzyme Q10 researchers with respect to study protocols, data collection, and data analysis.
- To initiate research needed on a large scale to substantiate current uses and new uses of Coenzyme Q10.
- To offer scientific know-how and advice to universities, governmental organizations, companies, and the public in the field of Coenzyme Q10.
- To counteract health-scare issues and false statements about Coenzyme Q10 in the media.
- To issue scientific information about Coenzyme Q10 on request and in the form of journal articles.
- To plan and conduct international scientific symposia in the field of Coenzyme Q10.

== By-Laws ==
In 1996, Karl Folkers and the planning group drafted the original by-laws for the founding of the association. The by-laws had then to be amended to conform to Italian law, as the association was headquartered in Ancona, Italy.

The current statutes, as last revised in Kobe, Japan, on 25 March 2014, can be found at https://icq10a.com/board-members/statutes-of-the-association/.

== Chairperson ==
From 1997 to 2013, Gian-Paulo Littarru, Polytechnic University of Marche, Ancona, Italy, served as chairman of the association.

From 2013 until September 2022, Plácido Navas, Pablo de Olavide University, Sevilla, Spain, has been the chairman.

From September 2022, Guillermo López Lluch (Pablo de Olavide University, Sevilla, Spain, is the chairman.

== Board members ==
The following Coenzyme Q10 scholars are currently board members of the association (2023): Steen Larsen (University of Copenhage, Denmark) Vicepresident, Kerstin Elisabet Brismar (Karolinska Institutet, Sweden), Catherine F. Clarke (UCLA Department of Chemistry & Biochemistry, USA), Maria Luisa Genova (University of Bologna, Italy), Iain Hargreaver (Liverpool John Moores University, UK), Keiichi Higuchi (Shinshu University, Japan), Makoto Kawamukai (Shimane University, Japan), Guillermo López Lluch (Pablo de Olavide University, Spain), Catarina M. Quinzii (Columbia University, NY, USA), Franklin Rosenfeldt (Swinburne University, Australia), Leonardo Salviati (Padova University, Italy), Luca Tiano (Polytechnic University of Marche, Italy), and Alice M. Zemljic-Harpf (University of California, San Diego, USA).

The association's by-laws provide for three types of membership: regular membership, student membership, and supporting membership.

== International conferences of the ICQA ==
The conference proceedings of the international conferences held by the International Coenzyme Q10 Association:

- The 1st Conference of the International Coenzyme Q10 Association, Boston, USA, 1998. BioFactors. 1999;9(2-4):81-384.
- The 2nd Conference of the International Coenzyme Q10 Association, Frankfurt, Germany, 2000. Free Radical Research. 2002;36(4):365-490.
- The 3rd Conference of the International Coenzyme Q10 Association, London, UK, 2002. BioFactors. 2003;18(1-4):3-322.
- The 4th Conference of the International Coenzyme Q10 Association, Los Angeles, USA, 2005. BioFactors. 2005;25(1-4):3-270.
- The 5th Conference of the International Coenzyme Q10 Association, Kobe, Japan, 2007. BioFactors. 2008;32(1-4):1-283.
- The 6th Conference of the International Coenzyme Q10 Association Brussels, Belgium, 2010. BioFactors. 2011;37(5):329-398.
- The 7th Conference of the International Coenzyme Q10 Association Sevilla, Spain, 2012. The Seventh Conference of the International Coenzyme Q10 Association: Programme and Abstracts. Sevilla, 2012.
- The 8th Conference of the International Coenzyme Q10 Association Bologna, Italy, 2015. The Eighth Conference of the International Coenzyme Q10 Association: Programme and Abstracts. Bologna, 2015.
- The 9th Conference of the International Coenzyme Q10 Association New York, USA, 2018. The Ninth Conference of the International Coenzyme Q10 Association: Programme and Abstracts. New York, 2018.
- The 10th Conference of the International Coenzyme Q10 Association Beiersdorf, Hamburg, Germany, 2022. The Tenth Conference of the International Coenzyme Q10 Association: Programme and Abstracts. Hamburg, Germany, 2022.
- The 11th Conference of the International Coenzyme Q10 Association. Copenhagen, Denmark. "Unveiling the essential role of Coenzyme Q10 in health". 16th-19th June, 2025. The Eleventh Conference of the International Coenzyme Q10 Association: Programme and Abstracts. Copenhagen, Denmark, 2025.

== Earlier International Symposia on the Biomedical and Clinical Aspects of Coenzyme Q ==
- The 1st International Symposium on Coenzyme Q, Lake Yamanaka, Japan, 1976. Biomedical and Clinical Aspects of Coenzyme Q, Vol 1. Amsterdam: Elsevier, 1977.
- The 2nd International Symposium on Coenzyme Q, Tokyo, Japan, 1979. Biomedical and Clinical Aspects of Coenzyme Q, Vol. 2. Amsterdam: Elsevier, 1980.
- The 3rd International Symposium on Coenzyme Q, Austin, Texas, USA, 1981. Biomedical and Clinical Aspects of Coenzyme Q, Volume 3. Amsterdam: Elsevier, 1981.
- The 4th International Symposium on Coenzyme Q, Martinsried, Munich, Germany, 1983. Biomedical and Clinical Aspects of Coenzyme Q: Vol. 4. Amsterdam: Elsevier, 1984.
- The 5th International Symposium on the Biomedical and Clinical Aspects of Coenzyme Q, Tokyo, Japan, 1985. Biomedical and Clinical Aspects of Coenzyme Q, volume 5. Amsterdam: Elsevier, 1986.
- The 6th International Symposium on the Biomedical and Clinical Aspects of Coenzyme Q, Rome, Italy, 1990. Biomedical and Clinical Aspects of Coenzyme Q, volume 6. Amsterdam: Elsevier, 1991.
- The 7th International Symposium on the Biomedical and Clinical Aspects of Coenzyme Q, Copenhagen, Denmark, 1992. The Clinical Investigator. 1993;71(Supp):s51-s176.
- The 8th International Symposium on the Biomedical and Clinical Aspects of Coenzyme Q, Stockholm, Sweden, 1993. Molecular Aspects of Medicine. 1994;15(Supp):s1-s294.
- The 9th International Symposium on the Biomedical and Clinical Aspects of Coenzyme Q, Ancona, Italy, 1996. Molecular Aspects of Medicine. 1997;18(Supp):s1-s309.

== Research publications ==
It is not possible to list all of the Coenzyme Q10 research projects that Littarru and Navas, as chairmen of the International Coenzyme Q10 Association, have encouraged and supported. Herewith a selection.

=== Aging and Coenzyme Q10 ===
In 2020, Navas and the association arranged for the publication of a compendium of articles on the subject of Coenzyme Q in Aging. The articles show the importance of Coenzyme Q10 in the progression of aging and in aging-related diseases. Coenzyme Q10 is an essential factor involved in two main aspects of cell function: bioenergetics and antioxidant protection. The chapters in the book present current knowledge on the bio-synthesis of Coenzyme Q10, the nature of CoQ10 deficiency, and the results of clinical trials based on CoQ10 supplementation.

=== Bioavailability of Coenzyme Q10 ===
Navas, López-Lluch and a team of researchers conducted a double-blind crossover study of the bioavailability of seven different Coenzyme Q10 formulations over a 48-hour period after ingestion of 100 mg. The researchers measured the Cmax and the area under the curve for each CoQ10 formulation in 14 healthy volunteers. They used a four-week washout period between the administration of each formulation.

The study results showed that a ubiquinone Coenzyme Q10 formulation produced with a patented heating and cooling crystal dissolution process had a 48-hour area under the curve that was approximately four times greater than the corresponding area under the curve for a ubiquinone CoQ10 formulation not subjected to the same process. Similarly, the 48-hour area under the curve for a ubiquinol formulation was only 52% of the area under the curve for the patented ubiquinone CoQ10 formulation. The study illustrated that the formulation of the CoQ10 supplement is more important for absorption and bioavailability than the form is, i.e. whether ubiquinone or ubiquinol.

=== Cardiovascular disease and Coenzyme Q10 ===
Littarru was a co-author on the Mortensen Q-Symbio Study of the effect of adjunctive Coenzyme Q10 treatment on morbidity and mortality in chronic heart failure patients. The study showed that daily supplementation with 3 x 100 mg for two years significantly improved the survival and symptoms compared to placebo treatment.

In the European sub-population of the Q-Symbio Study, researchers found significantly fewer major cardiovascular adverse effects, significantly reduced risk of all-cause and cardiovascular mortality, significantly reduced NYHA classification, and significantly reduced left ventricular ejection fraction.

The KiSel-10 Study evaluated the effect of combined Coenzyme Q10 (2 x 100 mg) and selenium-enriched yeast (1 x 200 microg) daily for four years on the risk of heart disease in community living senior citizens. Compared to placebo, the combined Coenzyme Q10 and selenium treatment significantly reduced the risk of heart disease, improved heart function, and improved health-related quality of life. The beneficial effects of the supplementation persisted through the 12th year of follow-up. The researchers attributed the positive effects of the supplementation to the reduction of oxidative stress, systemic inflammation, and fibrosis.

Littarru was the lead author on a review of the effect of Coenzyme Q10 on endothelial dysfunction in ischemic heart disease. Compared with placebo, Coenzyme Q10 supplementation improved endothelial dysfunction in statin-treated type 2 diabetic patients. The average improvement in endothelium-dependent relaxation was six times greater in patients with plasma Coenzyme Q10 levels higher than 2.4 microg/mL as compared to patients with plasma Coenzyme Q10 levels below 2.4 microg/mL.

=== Physical activity and Coenzyme Q10 ===
In 2014, Navas and López-Lluch reported research results that showed that physical activity affects plasma Coenzyme Q10 levels differently in young and old humans. In young people, more strenuous physical activity was correlated with lower plasma CoQ10 levels; in older adults, greater physical activity was related to higher plasma CoQ10 levels and higher Coenzyme Q10 to cholesterol ratios. The higher plasma CoQ10 levels were associated with lower lipid peroxidation and lower oxidized LDL levels in elderly people.

In a second study, the researchers showed that elderly people with higher levels of functional capacity had higher levels of plasma Coenzyme Q10 as well as lower plasma levels of cholesterol and lipid peroxidation. Elderly people with greater physical capacity had higher ratios of Coenzyme Q10 to cholesterol and Coenzyme Q10 to LDL lipoproteins.

Safety of Coenzyme Q10

The association supported work on a review of the safety profile of Coenzyme Q10 based on animal and human data. Coenzyme Q10 has low toxicity and does not induce serious adverse effects in humans. Clinical trial data indicates that the observed safety level for Coenzyme Q10 intakes is 1200 mg/day/person. Exogenous Coenzyme Q10 does not influence the biosynthesis of endogenous Coenzyme Q10; Coenzyme Q10 does not accumulate in plasma or tissues after the cessation of supplementation. The data from preclinical and clinical studies indicate that Coenzyme Q10 is highly safe for use as a nutritional supplement.
