= Svend Aage Mortensen =

Danish cardiologist (1942–2015)

Svend Aage Mortensen, M.D., Sc.D. (31 August 1942 – 22 April 2015) was a Danish cardiologist at Rigshospitalet in Copenhagen, Denmark. Rigshospitalet was until February 2017 the largest hospital in Denmark; only surpassed by Skejby Sygehus, however, Rigshospitalet is a flagship in the Danish health care system. From 1990 until his death in 2015, Mortensen was the medical director of the heart transplantation unit at Rigshospitalet. He was a fellow of the European Society of Cardiologists. Mortensen is best known as the chief researcher and the leading author for the Q-Symbio study of the "Effect of Coenzyme Q10 on Morbidity and Mortality in Chronic Heart Failure."

== Coenzyme Q10 Research ==
Mortensen was one of the first researchers, along with Dr. Gian-Paulo Littarru, Dr. Per Langsjoen, and Dr. William V. Judy, to work with Dr. Karl Folkers, who urged more research into the use of Coenzyme Q10 as an adjuvant treatment for heart failure patients. The early collaboration with Dr. Folkers led to the development of a study protocol for the Q-Symbio Study.

The Q-Symbio study was a multi-center, randomized, double-blind, placebo-controlled study that investigated the effectiveness of adjunctive treatment of chronic heart failure patients with daily Coenzyme Q10 supplements in the ubiquinone form. The patients took 300 milligrams of Coenzyme Q10 (100 milligrams three times daily, with meals) or matching placebos for two years.

The results from the Q-Symbio study showed significantly improved symptoms and survival for the patients taking the active Coenzyme Q10 treatment together with their conventional heart failure medications.

== Multiple treatment options with Coenzyme Q10 ==
As a cardiologist, Mortensen saw multiple treatment options with Coenzyme Q10 in cardiovascular disease:

- As a prophylactic treatment in statin therapy
- As an adjunctive treatment of ischemic heart disease and angina pectoris
- As a pretreatment for coronary artery bypass surgery or valve surgery
- As an adjunctive treatment in arterial hypertension
- As a prophylactic treatment in anthracycline therapy
- As an adjunctive treatment in chronic heart failure

== New guidelines for the management of heart failure ==
Following the publication of the results of the Q-Symbio study, Mortensen urged that the American College of Cardiology/American Heart Association guidelines for the management of heart failure be revised to include adjunctive treatment with the natural substance Coenzyme Q10.

He summarized the case for Coenzyme Q10 as an adjunctive treatment for heart failure:

- Safety: no serious side effects recorded in randomized controlled trials (RCT)s
- Interactions: no definite drug interactions reported
- Efficacy:
  - RCTs: reduced hospitalizations and reduced mortality for heart failure patients
  - Meta-analyses of RCTs: improved left ventricular ejection fraction and improved NYHA class
- Formulations: best bio-availability of the Coenzyme Q10 when it is dissolved in vegetable oil and administered in capsules manufactured under pharmaceutical quality control

== Coenzyme Q10 and the "energy starved heart" ==
Mortensen's research prior to the Q-Symbio study had convinced him of the importance of adequate Coenzyme Q10 for the heart muscle cells:

- He knew that there is an inverse correlation between the concentrations of Coenzyme Q10 in the heart muscle tissue and the severity of heart failure.
- He suspected that energy starvation of the myocardium (the "energy starved heart") is a dominant feature of heart failure; his research efforts were focused on finding a well-tolerated agent (Coenzyme Q10) to improve the energy and force of the heart muscle.
- He liked the safe and positive way in which Coenzyme Q10 adjunctive treatment improved heart function; Coenzyme Q10 as a medication did not block any neurohormonal responses in the heart. Instead, Coenzyme Q10 naturally enhanced the process of producing energy in the heart muscle cells.
- He was aware that statin medications inhibit not only the bio-synthesis of cholesterol but also the bio-synthesis of Coenzyme Q10, thereby reducing the level of Coenzyme Q10 in the blood and in the heart muscle tissue.

== Concern for heart failure patients ==
Mortensen's highest concern was the welfare of his heart failure patients and heart transplantation patients. He knew that heart failure is a disabling disease that diminishes the quality of life of the patients. It is a disease with an increasing prevalence. It is a disease that continues to have a poor prognosis even though advances have been made in various drug and medical device therapies.

Mortensen's research established Coenzyme Q10 adjunctive treatment as a way to improve heart failure outcomes and break the metabolic vicious cycle in the heart muscle.
