= Plácido Navas Lloret =

Spanish Professor of Cell Biology

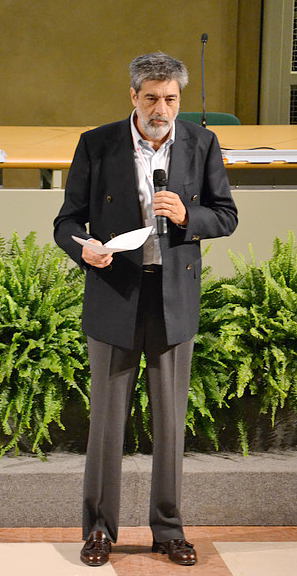
Plácido Navas Lloret in Bologna

Plácido Navas Lloret (born 5 October 1952) is a Spanish Professor of Cell Biology in the Andalusian Center for Developmental Biology at the Pablo de Olavide University in Sevilla, Spain. From 2002 to 2012, Professor Navas served as a board member of the International Coenzyme Q10 Association; since 2013, he has been the chairman of the association.

Professor Navas' primary research interests include Coenzyme Q biosynthesis and biological functions, Coenzyme Q10 deficiency, plasma membrane structure and function, oxidative stress, lipophilic antioxidants, aging processes, and the mitochondria.

== Early education and career ==
Professor Navas earned his Master of Science degree in biology in 1976 and his Ph.D. in cell biology in 1978, both at the University of Sevilla.

During the period 1977 – 1984, Professor Navas worked as associate professor at the University of Córdoba and the University of Sevilla.

== Fulbright Fellowship ==
From 1984 to 1986, he was a postdoctoral Fulbright Fellowship scholar at Purdue University in West Lafayette, Indiana, where he studied and worked with Professor D. James Morré and Professor Fred L. Crane, the researcher who had discovered Coenzyme Q10 at the Institute of Enzyme Research, University of Wisconsin, in 1957.

== Academic positions ==
In the period from 1987 to 1997, Professor Navas served at the University of Córdoba alternately as Head of the Cell Biology Department and as Vice-Chancellor for Research.

From 1997 to 2001, he served as Vice-president for Research at the Pablo de Olavide University in Sevilla.

From 1995 to 2000, he also served as adjunct professor in the Department of Nutrition Science at Purdue University.

As a professor of cell biology at the Pablo de Olavide University in Sevilla, Professor Navas has conducted and published research studies on the biological functions and clinical effects of Coenzyme Q10. He has supervised over 20 Ph.D. dissertations.

== Research on Coenzyme Q10 ==
Bioavailability of Coenzyme Q10 Preparations

In 2019, Professor Navas, together with his colleague at the Pablo de Olavide University Professor Guillermo López-Lluch and a team of researchers, conducted a double-blind crossover study of seven different supplement formulations containing 100 mg of Coenzyme Q10 in 14 healthy young individuals. They measured bioavailability was measured as area under the curve of plasma CoQ10 levels over 48 hours following ingestion of a single dose. The measurements were repeated in the same group of 14 volunteers with a four-week washout between intakes.

The bioavailability study results showed statistically significant differences in the bioavailability of the various formulations. The ubiquinone formulation with the best bioavailability had a Cmax and an area under the curve nearly double that of the ubiquinol formulation. The ubiquinol formulation outperformed other less well-formulated ubiquinone formulations. These study results indicated that the formulation of the Coenzyme Q10 supplement is more important for absorption and bioavailability than the form (ubiquinone vs ubiquinol) of the supplement is.

The bioavailability study also showed considerable variation in the participants' capacity to achieve an increase of Coenzyme Q10 in blood from a supplement.

Coenzyme Q10 and Aging

In 2020, Professor Navas wrote the lead chapter in the book Coenzyme Q in Aging, edited by Professor López-Lluch. Professor Navas emphasized the main functions of Coenzyme Q10 as an electron carrier in respiratory chain and as an antioxidant in the regulation of mitochondrial function and insulin sensitivity in the aging process. He pointed out that the complete Coenzyme Q10 bio-synthesis pathway and the adaptation of Coenzyme Q10 to different pathological conditions to guarantee cell survival need further research.

In 2018, Professors Navas and López-Lluch and colleagues published a review of the published results from clinical trials based on Coenzyme Q10 supplementation and aging. They found evidence that the supplementation positively affects mitochondrial deficiency syndrome and the symptoms of aging. The effect is achieved primarily through improvements in cellular bio-energetics. The antioxidant effect of Coenzyme Q10 alleviates systemic inflammation and improves the symptoms and survival of heart failure patients. Numerous published reports suggest that combining Coenzyme Q10 supplementation with statin medication could prevent the side effects resulting from statin treatment.

In their review article, Professors Navas and López-Lluch summarized the outcomes of the Q-Symbio Study and the KiSel-10 Study.

The Q-Symbio Study was a randomized controlled trial investigating the effect of Coenzyme Q10 adjuvant treatment on morbidity and mortality in chronic heart failure: a 2-year treatment with Coenzyme Q10 in the ubiquinone form (3 times 100 mg/day) demonstrated significant improvement in the survival and symptoms as well as a significant reduction in major cardiovascular events in chronic heart failure patients.

The KiSel-10 Study was a randomized controlled trial of the effects of long-term treatment with Coenzyme Q10 as ubiquinone (2 times 100 mg/day) plus selenium (200 microg as selenized yeast) in a healthy elderly population (average age: 78 years). The study results revealed a significant reduction in cardiovascular mortality not only during the 4-year treatment period but also 12 years later, compared to those taking a placebo.

Coenzyme Q10 and Physical Activity

In 2014, Professor Navas and colleagues published two papers on Coenzyme Q10 and physical activity. In the one paper, they reported that they had measured the levels of Coenzyme Q10 and cholesterol in the plasma of young and old individuals with differing degrees of physical activity. Their results indicated that plasma Coenzyme Q10 levels in old people are higher than the levels found in young people. However, they found differing relationships between Coenzyme Q10 levels and physical activity depending on the age of individuals.

In young people, higher physical activity correlated with lower Coenzyme Q10 levels in plasma; in older adults, higher activity was associated with higher plasma Q10 levels and higher Coenzyme Q10/Cholesterol ratios.

The higher Coenzyme Q10 levels in plasma were associated with lower levels of lipid-peroxidation and oxidized LDL in the elderly people. The study results indicated that physical activity in the senior years can improve antioxidant capacity in plasma and thus possibly reduce the risk of heart disease.

In a second 2014 paper, Professor Navas and colleagues studied a cohort of healthy community-living senior citizens. They tested the volunteers on handgrip strength, six-minute walk, Number of chair stands, and time up and go. They found that individuals with higher levels of functional capacity also had lower levels of cholesterol and lipid peroxidation as well as higher levels of Coenzyme Q10 in plasma.

The study results showed that higher levels of functional capacity were associated with higher levels of Coenzyme Q10 and with lower levels of a bio-marker for oxidative stress (malondialdehyde) in the blood of community-living elderly people. The study results suggested that both aerobic and strength exercise are necessary for senior citizens.

In a 2018 study, Professor Navas and his fellow researchers investigated the relationship of plasma Coenzyme Q10 levels of elite athletes – professional soccer players in the Spanish Liga 1 – to the levels of known bio-markers for muscle damage (creatine kinase), kidney damage (uric acid), and stress damage (cortisol). Their findings suggested that high levels of plasma Coenzyme Q10 can prevent muscle damage, improve kidney function, and contribute to higher performance in professional soccer players.

Coenzyme Q10 Deficiency

Coenzyme Q10 deficiency disorders are classified as primary Coenzyme Q10 deficiency – caused by mutations in the genes that code for Coenzyme Q10 bio-synthesis – and secondary Coenzyme Q10 deficiency – caused by mutations in genes not related to Coenzyme Q10 bio-synthesis of by other non-genetic factors. Primary Coenzyme Q10 deficiency disorders are rare. Secondary Coenzyme Q10 deficiencies, both those related to genetic causes and those related to environmental conditions, are the main causes of biochemical Coenzyme Q10 deficiency. It has not been possible to link most of the cases of Coenzyme Q10 deficiency to a specific genetic diagnosis. Moreover, the pathogenesis of Coenzyme Q10 deficiency cannot be attributed solely to defects in the process of cellular bio-energetics. Early recognition of Coenzyme Q10 deficiency is necessary to avoid irreversible tissue damage by instituting timely and appropriate treatment.

In addition, many studies have shown reduced levels of Coenzyme Q10 in aging individuals and in individuals with other non-hereditary diseases.

Coenzyme Q10 and Autism

In a 2014 paper, Professors Crane, Navas, and Gvozdjáková report on the results of a pilot study investigating the effect of Coenzyme Q10 supplement in the ubiquinol form on 24 autistic children aged 3 to 6 years (17 boys, 7 girls). The researchers administered daily doses of 50 mg of a liquid ubiquinol diluted in milk, tea, or juice to the children during the first week of the study. In week 2, they increased the daily dose to 2 times 50 mg in separate doses. They treated the children with 2 times 50 mg ubiquinol for three months. For ethical reasons, the researchers did not have a placebo control group in the study.

The mean total Coenzyme Q10 level in blood increased 489% from the baseline level to the 3-month post-supplementation level. The researchers observed a significant improvement in the symptoms of autism after 3 months of ubiquinol supplementation in the children who maintained a total Coenzyme Q10 plasma concentration at or over 2.5 micromol/L (= 2.16 micrograms/mL).

The improvement in the symptoms of autism in percentage of children were in the areas of communication (12% of the children), verbal communication (21%), playing games (42%), sleeping (34%), and food acceptance (17%). Supplementation with ubiquinol, the reduced form of Coenzyme Q10, produced favorable responses in children with autism. Professors Crane, Navas, and Gvozdjáková hypothesized that autism is controlled by a Coenzyme Q-dependent redox system in the porin channels; the mechanism still needs to be established.

Reduction of Coenzyme Q10 and Antioxidant Activity

Coenzyme Q10 molecules are redox molecules. They have the capacity to accept and donate electrons. In the cells, Coenzyme Q10 molecules are found in three different redox states: oxidized (ubiquinone), semi-oxidized (semiubiquinone), and reduced (ubiquinol).

Reduced Coenzyme Q10 prevents lipid peroxidation in liposomes and plasma membranes. Coenzyme Q is reduced by the dehydrogenase enzymes NADH-cytochrome b5 reductase and NAD(P)H:quinone reductase 1. Reduced Coenzyme Q10 prevents lipid peroxidation chain reaction.

In a 1997 study, Professor Navas and a team of researchers found that cytochrome b5 reductase maintains Coenzyme Q10 and ascorbate in their reduced state to support their antioxidant activity. Thus, Coenzyme Q10 and ascorbate acting as antioxidants at the plasma membrane represent a first-line barrier protecting lipids from oxidative stress and subsequent apoptosis.
