= European Heart Rhythm Association score of atrial fibrillation =

Classification system of atrial fibrillation

The European Heart Rhythm Association score of atrial fibrillation (or EHRA score) is a classification system for the extent of atrial fibrillation. It places patients in one of four categories based on how much they are limited during physical activity; the limitations/symptoms are in regard to normal breathing and varying degrees in shortness of breath and/or angina.

EHRA Class	Symptoms
I	No symptoms.
II	Mild symptoms; normal daily activity not affected.
III	Severe symptoms; normal daily activity affected.
IV	Disabling symptoms; normal daily activity discontinued.

The classification system is named after the European Heart Rhythm Association.

== See also ==
- Canadian Cardiovascular Society grading of angina pectoris
- CHA2DS2–VASc score
- HAS-BLED
- Management of atrial fibrillation
- New York Heart Association Functional Classification
