= Holmen, Wisconsin =

- City
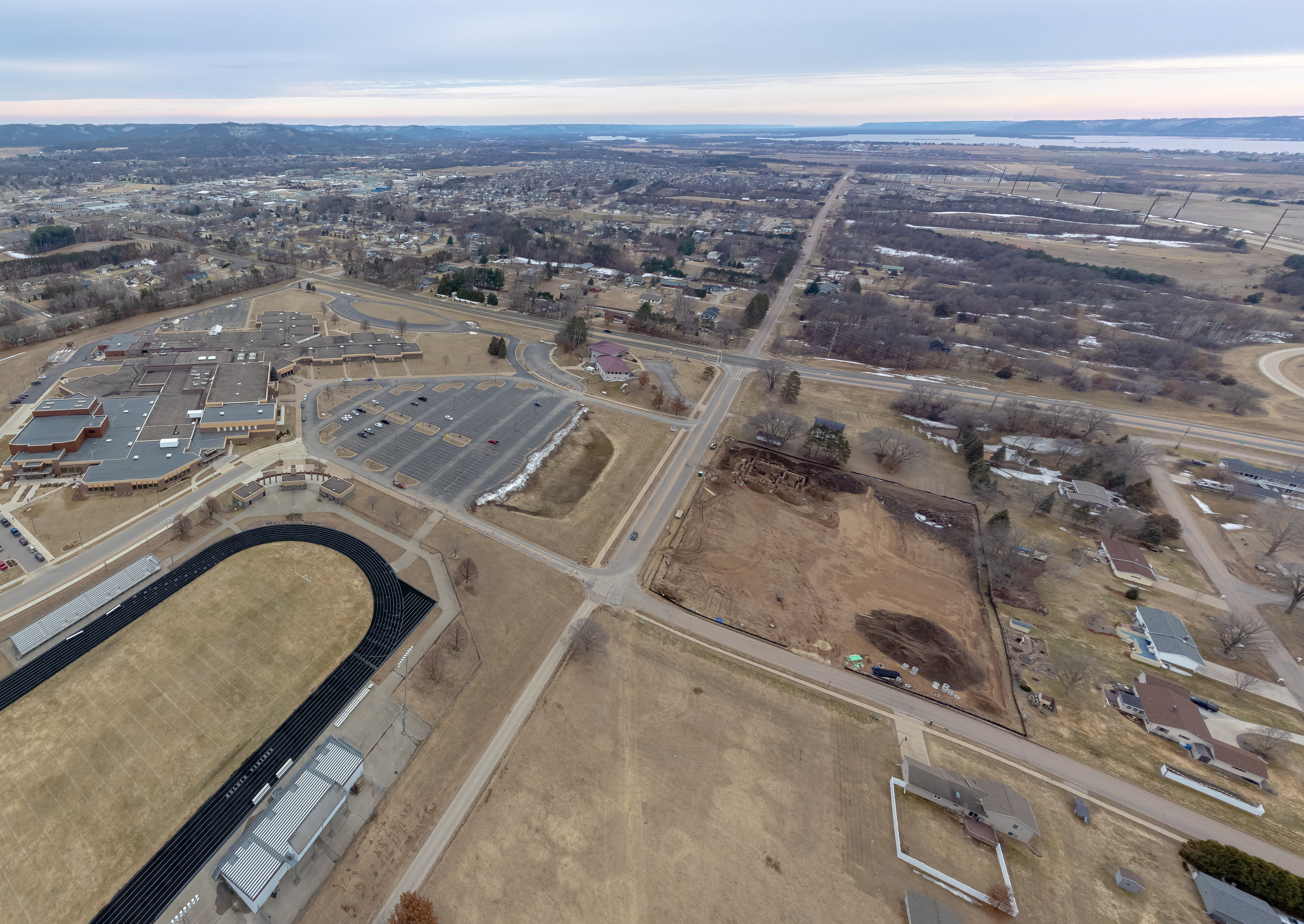
- View above from Holmen High School looking southeast towards downtown Holmen
- Motto: You're always welcome!
- Location of Holmen in La Crosse County, Wisconsin.
- Coordinates: 43°57′19″N 91°15′33″W
- Country: United States
- State: Wisconsin
- County: La Crosse
- Incorporated: May 7, 1946

Area
  - Total: 7.26 sq mi (18.81 km^{2})
  - Land: 7.26 sq mi (18.81 km^{2})
  - Water: 0 sq mi (0.00 km^{2})
- Elevation: 705 ft (215 m)

Population (2020)
  - Total: 10,661
  - Estimate (2023): 11,581 ▲
  - Density: 1,381.6/sq mi (533.45/km^{2})
- Time zone: UTC-6 (Central (CST))
  - Summer (DST): UTC-5 (CDT)
- Zip Code: 54636
- Area code: 608
- FIPS code: 55-35450
- GNIS feature ID: 1566559
- Website: www.holmenwi.gov

Holmen (/ˈhoʊlmən/ HOHL-mən) is a city in La Crosse County, Wisconsin, United States. The population was 10,661 as of the census of 2020. It is part of the La Crosse-Onalaska, WI-MN Metropolitan Statistical Area.

== History ==
Holmen was settled by Norwegian immigrants in 1862. It was incorporated as a city on May 7, 1946. The community was previously known as Frederickstown, to honor Holmen's blacksmith Frederick Anderson. The name was changed when Charles A. Sjölander opened the post office in September 1875. The name Holmen is a Norwegian word and translates to islet (a small island).

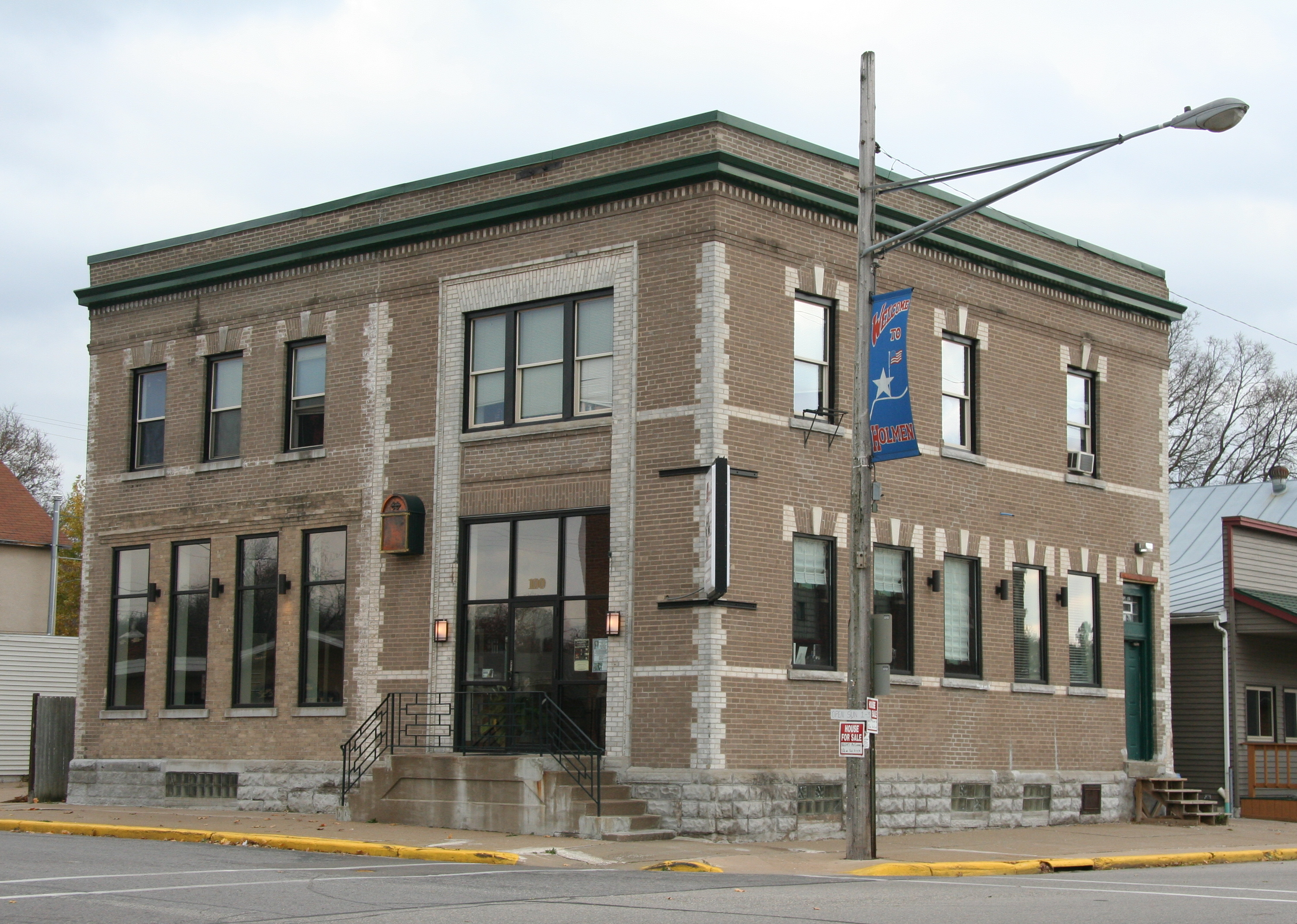
Historic Holmen Bank Building at the intersection of Main and State streets in Holmen, Wisconsin

== Geography ==
Holmen contains wooded areas, hills, and bluffs, typical of the Driftless Area, or Coulee Region. The Mississippi River passes just to the southwest of the city.

Holmen is located at 43°57′19″N 91°15′33″W (43.955330, −91.259132). According to the United States Census Bureau, the city has a total area of 5.20 square miles (13.47 km^{2}), all land. Star Hill is a prominent bluff adjacent to downtown Holmen and is one of the tallest areas of the city. The hill gets its name from a light up star on top of the hill.

== Demographics ==
Historical population
Census	Pop.	Note	%±
1950	584		—
1960	635		8.7%
1970	1,081		70.2%
1980	2,411		123.0%
1990	3,220		33.6%
2000	6,177		91.8%
2010	9,005		45.8%
2020	10,661		18.4%
2023 (est.)	11,581	▲	8.6%
U.S. Decennial Census 2020 census

=== 2020 census ===
As of the census of 2020, there were 10,661 people, 4,382 households, and 2,431 families residing in the city. The population density was 1,468.1 inhabitants per square mile (566.8/km^{2}). There were 4,382 housing units at an average density of 603.6 per square mile (233.1/km^{2}). The racial makeup of the city was 86.3% White, 1.1% African American, 7.8% Asian, and 3.4% from two or more races. Hispanic or Latino of any race were 2.7% of the population.

=== 2010 census ===
As of the census of 2010, there were 9,005 people, 3,400 households, and 2,431 families residing in the village. The population density was 1,731.7 inhabitants per square mile (668.6/km^{2}). There were 3,521 housing units at an average density of 677.1 per square mile (261.4/km^{2}). The racial makeup of the village was 90.4% White, 0.6% African American, 0.2% Native American, 7.0% Asian, 0.2% from other races, and 1.5% from two or more races. Hispanic or Latino of any race were 1.1% of the population.

There were 3,400 households, of which 41.4% had children under the age of 18 living with them, 55.5% were married couples living together, 10.8% had a female householder with no husband present, 5.2% had a male householder with no wife present, and 28.5% were non-families. 23.1% of all households were made up of individuals, and 8.2% had someone living alone who was 65 years of age or older. The average household size was 2.64 and the average family size was 3.14.

The median age in the village was 34.1 years. 30% of residents were under the age of 18; 6.7% were between the ages of 18 and 24; 30.6% were from 25 to 44; 22.7% were from 45 to 64; and 10.2% were 65 years of age or older. The gender makeup of the village was 48.9% male and 51.1% female.

== Education ==
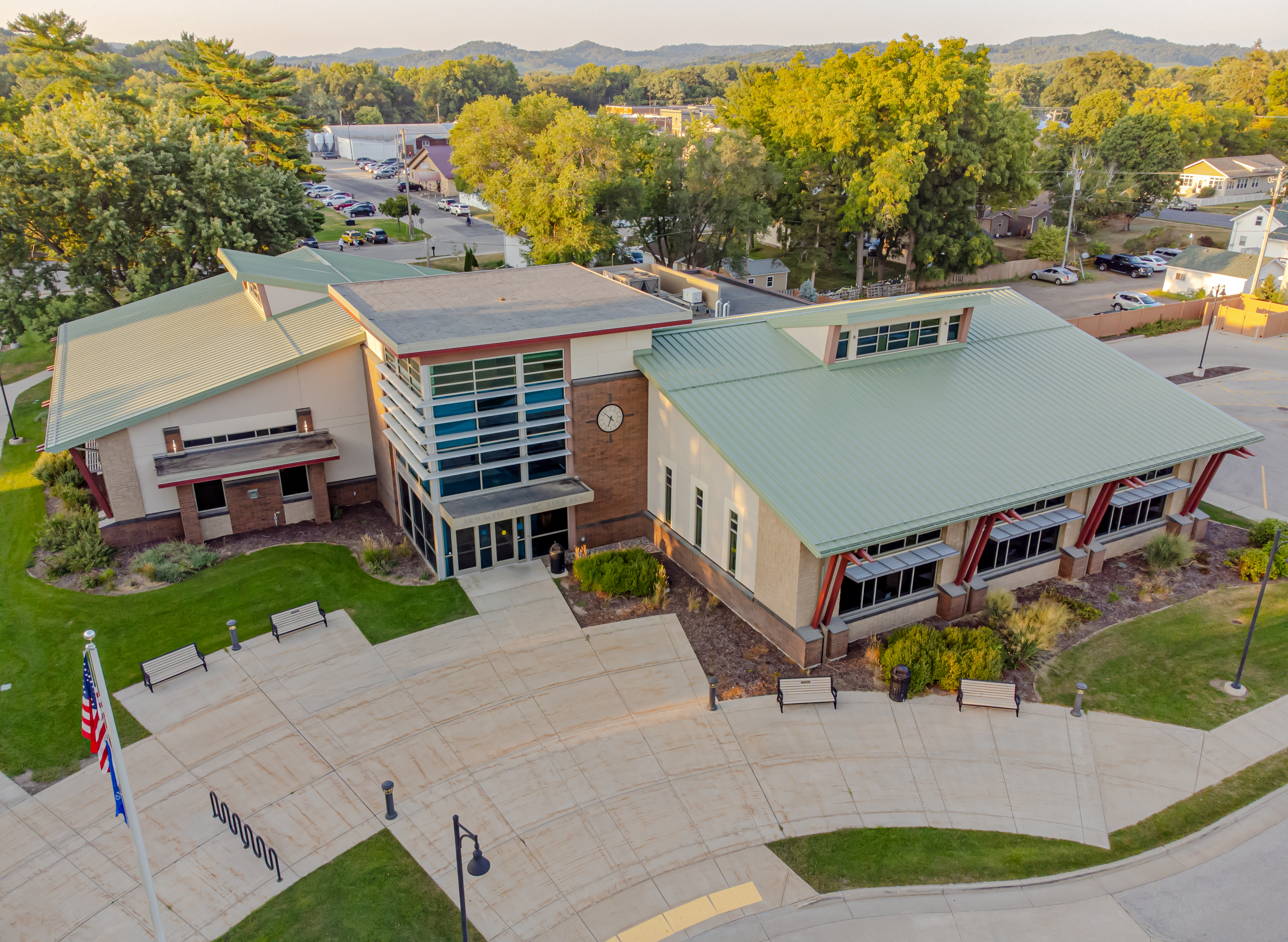
Holmen library

Holmen is part of the Holmen School District. Secondary education is provided by Holmen High School, Holmen Middle School and four elementary schools. The district's mascot is the Viking.

== Notable people ==
- Jeren Kendall, former baseball player in the minor league system of the Los Angeles Dodgers; attended Holmen High School and graduated in 2014
- Valentine S. Keppel, farmer, businessman, and politician, lived in Holmen
- Taylor Kohlwey, professional baseball outfielder for the San Diego Padres, attended Holmen High School and graduated in 2012.
- Craig Newsome, professional football player

== Gallery ==
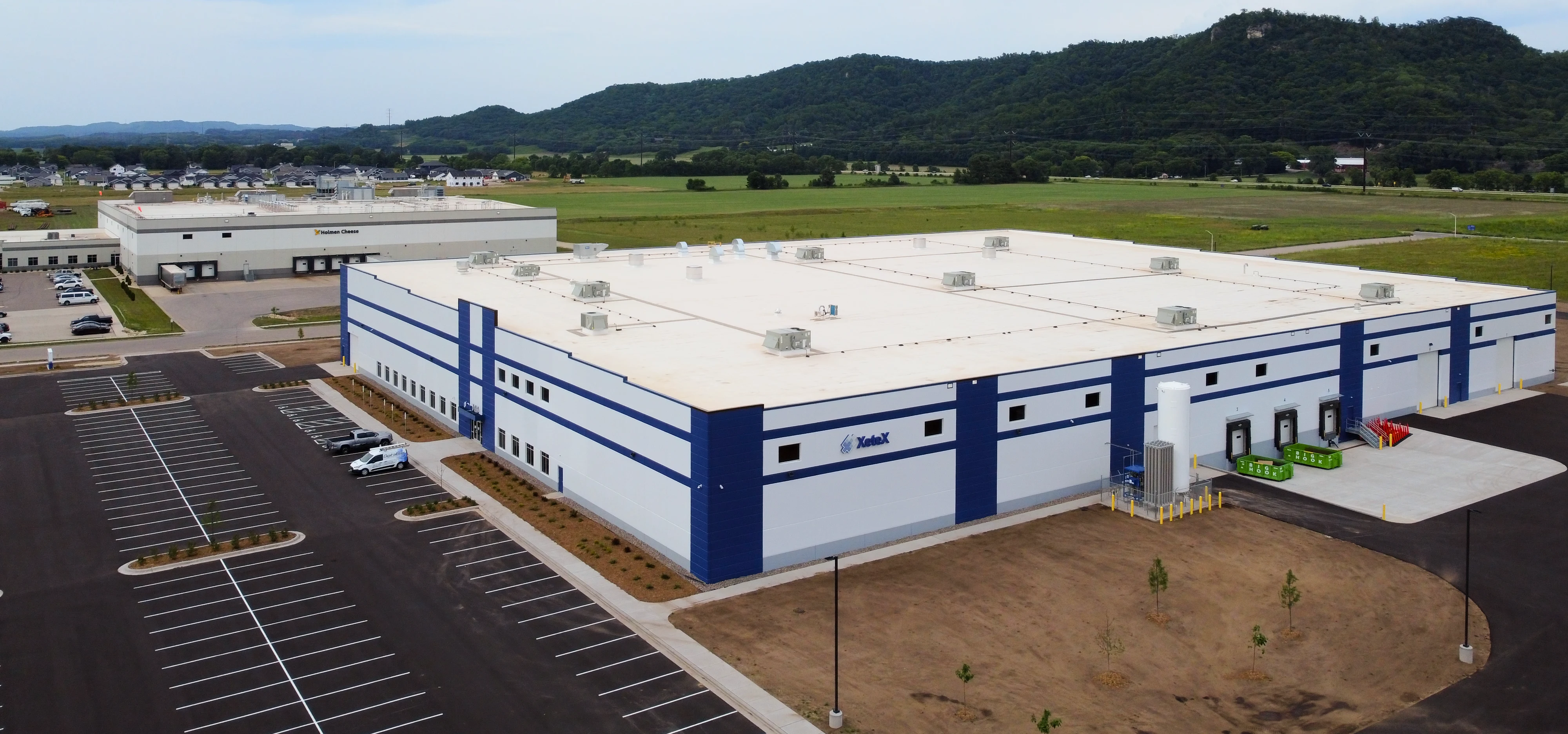
XeteX and Holmen Cheese plant

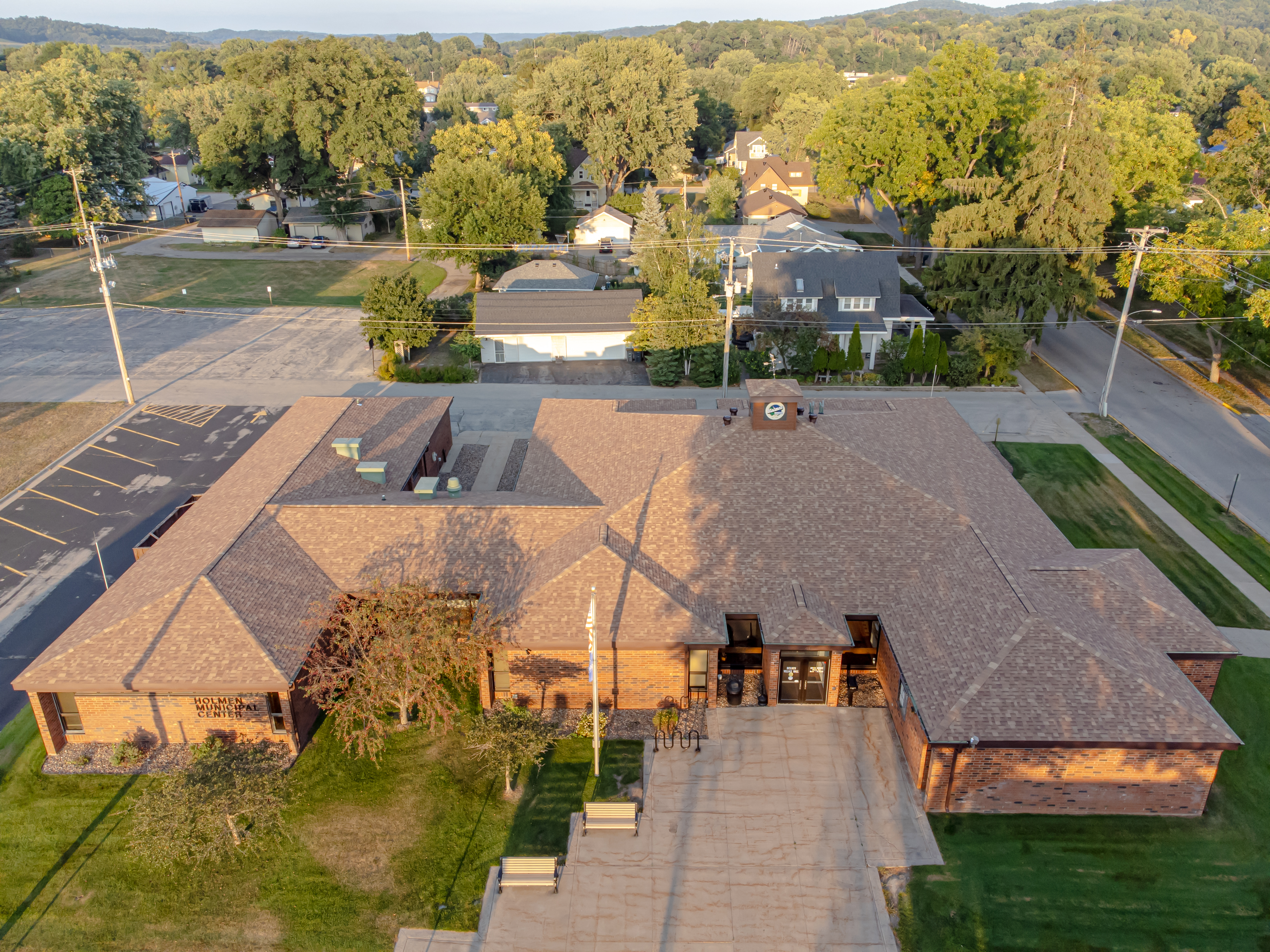
Holmen Municipal Center
