= Canadian Cardiovascular Society grading of angina pectoris =

- Purpose: grade the severity of exertional angina

The Canadian Cardiovascular Society grading of angina pectoris (sometimes referred to as the CCS Angina Grading Scale or the CCS Functional Classification of Angina) is a classification system used to grade the severity of exertional angina.

== Medical use ==
=== Relevance ===
The CCS grading system for angina is a clinical tool used by doctors to assess the degree of severity of a patient's angina. Whilst there are no defined therapy guidelines specific for each class, once the severity of the angina has been assessed, clinicians can use the framework to aid them in the development of an individual treatment plan. This will also depend on unique patient factors, such as age, and risk of major cardiac complications.

In low severity cases, treatment will primarily consist of lifestyle changes, such as exercise, change in diet, smoking cessation. Often, this will be supplemented with medication.

For higher severity cases, this medication may need to be combined with surgery. For example, percutaneous coronary intervention (PCI) or coronary artery bypass graft (CABG). Both PCI and CABG are effective at minimising symptoms and preventing progression of the symptoms. However, each therapy has its advantages and disadvantages when it comes to individual patient profile. PCI is one of the most commonly performed procedures on the heart. It is non-surgical, and so can be carried out safely in most patient groups. In high-risk patients, such as those over the age of 65, with diabetes, or with multi-vessel disorder, CABG may be the preferred technique. Although it is more invasive, in this group of patients, CABG has a higher long-term survival rate compared to PCI.

=== Acceptance ===
The CCS grading system is widely adopted in medical literature, with 656 manuscripts citing this grading system as of 2002 (87% were written in English, 28% in German, 27% in Russian, 22% in French, 2% each in Scandinavian and Spanish, and 1% in Japanese). The CCS grading system has also been described in at least 18 medical and nursing textbooks. Increasing CCSA class was associated with increased long-term mortality, even after adjusting for baseline characteristics (P<0.01). Eight-year mortality rates were 20.5%, 24.1%, 40.4% and 35.3% among class I, II, III and IV patients, respectively. Limitations of the CCS grading system include the lack of consideration of confounding factors, such as drug therapy before exertion (particularly sublingual nitrates), and personal warm-up. The rate of worsening angina significantly also increased with increasing CCS class from I to III.

=== Evaluation of fitness to fly ===
The CCS grading system for angina is, in part, used to evaluate fitness to fly by the British Cardiovascular Society. They recommend no action by class I and II patients with stable angina, class III should consider mobility assistance from airport staff and in-flight supplemental oxygen therapy, and that class IV patients should ideally defer their travel plans or travel with a medical chaperone and use supplemental oxygen in-flight.

== Functional classification ==
CCS grading of Angina pectoris
Class	Description of Angina severity	
0	Asymptomatic Angina	Mild myocardial ischemia with no symptoms.
I	Angina only with strenuous exertion	Presence of angina during strenuous, rapid, or prolonged ordinary activity (walking or climbing the stairs).
II	Angina with moderate exertion	Slight limitation of ordinary activities when they are performed rapidly, after meals, in cold, in wind, under emotional stress, during the first few hours after waking up, but also walking uphill, climbing more than one flight of ordinary stairs at a normal pace and in normal conditions.
III	Angina with mild exertion	Having difficulties walking one or two blocks or climbing one flight of stairs at normal pace and conditions.
IV	Angina at rest	No exertion needed to trigger angina.

(Note: Class 0 is not an official part of the CCS functional classification of angina pectoris, however it has been mentioned in several sources, referring to myocardial ischemia without symptoms.)

== History ==
Canadian Cardiovascular Society (CCS) is a national collaboration between cardiovascular clinicians and scientists, promoting cardiovascular health and care excellence through knowledge translation (dissemination of research and application of best practices), professional development, and leadership. The CCS developed the angina pectoris grading system in 1972; it was based on personal correspondence, information from MEDLINE and international citation indexes searches. The grading system was published in 1976 and since has been cited over 650 times.

The committee's directive was to standardise the definition of terms used in reporting patients who had coronary artery disease and coronary artery bypass graft surgery. The purpose of defining a scale for the severity of exertional angina was to evaluate the efficacy of medical and surgical therapy by comparing the patient's status before and after therapeutic interventions. It was expected that a four-grade instead of a three-grade system would result in a greater discriminative power that would ensure better reproducibility. The grading scale was derived and modelled using some criteria from the New York Heart Association Functional Classification and the American Medical Association classes of organic heart diseases. The severity of angina on exertion was categorised by independent observers who detailed threshold activities for each level and noted the changes over time (different stages of angina pectoris are based on the level of difficulties patients have with carrying out ordinary activities; ordinary activities includes walking and climbing the stairs).

== Epidemiology ==
Angina is not classified as a disease in itself, it refers to a person having chest pain with coronary heart disease, due to the lack of oxygen their myocardium as the presumed cause. A high mortality rate is associated with coronary heart disease. It is the leading cause of death in the United States, accounting for 26.6% of all death in 2005. Another study in the United States estimates that coronary heart disease has the greatest prevalence amongst people aged 65 years or over (19.8% in 2010), followed by people who are aged between 45 and 64 (with a prevalence of 7.1%). The United Kingdom also has a high mortality rate with 16% of all male deaths and 10% of all female deaths being attributable to coronary heart disease. However, it is worth noting that the mortality rate of coronary heart disease has been in steady decline since its peak in the 1960s, in contrast to the morbidity trend which has increased with increasing rates of revascularisation.

== Economic burden ==
Chronic angina is often associated with substantial economic burden to the society, both in terms of healthcare expenditure and lost productivity.

According to a network meta-analysis of cost-effectiveness studies the mean weight cost of coronary artery bypass grafting per patient is $27,003 and $28,670 at one and three years respectively, whereas three years' worth of medical treatment costs $13,864 per patient. The mean weight cost per patient undergoing percutaneous coronary intervention without stent (PTCA) after three years of follow up is $14,277. The expenditure increases significantly when patients require additional revascularization during follow-up.

In South Asian countries such as India, Bangladesh, Nepal and Sri Lanka, one aspect of healthcare expenditure on angina-affected households is out-of-pocket spending on medicine and primary outpatient care. This would point to greater reliance on trading household assets to finance health services, which have long-term implications on the affected households.

== See also ==
- European Heart Rhythm Association score of atrial fibrillation
- New York Heart Association Functional Classification of heart failure – a similar scale
