= Jeren Kendall =

American baseball player (born 1996)

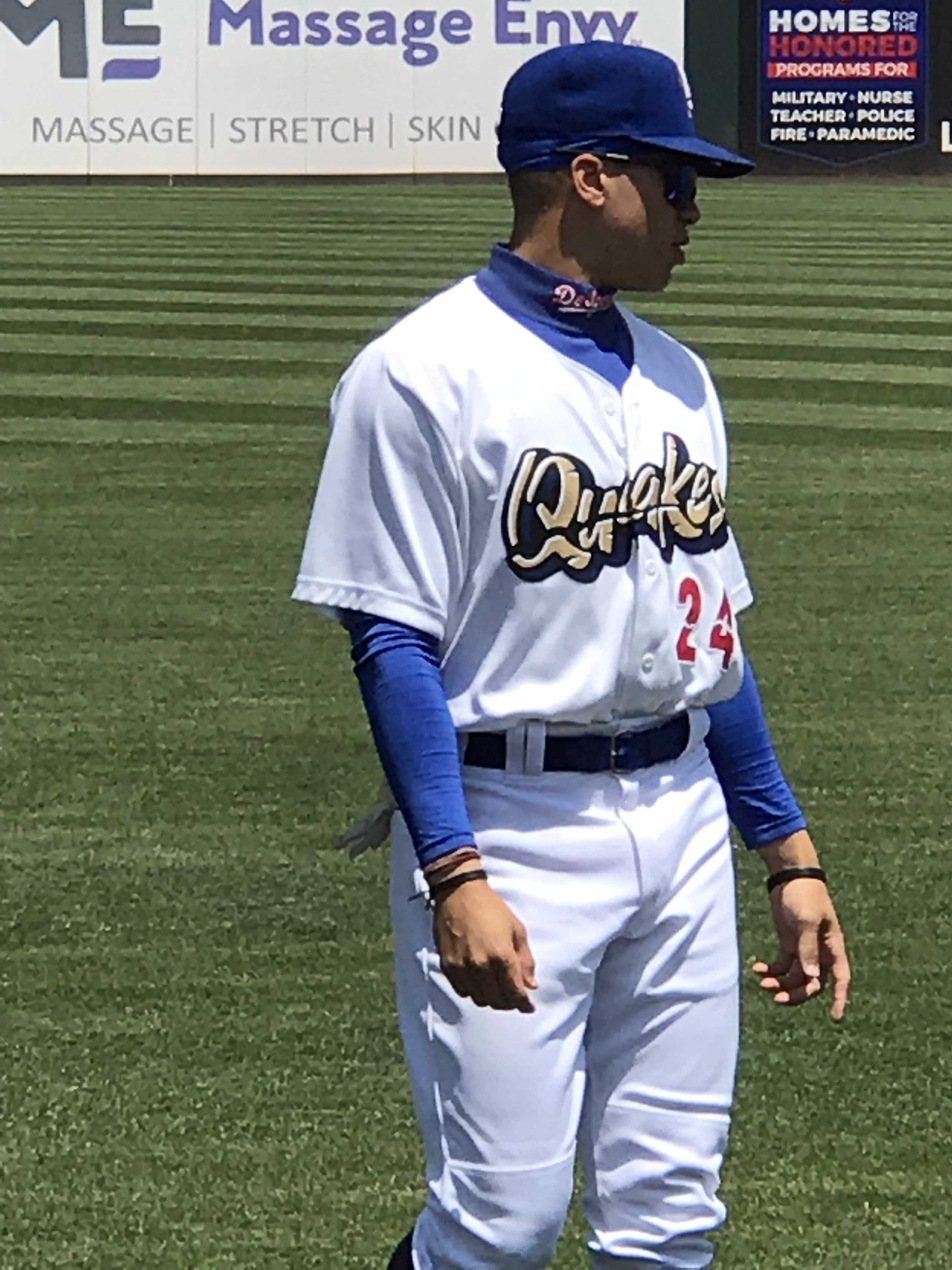
- Kendall with the Rancho Cucamonga Quakes in 2019
- Outfielder
- Born: February 4, 1996 (age 30); Clearwater, Florida, U.S.
- Bats: Left Throws: Right
- Stats at Baseball Reference

Jeren Alan Kendall (born February 4, 1996) is an American former professional baseball outfielder. He played college baseball for the Vanderbilt Commodores and was selected by the Dodgers in the first round of the 2017 MLB draft, where he played in their farm system through the 2022 season.

== Career ==
=== Amateur ===
Kendall attended Holmen High School in Holmen, Wisconsin. As a junior in 2013 he was the La Crosse Tribune Baseball Player of the Year after hitting .377 with four home runs and 15 runs batted in (RBI). As a senior, he was the Gatorade Baseball Player of the Year for Wisconsin. Kendall was drafted by the Boston Red Sox in the 30th round of the 2014 Major League Baseball draft, but did not sign and attended Vanderbilt University to play college baseball for the Commodores.

Kendall played in 60 games as a freshman at Vanderbilt in 2015, hitting .281/.394/.530 with eight home runs and 40 RBI. During the College World Series, he hit a walk-off home run to give Vanderbilt a 4–3 win over Cal State Fullerton. As a sophomore, he played in 62 games, hitting .332/.396/.568 with nine home runs, 59 RBI and 28 stolen bases. In 2015 and 2016, he played collegiate summer baseball with the Cotuit Kettleers of the Cape Cod Baseball League.

=== Minor leagues ===
Kendall was selected by the Los Angeles Dodgers in the first round of the 2017 Major League Baseball draft. and signed with them on July 7, 2017, for a $2.9 million bonus. He made his professional debut with the Ogden Raptors of the rookie-class Pioneer Baseball League on July 19, and had three hits in three at-bats with two RBIs in Ogden's victory over the Helena Brewers. He played in only five games with Ogden, with 10 hits in 22 at-bats (.455 average) and he was promoted to the Class-A Great Lakes Loons of the Midwest League in late July. With the Loons, he hit .221 in 35 games the rest of the season. He was promoted to the Rancho Cucamonga Quakes of the Advanced Class A California League for the 2018 season, where he played in 114 games and hit .215 with 12 home runs, 42 RBIs, and 37 steals.

Kendall spent 2019 back with Rancho Cucamonga. Over 96 games, he slashed .219/.319/.469 with 19 home runs, 63 RBIs, and 24 stolen bases. The minor league season was cancelled in 2020 as a result of the COVID-19 pandemic so he did not play again until 2021, when he was assigned to the Tulsa Drillers of Double-A Central where he played in 57 games and hit .209 with 10 homers and 35 RBI. In 2022 he appeared in 84 games for Tulsa, hitting .162. Kendall retired from baseball on December 16, 2022.

== Personal ==
His father, Jeremey Kendall, played Minor League Baseball in the Philadelphia Phillies organization.
