= William V. Judy =

American author & academic (1938–2022)

William V. Judy, Ph.D. (April 16, 1938 – October 30, 2022) was an American author, clinical researcher, clinical trial consultant, and retired professor of physiology and biophysics. He was first introduced to the field of Coenzyme Q10 clinical research by Karl Folkers, the American bio-chemist who determined the structure of the Coenzyme Q10 molecule.

Judy managed randomized controlled trials into the safety and efficacy of Coenzyme Q10 supplementation for patients with heart failure, chronic fatigue syndrome, Parkinson's disease or prostate cancer. He was instrumental in the treating of children with Prader-Willi syndrome with Coenzyme Q10. He also did an extensive study of the absorption and bio-availability of various formulations of Coenzyme Q10 supplements.

In 1995, Judy founded the SIBR Research Institute, of which he was the president. The SIBR Research Institute helps develop clinical trial protocols to test the safety and efficacy of natural products. It is a full-service clinical research institute. Judy was the author of numerous scholarly journal articles, college textbooks, and the book The Substance That Powers Life: Coenzyme Q10, An Insider's Guide.

Judy died on October 30, 2022, at the age of 84.

== Education and early career ==
Judy did his undergraduate studies in Anatomy and Physiology at the University of Kentucky in Lexington, KY. He then did graduate study in bio-physics and physiology at the University of Kentucky from which he graduated with the successful defense of his MS degree thesis in 1963. The title of his thesis was Calorigenic Response of Warm and Cold-Adapted Rabbits to Intravenous Infusion of Epinephrine and Norepinephrine. He earned his Ph.D. at the West Virginia Medical School, Morgantown, West Virginia (1971) after defending his dissertation Sympathetic Nervous System Control of Renal Hemodynamics.

For a number of years, from 1963 to 1968, Judy worked in the field of bio-physics at the Manned Space Craft Center in Houston, Texas, and at Cape Canaveral in Florida. He conducted in-flight medical experiments on the Gemini and Apollo missions. He was the first to put an artificial gravitational force on the venous circulation in the prevention of orthostatic hypotension. He also monitored contracts with universities and space program industry corporations that were doing contract work for NASA.

== Research into Coenzyme Q10 clinical applications ==
In 1968, Judy met Karl Folkers, the chemist who had determined the structure of the Coenzyme Q10 molecule in 1958 while Folkers was working at the Merck Research Laboratories in New Jersey. By 1968, Folkers had established the Institute for Bio-Medical Research at the University of Texas in Austin. The purpose of the new institute was to increase the understanding of the importance of the substance Coenzyme Q10 to human health.

Folkers encouraged Judy to do, first, preclinical studies of Coenzyme Q10 absorption and bio-availability using live dogs, which were not put to sleep during the experiments and were not sacrificed after the experiments.

In the 1980s, Judy began to administer clinical studies of the safety and health effects of Coenzyme Q10 supplementation in humans.

=== Heart failure patients ===
In 1984, Judy published clinical trial results showing that 28 of 34 patients diagnosed with congestive heart failure (NYHA class IV) had responded well to Coenzyme Q10 treatment with improved cardiac hemodynamics and kinetics. In 1985, Judy conducted a successful five-year study in Class IV congestive heart failure patients.

In 1986, Judy published the first report of the long-term management of end stage heart failure with Coenzyme Q10.

This study has developed into a 30-year study of the management of congestive heart failure with the ubiquinone form of Coenzyme Q10. It has shown that heart failure patients who received Coenzyme Q10 supplementation together with their conventional medications have a significantly better survival than patients who receive placebo supplementation together with their conventional medications.

Moreover, in 1986, Judy published the results of a double-blind, crossover study of the effect of Coenzyme Q10 on patients with cardiac disease. The study data showed that improvement in cardiac pumping and contractibility came, typically, within 30 to 60 days of daily supplementation with 100 milligrams of Coenzyme Q10. Peak response came, generally, with 90 days of supplementation. Coenzyme Q10 supplementation did not improve heart function quickly but did result in significantly increased long-term improvement. Furthermore, if the Coenzyme Q10 treatment was discontinued, then the patients' heart function gradually decreased.

In 1991, Judy reported the subsequent findings from the long-term management of heart failure patients with adjunctive Coenzyme Q10 treatment. He reported that Coenzyme Q10 is a safe and naturally occurring mediator of the process of cellular bio-energetics well-suited for long-term use. Coenzyme Q10 is not a fast-acting substance in heart failure. If the patient's condition is so severe that he or she does not have 40 – 60 to respond, then the CoQ10 treatment is likely to be ineffective. Once the patient responds to the Coenzyme Q10 treatment, however, and his or her heart function begins to improve, then the clinical course becomes more stable and the patient's condition is easier to manage. Improvement of one or two NYHA functional classes is likely. Coenzyme Q10 adjunctive treatment of heart failure patients is a long-term therapy because patients whose Coenzyme Q10 treatment is discontinued will have a clinical relapse.

Clinical relapse after discontinuation of long-term Coenzyme Q10 therapy did not follow the same course as clinical relapse after discontinuation of short-term Coenzyme Q10 therapy. The relapse after the withdrawal of short-term Coenzyme Q10 therapy tended to be a rapid relapse followed by deterioration of heart function; the relapse after the withdrawal of long-term Coenzyme Q10 therapy was delayed and reduced by comparison.

In summary, long-term management of severe heart failure patients with 100 milligrams of Coenzyme Q10 per day in conjunction with conventional therapy showed that 70% responded to the Coenzyme Q10 treatment albeit fairly slowly. Peak improvements came, typically, within 8–12 months. Survival (1–8 years) in the Coenzyme Q10 group was greater than in a matched control group (n=90) treated with conventional drugs only. The results of this early study showed that long-term Coenzyme Q10 therapy is safe, is effective in chronic heart failure patients with measurable CoQ10 deficiency, and is associated with improved long-term survival compared to conventionally treated patients.

Judy's clinical studies of Coenzyme Q10 supplementation of heart failure patients are the forerunners of the international multi-center Q-Symbio Study of the Effect of Coenzyme Q10 on Morbidity and Mortality in Chronic Heart Failure. In that study, 106 weeks of adjunctive treatment of chronic heart failure patients with 3 times 100 milligrams of a daily ubiquinone Coenzyme Q10 supplement in addition to conventional heart failure medicine was associated with significant reductions in major adverse cardiovascular events, cardiovascular mortality, all-cause mortality, and hospitalizations as compared to placebo. In the European segment of the Q-Symbio Study, the active Coenzyme Q10 treatment also increased the patients' left ventricular ejection fraction significantly.

=== Heart surgery patients ===
In 1993, Judy reported the results of a clinical trial of the efficacy of Coenzyme Q10 supplementation of heart surgery patients. One group of patients received 100 milligrams of Coenzyme Q10 per day for 14 days prior to the surgery and for 30 days following the surgery. The other group of patients received a placebo for the same periods.

Patients in both groups had a documented blood Coenzyme Q10 deficiency (< 0.6 micrograms per milliliter), low cardiac index (< 2.4 L/m^{2} per minute), and low left ventricular ejection fraction (< 35%) prior to the Coenzyme Q10 treatment.

Pre-surgery supplementation improved blood Coenzyme Q10 and heart muscle tissue Coenzyme Q10 levels and heart muscle tissue ATP significantly compared to the placebo supplementation. Cardiac index and ejection fraction also improved but not to the level of statistical significance.

Post-surgery supplementation was positively associated with the maintenance of normal blood and heart muscle tissue Coenzyme Q10 levels and normal heart muscle tissue ATP levels and with significantly improved cardiac index and ejection fraction.

The course of recovery in the Coenzyme Q10 supplemented group was short (3–5 days) and uncomplicated. By contrast, the course of recovery in the placebo group was longer (15–30 days) and more complicated. There was a positive relationship between blood and heart muscle Coenzyme Q10 levels, heart muscle ATP levels, and indicators of heart function, on the one hand, and post-operative recovery time, on the other hand.

=== Chronic fatigue syndrome ===
In 1998, Judy reported the results of a study of Coenzyme Q10 supplementation of chronic fatigue syndrome patients. Two groups of patients, similar in age, exercise tolerance, and duration of illness were given 100 milligrams and 300 milligrams of Coenzyme Q10, respectively. 60% of the patients in the 100-milligram group responded to the treatment; 91% of the patients in the 300-milligram group responded. In the non-responders, the blood and tissue CoQ10 levels did increase with the supplementation but not to the extent that they increased in the responders.

The average time to a discernible change in exercise tolerance and recovery time was 30 days in the group of patients who took 300 milligrams of Coenzyme Q10 daily and 60 days in the group of patients that took 100 milligrams of Coenzyme Q10 daily. The increased dosage of Coenzyme Q10 yielded greater effectiveness. By 180 days, patients in both groups had experienced significant improvements in exercise tolerance and recovery time. Interestingly, despite the statistically significant increases, the chronic fatigue syndrome patients supplemented with Coenzyme Q10 could not reach the exercise tolerance levels of normal individuals, at least not within 180 days of supplementation.

When the patients taking the Coenzyme Q10 were switched over to placebo, they reverted to the pre-Coenzyme Q10 treatment levels with 60 days (the 100-milligram group) and 90 days (the 300-milligam group).

In addition to chronic fatigue syndrome and chronic heart failure, there are numerous low-energy conditions to which the bio-energetic effects of Coenzyme Q10 can plausibly be extended: fibromyalgia, Huntington's chorea, muscular dystrophy, multiple sclerosis, Parkinson's disease, Prader-Willi syndrome, and some forms of cancers.

Once humans reach adulthood, Coenzyme Q10 bio-synthesis begins to decrease with increasing age, resulting in less energy. The KiSel-10 Study of combined Coenzyme Q10 and selenium supplementation of senior citizens for years has shown that daily supplementation with 2 times 100 milligrams of Coenzyme Q10 and 200 micrograms of selenium is associated with significant reduction of cardiovascular mortality, significant improvement of heart function, and significant improvement of health-related quality of life.

=== Cancer ===
Folkers and Judy did case studies of the effects of Coenzyme Q10 on various cancers in patients with congestive heart failure. Coenzyme Q10 put the cancers into remission, improved heart function, and reduced the degree of heart failure.

In 1998, Judy reported that PSA and prostate mass decreased following the treatment of prostate cancer patients with high dosages of Coenzyme Q10 (600 milligrams per day). However, the Coenzyme Q10 treatment did not take effect rapidly. It took 60–80 days before the researchers began to see a drop in the PSA scores and the prostate mass measurements. By 180 days of supplementation, PSA and prostate mass were significantly reduced in all of the responding patients. At 360 days of supplementation, PSA and prostate mass were reduced by 73.6% and 48.4%, respectively.

Younger early-onset prostate cancer patients were the best responders to the Coenzyme Q10 treatment. The poorest responders to the Coenzyme Q10 treatment were the oldest and most severe patients with the highest PSA, the largest prostate glands, and metastasis to adjacent tissues and bones [10]. In the responders, blood Coenzyme Q10 levels increased five-fold with the supplementation, and lymphocyte counts increased to normal levels. In non-responders, the blood Coenzyme Q10 levels increased only two-fold, and the lymphocyte counts remained essentially unchanged.

Judy and Folkers suggested that Coenzyme Q10 stimulation of immunoglobulin G antibodies and T4/T8 lymphocytes as well as possible positive effects of Coenzyme Q10 on cytotoxic T-cells might explain the observed prostate cancer regression.

In a 1984 study, Judy reported that Coenzyme Q10 supplementation could help to offset the inhibitory effects of the chemotherapy drug adriamycin (doxorubicin) on the bio-synthesis of Coenzyme Q10 and could alleviate the cardio-toxicity of the drug. Adriamycin is an established chemotherapeutic drug with known anti-tumor effects; however, its use was limited by its documented cardio-toxicity at higher dosages.

In the study, Judy and his co-researchers started the Coenzyme Q10 supplementation at a dosage of 100 milligrams per day three to five days before the adriamycin treatment began. The Coenzyme Q10 treatment proved to be effective in cancer patients with normal cardiac function prior to the commencement of the adriamycin treatment. These Coenzyme Q10-treated patients could take a significantly higher total accumulated dosage of adriamycin without any significant changes in cardiac hemodynamics or kinetics as compared to chemotherapy patients not on Coenzyme Q10.

In the cancer patients with low cardiac function prior to the initiation of therapy, Coenzyme Q10 treatment did not produce the same beneficial results. Judy interpreted this outcome as an indication that patients with baseline low cardiac function are at risk for cardio-toxicity caused by adriamycin therapy.

=== Parkinson's disease ===
Judy and the SIBR Research group have supplemented several Parkinson's patients with Coenzyme Q10 in the period from 1995 to 2019. Coenzyme Q10 supplementation has been found to decrease the progression of Parkinson's disease in early-onset Parkinson's disease but not in patients with full-blown disabling disease. Many of these early-onset disease patients have been functional for as many as 24 years [1 p 135].

=== Prader-Willi syndrome ===
Especially of concern to Judy has been the treatment and care of children with Prader-Willi syndrome. These children have a rare genetic disease that results in poor sucking reflex, muscle weakness, fatigue, and a constant feeling of being hungry (inability to feel full). Because of their inability to exercise caused by their muscle weakness and their insatiable appetites coupled with an inability to convert carbohydrates to energy, these children can become overweight and obese.

In 1999, Judy conducted a one-year study of children aged three months to six years diagnosed with Prader-Willi syndrome. He matched the Prader-Willi children in the study with normal children of similar age and sex.

The Prader-Willi children in the study had a mean plasma Coenzyme Q10 concentration of 0.38 micrograms per milliliter. The children tolerated the Coenzyme Q10 treatment well.

The children who were receiving tube feeding because they were too weak to suckle began to suckle 10 days after the initiation of the Coenzyme Q10 supplementation.

The children who were of an age to be able to walk but could not walk because of muscle weakness began to take their first steps two to three weeks after they started on the Coenzyme Q10 treatment.

In 2000, Judy together with his colleague Stogsdill started the Cyto-Med company, which supplies Coenzyme Q10 to children with Prader-Willi syndrome. Cyto-Med ships Coenzyme Q10 to children in 14 different countries. Prader-Willi children's cells cannot synthesize adequate quantities of Coenzyme Q10. Coenzyme Q10 supplementation is necessary to make up for the failure to synthesize Coenzyme Q10 and to lessen the resulting developmental difficulties.

== Coenzyme Q10: Facts or fabrications ==
In 2007, Judy wrote a seminal paper about the crystalline Coenzyme Q10 raw material. He emphasized the need for the crystals to be dissociated into single free molecules to be absorbed, and he discussed the simple passive facilitated diffusion process by which the molecules can be absorbed in the small intestines. He explained the transport of the fat-soluble Coenzyme Q10 molecules, their conversion from the oxidized form, ubiquinone, to the reduced form, ubiquinol, and the importance of the supplement formulation for the bio-availability of Coenzyme Q10. He concluded by elucidating the biological functions of the ubiquinone and ubiquinol molecules.

== Non-invasive transthoracic bio-electrical impedance method ==
Already in 1981, Judy did a study showing that the transthoracic electrical impedance method for measuring cardiac output in humans warranted further consideration as a non-invasive clinical tool that will be applicable in the investigation of the hemodynamics of normal and altered physiological states.

As a graduate student and NIH fellow at Baylor University Medical School (1963), Judy was introduced to the bioelectrical impedance method as a noninvasive means of measuring stroke volume and cardiac output. He helped develop this method for space flight in 1964 and 1965. He implemented this system in the clinical arena in 1971. After 56 years of development, this technology has drastically improved as a result of Judy's research. Total cardiac function can be measured by this system. The measurements include not only stroke volume and cardiac output but also left ventricular end diastolic filling volume and ejection fraction.

Using a scanning system, total coronary blood flow can be measured as well as the location and magnitude of inter-vascular stenosis. These systems are used around the world in clinical screening of cardiac function and in research. The non-invasive bioelectrical impedance technology is a low-cost high technology system designed by Judy as a solution to high cost of cardiac diagnostic procedures.

== Research findings ==
Judy's research into the absorption, bio-availability, and clinical effects of Coenzyme Q10 have led him to the following conclusions:

- The oxidized form, ubiquinone, is the more stable and better documented form of Coenzyme Q10. It is an electron acceptor. It is essential in the process of cellular ATP energy generation.
- The reduced form, ubiquinol, is the antioxidant form. It is an electron donor. It neutralizes superoxides and harmful free radicals. By its nature, it is less stable than the ubiquinone form.
- The benzoquinone head and the isoprene tail of the ubiquinone molecule are created in the mitochondria, the endoplasmic reticulum, and in organelles called peroxisomes. The head and the tail section are joined in a condensation reaction. Ubiquinol is converted from ubiquinone by oxidoreductase enzymes.
- In the Coenzyme Q10 cycle, all three redox forms of Coenzyme Q10 – ubiquinone, ubiquinol, and the unstable intermediate form semiubiquinone – are converted from one form to the other.
- Regardless of whether the oral Coenzyme Q10 supplement is ingested in the ubiquinone form or the ubiquinol form, the Coenzyme Q10 will be absorbed in the ubiquinone form and will be rapidly converted to the ubiquinol form in the lymph. It will enter the blood circulation predominantly in the ubiquinol form.
