= Fern P. Rathe =

American organic chemist

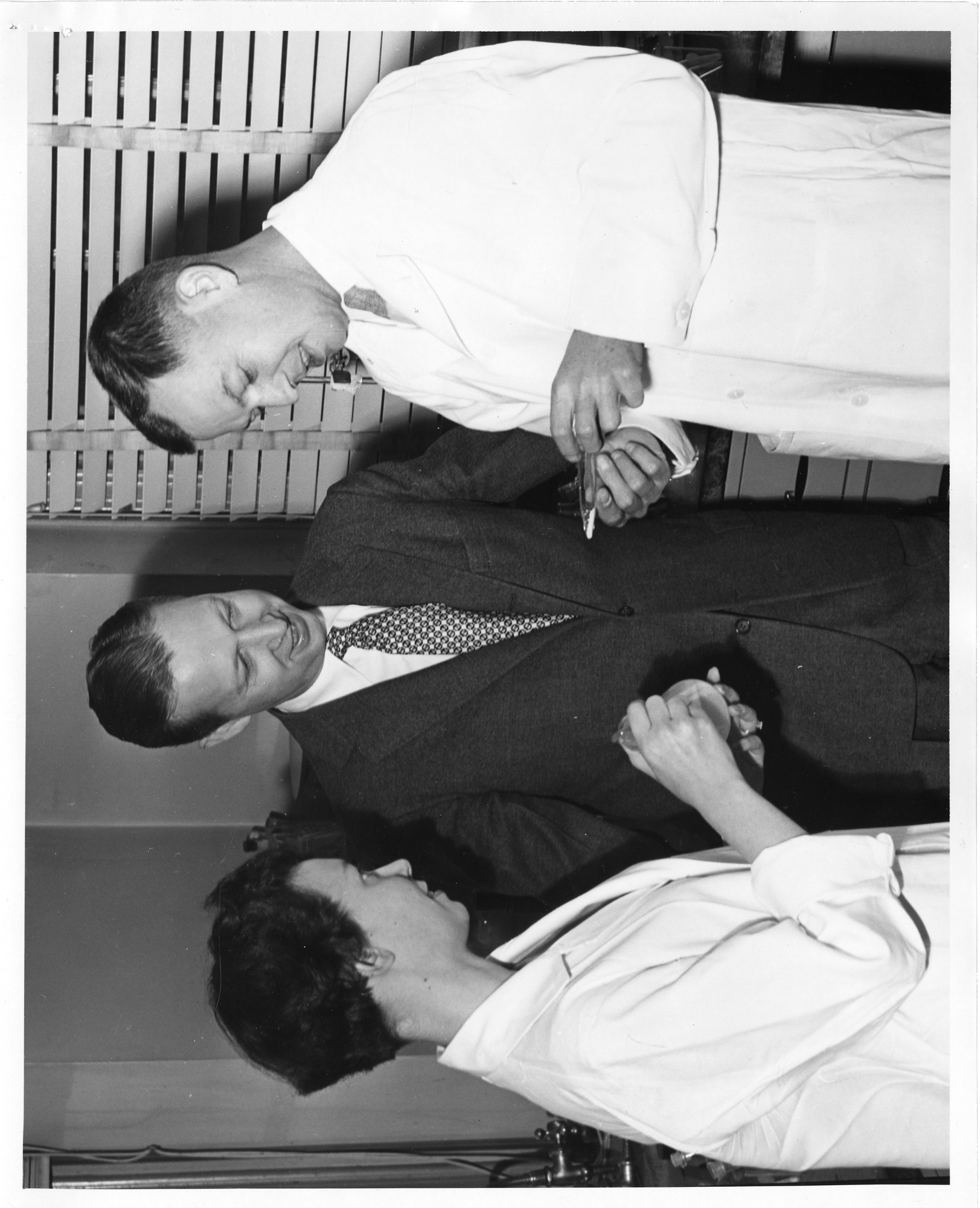
- Born: January 8, 1930; La Crosse
- Died: September 27, 2013 (aged 83); Guttenberg
- Alma mater: Carleton College
- Employer: Merck & Co.

Fern Pfafflin Rathe (January 8, 1930 – September 27, 2013) was an American organic chemist who helped discover cathomycin, an antibiotic used to treat strains of the bacteria Staphylococcus, while working at pharmaceutical company Merck & Co.

== Early life and education ==
Fern Pfafflin was born in La Crosse, Wisconsin, on January 8, 1930. She was the only child of Edward and Bessie (Chalsma) Pfafflin. She was raised on a family farm near New Amsterdam, Wisconsin, attending a one-room rural schoolhouse. She graduated as the valedictorian of Holmen High School in 1948.

Pfafflin attended Carleton College and received her bachelor's degree in 1952, majoring in chemistry and zoology. She met her husband, John Rathe, at Carleton and they married in August 1953.

== Career in chemical research ==
After graduating, Rathe worked as a biochemist for Merck and Company in Rahway, New Jersey, as a part of the research team of Karl August Folkers. One of the projects she was involved in was a search for new antibiotics. Rathe, Folkers, and Edward Anthony Kaczka were first to isolate cathomycin in 1955. The antibiotic was crystallized for the first time at Rathe's lab bench.

She worked at the Merck Research Lab until she started her family in 1956.

== Later life ==
Rathe lived with her husband and four children in Moline, Illinois. She earned her private pilot license with a twin-engine rating. Rathe was an active member of the Ninety-Nines organization for female pilots, and in 1971 she flew co-pilot in the Powder Puff Derby Air Race.

Rathe died in Guttenberg, Iowa, on September 27, 2013, after living with advanced Parkinson's disease.
