= Taylor Kohlwey =

American baseball player (born 1994)

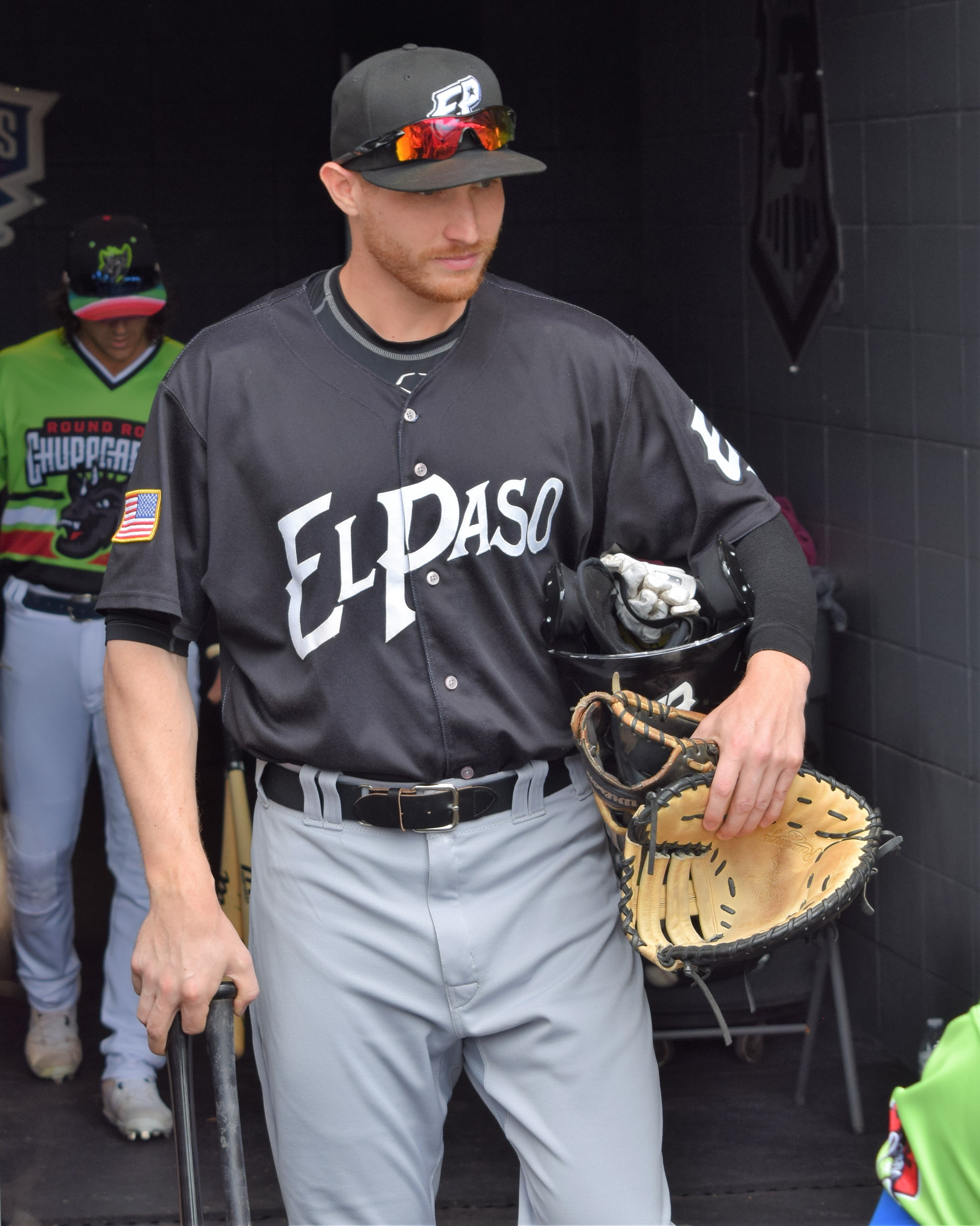
- Kohlwey with the El Paso Chihuahuas in 2022

Free agent
- Outfielder
- Born: July 20, 1994 (age 32); Holmen, Wisconsin, U.S.
- Bats: Left Throws: Left

MLB debut
- July 19, 2023, for the San Diego Padres

MLB statistics (through 2023 season)
- Batting average: .154
- Home runs: 0
- Runs batted in: 0
- Stats at Baseball Reference

Teams
- San Diego Padres (2023)

Taylor Kohlwey (born July 20, 1994) is an American professional baseball outfielder who is a free agent. He has previously played in Major League Baseball (MLB) for the San Diego Padres. He made his MLB debut in 2023.

== Amateur career ==
Kohlwey attended Holmen High School in Holmen, Wisconsin, and played college baseball at the University of Wisconsin–La Crosse. As a senior at UW-La Crosse in 2016, he batted .485 with nine home runs, 57 RBIs, 22 doubles, and 76 runs scored over 49 starts. Following his senior season, he was selected by the San Diego Padres in the 21st round of the 2016 Major League Baseball draft.

== Professional career ==
=== San Diego Padres ===
Kohlwey split his first professional season between the Tri-City Dust Devils, Fort Wayne TinCaps, and Lake Elsinore Storm, and returned to Lake Elsinore for the 2017 season. He played the 2018 season with Lake Elsinore and the San Antonio Missions, and split the 2019 season between Lake Elsinore, the Amarillo Sod Poodles, and the El Paso Chihuahuas.

Kohlwey did not play in a game in 2020 due to the cancellation of the minor league season because of the COVID-19 pandemic. He played the 2021 season with both San Antonio and El Paso. He returned to El Paso for the 2022 season. Over 128 games, he compiled a .297/.389/.443 slash line with 11 home runs, 82 RBIs, and 32 doubles.

Kohlwey began the 2023 season back in El Paso, where he played in 78 games and hit .261/.377/.437 with 9 home runs, 49 RBI, and 10 stolen bases. On July 18, 2023, Kohlwey was selected to the 40-man roster and promoted to the major leagues for the first time. In 5 games for San Diego, he went 2–for–13 (.154) with no home runs or RBI. On November 17, Kohlwey was non–tendered by the Padres and became a free agent.

=== New York Mets ===
On December 8, 2023, Kohlwey signed a minor league contract with the New York Mets that included an invitation to spring training. In 11 games for the Triple–A Syracuse Mets, he went 3–for–34 (.088) with no home runs and two RBI. Kohlwey was released by the Mets organization on April 28, 2024.

=== Long Island Ducks ===
On May 9, 2024, Kohlwey signed with the Long Island Ducks of the Atlantic League of Professional Baseball. In 49 appearances for the Ducks, he slashed .240/.352/.322 with two home runs, 21 RBI, and two stolen bases. Kohlwey became a free agent following the season.

On April 11, 2025, Kohlwey re-signed with Long Island. In 114 games with the Ducks he hit .291/.372/.443 with 10 home runs, 64 RBIs and 15 stolen bases. He became a free agent following the season.
