= Holmen High School =

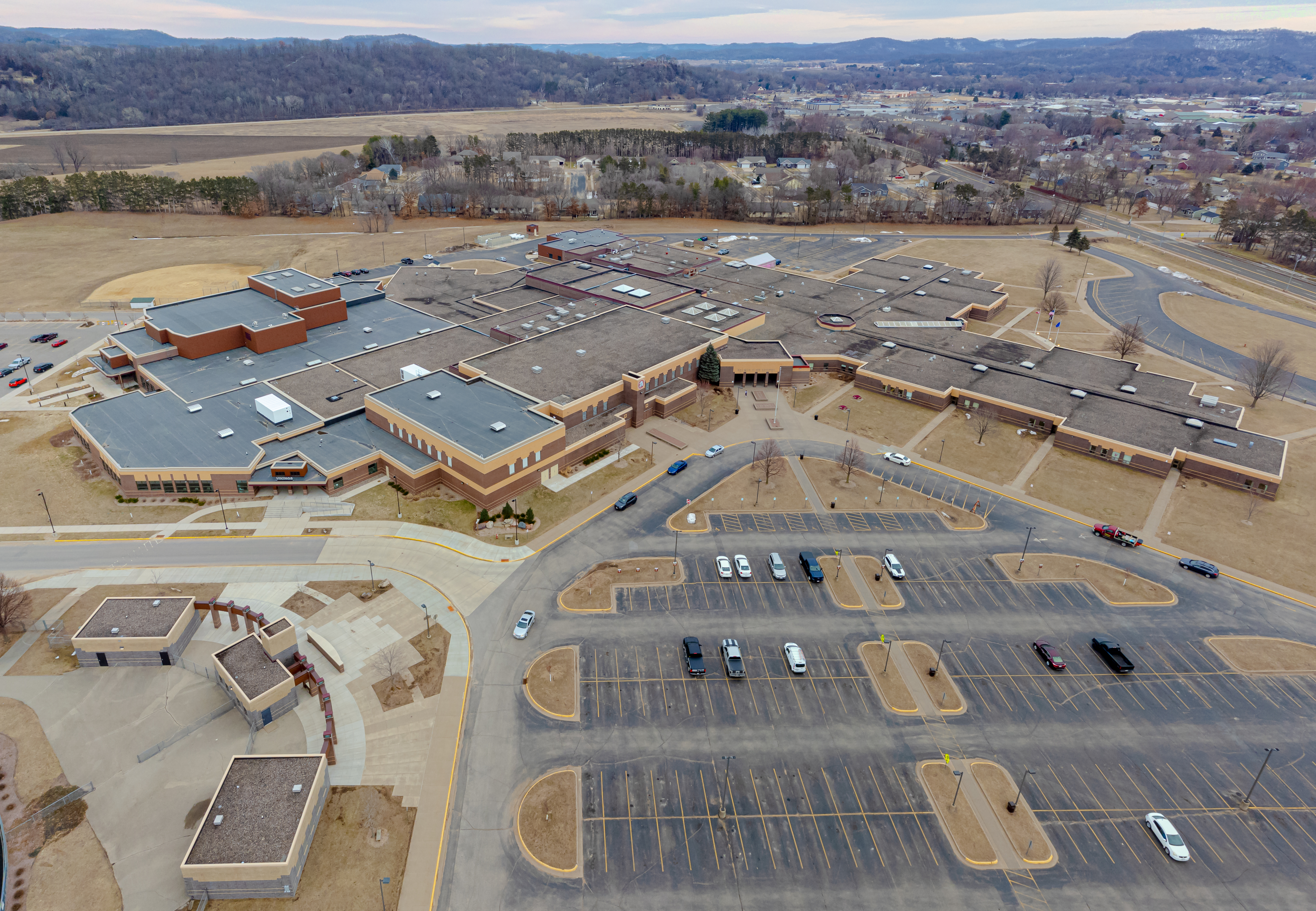
- Holmen High School From Above

Location
- 1001 McHugh Road; Holmen, Wisconsin 54636; United States; 43°58′18″N 91°16′40″W

Information
- Type: Public Secondary
- Established: 1912 (Union Free High School of the Towns of Holland and Onalaska)
- School district: School District of Holmen
- Superintendent: Kristin Mueller
- Principal: Wayne Sackett
- Teaching staff: 84.81 (FTE)
- Grades: 9-12
- Gender: Co-educational
- Enrollment: 1,212 (2022-23)
- Student to teacher ratio: 14.29
- Campus type: Suburb
- Colors: Maroon and Silver
- Song: Holmen Fight Song
- Fight song: Notre Dame Victory March
- Athletics conference: Mississippi Valley
- Mascot: Victor Viking
- Nickname: Vikings
- Rival: Onalaska, Aquinas
- Newspaper: The Viking Voice
- Yearbook: The Viking
- Website: hhs.holmen.k12.wi.us

Holmen High School is a high school in Holmen, Wisconsin operated by the Holmen School District. As of 2026, school enrollment is 1,242 to 1,246 students, serving grades 9 through 12. The current facility was opened in 1994 and was expanded in 2000. 2020 led to another expansion after a referendum passed in 2025. Holmen High School is a WIAA Division 1 school in sports and is a North Central Association Renaissance School.

== Academics ==
Holmen High School offers Advanced Placement classes.

Holmen High is an NCA/Renaissance School. The Renaissance Program is an academic recognition/reward program in which students are recognized for their academic efforts by academic letters, plaques, and certificates; coupons from local businesses; parking privileges; special academic pep assemblies; and other incentives. Over 20 local businesses support the Renaissance Program. Students are also recognized for their academic commitment and achievements in the Renaissance Program through the Maroon high honor roll and White honor roll. Maroon high honor roll students must have a GPA between 3.67 and 4.33, and White honor roll students much have a GPA between 3.00 and 3.66.

== Athletics ==
The school's sports teams have won five Wisconsin state titles: summer baseball, 1990; girls’ basketball 1995; softball 1999; and gymnastics in 2005 and 2006. The gymnastics team came in third at the 2007 state championships, falling short in their attempt to win a third consecutive Division 2 title.

=== Athletic conference affiliation history ===
- Coulee Conference (1926–1989)
- Mississippi Valley Conference (1989–present)

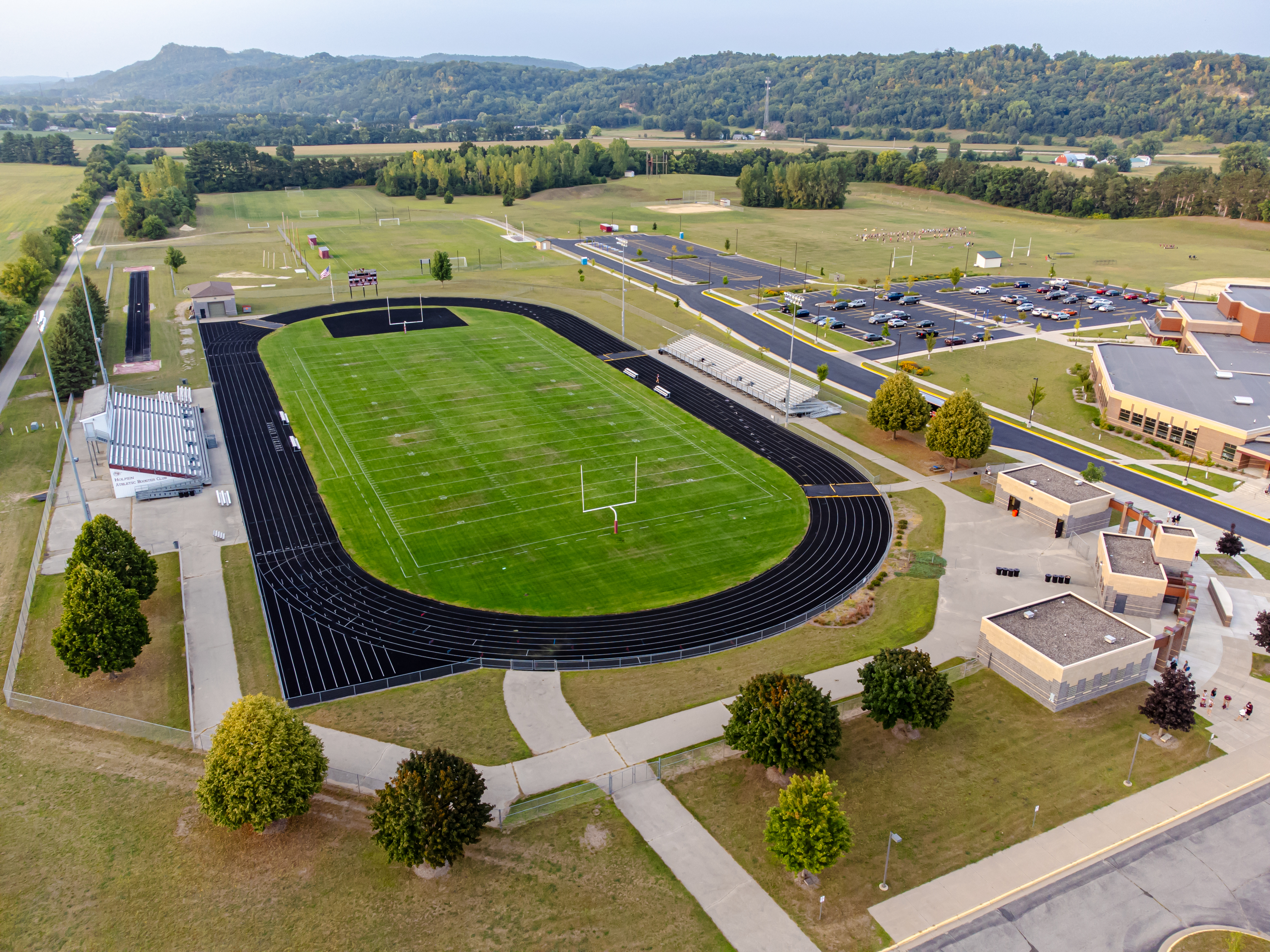
Holmen athletic fields

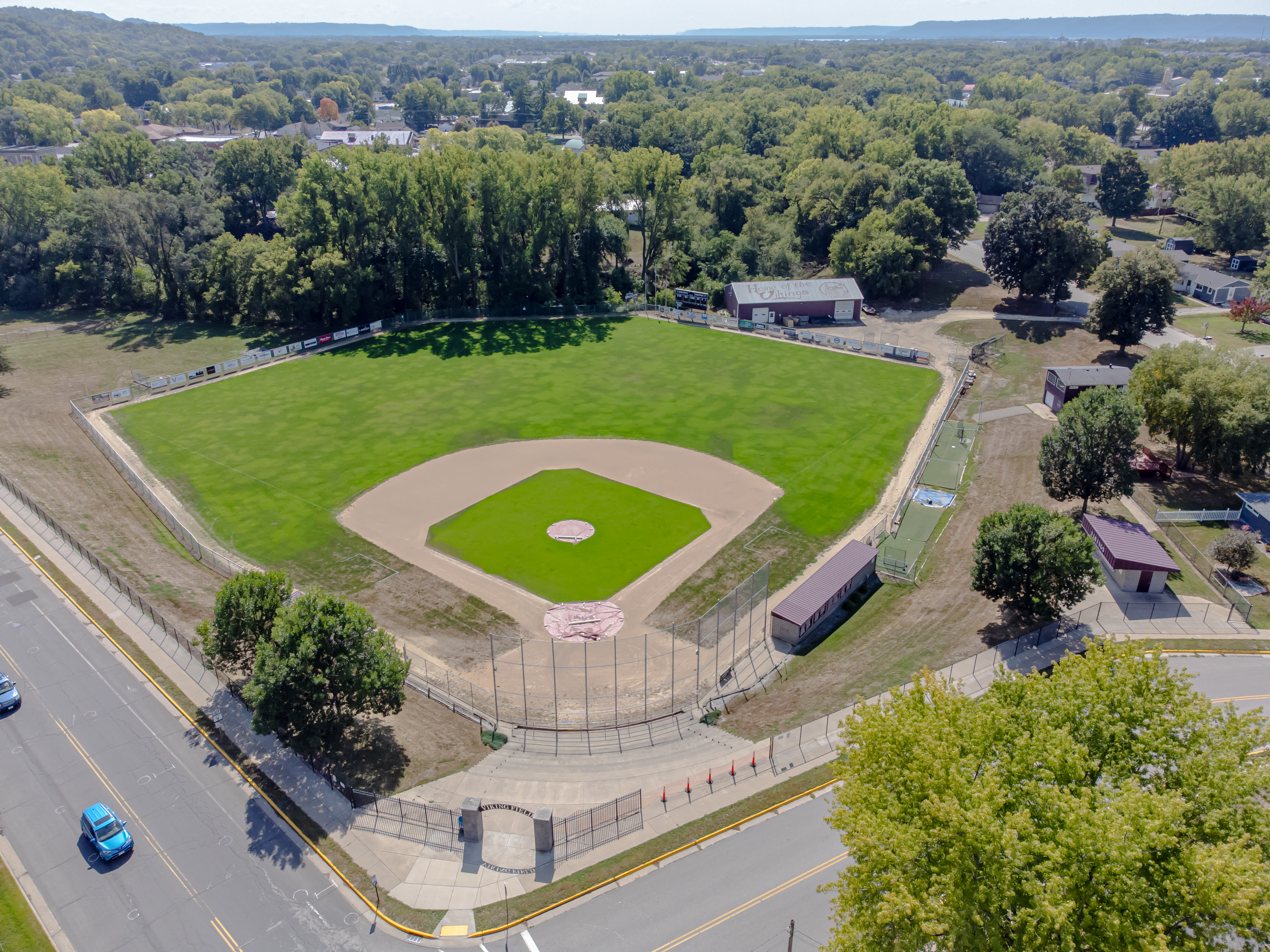
Holmen baseball field

== Extracurricular activities ==
HHS has two competitive show choirs, a unisex women's group called Midwest Magic and a mixed group called Midwest Express. Both Express and Magic have won numerous awards in their respective categories, as Express won two competitions in 2018. The choir program also hosts their own yearly competition, called Gathering of the Stars.

== Notable alumni ==
- Jeren Kendall (class of 2014), former baseball player
- Taylor Kohlwey (class of 2012), baseball player
- Fern P. Rathe (class of 1948), chemist
