= Q-Symbio =

Multi center clinical trial

The Q-Symbio study was an international multi-center clinical trial that was reported in the JACC: Heart Failure in September 2014.

Professor Mortensen and a team of researchers enrolled 420 patients with moderate to severe chronic heart failure. Half of the patients received a Coenzyme Q10 treatment of 100 milligrams three times daily for two years. The other half of the patients got inactive placebo capsules daily for two years. All of the patients continued their standard heart failure medications.

Not until the end of the clinical trial did the researchers and the patients find out which patients were receiving the active Coenzyme Q10 treatment and which patients were receiving the placebo treatment.

The patients in the Coenzyme Q10 treatment group had significantly reduced risk of heart disease death and death from all causes and significantly fewer hospital stays for heart failure complications.

A later sub-analysis including only the European segment of the Q-Symbio Study showed that the Coenzyme Q10 therapy was also positively associated with a significant improvement in ejection fraction. The results of the Coenzyme Q10 treatment were even more impressive in the European sub-study. Treatment with Coenzyme Q10 300 milligrams per day in addition to conventional heart failure medications was safe, well tolerated, and effective at reducing symptoms and improving survival rates of chronic heart failure patients.

== Purpose ==
The Q-Symbio study was a multi-center randomized placebo-controlled double-blind clinical trial that was reported in the JACC: Heart Failure in September 2014. The purpose of the study was to assess the effect of the adjuvant therapy drug Coenzyme Q10 on several short-term and long-term endpoints in a total of 420 chronic heart failure patients enrolled in 17 cardiology centers in Europe, Asia, and Australia from 2003 to 2010.

The trial name Q-SYMBIO reflects the focus on the following elements in the clinical trial: Q = Q10 and SYMBIO = SYMptoms, BIomarker status [Brain-Natriuretic Peptide], and long-term Outcome [hospitalizations/mortality].

Professor Mortensen and a team of researchers assigned 420 patients with moderate to severe chronic heart failure to Coenzyme Q10 100 milligrams three times daily or matching placebos in addition to the patients' standard heart failure therapies for two years. The patients in the Coenzyme Q10 adjunctive treatment group had significantly fewer major adverse cardiovascular events, significantly reduced risk of cardiovascular death and all-cause death, and significantly fewer hospital stays for heart failure complications.

== Dosage ==
The dosage of CoQ10 administered to the active treatment arm of the Q-SYMBIO trial was 100 milligrams three times daily, a dosage large enough to raise blood serum levels of Q10 significantly.

== Patients ==
The patients were selected for the Q-SYMBIO trial if they had chronic heart failure in New York Heart Association functional classes III (marked limitation of physical activity) or IV (unable to carry out any physical activity without discomfort).

The age of the patients in years was 62.3 +/- 12. The ratio of male patients to female patients was roughly three to one.

The mean duration of heart failure was around three years in both arms of the trial, and the baseline ejection fraction and six-minute-walking-time distances were equal between the groups.

90% of the patients in the study were receiving angiotensin-converting enzyme inhibitors or angiotensin receptor blockers, and 75% of the patients in the study were receiving beta-blockers.

The dosages of the medications were only infrequently modified during the trial, so it is unlikely that minor changes in medication should have influenced the outcome of the trial.

== Short-Term Effects (16 weeks of treatment) ==
At week 16, there were improvements in NYHA classification, VAS score, and 6MWT (6-Minute Walk Test) in both treatment groups, but there were no significant differences between the groups. There was a trend with a 20% reduction of NT-proBNP in the CoQ10 group and a proportional rise of 12% in the placebo group.

Retrospectively, at this time cardiovascular deaths were already significantly lower in the CoQ10 group, but this was not a pre-specified endpoint at week 16.

== Long-Term Effects (106 weeks of treatment) ==
Major Adverse Cardiovascular Events

The number of Major Adverse Cardiovascular Events (MACE), which was the primary long-term endpoint in the trial, was statistically significantly fewer (p < 0.005) in the Q10 treatment arm (N = 30, 15%) than in the placebo arm (N = 57, 26%), corresponding to a 42.3% relative reduction in risk of MACE events.

Cardiovascular Mortality

The total number of cardiovascular deaths during the 106 weeks of the study was statistically significantly lower (p = 0.026) in the Q10 treatment arm (N = 18, 9%) than in the control arm (N = 34, 16%), a relative reduction of 43.8% in risk of cardiovascular death.

All-cause Mortality

Altogether, there were statistically significantly fewer (p = 0.018) deaths from all causes in the Q10 treatment arm (N = 21, 10%) than in the control arm (N = 39, 18%), a relative reduction of 44.4%.

Hospital Stays for Heart Failure

The number of hospital stays for heart failure during the 106 weeks was statistically significantly lower (p = 0.033) in the Q10 treatment arm (N = 17, 8%) as compared to the control arm (N = 31, 14%), a relative reduction of 42.8%.

== Discussion of the Results ==
Mortensen et al. hypothesize that the dosage (100 mg three times daily) and the formulation of the Q10 used in the Q-SYMBIO clinical trial may have resulted in the patients reaching a required "therapeutic threshold in serum and tissue of CoQ10" needed to reduce the number of major adverse cardiovascular events.

The formulation used in the trial has been demonstrated to have good bio-availability in controlled studies.

In 2019, AL Mortensen, FL Rosenfeldt, and KJ Filipiak evaluated the treatment effect of Coenzyme Q10 adjuvant treatment in the European sub-population of the Q-SYMBIO clinical trial. In the European sub-group, ejection fraction and NYHA classification improved significantly, and both all-cause and cardiovascular mortality decreased significantly.

The researchers concluded that the evidence from the European sub-group analysis re-affirms the evidence of the therapeutic efficacy of the CoQ10 adjuvant therapy despite the greater adherence to guideline-directed therapy in the European sub-group than in the entire group of chronic heart failure patients.

The European sub-group study provides confirmatory evidence that the treatment with 300 mg/day of Coenzyme Q10 in additional to conventional heart failure therapy is safe, well tolerated, and effective in improving the symptoms and survival of chronic heart failure patients.

== The Morisco Clinical Trial ==
The results of the Q-SYMBIO clinical trial build on the earlier results from the multi-center randomized placebo-controlled double-blind clinical trial that was reported in 1993 by Morisco et al. That study enrolled 641 congestive heart failure patients (again, patients classified NYHA III and IV) randomly in a placebo arm and in a Q10 treatment arm in which the patients received a daily dosage of 2 mg per kilogram of body weight for the period of a year. The study focused on the need of hospitalization and on the incidence of life-threatening arrhythmias, pulmonary edema, and cardiac asthma.

The number of patients in the Morisco study who required hospitalization for worsening heart failure was significantly smaller (p < 0.001) in the Q10 treatment arm (n = 73, 22.8%) than in the control arm (n = 118, 36.6%), a relative reduction of 37.7% in required hospitalizations.

Moreover, in the Morisco study, the number of the episodes of pulmonary edema (20/319, 6.3% versus 51/322, 15.8%) and cardiac asthma (97/319, 30.4% versus 198/322, 61.5%) was significantly reduced (p < 0.001) in the Q10 arm as compared to the control arm.

The Morisco study authors concluded that their results demonstrated that adjuvant treatment with CoQ10 in addition to conventional therapy significantly reduced the number of hospitalizations for worsening of heart failure and the incidence of serious complications in patients with chronic congestive heart failure.

== Meta-analyses of the Efficacy of Q10 in Heart Failure ==
Altogether, meta-analyses by Soja et al., Sander et al., and Fotino et al. have found significant improvements in ejection fraction. A total of 21 placebo-controlled trials have evaluated the efficacy of CoQ10 in heart failure, including Q-SYMBIO. Only three of these studies did not find any effects, and the outcome in those three trials could possibly be attributed to low compliance rates in the treatment arm or to flaws in the study design.

== Senior Citizens ==
It is known that the ability of the human body to synthesize CoQ10 declines with age and that it may therefore be necessary to supplement the diet of senior citizens with Q10. Alehagen et al. have reported on the results of the Kisel-10 study, a five-year prospective randomized double-blind placebo-controlled trial among Swedish citizens aged 70 to 88. 443 participants given combined supplementation of selenium and CoQ10 or a placebo.

There was a significant reduction (p = 0.015) of cardiovascular mortality in the Q10 treatment arm as compared with the placebo group (5.9% vs. 12.6%, a relative reduction of 53%). The long-term supplementation with a combination of 200 mg/day of CoQ10 capsules (Bio-Quinone 100 mg twice daily) and 200 μg/day of organic selenium yeast tablets (SelenoPrecise 200 μg) reduced cardiovascular mortality. The positive effects could also be seen in N-terminal pro b-type natriuretic peptide (NT-proBNP) levels and on echocardiography.

The significantly reduced mortality from heart disease associated with the combined Coenzyme Q10 and selenium treatment, compared to the placebo treatment, persisted during 12 years of follow-up. Professor Alehagen and his co-researchers carried out a number of sub-studies to investigate the mechanisms by which the combined supplementation reduced the risk of heart disease. They identified reduced bio-markers of oxidative stress, inflammation, and fibrosis as possible mechanisms explaining the study results.

== Individuals Taking Statins ==
Statins are known to block the biological pathway that produces both cholesterol and CoQ10. Oral Coenzyme Q10 supplements replace the lost CoQ10.

== Biological Mechanisms Explaining the Improvement of Heart Failure Symptoms ==
Mortensen et al. posit four explanations for the effect of Q10 on the improvement of symptoms and survival of chronic heart failure patients:

1. Additional available Q10 may improve the respiratory rate in heart cells.
2. Additional available Q10 may increase energy production in the heart muscle cells, thus impeding the "vicious metabolic cycle" in heart failure.
3. Additional available Q10 may increase the stability of the "mitochondrial permeability transition pore" and thereby protect the heart muscle against apoptotic cell death.
4. Additional available Q10 may improve endothelial function and may protect the heart muscle against ischemic damage
