= Karl August Folkers =

American biochemist (1906-1997)

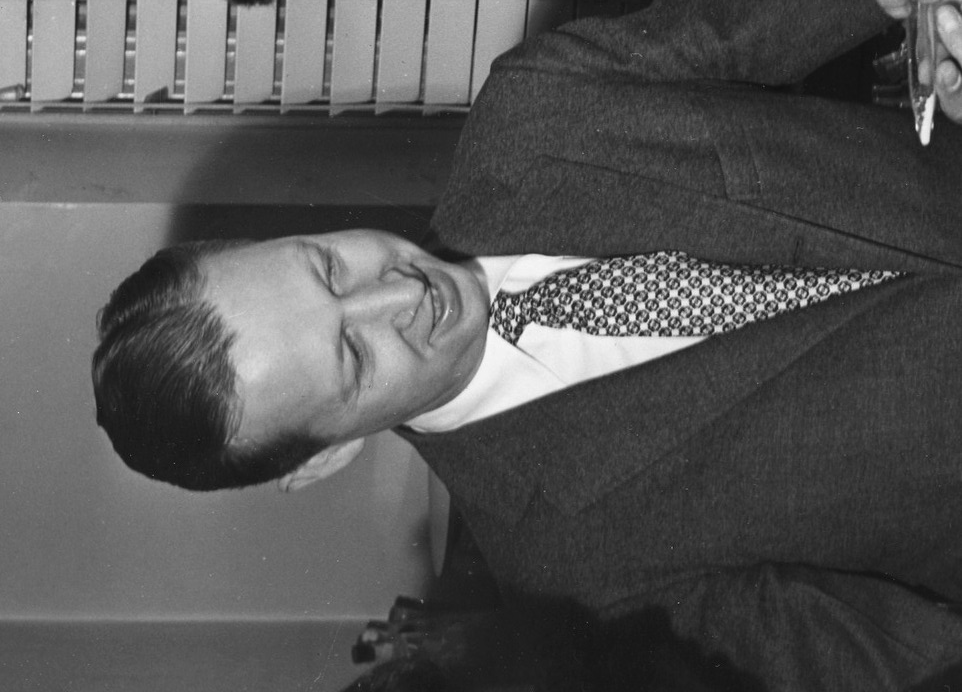
- Karl August Folkers
- Born: September 1, 1906; Decatur, Illinois
- Died: December 7, 1997 (aged 91); New London, Connecticut
- Known for: vitamin B_{12}
- Awards: ACS Award in Pure Chemistry (1941); Perkin Medal (1960); William H. Nichols Medal (1967); Welch Award (1972); Priestley Medal (1986); National Medal of Science (1990)
- Scientific career
- Fields: Biochemistry
- Workplaces: Merck; University of Texas at Austin

Karl August Folkers (September 1, 1906 – December 7, 1997) was an American biochemist who made major contributions to the isolation and identification of bioactive natural products.

== Career ==
Folkers graduated from the College of Liberal Arts and Sciences at the University of Illinois in 1928. In 1986, the institution awarded him its Alumni Achievement Award.

His career was mainly spent at Merck. He played a prominent role in the isolation of vitamin B_{12} in 1947, which is one of the most structural complex of the vitamins. As a Merck Pharmaceuticals research team, Folkers, Fern P. Rathe, and Edward Anthony Kaczka were the first to isolate the antibiotic cathomycin in 1955. His team also isolated the antibiotic cycloserine. In 1958 his Merck team determined the structure of coenzyme Q_{10}.

He later served as director of the Institute of Biomedical Research at the University of Texas at Austin, where he was also Ashbel Smith Professor of Chemistry.

In recognition for his scientific contributions, he received the Perkin Medal in 1960, the William H. Nichols Medal in 1967, the Priestley Medal in 1986, and the National Medal of Science in 1990.

== Legacy ==
The plant species Erythrina folkersii is named after Folkers.
