= 856 Conference =

Wisconsin high school football conference (1953-1956)

The 856 Conference is a former high school football conference with members in northwestern Wisconsin. Active from the 1953 through the 1956 season, the conference's members were affiliated with the Wisconsin Interscholastic Athletic Association.

== History ==
The 856 Conference was created by six small high schools in northwestern Wisconsin for the 1953 football season after the Dunn-St. Croix Conference suspended sponsorship of the sport. Four of its original members were affiliated with the Dunn-St. Croix (Boyceville, Elmwood, Hammond and Prescott) while the other two came from the Flambeauland Conference (Lake Holcombe and Tony). The 856 Conference sponsored eight-player football, a common variant used by smaller high schools in Wisconsin at that time. Somerset was added to the group in 1955 after the dissolution of the Northwest Border Conference, and the conference was briefly renamed the 857 Conference. The next year, Tony left for membership in the Lakeland Conference for football, and the 856 Conference competed for one more season after disbanding after its conclusion. The Dunn-St. Croix Conference resumed sponsorship of eight-player football at that time, and all six members of the 856 Conference landed there along with new arrival Plum City.

== Conference membership history ==
School	Location	Affiliation	Mascot	Colors	Seasons	Primary Conference
Boyceville	Boyceville, WI	Public	Bulldogs		1953–1956	Dunn-St. Croix
Elmwood	Elmwood, WI	Public	Raiders		1953–1956	Dunn-St. Croix
Hammond	Hammond, WI	Public	Bluejays		1953–1956	Dunn-St. Croix
Lake Holcombe	Lake Holcombe, WI	Public	Chieftains		1953–1956	Flambeauland
Prescott	Prescott, WI	Public	Cardinals		1953-1956	Dunn-St. Croix
Tony	Tony, WI	Public	Tornadoes		1953–1955	Flambeauland
Somerset	Somerset, WI	Public	Spartans		1955–1956	Dunn-St. Croix

== List of conference champions ==
School	Quantity	Years
Hammond	2	1955, 1956
Elmwood	1	1954
Prescott	1	1953
Boyceville	0	
Lake Holcombe	0	
Somerset	0	
Tony	0	
