= Dunn-St. Croix Conference =

Wisconsin high school athletic conference

The Dunn-St.Croix Conference is a high school athletic conference with its catchment in western Wisconsin. Founded in 1930, the conference and its member schools belong to the Wisconsin Interscholastic Athletic Association.

== History ==
=== 1930-1944 ===
Location of Original Dunn-St. Croix Conference Members

The Dunn-St. Croix Conference was formed in 1930 by eight small high schools in western Wisconsin: Baldwin, Boyceville, Downing, Elk Mound, Glenwood City, Hammond, Roberts and Woodville. The conference was named after the two counties (Dunn and St. Croix) that all eight original member schools were located in. Elk Mound left the conference in 1931 for membership in the Little Eight Conference, and the next year, Dunn County Agricultural School and Elmwood became Dunn-St. Croix Conference members. Football was added as a sponsored sport in 1934, and four members (Boyceville, Dunn County Aggies, Glenwood City and Roberts) made up the initial roster. Elk Mound returned to the Dunn-St. Croix in 1937 after the Little Eight Conference was folded, and the ten member schools subdivided into eastern and western divisions:

Eastern Division	Western Division
Boyceville	Baldwin
Downing	Elmwood
Dunn County Aggies	Hammond
Elk Mound	Roberts
Glenwood City	Woodville

In 1938, the Dunn-St. Croix Conference shifted from eleven-player to eight-player football league-wide, after the Dunn County Aggies made the switch the year prior. Sponsorship of interscholastic football was abandoned by the Dunn-St. Croix Conference during World War II, and would not make its return until several years later.

=== 1944-1960 ===
The Dunn-St. Croix Conference's two-division alignment lasted until 1944, when Downing High School was closed and redistricted to Glenwood City. In 1949, the ledger further shrunk to seven schools, as Baldwin and Glenwood City exited for membership in the Middle Border Conference. Prescott joined the Dunn-St. Croix Conference in 1951 to bring membership back up to eight schools, the same year the conference reinstated eight-player football as a sponsored sport. In 1953, the Dunn-St. Croix Conference suspended football sponsorship for a second time, and its members entered the new 856 Conference. A ninth school was added to the membership roster in 1955 when Somerset became members after leaving the Northwest Border Conference. In 1956, Elk Mound became members of the Cloverbelt Conference, and Plum City joined from the Bi-County League in 1957 to replace Dunn County Agricultural School after its closing. The Dunn-St. Croix Conference also reinstated sponsorship of football that year after the 856 Conference ceased operations.

=== 1960-1988 ===
In 1960, the high schools in Hammond and Roberts were combined to form the new St. Croix Central High School, inheriting their predecessors' place in the Dunn-St. Croix Conference. The next year, Woodville was merged with Baldwin, and the newly minted Baldwin-Woodville Area High School inherited Baldwin's Middle Border Conference membership. They were replaced by Arkansaw from the West Central Conference and Elk Mound from the Cloverbelt Conference, with the latter making their return to the Dunn-St. Croix after a five-year absence. Football also made the switch from eight-player to eleven-player in 1961, with several schools playing the regulation variant for the first time. Arkansaw's time in the Dunn-St. Croix Conference would be short-lived, as they returned to the West Central Conference in 1964. The conference accepted two new members in the second half of the 1960s, with Pepin joining from the West Central Conference and Colfax moving over from the Middle Border Conference. The 1970s began for the Dunn-St. Croix Conference with the exit of Prescott to the Middle Border Conference and two new schools joining in 1972: Glenwood City and Spring Valley. Both incoming schools came from the Middle Border with Glenwood City making its return to the conference after its exit in 1949. Membership remained stable for five years until 1977, when Somerset exited for membership in the Upper St. Croix Valley Conference. They were replaced by two former members returning to the Dunn-St. Croix: Arkansaw (West Central) and Prescott (Middle Border).

=== 1988-2002 ===
By 1988, two Dunn-St. Croix members based in Pepin County (Arkansaw and Pepin) saw enrollment dwindle to levels that would make further athletic competition unsustainable. The two schools entered into a cooperative agreement under the Pepin/Arkansaw banner that year, an arrangement that would last until Arkansaw was folded into Durand's school district in 1992. Two years later, Somerset made their return from the Upper St. Croix Valley Conference and Mondovi joined from the Middle Border Conference. The Dunn-St. Croix Conference was divided by enrollment into large schools and small schools for most sports that year:

Large Dunn-St. Croix	Small Dunn-St. Croix
Elk Mound	Boyceville
Glenwood City	Colfax
Mondovi	Elmwood
Prescott	Pepin
Somerset	Plum City
St. Croix Central	Spring Valley

=== 2002-present ===
In 2002, Prescott and Somerset both ended their second stints in the Dunn-St. Croix Conference when they both joined the Middle Border Conference, and the conference realigned as a single division. The Dunn-St. Croix Conference lost Pepin as members in 2009 when they entered into a cooperative athletic partnership with Alma and joined the Dairyland Conference. Elmwood and Plum City consolidated their athletic programs in 2014, with both schools staying in the conference. In 2016, St. Croix Central traded affiliations with Durand-Arkansaw, with the latter entering from the Middle Border Conference. The membership roster remained stable until 2025, when Elk Mound returned to the Cloverbelt Conference and two schools joined as their replacement: Chetek-Weyerhaeuser moved over from the Heart O'North Conference and Clear Lake of the Lakeland Conference.

=== Football (since 2020) ===
In February 2019, in conjunction with the Wisconsin Football Coaches Association, the WIAA released a sweeping football-only realignment for Wisconsin to commence with the 2020 football season and run on a two-year cycle. Four members were retained from the Dunn-St. Croix football roster (Boyceville, Colfax, Glenwood City and Spring Valley), and three new associate members were added (Cadott, Clear Lake and Turtle Lake) along with full members Elmwood/Plum City. This alignment was kept intact for the 2022-2023 competition cycle. For the 2024-2025 cycle, Cadott was shifted to the Lakeland Conference as football-only members, and the Dunn-St. Croix entered into a mandatory crossover scheduling partnership with the Lakeland. In 2026, McDonell Central Catholic and Osseo-Fairchild are set to replace Clear Lake and Turtle Lake, who are transitioning to eight-player football and membership in the North Central Conference.

== List of member schools ==
=== Current full members ===
School	Location	Affiliation	Enrollment	Mascot	Colors	Joined
Boyceville	Boyceville, WI	Public	214	Bulldogs		1930
Chetek-Weyerhaeuser	Chetek, WI	Public	247	Bulldogs		2025
Clear Lake	Clear Lake, WI	Public	168	Warriors		2025
Colfax	Colfax, WI	Public	205	Vikings		1967
Durand-Arkansaw	Durand, WI	Public	310	Panthers		2016
Elmwood/ Plum City	Elmwood, WI/ Plum City, WI	Public	168	Wolves		2014
Glenwood City (Note: Left the Dunn-St. Croix Conference in 1949, returned in 1972)	Glenwood City, WI	Public	186	Hilltoppers		1930, 1972
Mondovi	Mondovi, WI	Public	272	Buffaloes		1994
Spring Valley	Spring Valley, WI	Public	196	Cardinals		1972

=== Current associate members ===
School	Location	Affiliation	Mascot	Colors	Primary Conference	Sport(s)
McDonell Central Catholic	Chippewa Falls, WI	Private (Catholic)	Macks		Cloverbelt	Football
Osseo-Fairchild	Osseo, WI	Public	Thunder		Dairyland	Football

=== Former full members ===
School	Location	Affiliation	Mascot	Colors	Joined	Left	Conference Joined	Current Conference
Arkansaw	Arkansaw, WI	Public	Travelers		1961, 1977	1964, 1988	Dunn-St. Croix (coop with Pepin)	Closed in 1992 (merged into Durand-Arkansaw)
Baldwin	Baldwin, WI	Public	Blackhawks		1930	1949	Middle Border	
Downing	Downing, WI	Public	Midgets		1930	1944	Closed (consolidated into Glenwood City)	
Dunn County Agricultural	Menomonie, WI	Public	Aggies		1932	1957	Closed	
Elk Mound	Elk Mound, WI	Public	Mounders		1930, 1937, 1961	1931, 1956, 2025	Little Eight, Cloverbelt (twice)	Cloverbelt
Elmwood	Elmwood, WI	Public	Raiders		1932	2014	Dunn-St. Croix (coop with Plum City)	
Hammond	Hammond, WI	Public	Bluejays		1930	1960	Closed (merged into St. Croix Central)	
Plum City	Plum City, WI	Public	Blue Devils		1957	2014	Dunn-St. Croix (coop with Elmwood)	
Pepin	Pepin, WI	Public	Lakers		1966, 1992	1988, 2009	Dunn-St. Croix (coop with Arkansaw), Dairyland	Dairyland (coop with Alma)
Pepin/ Arkansaw	Pepin, WI/ Arkansaw, WI	Public	Wildcats		1988	1992	Cooperative ended when Arkansaw closed in 1992	
Prescott	Prescott, WI	Public	Cardinals		1951, 1977	1970, 2002	Middle Border (both times)	Middle Border
Roberts	Roberts, WI	Public	Eagles		1930	1960	Closed (merged into St. Croix Central)	
Somerset	Somerset, WI	Public	Spartans		1955, 1994	1977, 2002	Upper St. Croix Valley, Middle Border	Middle Border
St. Croix Central	Hammond, WI	Public	Panthers		1960	2016	Middle Border	
Woodville	Woodville, WI	Public	Vikings		1930	1961	Closed (merged into Baldwin-Woodville)	

=== Former football-only members ===
School	Location	Affiliation	Mascot	Colors	Seasons	Primary Conference
Cadott	Cadott, WI	Public	Hornets		2020-2023	Cloverbelt
Clear Lake	Clear Lake, WI	Public	Warriors		2020-2024	Lakeland
Durand-Arkansaw	Durand, WI	Public	Panthers		2015	Middle Border
Lake Holcombe	Lake Holcombe, WI	Public	Chieftains		1957-1964	Independent
Plum City/ Pepin	Plum City, WI	Public	Blue Devils		1992-1993	Dunn-St. Croix
Plum City/ Pepin/ Arkansaw	Plum City, WI	Public	Blue Devils		1991	Dunn-St. Croix
Prairie Farm	Prairie Farm, WI	Public	Panthers		1939	Lakeland
Tony	Tony, WI	Public	Tornadoes		1952	Flambeauland
Turtle Lake	Turtle Lake, WI	Public	Lakers		2020-2025	Lakeland
Unity	Balsam Lake, WI	Public	Eagles		2002-2006	Lakeland

== Membership timeline ==
=== Full members ===
Eastern Division Western Division Large Dunn-St. Croix Small Dunn-St. Croix

=== Football members ===
Large Dunn-St. Croix Small Dunn-St. Croix

== Membership map ==
Dunn-St. Croix Conference
Location of Dunn-St. Croix Conference full members:
1 Boyceville
2 Chetek-Weyerhaeuser
3 Clear Lake
4 Colfax
5 Durand-Arkansaw
6 Elmwood
7 Glenwood City
8 Mondovi
9 Plum City
10 Spring Valley

== Sponsored sports ==
	Baseball	Boys Basketball	Girls Basketball	Boys Cross Country	Girls Cross Country	Football	Boys Golf	Girls Golf (Note: Co-sponsored with the Cloverbelt Conference)	Softball	Boys Track & Field	Girls Track & Field	Girls Volleyball	Boys Wrestling	Girls Wrestling
Boyceville	●	●	●	●	●	●			●	●	●	●	●	●
Chetek-Weyerhaeuser	●	●	●	●	●		●		●	●	●	●	● (Note: Co-operative with Prairie Farm)	●
Clear Lake	●	●	●	●	●		●		●	●	●	●	● (Note: Co-operative with Clayton)	●
Colfax	● (Note: Co-operative with New Auburn)	●	●	●	●	●	●	●	●	●	●	●		
Durand-Arkansaw	●	●	●	●	●		●		●	●	●	●	●	●
Elmwood/Plum City	● (Note: Hosted by Plum City)	●	●	● (Note: Hosted by Elmwood)	●	●	●		●	●	●	●		
Glenwood City	●	●	●	●	●	●	●		●	●	●	●	●	●
Mondovi	●	●	●	●	●		●	●	●	●	●	●	● (Note: Co-operative with Eleva-Strum)	●
Spring Valley	●	●	●	●	●	●	●		●	●	●	●	● (Note: Co-operative with Elmwood)	●

== List of state champions ==
=== Fall sports ===
Boys Cross Country
School	Year	Division
Colfax	1998	Division 3
Durand-Arkansaw	2017	Division 3

Girls Cross Country
School	Year	Division
Spring Valley	2012	Division 3

Football
School	Year	Division
Spring Valley	1978	Division 5
Glenwood City	1985	Division 6
St. Croix Central	1988	Division 5
Glenwood City	1997	Division 5
Spring Valley	2000	Division 6
Spring Valley	2001	Division 6
Glenwood City	2012	Division 7

=== Winter sports ===
Boys Basketball
School	Year	Division
Colfax	1978	Class C
Spring Valley	1992	Division 4
Glenwood City	2001	Division 3

Boys Wrestling
School	Year	Division
St. Croix Central	1989	Class C
Boyceville	1996	Division 3
Elmwood/ Spring Valley	2015	Division 3

=== Spring sports ===
Baseball
School	Year	Division
Prescott	1994	Division 2
Elk Mound	1995	Division 3
Plum City	1997	Division 3
Boyceville	2021	Division 4

Softball
School	Year	Division
Elmwood	1977	Single Division
Elmwood	1984	Class C
Pepin	1995	Division 3
Pepin	1998	Division 3

Boys Track & Field
School	Year	Division
Glenwood City	1982	Class C

== List of conference champions ==
=== Boys Basketball ===
School	Quantity	Years
Elk Mound	26	1931, 1939, 1944, 1950, 1951, 1952, 1953, 1954, 1955, 1956, 1966, 1981, 1984, 1985, 1986, 1987, 1991, 1994, 1995, 1996, 1997, 2013, 2014, 2016, 2017, 2023
Glenwood City	20	1939, 1940, 1941, 1946, 1947, 1949, 1982, 1983, 1984, 1988, 1989, 1992, 1996, 1997, 1998, 2000, 2001, 2003, 2005, 2006
Colfax	14	1971, 1972, 1973, 1977, 1978, 1979, 1980, 1992, 1995, 1999, 2011, 2012, 2015, 2019
Elmwood	13	1934, 1935, 1936, 1937, 1939, 1940, 1957, 1962, 1964, 1974, 1976, 1993, 2007
Boyceville	11	1932, 1933, 1938, 1942, 1945, 1957, 1961, 1963, 1990, 2001, 2002
Spring Valley	8	1992, 1997, 1999, 2002, 2008, 2021, 2022, 2025
Baldwin	6	1938, 1941, 1942, 1944, 1945, 1948
Durand-Arkansaw	6	2018, 2020, 2022, 2024, 2025, 2026
St. Croix Central	6	1966, 1967, 1968, 1969, 1970, 2010
Prescott	4	1955, 1960, 1967, 2000
Mondovi	3	1998, 2004, 2009
Hammond	2	1947, 1957
Plum City	2	1958, 1965
Roberts	2	1953, 1955
Somerset	2	1975, 2000
Woodville	2	1946, 1959
Dunn County Aggies	1	1948
Plum City/ Elmwood	1	2015
Arkansaw	0	
Chetek-Weyerhaeuser	0	
Clear Lake	0	
Downing	0	
Pepin	0	
Pepin/ Arkansaw	0	

=== Girls Basketball ===
School	Quantity	Years
Colfax	23	1992, 1993, 1994, 1995, 1996, 1997, 1998, 1999, 2000, 2006, 2007, 2009, 2010, 2011, 2012, 2013, 2014, 2015, 2019, 2020, 2021, 2022, 2026
Elk Mound	8	1988, 1990, 2000, 2016, 2017, 2023, 2024, 2025
Pepin	6	1979, 1980, 1982, 1983, 1985, 1986
Boyceville	5	1984, 2002, 2003, 2004, 2005
Glenwood City	4	1990, 1991, 1992, 2002
Mondovi	4	1995, 1996, 1997, 2008
Spring Valley	4	1987, 1988, 1989, 2002
Durand-Arkansaw	3	2017, 2018, 2019
Plum City	2	1999, 2001
Prescott	2	1978, 1997
Somerset	2	1998, 2001
St. Croix Central	2	1981, 1998
Elmwood	1	1977
Arkansaw	0	
Chetek-Weyerhaeuser	0	
Clear Lake	0	
Pepin/ Arkansaw	0	
Plum City/ Elmwood	0	

=== Football ===
School	Quantity	Years
Elk Mound	17	1970, 1985, 1986, 1989, 1990, 1991, 1992, 1993, 1995, 1999, 2002, 2003, 2004, 2009, 2012, 2017, 2018
Glenwood City	15	1938, 1939, 1940, 1979, 1983, 1984, 1985, 1994, 1996, 1997, 1998, 2005, 2007, 2009, 2026
Spring Valley	15	1972, 1973, 1974, 1975, 1978, 1981, 2000, 2001, 2015, 2018, 2020, 2021, 2022, 2024, 2026
Boyceville	10	1936, 1937, 1942, 1951, 1952, 1962, 1967, 1999, 2023, 2025
St. Croix Central	10	1965, 1966, 1968, 1969, 1976, 1987, 1988, 2006, 2011, 2014
Mondovi	9	1997, 1998, 1999, 2001, 2008, 2010, 2013, 2018, 2019
Elmwood	9	1941, 1957, 1960, 1961, 1963, 1966, 1971, 1977, 1982
Prescott	4	1979, 1980, 1996, 2000
Somerset	4	1957, 1958, 1959, 1995
Colfax	3	1984, 1998, 2006
Dunn County Aggies	2	1934, 1935
Durand-Arkansaw	1	2016
Lake Holcombe	1	1964
Baldwin	0	
Cadott	0	
Clear Lake	0	
Elmwood/ Plum City	0	
Hammond	0	
Pepin	0	
Pepin/ Arkansaw	0	
Plum City	0	
Plum City/ Pepin	0	
Plum City/ Pepin/ Arkansaw	0	
Prairie Farm	0	
Roberts	0	
Tony	0	
Turtle Lake	0	
Unity	0	
Woodville	0	
