= Lakeland Conference (Wisconsin) =

Wisconsin high school athletic conference

The Lakeland Conference is a high school athletic conference consisting of seventeen members in northwestern Wisconsin. Founded in 1934, the conference and its member schools are all members of the Wisconsin Interscholastic Athletic Association.

== History ==
=== 1934-1957 ===
Location of Original Lakeland Conference Members

The Lakeland Conference was formed by seven small northwestern Wisconsin high schools in 1934: Cameron, Chetek, Clear Lake, New Auburn, Shell Lake, Turtle Lake, and Weyerhaeuser. Five of the original members of the Lakeland Conference were previously part of the Heart O'North Conference and left that conference due to growing size difference between the larger and smaller schools. All of the conference's original members were located in Barron, Chippewa, Polk, Rusk, and Washburn Counties. By the end of the decade, four new schools were added to the conference: Clayton in 1936, Bruce in 1937, Birchwood in 1938, and Prairie Farm in 1939. The next year, the Lakeland Conference split its eleven-member roster into Eastern and Western Sections:

Eastern Lakeland	Western Lakeland
Birchwood	Clayton
Bruce	Clear Lake
Cameron	Prairie Farm
Chetek	Shell Lake
New Auburn	Turtle Lake
Weyerhaeuser	

Football was sponsored for the first time in 1938, with four members (Bruce, Cameron, Chetek and Clear Lake) participating first in seven-player football before switching to eight-player football in 1939. Aside from Weyerhaeuser's exit to become a charter member of the Flambeauland Conference in 1946 and their subsequent return five years later, conference membership remained consistent for sixteen years. In 1956, the Lakeland Conference welcomed three new members who were displaced when their conferences ceased operations in 1955: Balsam Lake and Centuria from the Northwest Border Conference and Tony from the Flambeauland Conference. This expansion brought membership to fourteen schools in two divisions:

Eastern Lakeland	Western Lakeland
Birchwood	Balsam Lake
Bruce	Centuria
Cameron	Clayton
Chetek	Clear Lake
New Auburn	Prairie Farm
Tony	Shell Lake
Weyerhaeuser	Turtle Lake

=== 1957-1968 ===
The Lakeland Conference lost three member schools in 1957. Chetek joined with larger schools in the Heart O'North Conference, and Balsam Lake and Centuria merged with Milltown of the Upper St. Croix Valley Conference to form the new Unity High School (not to be confused with the former Unity High School in Unity, Wisconsin). The new school inherited Milltown's conference membership, and the conference was left with eleven schools in two sections:

Eastern Lakeland	Western Lakeland
Birchwood	Clayton
Bruce	Clear Lake
Cameron	Prairie Farm
New Auburn	Shell Lake
Tony	Turtle Lake
Weyerhaeuser	

Siren was accepted into the Lakeland Conference as its twelfth member in 1959 and took up residence in the Western section. Two years later, Tony would merge with Ingram-Glen Flora of the Flambeau League to form the new Flambeau High School, taking Tony's place in the Eastern Lakeland:

Eastern Lakeland	Western Lakeland
Birchwood	Clayton
Bruce	Clear Lake
Cameron	Prairie Farm
Flambeau	Shell Lake
New Auburn	Siren
Weyerhaeuser	Turtle Lake

In 1964, five Lakeland Conference members (Bruce, Clear Lake, Flambeau, Prairie Farm and Turtle Lake) made the transition to eleven-player football. Cameron joined them in 1966, and by 1967 the entire conference switched to eleven-player football, subdividing by enrollment size into two divisions.

=== 1968-1994 ===
In 1968, Winter joined the Lakeland Conference after leaving its former home in the Flambeau League, a conference which would break up two years later. Prentice would follow Winter's footsteps in 1970 after the disbandment of the Flambeau League. Lake Holcombe would also join the Eastern Lakeland in 1970, following a 5-year stint in the Cloverbelt. Cameron moved over to the Western section to accommodate the expansion:

Eastern Lakeland	Western Lakeland
Birchwood	Cameron
Bruce	Clayton
Flambeau	Clear Lake
Lake Holcombe	Prairie Farm
New Auburn	Shell Lake
Prentice	Siren
Weyerhaeuser	Turtle Lake
Winter	

Prentice left the Lakeland Conference in 1978 to take up residence in its current home, the Marawood Conference. Two years later, Northwood High School in Minong joined the Western section of the conference after leaving the Indianhead Conference.

=== 1994-2002 ===
The conference would operate with fifteen members until 1994, when four schools displaced by the ending of the Upper St. Croix Valley Conference entered the Lakeland: Frederic, Grantsburg, Luck and Webster. The Lakeland Conference realigned itself into a three-division conference that year:

Central Lakeland	Eastern Lakeland	Western Lakeland
Cameron	Birchwood	Frederic
Clayton	Bruce	Grantsburg
Clear Lake	Flambeau	Luck
Prairie Farm	Lake Holcombe	Northwood
Shell Lake	New Auburn	Siren
Turtle Lake	Weyerhaeuser	Webster
	Winter	

This alignment would only remain in place for two years before going back to a two-division format in 1996. Cornell became the Lakeland Conference's twentieth member school when it moved over from the Cloverbelt Conference in 1998 and was aligned to the Eastern division:

Eastern Lakeland	Western Lakeland
Birchwood	Clayton
Bruce	Clear Lake
Cameron	Frederic
Cornell	Grantsburg
Flambeau	Luck
Lake Holcombe	Northwood
New Auburn	Shell Lake
Prairie Farm	Siren
Weyerhaeuser	Turtle Lake
Winter	Webster

=== 2002-present ===
The Lakeland Conference returned to a three-division format in 2002 when it accepted two of the smaller schools from the Middle Border Conference as members (St. Croix Falls and Unity). Both schools joined the conference's Western division:

Central Lakeland	Eastern Lakeland	Western Lakeland
Cameron	Birchwood	Frederic
Clayton	Bruce	Grantsburg
Clear Lake	Cornell	Luck
Northwood	Flambeau	Siren
Prairie Farm	Lake Holcombe	St. Croix Falls
Shell Lake	New Auburn	Unity
Turtle Lake	Weyerhaeuser	Webster
	Winter	

This alignment would remain for nearly twenty years and was relatively stable in terms of membership. Weyerhaeuser merged with Chetek of the Heart O'North Conference in 2010 with the new school (Chetek-Weyerhaeuser) continuing Chetek's Heart O'North membership. For the 2012 football season, the Lakeland Conference subdivided into eight-player and eleven-player divisions, as eight members of the conference (Birchwood, Bruce, Luck, New Auburn, Northwood/Solon Springs, Prairie Farm, Siren and Winter) made the transition. Cameron and St. Croix Falls followed them to the Heart O'North in 2019 and 2021, respectively. The Lakeland Conference would also adopt its current two-division alignment that year. Membership decreased from nineteen to seventeen schools in 2025 when Clear Lake left for the Dunn-St. Croix Conference and Unity shifted to the Heart O'North Conference. Later that year, Clayton and Prairie Farm entered into a co-operative agreement for all sports to commence with the 2026-27 school year, adopting the Bearcats nickname as a nod to both schools. In September 2026, the WIAA fast-tracked the approval of longtime Cloverbelt members Gilman to join the Lakeland Conference for the 2027-28 school year.

== Conference membership history ==
=== Current full members ===
School	Location	Affiliation	Enrollment	Mascot	Colors	Joined	Division
Birchwood	Birchwood, WI	Public	70	Bobcats		1938	Eastern
Bruce	Bruce, WI	Public	104	Red Raiders		1937	Eastern
Cornell	Cornell, WI	Public	90	Chiefs		1998	Eastern
Flambeau	Tony, WI	Public	130	Falcons		1961	Eastern
Frederic	Frederic, WI	Public	114	Vikings		1994	Western
Grantsburg	Grantsburg, WI	Public	279	Pirates		1994	Western
Lake Holcombe	Lake Holcombe, WI	Public	75	Chieftains		1970	Eastern
Luck	Luck, WI	Public	106	Cardinals		1994	Western
New Auburn	New Auburn, WI	Public	99	Trojans		1934	Eastern
Northwood	Minong, WI	Public	93	Evergreens		1980	Western
Prairie Farm/ Clayton	Prairie Farm, WI/ Clayton, WI	Public	188	Bearcats		2026	Eastern
Shell Lake	Shell Lake, WI	Public	193	Lakers		1934	Western
Siren	Siren, WI	Public	96	Dragons		1959	Western
Turtle Lake	Turtle Lake, WI	Public	126	Lakers		1934	Western
Webster	Webster, WI	Public	204	Tigers		1994	Western
Winter	Winter, WI	Public	64	Warriors		1968	Eastern

=== Current associate members ===
School	Location	Affiliation	Mascot	Colors	Primary Conference	Sport(s)
Cadott	Cadott, WI	Public	Hornets		Cloverbelt	Football
Cameron	Cameron, WI	Public	Comets		Heart O'North	Football
Chetek-Weyerhaeuser	Chetek, WI	Public	Bulldogs		Dunn-St. Croix	Football
Ladysmith	Ladysmith, WI	Public	Lumberjacks		Heart O'North	Football
Unity	Balsam Lake, WI	Public	Eagles		Heart O'North	Football

=== Current co-operative members ===
Team	Colors	Host School	Co-operative Members	Sport(s)
LFGS Synergy		Luck	Frederic, Grantsburg, Siren	Boys Wrestling, Girls Wrestling
Wolfpack Wrestling		Cornell	Gilman, Lake Holcombe	Boys Wrestling, Girls Wrestling

=== Future full members ===
School	Location	Affiliation	Enrollment	Mascot	Colors	Joining	Former Conference
Gilman	Gilman, WI	Public	102	Pirates		2027	Cloverbelt

=== Former full members ===
School	Location	Affiliation	Mascot	Colors	Joined	Left	Conference Joined	Current Conference
Balsam Lake	Balsam Lake, WI	Public	Warriors		1956	1957	Closed (merged into Unity)	
Cameron	Cameron, WI	Public	Comets		1934	2019	Heart O'North	
Centuria	Centuria, WI	Public	Raiders		1956	1957	Closed (merged into Unity)	
Chetek	Chetek, WI	Public	Bulldogs		1934	1957	Heart O'North	Closed in 2010 (merged into Chetek-Weyerhaeuser)
Clayton	Clayton, WI	Public	Bears		1936	2026	Lakeland (Co-operative with Prairie Farm	
Clear Lake	Clear Lake, WI	Public	Warriors		1934	2025	Dunn-St. Croix	
Prairie Farm	Prairie Farm, WI	Public	Panthers		1939	2026	Lakeland (Co-operative with Clayton	
Prentice	Prentice, WI	Public	Buccaneers		1970	1978	Marawood	
St. Croix Falls	St. Croix Falls, WI	Public	Saints		2002	2021	Heart O'North	
Tony	Tony, WI	Public	Tornadoes		1956	1961	Closed (merged into Flambeau)	
Unity	Balsam Lake, WI	Public	Eagles		2002	2025	Heart O'North	
Weyerhaeuser	Weyerhaeuser, WI	Public	Wildcats		1934, 1951	1946, 2010	Flambeauland	Closed (merged into Chetek-Weyerhaeuser)

=== Former football-only members ===
==== 11-player ====
School	Location	Affiliation	Mascot	Colors	Seasons	Primary Conference
Birchwood/ Weyerhaeuser	Birchwood, WI	Public	Cats		1988-2009	Lakeland
Chetek	Chetek, WI	Public	Bulldogs		1991-1993	Heart O'North
Elmwood	Elmwood, WI	Public	Raiders		2002-2011	Dunn-St. Croix
Elmwood/ Plum City	Elmwood, WI	Public	Wolves		2012-2019	Dunn-St. Croix
Hurley	Hurley, WI	Public	Northstars		2020-2023	Indianhead
Lake Holcombe/ Cornell	Lake Holcombe, WI	Public	Knights		2013-2021	Lakeland
Northwood/ Solon Springs	Minong, WI	Public	Evergreens		2006, 2008-2011	Lakeland, Indianhead
Pepin	Pepin, WI	Public	Lakers		2002-2008	Dunn-St. Croix
Pepin/ Alma	Pepin, WI	Public	Eagles		2009-2018	Dairyland
Plum City	Plum City, WI	Public	Blue Devils		2002-2011	Dunn-St. Croix
Rib Lake/ Prentice	Rib Lake, WI	Public	Hawks		2020-2023	Marawood
Washburn/ Bayfield/ South Shore	Washburn, WI	Public	Castle Guards		2015-2016	Indianhead

==== 8-player ====
School	Location	Affiliation	Mascot	Colors	Seasons	Primary Conference
Alma Center Lincoln	Alma Center, WI	Public	Hornets		2017, 2019	Dairyland
Butternut/ Mercer	Butternut, WI	Public	Pioneers		2017-2021	Indianhead
Chequamegon	Park Falls, WI	Public	Screaming Eagles		2020-2021	Marawood
Chequamegon/ Butternut/ Mercer	Park Falls, WI	Public	Screaming Eagles		2022-2023	Marawood, Indianhead
Mellen	Mellen, WI	Public	Granite Diggers		2014-2023	Indianhead
Northwood/ Solon Springs	Minong, WI	Public	Evergreens		2012-2023	Lakeland, Indianhead
Phillips	Phillips, WI	Public	Loggers		2022-2023	Marawood
Valley Christian	Osceola, WI	Private (Christian)	Jaguars		2022-2023	Independent
Washburn	Washburn, WI	Public	Castle Guards		2020-2023	Indianhead
Washburn/ Bayfield	Washburn, WI	Public	Steelhead		2018-2019	Indianhead
Winter/ Birchwood	Winter, WI	Public	WarCats		2017-2023	Lakeland

== Membership timeline ==
=== Full members ===
Eastern Division Western Division Central Division

=== Football members ===
==== 8-player (1938-1966) ====
Eastern Lakeland Western Lakeland

==== 11-player (1964-present) ====
Large Lakeland Small Lakeland South Lakeland North Lakeland

==== 8-player (2012-2023) ====
Large Lakeland Small Lakeland East Lakeland West Lakeland

== Membership map ==
Lakeland Conference
Location of Lakeland Conference full members:
1 Birchwood
2 Bruce
3 Clayton
4 Cornell
5 Flambeau
6 Frederic
7 Grantsburg
8 Lake Holcombe
9 Luck
10 New Auburn
11 Northwood
12 Prairie Farm
13 Shell Lake
14 Siren
15 Turtle Lake
16 Webster
17 Winter

== Sanctioned sports ==
	Baseball	Boys Basketball	Girls Basketball	Boys Cross Country	Girls Cross Country	Football	Boys Golf	Softball	Boys Track & Field	Girls Track & Field	Girls Volleyball	Boys Wrestling	Girls Wrestling
Birchwood		● (Note: Co-operative with Birchwood)	●	●	●		●	● (Note: Co-operative with Winter)			●		
Bruce		●	●	●	●		●	● (Note: Co-operative with Ladysmith)	●	●	●	●	●
Cornell		●	●				● (Note: Co-operative with Lake Holcombe)		●	●	●	● (Note: Wolfpack Wrestling co-operative)	●
Flambeau	●	●	●	●	●		●	●	●	●	●	●	●
Frederic		●	●	● (Note: Co-operative with Luck)	●			●	●	●	●		
Grantsburg	●	●	●	●	●	●	●	●	●	●	●		
Lake Holcombe	● (Note: Co-operative with Cornell)	●	●	●	●			●			●		
Luck	● (Note: Co-operative with Frederic)	●	●				●				●	● (Note: LFGS Synergy co-operative)	●
New Auburn	●	●	●	●	●			●	●	●	●		
Northwood		●	●					● (Note: Co-operative with Solon Springs)			●		
Prairie Farm/ Clayton	● (Note: Hosted by Clayton)	● (Note: Hosted by Prairie Farm)	●	●	●		●	●	●	●	●		
Shell Lake	●	●	●	●	●			●	●	●	●	●	●
Siren	●	●	●	●	●				●	●	●		
Turtle Lake		●	●	●	●		●		●	●	●	●	●
Webster	●	●	●	●	●	●	●	● (Note: Co-operative with Siren)	●	●	●		
Winter	●			●	●		●		●	●	●		

== List of state champions ==
=== Fall sports ===
Boys Cross Country
School	Year	Division
Webster	2008	Division 3

Football
School	Year	Division
Shell Lake	1980	Division 5
Turtle Lake	1988	Division 6
Shell Lake	1991	Division 6
Turtle Lake	1995	Division 6
Flambeau	1997	Division 6
Lake Holcombe	1998	Division 6
Shell Lake	2004	Division 7
Luck	2019	8-Player

Girls Volleyball
School	Year	Division
Clayton	1990	Division 4
Turtle Lake	1993	Division 4
Turtle Lake	1994	Division 4
Turtle Lake	1995	Division 4
Clayton	1996	Division 4
Grantsburg	2001	Division 3
Grantsburg	2009	Division 3
Clayton	2017	Division 4
Clear Lake	2019	Division 4

=== Winter sports ===
Girls Basketball
School	Year	Division
Flambeau	2000	Division 4
Flambeau	2006	Division 4
Flambeau	2007	Division 4
Flambeau	2008	Division 4

Boys Wrestling
School	Year	Division
Shell Lake	1988	Class C

=== Spring sports ===
Baseball
School	Year	Division
Flambeau	1980	Class C
Webster	2018	Division 3
Webster	2018	Division 3

Softball
School	Year	Division
Grantsburg	2006	Division 3
Grantsburg	2009	Division 3
Grantsburg	2022	Division 4

Boys Track & Field
School	Year	Division
Grantsburg	1997	Division 3

Girls Track & Field
School	Year	Division
Shell Lake	2007	Division 3
Webster	2022	Division 3

== List of conference champions ==
=== Boys Basketball ===
School	Quantity	Years
Clear Lake	28	1938, 1939, 1941, 1944, 1945, 1953, 1954, 1955, 1966, 1967, 1968, 1969, 1970, 1971, 1972, 1983, 1991, 1995, 2003, 2005, 2008, 2017, 2018, 2019, 2020, 2021, 2022, 2025
Flambeau	21	1962, 1964, 1971, 1981, 1985, 1986, 1987, 1988, 1989, 1991, 1992, 1998, 1999, 2000, 2001, 2002, 2010, 2011, 2019, 2022, 2026
Cameron	19	1944, 1945, 1947, 1948, 1951, 1961, 1965, 1968, 1973, 1974, 1975, 1976, 1978, 1980, 2007, 2014, 2015, 2016, 2017
Shell Lake	16	1947, 1948, 1949, 1950, 1951, 1952, 1956, 1958, 1959, 1962, 1963, 1972, 1975, 1984, 1986, 1987
Turtle Lake	14	1943, 1953, 1955, 1960, 1961, 1964, 1965, 1968, 1988, 1992, 1993, 1996, 1997, 2006
Clayton	13	1942, 1946, 1947, 1951, 2000, 2001, 2002, 2004, 2009, 2010, 2011, 2012, 2013
Chetek	11	1941, 1942, 1946, 1949, 1950, 1951, 1952, 1953, 1954, 1955, 1956
New Auburn	10	1936, 1937, 1939, 1940, 1944, 1979, 2012, 2015, 2016, 2025
Winter	10	1973, 1980, 1981, 1982, 1984, 1990, 1992, 1994, 1996, 2024
Bruce	9	1957, 1958, 1960, 1964, 1967, 1969, 1971, 2013, 2021
Prairie Farm	9	1957, 1976, 1977, 1979, 1988, 1989, 1994, 2001, 2023
Unity	9	2003, 2005, 2014, 2015, 2016, 2017, 2020, 2023, 2024
Webster	7	1995, 1996, 1999, 2000, 2008, 2018, 2019
Weyerhaeuser	7	1935, 1959, 1962, 1963, 1964, 1966, 1970
Birchwood	6	1943, 1965, 1995, 1997, 2003, 2020
Cornell	6	2004, 2006, 2007, 2009, 2014, 2017
Luck	6	2007, 2008, 2009, 2010, 2011, 2013
Prentice	6	1972, 1974, 1975, 1976, 1977, 1978
Grantsburg	5	2004, 2005, 2013, 2018, 2021
Siren	5	1966, 1967, 1985, 1990, 2012
Lake Holcombe	4	1993, 2005, 2008, 2018
Northwood	2	1982, 2003
Frederic	1	2015
St. Croix Falls	1	2006
Balsam Lake	0	
Centuria	0	
Prairie Farm/ Clayton	0	
Tony	0	
Eastern Lakeland champions from 1981 unknown

=== Girls Basketball ===
School	Quantity	Years
Flambeau	38	1980, 1981, 1982, 1983, 1984, 1985, 1986, 1988, 1989, 1990, 1992, 1993, 1994, 1995, 1996, 1998, 1999, 2000, 2001, 2002, 2003, 2004, 2005, 2006, 2007, 2008, 2009, 2010, 2011, 2013, 2014, 2015, 2016, 2017, 2018, 2019, 2020, 2021
Clayton	18	1994, 1995, 1996, 1997, 1999, 2000, 2001, 2002, 2004, 2005, 2006, 2007, 2008, 2009, 2016, 2017, 2019, 2025
St. Croix Falls	10	2003, 2004, 2006, 2012, 2013, 2014, 2017, 2018, 2019, 2020
Cameron	9	1989, 1990, 1994, 2003, 2012, 2013, 2014, 2015, 2018
Turtle Lake	8	1983, 1984, 1985, 1986, 1987, 1988, 1992, 2023
Siren	7	2007, 2008, 2009, 2010, 2011, 2014, 2016
Clear Lake	6	1990, 1991, 1992, 1998, 2020, 2024
Bruce	4	1979, 1984, 1995, 2004
Luck	4	1996, 2002, 2005, 2010
New Auburn	4	1997, 2024, 2025, 2026
Northwood	4	2009, 2010, 2011, 2022
Prairie Farm	4	1991, 2021, 2022, 2023
Shell Lake	3	1993, 2001, 2025
Winter	3	1984, 1987, 2012
Grantsburg	2	1996, 2007
Lake Holcombe	2	1982, 1991
Webster	2	1995, 2026
Frederic	1	2015
Unity	1	2021
Weyerhaeuser	1	1993
Birchwood	0	
Cornell	0	
Prairie Farm/ Clayton	0	
Prentice	0	
Eastern Lakeland champions pre-1979 and Western Lakeland champions pre-1983 unknown

=== Football ===
==== 8-player (1938-1966) ====
School	Quantity	Years
Weyerhaeuser	6	1956, 1957, 1958, 1962, 1964, 1965
Cameron	5	1938, 1940, 1946, 1948, 1950
Prairie Farm	5	1955, 1956, 1957, 1958, 1959
Shell Lake	5	1939, 1945, 1949, 1951, 1960
New Auburn	4	1957, 1959, 1960, 1961
Clear Lake	4	1953, 1954, 1962, 1963
Turtle Lake	3	1942, 1952, 1961
Chetek	2	1941, 1947
Bruce	1	1963
Siren	1	1966
Balsam Lake	0	
Birchwood	0	
Centuria	0	
Clayton	0	
Flambeau	0	
Tony	0	
Champions from 1943-1944 unknown

==== 11-player (1964-present) ====
School	Quantity	Years
Clear Lake	17	1964, 1965, 1968, 1971, 1979, 1982, 1984, 1985, 1986, 1987, 1993, 1994, 2007, 2008, 2010, 2017, 2018
Lake Holcombe	15	1970, 1979, 1982, 1984, 1987, 1988, 1989, 1990, 1992, 1993, 1998, 1999, 2001, 2002, 2004
Grantsburg	11	2003, 2004, 2015, 2016, 2017, 2018, 2022, 2023, 2024, 2025, 2026
Turtle Lake	11	1964, 1969, 1970, 1977, 1978, 1988, 1989, 1990, 1992, 2001, 2016
Shell Lake	10	1980, 1981, 1991, 2003, 2004, 2005, 2006, 2007, 2008, 2010
Flambeau	9	1971, 1987, 1996, 1997, 1998, 1999, 2000, 2002, 2009
New Auburn	9	1967, 1969, 1972, 1974, 1975, 1985, 1994, 1995, 2001
Prairie Farm	9	1967, 1970, 1977, 1978, 1986, 1987, 1990, 1992, 2000
Clayton	8	1967, 1973, 1976, 1983, 1990, 1991, 2011, 2012
Cameron	7	1967, 1973, 1975, 1977, 1988, 2007, 2012
Bruce	6	1964, 1966, 1967, 1972, 1987, 1995
Plum City	6	2005, 2006, 2007, 2008, 2009, 2010
Luck	5	1995, 1996, 1997, 1998, 2001
Pepin/ Alma	4	2013, 2014, 2015, 2016
Prentice	4	1972, 1974, 1976, 1977
St. Croix Falls	3	2005, 2008, 2011
Webster	3	2008, 2009, 2013
Birchwood	2	1968, 1980
Elmwood	2	2003, 2004
Frederic	2	2011, 2014
Hurley	2	2020, 2021
Birchwood/ Weyerhaeuser	1	2002
Elmwood/ Plum City	1	2016
Northwood	1	1981
Pepin	1	2004
Siren	1	1971
Unity	1	2019
Cadott	0	
Chetek	0	
Chetek-Weyerhaeuser	0	
Cornell	0	
Ladysmith	0	
Lake Holcombe/ Cornell	0	
Northwood/ Solon Springs	0	
Rib Lake/ Prentice	0	
Washburn/ Bayfield/ South Shore	0	
Weyerhaeuser	0	
Winter	0	

==== 8-player (2012-2023) ====
School	Quantity	Years
Prairie Farm	7	2012, 2013, 2014, 2015, 2016, 2017, 2021
Luck	5	2016, 2017, 2018, 2019, 2021
Shell Lake	3	2018, 2019, 2020
Phillips	2	2022, 2023
Siren	2	2018, 2022
Clayton	1	2023
Mellen	1	2020
Northwood/ Solon Springs	1	2018
Alma Center Lincoln	0	
Birchwood	0	
Bruce	0	
Butternut/ Mercer	0	
Chequamegon	0	
Chequamegon/ Butternut/ Mercer	0	
Frederic	0	
New Auburn	0	
Valley Christian	0	
Washburn	0	
Washburn/ Bayfield	0	
Winter/ Birchwood	0	
