= Middle Border Conference =

Wisconsin high school athletic conference

The Middle Border Conference is a high school athletic conference with its membership base concentrated in western Wisconsin. Formed in 1931, the conference is composed entirely of public schools and is affiliated with the Wisconsin Interscholastic Athletic Association.

== History ==
=== 1931-1967 ===
Location of Original Middle Border Conference Members

The Middle Border Conference was founded in 1931 by seven small- to medium-sized high schools on the outskirts of the Minneapolis-St. Paul metropolitan area in western Wisconsin: Colfax, Ellsworth, Hudson, Menomonie, New Richmond, River Falls and Spring Valley. Baldwin and Glenwood City joined the Middle Border in 1949 to bring membership to nine schools. Chippewa Falls was also rumored to be joining the conference as the tenth member but not accepted due to their enrollment size being larger than their potential new rivals. The Middle Border's membership roster decreased to eight when Menomonie left the conference to compete as an independent after the 1951 football season. Several years later, they would become members of the Big Rivers Conference.

=== 1967-1989 ===
Membership in the Middle Border Conference would remain stable until 1967, when Colfax left to compete with smaller schools in the Dunn-St. Croix Conference. They were replaced by Durand, who were competing as independents after the collapse of the original Mississippi Valley Conference two years prior. The addition of Mondovi and Prescott in 1970 briefly brought the Middle Border Conference to ten members, until the exit of Glenwood City and Spring Valley for the Dunn-St. Croix Conference in 1972. They were followed by Prescott in 1977, and Amery (formerly of the Upper St. Croix Valley Conference) took their place to keep the roster at eight schools. Membership stayed at eight schools for just over another decade.

=== 1989-1998 ===
By the end of the 1980s, two members of the Middle Border Conference (Hudson and River Falls) had grown to the point where they were the largest schools in the conference. They were both invited to join the Big Rivers Conference in 1989 to compete with other schools more comparable in enrollment size. Bloomer moved over from the Heart O'North Conference to take their place and bring the Middle Border to seven schools. This figure would return to eight in 1994, after the loss of two schools (Bloomer returning to the Heart O'North and Mondovi joining the Dunn-St. Croix) and the addition of three schools from the defunct Upper St. Croix Valley Conference (Osceola, St. Croix Falls and Unity). That same year, the Middle Border Conference joined forces with the Heart O'North Conference to create the eighteen-member Northwest Football League, the first of its kind in the state of Wisconsin:

| Red Conference | White Conference | Blue Conference |
|---|---|---|
| Amery | Barron | Baldwin-Woodville |
| Durand-Arkansaw | Bloomer | Chetek |
| Ellsworth | Ladysmith | Cumberland |
| Hayward | Northwestern | Mondovi |
| New Richmond | Osceola | Prescott |
| Spooner | Unity | St. Croix Falls |

This arrangement lasted for two seasons until the Northwest Football League was dissolved due to dissatisfaction about long travel distances among conference members. The Heart O'North Conference and Middle Border Conference resumed sponsoring their own football conferences for the 1996 season.

=== 1998-present ===
As part of the 1994 realignment plan, New Richmond was kept in the Middle Border Conference but was due to move into the Big Rivers Conference by 1998 due to projected growth in the district. While the district did experience growth, it wasn't to the level expected and their stay in the Big Rivers would only last for four years before returning to the Middle Border in 2002. They were joined by two schools who exited the Dunn-St. Croix Conference: Prescott (who were previously members from 1970-1977) and Somerset. Their addition offset the loss of St. Croix Falls and Unity to the Lakeland Conference that year. Durand-Arkansaw left to become members of the Dunn-St. Croix Conference in 2016, exchanging affiliations with St. Croix Central in Hammond. New Richmond returned to the Big Rivers Conference in 2021, and longtime Cloverbelt Conference members Altoona joined the Middle Border as their replacement.

=== Football (since 2020) ===
In February 2019, in conjunction with the Wisconsin Football Coaches Association, the WIAA released a sweeping football-only realignment for Wisconsin to commence with the 2020 football season and run on a two-year cycle. The Middle Border Conference's membership roster was kept intact for football with the exception of New Richmond joining the Big Rivers Conference in 2020, with full membership coming in the next year. The conference also entered into a scheduling alliance with the Coulee Conference that would provide one mandatory crossover game for each member. For the 2022-2023 realignment cycle, the Coulee Conference partnership was ended, and Rice Lake was added as an associate member from the Big Rivers Conference to bring the roster to eight schools. In 2024, Rice Lake made their return to the Big Rivers Conference with full members Altoona shifting over from the Coulee Conference as their replacement. This alignment is set to remain in place through at least the 2027 football season.

== List of conference members ==
=== Current full members ===
| School | Location | Affiliation | Enrollment | Mascot | Colors | Joined |
|---|---|---|---|---|---|---|
| Altoona | Altoona, WI | Public | 560 | Railroaders | | 2021 |
| Amery | Amery, WI | Public | 387 | Warriors | | 1977 |
| Baldwin-Woodville | Baldwin, WI | Public | 546 | Blackhawks | | 1949 |
| Ellsworth | Ellsworth, WI | Public | 503 | Panthers | | 1931 |
| Osceola | Osceola, WI | Public | 476 | Chieftains | | 1994 |
| Prescott | Prescott, WI | Public | 375 | Cardinals | | 1970, 2002 |
| Somerset | Somerset, WI | Public | 455 | Spartans | | 2002 |
| St. Croix Central | Hammond, WI | Public | 497 | Panthers | | 2016 |

=== Current associate members ===
| School | Location | Affiliation | Mascot | Colors | Primary Conference | Sport(s) |
|---|---|---|---|---|---|---|
| Ashland | Ashland, WI | Public | Oredockers | | Heart O'North | Boys Hockey (Note: Co-operative with Hurley, Ironwood (MI) and Washburn) |
| Bloomer | Bloomer, WI | Public | Blackhawks | | Cloverbelt | Girls Tennis |
| Hayward | Hayward, WI | Public | Hurricanes | | Heart O'North | Boys Hockey (Note: Co-operative with Lac Courte Oreilles) |
| Mondovi | Mondovi, WI | Public | Buffaloes | | Dunn-St. Croix | Girls Tennis |
| Regis | Eau Claire, WI | Private (Catholic) | Ramblers | | Cloverbelt | Boys Tennis, Girls Tennis |
| Spooner | Spooner, WI | Public | Rails | | Heart O'North | Boys Hockey (Note: Co-operative with Shell Lake) |
| Unity | Unity, WI | Public | Eagles | | Heart O'North | Girls Tennis (Note: Co-operative with Luck) |

=== Current co-operative members ===
| Team | Colors | Host School | Co-operative Members | Sport(s) |
|---|---|---|---|---|
| Northwest Icemen | | Barron | Bloomer, Cameron, Chetek-Weyerhaeuser, Cumberland, Turtle Lake | Boys Hockey |
| RAM Hockey | | Altoona | Fall Creek, McDonell Central Catholic, Regis | Boys Hockey |

=== Former full members ===
| School | Location | Affiliation | Mascot | Colors | Joined | Left | Conference Joined | Current Conference |
|---|---|---|---|---|---|---|---|---|
| Bloomer | Bloomer, WI | Public | Blackhawks | | 1989 | 1994 | Heart O'North | Cloverbelt |
| Colfax | Colfax, WI | Public | Vikings | | 1931 | 1967 | Dunn-St. Croix | |
| Durand-Arkansaw | Durand, WI | Public | Panthers | | 1967 | 2016 | Dunn-St. Croix | |
| Glenwood City | Glenwood City, WI | Public | Hilltoppers | | 1949 | 1972 | Dunn-St. Croix | |
| Hudson | Hudson, WI | Public | Raiders | | 1931 | 1989 | Big Rivers | |
| Menomonie | Menomonie, WI | Public | Mustangs | | 1931 | 1951 | Independent | Big Rivers |
| Mondovi | Mondovi, WI | Public | Buffaloes | | 1970 | 1994 | Dunn-St. Croix | |
| New Richmond | New Richmond, WI | Public | Tigers | | 1931, 2002 | 1998, 2021 | Big Rivers | Big Rivers |
| River Falls | River Falls, WI | Public | Wildcats | | 1931 | 1989 | Big Rivers | |
| Spring Valley | Spring Valley, WI | Public | Cardinals | | 1931 | 1972 | Dunn-St. Croix | |
| St. Croix Falls | St. Croix Falls, WI | Public | Saints | | 1994 | 2002 | Lakeland | Heart O'North |
| Unity | Balsam Lake, WI | Public | Eagles | | 1994 | 2002 | Lakeland | Heart O'North |

=== Former football-only members ===
| School | Location | Affiliation | Mascot | Colors | Seasons | Primary Conference |
|---|---|---|---|---|---|---|
| Rice Lake | Rice Lake, WI | Public | Warriors | | 2022-2023 | Big Rivers |

== Membership map ==
Middle Border Conference
Location of Middle Border Conference full members:
1 Altoona
2 Amery
3 Baldwin-Woodville
4 Ellsworth
5 Osceola
6 Prescott
7 St. Croix Central
8 Somerset

== Sanctioned sports ==
| | Baseball | Boys Basketball | Girls Basketball | Boys Cross Country | Girls Cross Country | Football | Boys Golf | Girls Golf | Boys Hockey | Boys Soccer | Girls Soccer | Softball | Boys Tennis | Girls Tennis | Boys Track & Field | Girls Track & Field | Girls Volleyball | Boys Wrestling | Girls Wrestling |
|---|---|---|---|---|---|---|---|---|---|---|---|---|---|---|---|---|---|---|---|
| Altoona | ● | ● | ● | ● | ● | ● | ● | ● | ● (Note: RAM Hockey co-operative) | ● | ● | ● | ● | ● | ● | ● | ● | ● (Note: Co-operative with Regis) | ● |
| Amery | ● | ● | ● | ● | ● | ● | ● | ● | ● (Note: Co-operative with Clayton, Clear Lake and Unity) | ● | ● | ● | ● | ● | ● | ● | ● | ● | ● |
| Baldwin-Woodville | ● | ● | ● | ● | ● | ● | ● | ● | ● (Note: Co-operative with St. Croix Central) | ● | ● | ● | ● | ● | ● | ● | ● | ● | ● |
| Ellsworth | ● | ● | ● | ● | ● | ● | ● | ● | | | | ● | ● | ● | ● | ● | ● | ● | ● |
| Osceola | ● | ● | ● | ● | ● | ● | ● | ● | | ● | ● | ● | ● | ● | ● | ● | ● | ● | ● |
| Prescott | ● | ● | ● | ● | ● | ● | ● | ● | | | | ● | | | ● | ● | ● | ● | ● |
| Somerset | ● | ● | ● | ● | ● | ● | ● | ● | ● (Note: Co-operative with St. Croix Falls) | ● | ● | ● | | | ● | ● | ● | ● | ● |
| St. Croix Central | ● | ● | ● | ● | ● | ● | ● | ● | | ● | ● | ● | | | ● | ● | ● | ● | ● |

== List of state champions ==
=== Fall sports ===
Boys Cross Country
| School | Year | Division |
|---|---|---|
| Amery | 1997 | Division 2 |
| Amery | 1998 | Division 2 |

Football
| School | Year | Division |
|---|---|---|
| Baldwin-Woodville | 1987 | Division 4 |
| Ellsworth | 1990 | Division 3 |
| Baldwin-Woodville | 1992 | Division 4 |
| Somerset | 2002 | Division 5 |
| Somerset | 2012 | Division 4 |
| Somerset | 2014 | Division 4 |
| Osceola | 2015 | Division 4 |
| St. Croix Central | 2016 | Division 4 |

Girls Golf
| School | Year | Division |
|---|---|---|
| Prescott | 2020 | Division 2 |
| Prescott | 2021 | Division 2 |
| Prescott | 2022 | Division 2 |
| Prescott | 2023 | Division 3 |

=== Winter sports ===
Boys Basketball
| School | Year | Division |
|---|---|---|
| Prescott | 2018 | Division 3 |

Girls Basketball
| School | Year | Division |
|---|---|---|
| Durand | 1986 | Class B |
| Durand | 1987 | Class B |

Boys Wrestling
| School | Year | Division |
|---|---|---|
| Ellsworth | 1985 | Class B |
| Baldwin-Woodville | 1993 | Division 2 |
| Ellsworth | 2000 | Division 2 |
| Ellsworth | 2007 | Division 2 |
| Ellsworth | 2009 | Division 2 |
| Ellsworth | 2011 | Division 2 |
| Ellsworth | 2014 | Division 2 |
| Ellsworth | 2016 | Division 2 |
| Ellsworth | 2017 | Division 2 |
| Amery | 2021 | Division 2 |
| Amery | 2022 | Division 2 |

=== Spring sports ===
Baseball
| School | Year | Division |
|---|---|---|
| Prescott | 2012 | Division 2 |

Boys Golf
| School | Year | Division |
|---|---|---|
| New Richmond | 1992 | Division 2 |
| New Richmond | 1993 | Division 2 |
| Ellsworth | 2000 | Division 2 |

Softball
| School | Year | Division |
|---|---|---|
| Baldwin-Woodville | 2012 | Division 2 |
| Prescott | 2024 | Division 3 |

Boys Tennis
| School | Year | Division |
|---|---|---|
| Altoona | 2026 | Division 2 |

Boys Track & Field
| School | Year | Division |
|---|---|---|
| Hudson | 1973 | Class B |
| New Richmond | 1982 | Class B |
| Baldwin-Woodville | 1983 | Class C |
| Amery | 2001 | Division 2 |
| Osceola | 2004 | Division 2 |
| Osceola | 2005 | Division 2 |

Girls Track & Field
| School | Year | Division |
|---|---|---|
| Osceola | 2023 | Division 2 |

== List of conference champions ==
=== Boys Basketball ===
| School | Quantity | Years |
|---|---|---|
| New Richmond | 21 | 1958, 1965, 1966, 1972, 1973, 1974, 1976, 1985, 1986, 1987, 1988, 1992, 1993, 1994, 2008, 2009, 2010, 2011, 2012, 2019, 2020 |
| Hudson | 14 | 1937, 1956, 1960, 1963, 1964, 1965, 1975, 1977, 1978, 1979, 1984, 1985, 1987, 1989 |
| Prescott | 10 | 2014, 2015, 2016, 2017, 2018, 2019, 2020, 2022, 2024, 2026 |
| Durand-Arkansaw | 9 | 1970, 1971, 1977, 1978, 1999, 2000, 2001, 2006, 2013 |
| Baldwin-Woodville | 8 | 1959, 1988, 1997, 1998, 2002, 2003, 2007, 2012 |
| Amery | 6 | 1987, 1990, 1991, 1996, 2004, 2005 |
| Menomonie | 8 | 1935, 1938, 1940, 1941, 1943, 1945, 1947, 1950 |
| River Falls | 8 | 1934, 1944, 1946, 1948, 1949, 1955, 1966, 1967 |
| Spring Valley | 7 | 1932, 1935, 1936, 1939, 1942, 1961, 1962 |
| Ellsworth | 6 | 1951, 1968, 1981, 1982, 1983, 1995 |
| Osceola | 6 | 2000, 2009, 2023, 2024, 2025, 2026 |
| Colfax | 4 | 1933, 1952, 1953, 1954 |
| Glenwood City | 2 | 1957, 1969 |
| St. Croix Central | 2 | 2021, 2026 |
| Bloomer | 1 | 1991 |
| Mondovi | 1 | 1980 |
| Somerset | 1 | 2014 |
| Altoona | 0 | |
| St. Croix Falls | 0 | |
| Unity | 0 | |

=== Girls Basketball ===
| School | Quantity | Years |
|---|---|---|
| Durand-Arkansaw | 23 | 1973, 1978, 1981, 1982, 1983, 1984, 1985, 1986, 1987, 1991, 1994, 1996, 1997, 1998, 1999, 2001, 2006, 2007, 2008, 2009, 2010, 2012, 2015 |
| Baldwin-Woodville | 6 | 1976, 2013, 2014, 2024, 2025, 2026 |
| New Richmond | 6 | 1976, 1977, 1979, 1980, 2012, 2014 |
| Ellsworth | 5 | 1973, 1974, 1975, 1991, 1995 |
| Somerset | 5 | 2008, 2011, 2016, 2017, 2023 |
| Amery | 4 | 1999, 2000, 2011, 2019 |
| Bloomer | 4 | 1990, 1991, 1992, 1993 |
| Hudson | 4 | 1973, 1981, 1988, 1989 |
| Osceola | 4 | 2002, 2003, 2004, 2005 |
| Prescott | 3 | 2020, 2021, 2022 |
| St. Croix Central | 2 | 2018, 2025 |
| Altoona | 0 | |
| Mondovi | 0 | |
| River Falls | 0 | |
| St. Croix Falls | 0 | |
| Unity | 0 | |

=== Football ===
| School | Quantity | Years |
|---|---|---|
| River Falls | 21 | 1938, 1941, 1943, 1945, 1946, 1947, 1948, 1953, 1955, 1956, 1957, 1960, 1961, 1969, 1971, 1972, 1975, 1984, 1985, 1986, 1988 |
| Baldwin-Woodville | 16 | 1963, 1970, 1974, 1981, 1982, 1983, 1987, 1988, 1992, 2000, 2001, 2008, 2010, 2019, 2024, 2025 |
| Hudson | 11 | 1935, 1936, 1942, 1944, 1954, 1962, 1965, 1966, 1973, 1974, 1982 |
| Durand-Arkansaw | 10 | 1967, 1968, 1969, 1982, 1983, 1984, 1989, 2000, 2002, 2012 |
| Somerset | 9 | 2003, 2004, 2005, 2007, 2008, 2009, 2010, 2011, 2014 |
| New Richmond | 8 | 1940, 1941, 1964, 1991, 1993, 1997, 2010, 2019 |
| Ellsworth | 7 | 1977, 1990, 1999, 2013, 2020, 2021, 2022 |
| Colfax | 6 | 1931, 1932, 1935, 1937, 1939, 1952 |
| Mondovi | 6 | 1976, 1977, 1978, 1979, 1980, 1990 |
| Osceola | 6 | 2001, 2006, 2015, 2016, 2017, 2026 |
| Menomonie | 5 | 1933, 1934, 1949, 1950, 1951 |
| Amery | 3 | 1996, 2000, 2001 |
| Spring Valley | 3 | 1948, 1959, 1960 |
| Glenwood City | 1 | 1958 |
| Rice Lake | 1 | 2023 |
| St. Croix Central | 1 | 2018 |
| Unity | 1 | 1998 |
| Altoona | 0 | |
| Bloomer | 0 | |
| Prescott | 0 | |
| St. Croix Falls | 0 | |

=== Boys Hockey ===
| School | Quantity | Years |
|---|---|---|
| New Richmond | 15 | 2003, 2004, 2005, 2006, 2007, 2008, 2009, 2010, 2011, 2014, 2015, 2016, 2017, 2018, 2021 |
| Amery | 5 | 2012, 2020, 2023, 2024, 2025 |
| Baldwin-Woodville | 3 | 2019, 2022, 2023 |
| RAM Hockey | 2 | 2013, 2014 |
| Somerset | 1 | 2026 |
| Altoona | 0 | |
| Ashland | 0 | |
| Hayward | 0 | |
| McDonell Central Catholic/ Regis | 0 | |
| Northwest Icemen | 0 | |
| Spooner | 0 | |
| WSFLG Blizzard | 0 | |
