= Upper St. Croix Valley Conference =

Wisconsin high school athletic conference (1934-1994)

The Upper St. Croix Valley Conference is a former high school athletic conference in northwestern Wisconsin. Operational from 1934 to 1994, all conference members were public schools affiliated with the Wisconsin Interscholastic Athletic Association.

== History ==
=== 1934–1953 ===
Location of Original Upper St. Croix Conference Members

The Upper St. Croix Valley Conference was founded in 1934 by eleven small high schools in northwestern Wisconsin: Amery, Balsam Lake, Centuria, Clayton, Frederic, Grantsburg, Luck, Milltown, Osceola, St. Croix Falls and Webster. Original members of the conference were located in two counties (Polk and Burnett) whose western border is the St. Croix River and were subdivided into Northern and Southern sections:

Northern Section	Southern Section
Centuria	Amery
Frederic	Balsam Lake
Grantsburg	Clayton
Luck	Osceola
Milltown	St. Croix Falls
Webster	

Clayton left to join the Lakeland Conference in 1936, and the conference consolidated into a single division. In 1940, the five smallest schools in the conference (Balsam Lake, Centuria, Luck, Milltown and Webster) joined with Siren to form the Northwest Border Conference. Milltown returned to the Upper St. Croix Valley Conference in 1942, bringing the membership roster back up to six schools. In 1946, Luck followed Milltown out of the Northwest Border Conference to become the Upper St. Croix Valley's seventh member school. Webster reentered the conference from the Northwest Border Conference in 1953, bringing the total number of schools to eight.

=== 1953–1977 ===
Since Webster joined in 1953, there were relatively few changes to the roster, and the Upper St. Croix Valley Conference maintained an eight-member loop for the remainder of its existence. In 1957, Milltown was merged with two former Upper St. Croix Valley members in the Lakeland Conference (Balsam Lake and Centuria) to form Unity High School in Balsam Lake, and the new school inherited Milltown's place in the conference. Amery left the conference for membership in the Middle Border Conference in 1977 and were replaced by Somerset, late of the Dunn-St. Croix Conference.

=== 1977–1994 ===
Location of Final Upper St. Croix Conference Members

The Upper St. Croix Valley Conference continued on for seventeen more years before it was disbanded in 1994, and its members were dispersed to other conferences in the area. Four schools (Frederic, Grantsburg, Luck and Webster) became members of the Lakeland Conference, three members (Osceola, St. Croix Falls and Unity) joined the Middle Border Conference and Somerset returned to the Dunn-St. Croix Conference.

== Conference membership history ==
=== Final members ===
School	Location	Affiliation	Mascot	Colors	Joined	Left	Conference Joined	Current Conference
Frederic	Frederic, WI	Public	Vikings		1934	1994	Lakeland	
Grantsburg	Grantsburg, WI	Public	Pirates		1934	1994	Lakeland	
Luck	Luck, WI	Public	Cardinals		1934, 1946	1940, 1994	Northwest Border, Lakeland	Lakeland
Osceola	Osceola, WI	Public	Chieftains		1934	1994	Middle Border	
Somerset	Somerset, WI	Public	Spartans		1977	1994	Dunn-St. Croix	Middle Border
St. Croix Falls	St. Croix Falls, WI	Public	Saints		1934	1994	Middle Border	Heart O'North
Unity	Balsam Lake, WI	Public	Eagles		1957	1994	Middle Border	Heart O'North
Webster	Webster, WI	Public	Tigers		1934, 1953	1940, 1994	Northwest Border, Lakeland	Lakeland

=== Previous full members ===
School	Location	Affiliation	Mascot	Colors	Joined	Left	Conference Joined	Current Conference
Amery	Amery, WI	Public	Warriors		1934	1977	Middle Border	
Balsam Lake	Balsam Lake, WI	Public	Warriors		1934	1940	Northwest Border	Closed in 1957 (merged into Unity)
Centuria	Centuria, WI	Public	Raiders		1934	1940	Northwest Border	Closed in 1957 (merged into Unity)
Clayton	Clayton, WI	Public	Bears		1934	1936	Lakeland	
Milltown	Milltown, WI	Public	Wildcats		1934, 1942	1940, 1957	Northwest Border	Closed (merged into Unity)

=== Previous football-only members ===
School	Location	Affiliation	Mascot	Colors	Seasons	Primary Conference
Chetek	Chetek, WI	Public	Bulldogs		1983-1985	Heart O'North

== Membership timeline ==
=== Full members ===
Eastern Section Western Section

== List of state champions ==
=== Fall sports ===
Football
School	Year	Division
Osceola	1984	Division 5
Webster	1987	Division 6

Girls Volleyball
School	Year	Division
Webster	1985	Class C
Webster	1986	Class C
Somerset	1993	Division 3

=== Winter sports ===
Boys Basketball
School	Year	Division
St. Croix Falls	1950	Single Division
St. Croix Falls	1992	Division 3

Girls Gymnastics
School	Year	Division
Frederic	1992	Division 2

Boys Wrestling
School	Year	Division
St. Croix Falls	1991	Division 2

=== Spring sports ===
Boys Track & Field
School	Year	Division
Unity	1967	Class C
Unity	1969	Class C

=== Summer sports ===
Baseball
School	Year	Division
Unity	1992	Single Division

== List of conference champions ==
=== Boys Basketball ===
School	Quantity	Years
Osceola	20	1940, 1942, 1945, 1946, 1954, 1957, 1961, 1965, 1969, 1974, 1976, 1978, 1979, 1980, 1981, 1982, 1984, 1985, 1991, 1994
St. Croix Falls	16	1935, 1941, 1943, 1944, 1947, 1948, 1949, 1950, 1955, 1958, 1959, 1986, 1988, 1990, 1992, 1993
Amery	10	1951, 1952, 1953, 1960, 1961, 1962, 1970, 1971, 1975, 1977
Unity	8	1966, 1968, 1971, 1972, 1987, 1988, 1989, 1991
Frederic	5	1956, 1963, 1964, 1969, 1983
Luck	3	1966, 1967, 1973
Milltown	3	1935, 1936, 1937
Grantsburg	2	1938, 1958
Balsam Lake	0	
Centuria	0	
Clayton	0	
Somerset	0	
Webster	0	
Champions from 1939 unknown

=== Football ===
School	Quantity	Years
Grantsburg	12	1937, 1941, 1942, 1956, 1958, 1972, 1973, 1974, 1977, 1978, 1979, 1980
St. Croix Falls	12	1935, 1936, 1938, 1939, 1944, 1948, 1953, 1969, 1979, 1988, 1989, 1990
Osceola	11	1939, 1944, 1945, 1956, 1979, 1981, 1982, 1983, 1984, 1985, 1992
Amery	10	1934, 1943, 1950, 1951, 1960, 1961, 1962, 1966, 1970, 1976
Frederic	6	1939, 1946, 1947, 1955, 1961, 1968
Unity	5	1963, 1967, 1978, 1986, 1987
Luck	3	1964, 1965, 1971
Somerset	2	1991, 1993
Webster	2	1956, 1972
Chetek	0	
Milltown	0	
Champions from 1940, 1949, 1952, 1954, 1957 and 1959 unknown
