= Durand Jr./Sr. High School =

Durand-Arkansaw High School

Location
- 604 7th Ave East PO Box 190; Durand, Pepin County, Wisconsin, 54736; United States; 44°37′46.13″N 91°57′26.84″W

Information
- Funding type: Public
- Superintendent: Gregory Doverspike
- Principal: Nick Gilles
- Grades: 6 through 12
- Enrollment: 532 (2023-2024)
- Colors: Purple & gold
- Fight song: On Durand (On Wisconsin)
- Athletics conference: Dunn-St. Croix Conference
- Mascot: Panther
- Website: School District of Durand

Durand-Arkansaw Middle/Senior High School is a public school serving grades 6 through 12 in Durand, Pepin County, Wisconsin, United States.

Durand-Arkansaw Middle/High School provides Core Academic, Fine Arts and Vocational courses including Advanced Placement courses in Science, Math, Social Science, English and Visual Arts.

Durand-Arkansaw Middle/High School also provides a wide variety of extra-curricular activities including Drama, Forensics, Academic Decathlon, and FFA. Athletic programs include Volleyball, Football, Boys/Girls Cross Country, Wrestling, Boys Basketball, Girls Basketball, Golf, Boys/Girls Track, Softball and Baseball. The Panthers switched from the Middle Border Conference to the Dunn-St Croix Conference after the 2015-16 school year.

== Athletic conference affiliation history ==
- Bi-County League (1928-1933)
- Mississippi Valley Conference (1933-1965)
- Middle Border Conference (1967-2016)
- Dunn-St. Croix Conference (2016–present)
