= Bryan Witzmann =

American football player (born 1990)

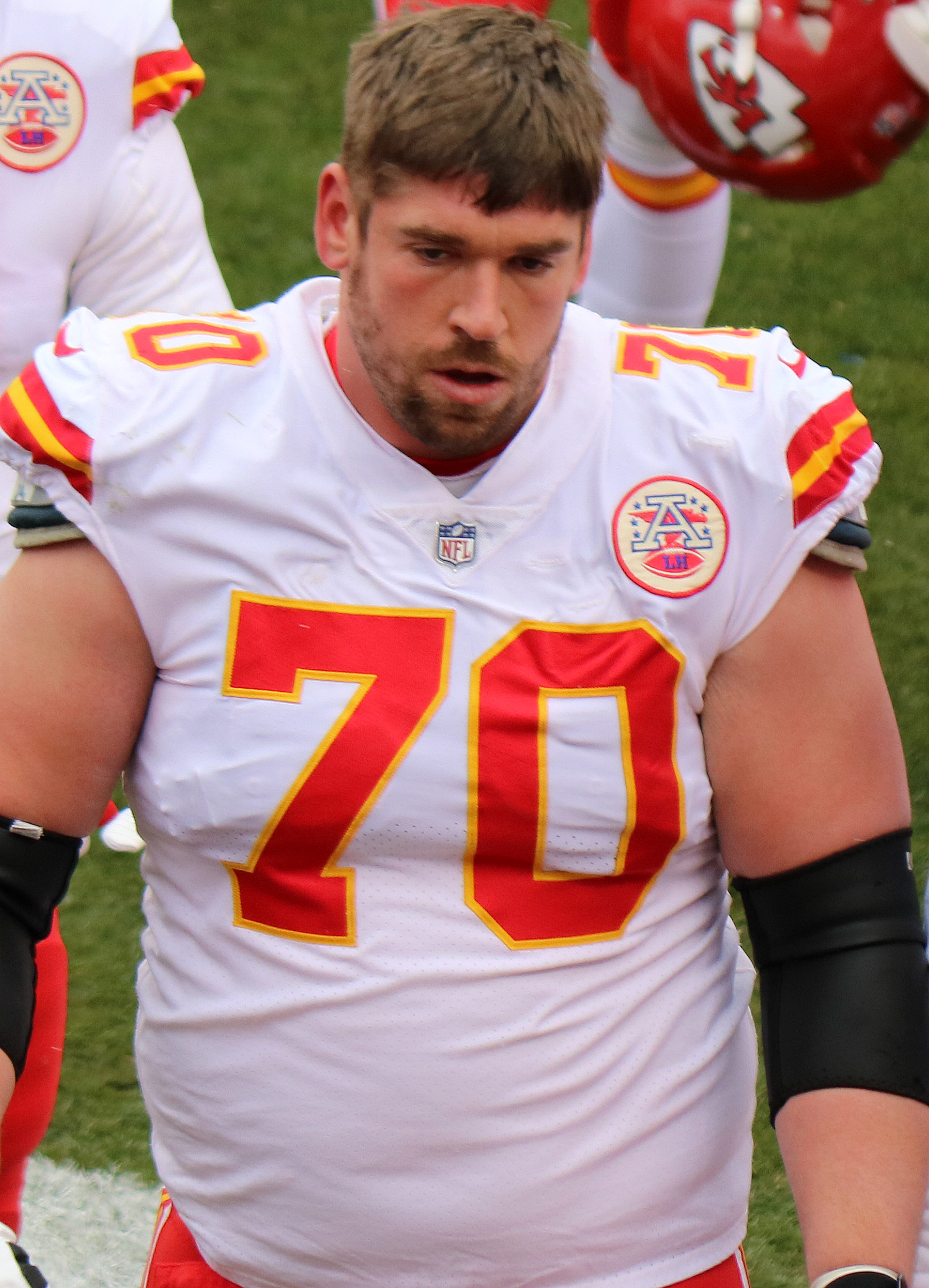
- Witzmann with the Kansas City Chiefs in 2017

No. 70, 78, 76, 68
- Position: Guard

Personal information
- Born: June 16, 1990 (age 36); Houlton, Wisconsin, U.S.
- Listed height: 6 ft 7 in (2.01 m)
- Listed weight: 320 lb (145 kg)

Career information
- High school: Somerset (Somerset, Wisconsin)
- College: South Dakota State
- NFL draft: 2014: undrafted

Career history
- Houston Texans (2014); New Orleans Saints (2015–2016)*; Dallas Cowboys (2016)*; Kansas City Chiefs (2016–2017); Minnesota Vikings (2018); Chicago Bears (2018); Cleveland Browns (2019)*; Miami Dolphins (2019); Carolina Panthers (2019); Kansas City Chiefs (2020); Atlanta Falcons (2021)*
- * Offseason or practice squad member only

Career NFL statistics
- Games played: 40
- Games started: 20
- Stats at Pro Football Reference

Bryan Witzmann (born June 16, 1990) is an American former professional football player who was an offensive guard in the National Football League (NFL). He played college football for the South Dakota State Jackrabbits. He was a contestant on The Bachelorette.

== Professional career ==
=== Houston Texans ===
Witzmann signed with the Houston Texans as an undrafted free agent on May 16, 2014. He was placed on injured reserve on August 2, 2014.

On September 1, 2015, Witzmann was waived by the Texans.

=== New Orleans Saints ===
On September 16, 2015, Witzmann was signed to the New Orleans Saints' practice squad. He was released by the Saints on November 11, 2015, but was re-signed on December 24. He signed a futures contract with the Saints on January 5, 2016. He was waived on May 17, 2016.

=== Dallas Cowboys ===
On June 8, 2016, Witzmann signed with the Dallas Cowboys. He was released by the Cowboys on September 3, 2016.

=== Kansas City Chiefs (first stint) ===
Witzmann was claimed off waivers by the Kansas City Chiefs on September 4, 2016. On July 27, 2017, he signed a one-year contract extension with the Chiefs through 2018.

In 2017, Witzmann played in all 16 games, starting 13 at left guard for the Chiefs.

On September 3, 2018, Witzmann was released by the Chiefs after losing the starting left guard job to Cameron Erving.

=== Minnesota Vikings ===
On September 10, 2018, Witzmann was signed by the Minnesota Vikings. He was released on October 5, 2018.

=== Chicago Bears ===
On October 8, 2018, Witzmann was signed by the Chicago Bears. In November, with right guard Kyle Long on injured reserve, Witzmann began splitting time at the spot with Eric Kush. He was named the starting right guard in Week 10, and started 7 games there until Long returned from injury in Week 17.

=== Cleveland Browns ===
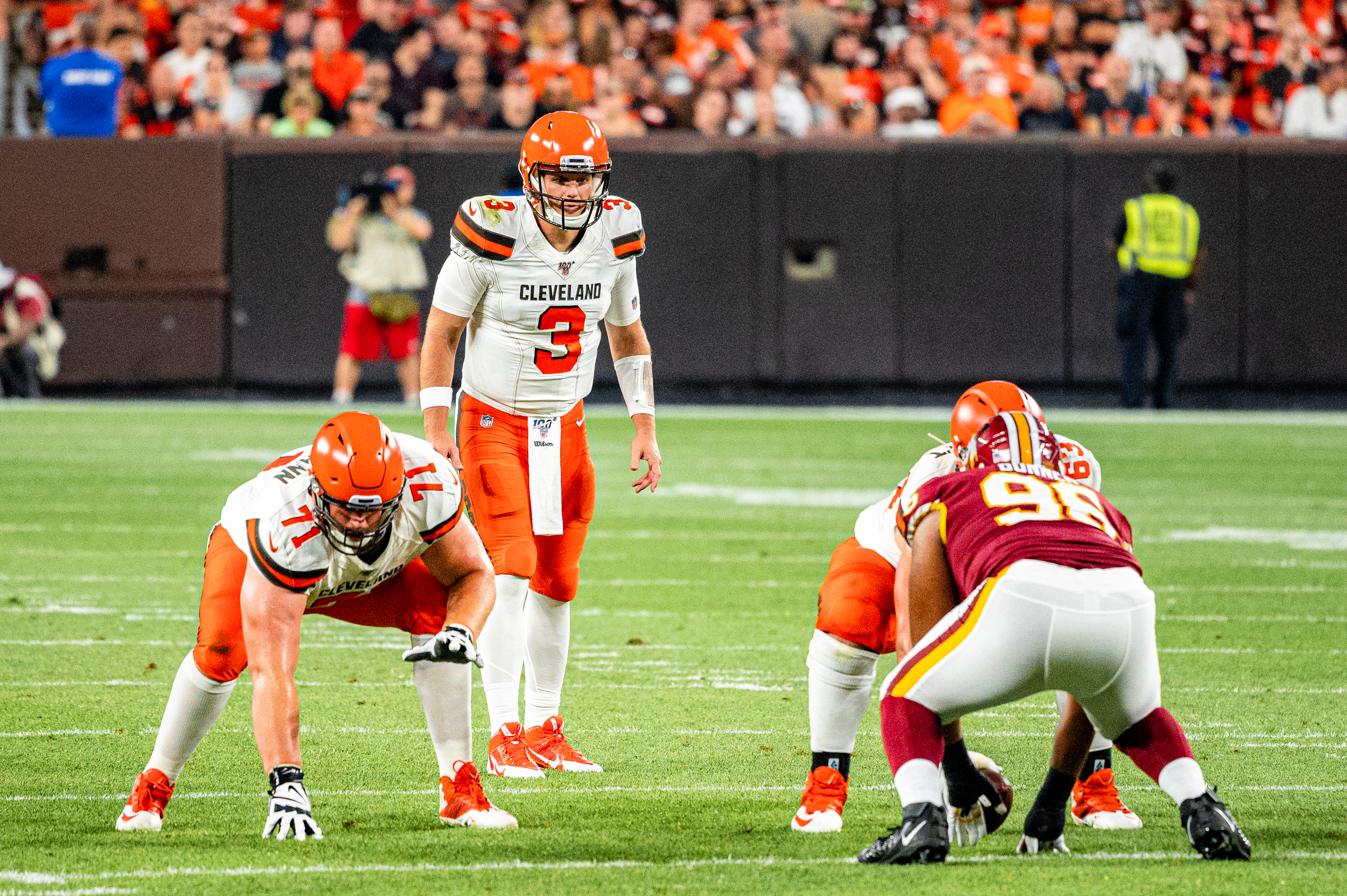
Witzmann (left) in a 2019 preseason game against the Washington Redskins.

On March 22, 2019, Witzmann signed with the Cleveland Browns. The Browns released Witzmann on August 31, 2019.

=== Miami Dolphins ===
On September 14, 2019, Witzmann was signed by the Miami Dolphins, but was released five days later.

=== Carolina Panthers ===
On September 23, 2019, Witzmann was signed by the Carolina Panthers. On November 12, 2019, Witzmann was waived by the Panthers.

=== Kansas City Chiefs (second stint) ===
On October 28, 2020, Witzmann was signed to the Chiefs' practice squad. He was elevated to the active roster on November 7 and 21 for the team's weeks 9 and 11 games against the Carolina Panthers and Las Vegas Raiders, and reverted to the practice squad after each game. On February 9, 2021, Witzmann re-signed with the Chiefs. He was released on May 10, 2021. He re-signed with the team on August 8, 2021. He was released on August 23.

=== Atlanta Falcons ===
On September 15, 2021, Witzmann was signed to the Atlanta Falcons practice squad. He was released on September 21, 2021.
