= Northwest Border Conference =

Wisconsin high school athletic conference (1940-1956)

The Northwest Border Conference is a former high school athletic conference comprising small public high schools along the St. Croix River in northwestern Wisconsin. The conference existed from 1940 to 1956, and all member schools were affiliated with the Wisconsin Interscholastic Athletic Association.

== History ==
Location of Original Northwest Border Conference Members

The Northwest Border Conference was founded in 1940 from a split of the ten-member Upper St. Croix Valley Conference. The five smallest schools in that conference (Balsam Lake, Centuria, Luck, Milltown and Webster), joined with Siren (previously an independent) to form the original six-member roster. Members were located in Burnett and Polk Counties, and all but one (Balsam Lake) were located along Wisconsin Highway 35. After only two seasons in the conference, Milltown returned to the Upper St. Croix Valley Conference in 1942, leaving the conference with five members. That same fall, the Northwest Border Conference began sponsorship of eight-player football with all members participating. Luck followed Milltown back to the Upper St. Croix Valley Conference in 1947 and were replaced by Somerset that same year, though they didn't join for football until the next year. The Northwest Border Conference competed as a five-member loop until Webster rejoined the Upper St. Croix Valley in 1953. Solon Springs, who competed as an independent for other sports, was a football-only member of the conference for the 1953 and 1954 seasons. After Somerset left for membership in the Dunn-St. Croix Conference in 1955, Solon Springs joined for the conference as full members for its final season. After the Northwest Border Conference's demise, three of its former members joined the Lakeland Conference: Balsam Lake and Centuria in 1956 and Siren in 1959. Solon Springs competed as an independent before joining the Indianhead Conference in 1968.

== Conference membership history ==
=== Final members ===
School	Location	Affiliation	Mascot	Colors	Joined	Left	Conference Joined	Current Conference
Balsam Lake	Balsam Lake, WI	Public	Warriors		1940	1956	Lakeland	Closed in 1957 (merged into Unity)
Centuria	Centuria, WI	Public	Raiders		1940	1956	Lakeland	Closed in 1957 (merged into Unity)
Siren	Siren, WI	Public	Dragons		1940	1956	Independent	Lakeland
Solon Springs	Solon Springs, WI	Public	Eagles		1955	1956	Independent	Northern Lights

=== Previous members ===
School	Location	Affiliation	Mascot	Colors	Joined	Left	Conference Joined	Current Conference
Luck	Luck, WI	Public	Cardinals		1940	1947	Upper St. Croix Valley	Lakeland
Milltown	Milltown, WI	Public	Wildcats		1940	1942	Upper St. Croix Valley	Closed in 1957 (merged into Unity)
Somerset	Somerset, WI	Public	Spartans		1947	1955	Dunn-St. Croix	Middle Border
Webster	Webster, WI	Public	Tigers		1940	1953	Upper St. Croix Valley	Lakeland

=== Football-only members ===
School	Location	Affiliation	Mascot	Colors	Seasons	Primary Conference
Solon Springs	Solon Springs, WI	Public	Eagles		1953-1954	Independent

== List of conference champions ==
=== Boys Basketball ===
School	Quantity	Years
Balsam Lake	7	1944, 1949, 1950, 1951, 1952, 1953, 1955
Luck	5	1942, 1943, 1945, 1946, 1947
Centuria	2	1950, 1954
Webster	2	1947, 1948
Milltown	1	1941
Solon Springs	1	1956
Siren	0	
Somerset	0	

=== Football ===
School	Quantity	Years
Balsam Lake	4	1944, 1948, 1949, 1953
Webster	4	1946, 1947, 1951, 1952
Luck	3	1943, 1945, 1946
Siren	2	1942, 1955
Centuria	0	
Solon Springs	0	
Somerset	0	
Champions from 1950 and 1954 unknown
