= Hilltopper =

Hilltopper or hilltoppers may refer to:

== Colleges ==
- Georgetown University, before 1928
- Ohio University – Chillicothe
- St. Edward's Hilltoppers
- West Liberty University, West Virginia
- Western Kentucky Hilltoppers
- Western Michigan Hilltoppers

== Public high schools ==
- Chardon High School, Chardon, Ohio
- B.M.C. Durfee High School, Fall River, Massachusetts
- E. C. Glass High School, Lynchburg, Virginia
- Glenbard West High School, Glen Ellyn, Illinois
- Glenwood City High School, Glenwood City, Wisconsin
- Hillsboro High School (Illinois), Hillsboro, Illinois
- Hillwood High School, Nashville, Tennessee
- Houston High School (Mississippi), Houston, Mississippi
- Los Alamos High School, Los Alamos, New Mexico
- Onalaska High School (Wisconsin), Onalaska, Wisconsin
- Science Hill High School, Johnson City, Tennessee
- Somersworth High School, Somersworth, New Hampshire
- Summit High School (New Jersey), Summit, New Jersey
- Westmont Hilltop High School, Johnstown, Pennsylvania

== Private high schools ==
- Hopkins School, New Haven, Connecticut
- Joliet Catholic Academy, Joliet, Illinois
- Marquette University High School, Milwaukee, Wisconsin
- Marshall School, Duluth, Minnesota
- The Mary Louis Academy, Jamaica Estates, New York
- Schlarman Academy, Danville, Illinois
- St. Johnsbury Academy, Saint Johnsbury, Vermont
- Worcester Academy, Worcester, Massachusetts

== Other ==
- The Hilltoppers (band), an American popular music singing group of the 1950s
- The Hilltoppers, a 1940s big band orchestra led by Tiny Hill
- Hilltopper (train), a passenger train formerly operated by Amtrak
