= Frederic High School =

Coordinates: 45°40′15.2″N 92°27′16.1″W

Location
- 1437 Clam Falls Dr, Frederic, Wisconsin 54837; Frederic, Polk County, Wisconsin; United States

Information
- Funding type: Public
- Principal: Erin Hansford
- Teaching staff: 18.80 (FTE)
- Grades: 6 through 12
- Enrollment: 226 (2023-2024)
- Student to teacher ratio: 12.02
- Colors: Blue & gold
- Song: Minnesota Rouser
- Mascot: Viking
- Website: School District of Frederic

Frederic High School is a public school for grades 9 through 12 and is located in Frederic, Wisconsin. Frederic High School is within the Frederic 6-12 School.

Frederic High School's athletic teams are a part of the WIAA Lakeland Conference. The athletic teams include baseball, basketball, volleyball, track and field, cross country, wrestling, golf, and softball. In 2012, Frederic and the neighboring village of Luck, Wisconsin joined forces to form an athletic co-op forming the Frederic-Luck track and field, softball, and baseball teams.

== Athletic conference affiliation history ==
- Upper St. Croix Valley Conference (1934-1994)
- Lakeland Conference (1994-present)
