= Michael Schachtner =

American basketball player

Personal information
- Born: November 19, 1986 (age 39) Somerset, Wisconsin, U.S.
- Listed height: 6 ft 9 in (2.06 m)
- Listed weight: 215 lb (98 kg)

Career information
- High school: Somerset (Somerset, Wisconsin)
- College: Green Bay (2005–2009)
- NBA draft: 2009: undrafted
- Playing career: 2009–2015
- Position: Forward

Career history
- 2009–2010: Kapfenberg Bulls
- 2010–2011: CSM Oradea
- 2012: Factum Sport Debrecen
- 2012–2014: Zorg en Zekerheid Leiden
- 2014–2015: Erie BayHawks
- 2015: Maine Red Claws

Career highlights
- DBL champion (2013); OBL All-Star (2010); 2x Second-team All-Horizon League (2007, 2008); Horizon League All-Newcomer Team (2006)

Michael Anthony "Mike" Schachtner (born November 19, 1986) is an American professional basketball player who last played for the Maine Red Claws of the NBA Development League. The 6'9" forward played college basketball for the University of Wisconsin–Green Bay before going undrafted in the 2009 NBA draft.

== High school career ==
Schachtner attended Somerset High School in Somerset, Wisconsin where he played for coach Eric Olson and was a two-time Middle Border Conference Player of the Year. As a senior in 2004–05, he averaged 21.4 points and 10.0 rebounds per game as he earned Milwaukee Journal Sentinel/WBCA second-team all-state honors and garnered All-Northwest Wisconsin first-team accolades.

== College career ==
In his freshman season at Green Bay, Schachtner earned Horizon League All-Newcomer team honors after he led the league with an .868 free throw percentage in conference play. He also ranked 13th in the Horizon League, and second among freshmen, with a .461 field goal percentage. In 31 games (30 starts), he averaged 10.3 points and 4.4 rebounds in 27.7 minutes per game.

In his sophomore season, Schachtner was the only sophomore to earn second-team All-Horizon League honors. He also earned Academic All-Horizon League honors and was named third-team Academic All-America by ESPN the Magazine/CoSIDA. In 33 games (all starts), he averaged 14.9 points and 4.0 rebounds in 31.6 minutes per game.

In his junior season, Schachtner earned second-team Academic All-America honors, joining Tony Bennett as the only players in school history to be awarded the honor twice. He also earned second-team All-Horizon League honors for the second straight year, and named to the 10-man Division I-AAA All-Scholar Team for the second straight year, and was academic all-league. In 30 games (28 starts), he averaged 15.8 points and 4.2 rebounds in 29.4 minutes per game.

In his senior season, he was named an Academic All-America for the third straight year, becoming the first student-athlete in school history to do so. He became Green Bay's career leader in free throw accuracy (88.3 percent) and games started (119) finished his career with 1,667 points to rank fifth in team history. During the 2008–09 season, he helped Green Bay to a 22–11 overall record and a runner-up finish in the Horizon League. He also helped the team make its first postseason appearance since 1996 and picked up a victory over 11th-rated Butler. As a senior, he averaged 11.6 points and 4.5 rebounds in 33 games (28 starts).

== Professional career ==
Schachtner went undrafted in the 2009 NBA draft. On August 25, 2009, he signed with Kapfenberg Bulls of Austria for the 2009–10 season. He went on earn OBL All-Star honors and competed in the league's three-point shootout. In 40 games, he averaged 13.2 points and 4.3 rebounds per game.

In August 2010, Schachtner signed with CSM Oradea of Romania for the 2010–11 season.

On January 4, 2012, Schachtner signed with Factum Sport Debrecen of Hungary for the rest of the 2011–12 season.

In September 2012, Schachtner signed with Zorg en Zekerheid Leiden of the Dutch Basketball League. He went on to help Leiden win the 2013 championship and returned to the team for the 2013–14 season.

In November 2014, Schachtner was acquired by the Erie BayHawks. On January 9, 2015, he was waived by the BayHawks after appearing in 14 games. On January 28, 2015, he was acquired by the Maine Red Claws.

== Personal ==
Schachtner is the son of Ed and Therese Schachtner, and has an older brother, Don, and four older sisters, Laura, Sara, Kristin and Ann.
