= Bi-County League =

Wisconsin high school athletic conference (1928-1959)

The Bi-County League is a former high school athletic conference with its membership base in west central Wisconsin. The conference was active from 1928 to 1959, and all of its member schools belonged to the Wisconsin Interscholastic Athletic Association.

== History ==
=== 1928–1955 ===
Location of Original Bi-County League Members

The Bi-County League was formed in 1928 by eight small high schools near the Mississippi River in west central Wisconsin: Alma, Arkansaw, Cochrane, Durand, Fountain City, Gilmanton, Mondovi and Nelson. All original members were located in two counties (Buffalo and Pepin), which is where the name originated from. Five years after it was founded, the conference lost three members to the new Mississippi Valley Conference (Alma, Durand and Mondovi), along with a fourth becoming an independent in Fountain City. Pepin replaced the four departing schools, bringing the membership tally to five. Alma and Fountain City rejoined the Bi-County League in 1934 to bring membership back up to seven schools. Plum City joined the Bi-County League in 1935, replacing Cochrane after their exit. They would rejoin the next year, bringing the conference back up to eight members. It would stay at this number for most of the next two decades, save for a season when Maiden Rock was the Bi-County League's ninth school.

=== 1955–1959 ===
The Bi-County League’s membership was whittled away by rural school district consolidation in the 1950s, starting with Nelson’s closing and redistricting to Durand in 1955. Two years later, Plum City left for membership in the Dunn-St. Croix Conference, and after the merger of Cochrane and Fountain City in 1958, the conference was left with only five members. The Bi-County League was dissolved in 1959, with four schools (Alma, Arkansaw, Gilmanton and Pepin) forming half of the new West Central Conference and Cochrane-Fountain City becoming members of the Mississippi Valley Conference.

== Conference membership history ==
=== Final members ===
School	Location	Affiliation	Mascot	Colors	Joined	Left	Conference Joined	Current Conference
Alma	Alma, WI	Public	Rivermen		1928, 1934	1933, 1959	Mississippi Valley, West Central	Dairyland (coop with Pepin)
Arkansaw	Arkansaw, WI	Public	Travelers		1928	1959	West Central	Closed in 1992 (consolidated into Durand)
Cochrane-Fountain City	Fountain City, WI	Public	Pirates		1958	1959	Mississippi Valley	Dairyland
Gilmanton	Gilmanton, WI	Public	Panthers		1928	1959	West Central	Dairyland (coop with Independence)
Pepin	Pepin, WI	Public	Lakers		1933	1959	West Central	Dairyland (coop with Alma)

=== Previous members ===
School	Location	Affiliation	Mascot	Colors	Joined	Left	Conference Joined	Current Conference
Cochrane	Cochrane, WI	Public	Indians		1928, 1936	1935, 1958	Closed (merged into Cochrane-Fountain City)	
Durand	Durand, WI	Public	Panthers		1928	1933	Mississippi Valley	Dunn-St. Croix
Fountain City	Fountain City, WI	Public	Eagles		1928, 1934	1933, 1958	Closed (merged into Cochrane-Fountain City)	
Maiden Rock	Maiden Rock, WI	Public	Rockets		1950	1951	Independent	Closed in 1956 (consolidated into Ellsworth)
Mondovi	Mondovi, WI	Public	Buffaloes		1928	1933	Mississippi Valley	Dunn-St. Croix
Nelson	Nelson, WI	Public	Vikings		1928	1955	Closed (consolidated into Durand)	
Plum City	Plum City, WI	Public	Blue Devils		1935	1957	Dunn-St. Croix	Dunn-St. Croix (coop with Elmwood)

== List of conference champions ==
=== Boys Basketball ===
School	Quantity	Years
Alma	8	1936, 1937, 1938, 1944, 1948, 1949, 1950, 1959
Cochrane	7	1935, 1953, 1954, 1955, 1956, 1957, 1958
Fountain City	3	1939, 1951, 1952
Mondovi	3	1931, 1932, 1933
Durand	2	1929, 1930
Gilmanton	2	1934, 1945
Nelson	1	1947
Pepin	1	1946
Plum City	1	1941
Arkansaw	0	
Cochrane-Fountain City	0	
Maiden Rock	0	
Champions from 1940, 1942-1943 unknown
