= Selmer W. Gunderson =

American politician

Selmer W. Gunderson (February 25, 1890 – 1972) was a member of the Wisconsin State Assembly.

== Biography ==
Gunderson was born on February 25, 1890, in Colfax, Wisconsin. He attended Colfax High School. From 1910 to 1918, he worked for the Soo Line Railroad.

== Political career ==
Gunderson was first elected to the Assembly in 1940. Previously, he served as a messenger in the Assembly. He was a Republican.
