= Osceola High School (Wisconsin) =

Coordinates: 45°19′56.5″N 92°41′11.9″W

Location
- 1111 Oak Ridge Dr PO BOX 128; Osceola, Polk County, Wisconsin 54020; United States

Information
- Funding type: Public
- NCES School ID: 551116001480
- Principal: Scott Newton
- Staff: 32.50 (FTE)
- Grades: 9 through 12
- Enrollment: 463 (2023-2024)
- Student to teacher ratio: 14.25
- Colors: Green & white
- Song: Osceola Rouser
- Mascot: Chieftain
- Website: School District of Osceola

Osceola High School is a public school serving grades 9 through 12 in Osceola, Polk County, Wisconsin, United States. The motto of Osceola High School is "World class education with a small town feel." The small town of Osceola is located on the St. Croix River.

== Athletics ==
Osceola High School offers tennis, volleyball, football, dance line, cross country running, golf, basketball, wrestling, baseball, softball, track, and soccer under Wisconsin Interscholastic Athletic Association regulations. The school's nickname is the Chieftains.

=== Conference affiliation history ===
- Upper St. Croix Valley Conference (1934–1994)
- Middle Border Conference (1994–present)
