= Colfax High School (Wisconsin) =

Location
- 601 University Ave; Colfax, Dunn County, Wisconsin, 54730; United States; 45.0024°N 91.7232°W

Information
- Funding type: Public
- Superintendent: Eric Young
- Principal: John Dachel
- Teaching staff: 23.80 (FTE)
- Grades: 6 through 12
- Enrollment: 337 (2023-2024)
- Student to teacher ratio: 14.16
- Colors: Red and white
- Song: Go You Northwestern
- Athletics conference: Dunn-St. Croix Conference
- Mascot: Viking
- Website: School District of Colfax

Colfax High School is a public school serving grades 9 through 12 in Colfax, Dunn County, Wisconsin, United States.

== Athletics ==
Colfax's athletic teams are known as the Vikings, and they have been members of the Dunn-St. Croix Conference since 1967.

=== Athletic conference affiliation history ===
- Middle Border Conference (1931-1967)
- Dunn-St. Croix Conference (1967–present)

== Notable alumni ==
- Stuart E. Barstad, United States Air Force chaplain
- Selmer W. Gunderson, Wisconsin State Representative
