= Amery High School =

Location
- 532 Minneapolis Ave South; Amery, Polk County, WI; United States; 45.301815°N 92.351587°W

Information
- Funding type: Public
- Principal: Josh Gould
- Staff: 31.60 (FTE)
- Grades: 9 through 12
- Enrollment: 430 (2023-2024)
- Student to teacher ratio: 13.61
- Colors: Red & white
- Mascot: Warrior
- Website: Amery High School

Amery High School is a public school serving grades 9 through 12 in Amery, Polk County, Wisconsin, United States.

== Notable people ==
- Chanz Green, member of the Wisconsin State Assembly
- Annie Lobert, activist and missionary
- Gae Magnafici, member of the Wisconsin State Assembly
- Alicia Monson, Olympic long-distance runner
- Dwight York, stand-up comedian

== Athletics ==
Amery has 16 different sports for boys and girls to participate in. The sports include: Baseball, Basketball, Cross Country, Dance, Football, Golf, Hockey, Soccer, Softball, Tennis, Track and Field, Volleyball, and Wrestling.

=== Conference affiliation history ===
- Upper St. Croix Valley Conference (1934-1977)
- Middle Border Conference (1977-present)

== Clubs and student organizations ==
Amery has 22 different clubs and organizations for students to participate in. The clubs and organizations include: American (School Yearbook), Art Club, Chess Club, Colorguard, The Warrior (Student Online Newspaper), Equine Club, FCCLA, French club, FBLA, FFA, Jazz Band, Marching Band, Jazz Choir, National Honor Society, Quiz Bowl, School Store, Solo & Ensemble Competition, Spanish Club, STARS, Student Council, VAC, Skills USA.

== The Warrior ==
The Warrior is a student run newspaper for Amery High School sponsored by local businesses.
