= Eric Kush =

American football player (born 1989)

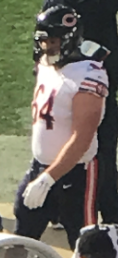
- Kush with the Chicago Bears in 2018

No. 64, 60, 72, 62
- Position: Guard

Personal information
- Born: September 9, 1989 (age 37); Bridgeville, Pennsylvania, U.S.
- Listed height: 6 ft 4 in (1.93 m)
- Listed weight: 317 lb (144 kg)

Career information
- High school: Chartiers Valley (Collier Township, Pennsylvania)
- College: California (PA)
- NFL draft: 2013: 6th round, 170th overall pick

Career history
- Kansas City Chiefs (2013−2014); Tampa Bay Buccaneers (2015); Carolina Panthers (2015)*; Houston Texans (2015); St. Louis Rams (2015); Chicago Bears (2016–2018); Cleveland Browns (2019); Las Vegas Raiders (2020)*; Chicago Bears (2020)
- * Offseason or practice squad member only

Career NFL statistics
- Games played: 50
- Games started: 19
- Stats at Pro Football Reference

Eric Kush (born September 9, 1989) is an American former professional football player who was a guard in the National Football League (NFL). He played college football for the California Vulcans. Kush was selected by the Kansas City Chiefs in the sixth round of the 2013 NFL draft.

== Professional career ==
=== Kansas City Chiefs ===
Kush was selected in the sixth round with the 170th overall pick in the 2013 NFL draft by the Kansas City Chiefs. On September 5, 2015, he was waived by the Chiefs.

=== Tampa Bay Buccaneers ===
On September 6, 2015, Kush was claimed off waivers by the Tampa Bay Buccaneers. On September 14, he was waived by the Buccaneers.

=== Carolina Panthers ===
On September 16, 2015, the Carolina Panthers signed Kush to their practice squad. He was released by the Panthers on October 27.

=== Houston Texans ===
On November 5, 2015, the Houston Texans signed Kush to a two-year contract. On November 15, Kush was released by the Texans.

=== St. Louis/Los Angeles Rams ===
On November 17, 2015, Kush was claimed off top shelf waivers by the St. Louis Rams. On September 3, 2016, Kush was waived by the Rams as part of their final roster cuts.

=== Chicago Bears ===
On September 4, 2016, Kush was claimed off waivers by the Chicago Bears. He appeared in eight games with four starts for the Bears in 2016.

On February 15, 2017, Kush signed a two-year contract extension with the Bears. Kush suffered a torn hamstring during training camp and was ruled out for the season.

Kush started the first seven weeks of the 2018 season at left guard, eventually sharing time with rookie James Daniels. Daniels took over the position when Kush suffered a neck injury. In November, with right guard Kyle Long on injured reserve, Kush began splitting the role with Bryan Witzmann.

=== Cleveland Browns ===
On March 14, 2019, Kush signed a two-year contract with the Cleveland Browns.

Kush was released by the Browns on February 17, 2020.

=== Las Vegas Raiders ===
On March 30, 2020, Kush signed a one-year contract with the Las Vegas Raiders. He was placed on injured reserve on September 5, and released with an injury settlement the next day.

=== Chicago Bears (second stint) ===
On November 10, 2020, Kush was signed to the Chicago Bears' practice squad. He was elevated to the active roster on November 16 for the team's week 10 game against the Minnesota Vikings, and reverted to the practice squad after the game. Kush practice squad contract with the team expired after the season on January 18, 2021.
