= Somerset High School (Wisconsin) =

Coordinates: 45°06′43.7″N 92°40′47.5″W

Location
- 645 Sunrise Drive; Somerset, St. Croix County, Wisconsin 54025; United States

Information
- Funding type: Public School
- Motto: Together We Engage, Educate, & Empower All Learners
- School district: School District of Somerset
- Principal: Trent Probst
- Staff: 29.34 (FTE)
- Grades: 9 through 12
- Enrollment: 464 (2023-2024)
- Student to teacher ratio: 15.81
- Colors: Red, white, and black
- Song: Across The Field
- Mascot: Spartan
- Website: https://www.somerset.k12.wi.us

Somerset High School is a public school serving grades 9 through 12 in Somerset, St. Croix County, Wisconsin, United States.

== Athletics ==
Somerset's athletic nickname is the Spartans, and they have been members of the Middle Border Conference since 2002.

=== Athletic conference affiliation history ===
- Northwest Border Conference (1947-1955)
- Dunn-St. Croix Conference (1955-1977)
- Upper St. Croix Valley Conference (1977-1994)
- Dunn-St. Croix Conference (1994-2002)
- Middle Border Conference (2002-present)

== Notable alumni ==
- Jenny Hansen - University of Kentucky gymnast (1992–1996). Hansen won three consecutive NCAA All-Around titles between 1993 and 1995. She also won a total of eight national championships over her collegiate career.
- Michael Schachtner - University of Wisconsin - Green Bay basketball player (2005–2009). Schachtner is a professional basketball player. He played the 2009–2010 season for the Kapfenberg Bulls of the Austrian Basketball League.
- Bryan Witzmann - offensive lineman for NFL's Minnesota Vikings
