= Prescott High School (Wisconsin) =

Location
- 1220 Saint Croix Street; Prescott, Wisconsin 54021; United States; 44°45′25″N 92°47′24″W

Information
- Type: Public
- School district: Prescott School District
- Superintendent: Rick Spicuzza
- Principal: Josh Fiege
- Faculty: 31.60 (on FTE basis)
- Grades: 9 to 12
- Enrollment: 430 (2022-2023)
- Student to teacher ratio: 13.61
- Colors: Cardinal and White
- Athletics conference: WIAA Middle Border Conference
- Team name: Cardinals
- Website: PHS website

Prescott High School is a public high school located in the city of Prescott, Wisconsin. The enrollment is approximately 400.

== Athletics ==
Prescott High School's athletic teams are known as the Prescott Cardinals. The Cardinals have been members of the Middle Border Conference since 2002; previously they were members of the Dunn-St. Croix Conference. They have won state titles in baseball (1994 and 2012), and in dance (2000-2013 and 2015). Prescott's main rival throughout the years has been and continues to be Ellsworth High School.

=== Athletic teams ===
- Boys' cross country
- Girls' cross country
- Girls' volleyball
- Football
- Girls' golf
- Girls' basketball
- Boys' basketball
- Wrestling
- Boys' track and field
- Girls' track and field
- Boys' golf
- Baseball
- Softball
- Dance

=== State titles ===
- Dance (Pom) 2000–2013, 2015
- Dance (Jazz) 2011, 2013–15, 2017, 2019
- Baseball 1994, 2012
- Basketball (Boys) 2018

=== Athletic conference affiliation history ===
- Dunn-St. Croix Conference (1951–1970)
- Middle Border Conference (1970–1977)
- Dunn-St. Croix Conference (1977–2002)
- Middle Border Conference (2002–present)

== Notable alumni ==
- Boyd Huppert, news reporter for KARE 11
- Nick Schommer, professional football player for the Tennessee Titans
- Heidi Swank, Nevada legislator
