= Ellsworth Community School =

Coordinates: 44°43′34.9″N 92°28′58.7″W

Ellsworth Community High School

Location
- 323 Hillcrest St; Ellsworth, Pierce County, Wisconsin 54011; United States

Information
- Funding type: Public
- Principal: Marcy Burch
- Grades: 9 through 12
- Enrollment: 527 (2023-2024)
- Colors: Purple & white
- Song: Across the Field
- Mascot: Panther
- Website: Ellsworth Community School District

Ellsworth Community High School is a public school serving grades 9 through 12 in Ellsworth, Pierce County, Wisconsin, United States.

== Academics ==
Ellsworth Community High School offers a wide range of class selections in subjects including English, Mathematics, Science, History, Social Studies, Music, Art, Physical Education, Agricultural Sciences, Technical Education, Family and Consumer Education, and Business and Marketing. Advanced Placement classes are available. They include AP Literature and Composition, AP United States History, AP Biology, and AP Calculus.

== Athletics ==
Ellsworth, Wisconsin's athletics participate in the Middle Border Conference. The Middle Border Conference consists of seven other schools in Wisconsin including Amery, Baldwin-Woodville, New Richmond, Osceola, Prescott, Somerset, and St. Croix Central. Yet their main rival has always seemingly been Prescott.

== Controversies ==
Former EHS band director Brandon Fuhrman was placed on administrative leave in February 2023 after an intimate relationship with a student was exposed. He was fired and sentenced to 2 years in prison, given a fine, and was ordered to register as a sex offender for the next 15 years.
