= Glenwood City High School =

School in Wisconsin, United States

Coordinates: 45°03′11.1″N 92°09′16.3″W

Location
- 850 Maple St. Glenwood City, (St. Croix County), WI 54013; United States

Information
- Funding type: Public
- Principal: Marcy Burch
- Staff: 15.70 (FTE)
- Grades: 9 through 12
- Enrollment: 203 (2023–2024)
- Student to teacher ratio: 12.93
- Colors: Blue & white
- Song: On Wisconsin
- Mascot: Hilltopper
- Website: School District of Glenwood City

Glenwood City High School is a public school serving grades 9 through 12 in Glenwood City, St. Croix County, Wisconsin, United States.

== Officials ==
- District Administrator: Tim Johnson
- Athletic Director: Patrick Gretzlock
- Principal: Patrick Gretzlock

== Athletics ==
Glenwood City's teams are nicknamed the Hilltoppers, and they have been members of the Dunn-St. Croix Conference since 1972.

=== Athletic conference affiliation history ===
- Dunn-St. Croix Conference (1930-1949)
- Middle Border Conference (1949-1972)
- Dunn-St. Croix Conference (1972-present)
