= Flambeauland Conference =

Wisconsin high school athletic conference (1946-1955)

The Flambeauland Conference is a former high school athletic conference with its membership base in northwestern Wisconsin. Operational from 1946 to 1955, the conference and its members were affiliated with the Wisconsin Interscholastic Athletic Association.

== History ==
Location of Original Flambeauland Conference Members

The Flambeauland Conference was formed in the aftermath of World War II by six small high schools in northwestern Wisconsin: Hannibal, Hawkins, Ingram-Glen Flora, Lake Holcombe, Tony and Weyerhaeuser. It was named for its original member schools’ proximity to the Flambeau River, and members were located in three counties (Chippewa, Rusk and Taylor). Because of the small size and remote location of its members, the Flambeauland Conference sponsored baseball as a fall sport in place of football. Membership remained stable for the first five years of competition, until Weyerhaeuser returned to the Lakeland Conference in 1951. After Hawkins’ move to the similarly named Flambeau League in 1952, the Flambeauland Conference continued with four schools until its dissolution in 1955. Ingram-Glen Flora joined the Flambeau League immediately after the Flambeauland Conference was disbanded, while the other three schools became independents before eventually joining other conferences.

== Conference membership history ==
=== Final members ===
School	Location	Affiliation	Mascot	Colors	Joined	Left	Conference Joined	Current Conference
Hannibal	Hannibal, WI	Public	Unknown		1946	1955	Independent	Closed in 1956 (consolidated into Gilman)
Ingram-Glen Flora	Glen Flora, WI	Public	Bluejays		1946	1955	Flambeau League	Closed in 1961 (merged into Flambeau High School)
Lake Holcombe	Lake Holcombe, WI	Public	Chieftains		1946	1955	Independent	Lakeland
Tony	Tony, WI	Public	Tornadoes		1946	1955	Independent	Closed in 1961 (merged into Flambeau High School)

=== Former members ===
School	Location	Affiliation	Mascot	Colors	Joined	Left	Conference Joined	Current Conference
Hawkins	Hawkins, WI	Public	Hawkeyes		1946	1952	Flambeau League	Closed in 1967 (consolidated into Ladysmith)
Weyerhaeuser	Weyerhaeuser, WI	Public	Wildcats		1946	1951	Lakeland	Closed in 2010 (merged into Chetek-Weyerhaeuser)

== List of conference champions ==
=== Boys Basketball ===
School	Quantity	Years
Ingram-Glen Flora	4	1947, 1948, 1949, 1955
Hawkins	2	1950, 1951
Tony	2	1952, 1954
Hannibal	0	
Lake Holcombe	0	
Weyerhaeuser	0	
Champions from 1953 unknown
