= Shell Lake High School =

High school in Wisconsin, United States

Shell Lake School District

Location
- 271 Highway 63; Shell Lake, (Washburn County), Wisconsin 54871; United States

Information
- Type: Public
- Principal: Tiffany Schroeder - Elementary Principal Kyle Johnson - Grades 7-12 Principal
- Staff: 21.72 (FTE)
- Enrollment: 317 (2023-2024)
- Student to teacher ratio: 14.59
- Colors: Blue and gold
- Fight song: "Stars and Stripes Forever"
- Athletics conference: Lakeland North
- Nickname: Lakers

Shell Lake High School is a high school in Shell Lake, Wisconsin, in Washburn County, Wisconsin.

The school had a separate school called the Shell Lake Primary school that educated grades K–2. In 2018, a local referendum was successfully voted on and passed in the Shell Lake community. This resulted in an expansion on the high school to build classrooms for grades K - 2 and including both a second gymnasium and an auditorium. The Shell Lake Primary School's final year was the 2019/2020 academic year. The final year was cut short in March 2020 due to the COVID-19 pandemic resulting in the remainder of the academic year to be finished through online education.

== Sports ==
Shell Lake High School is Division 3 for most sports of the Wisconsin Interscholastic Athletic Association. Their team name is the Shell Lake Lakers. Shell Lake High School is noted for its football team, which has claimed three state titles. The school has also won a state title in team wrestling and girls' track athletics. Their baseball team has gone to state and earned the runner-up title.

Sports played at Shell Lake High School include: Football, Volleyball (girls only), Basketball, Track and Field, Baseball, Softball, Cross Country, and Wrestling.
