= Glenwood City, Wisconsin =

- City
- Nickname: The City of 57 Hills
- Location of Glenwood City in St. Croix County, Wisconsin

- Location within the state of Wisconsin Location within the United States Glenwood City (North America)
- Coordinates: 45°3′26″N 92°10′12″W
- Country: United States
- State: Wisconsin
- County: St. Croix

Area
  - Total: 3.47 sq mi (9.00 km^{2})
  - Land: 3.47 sq mi (9.00 km^{2})
  - Water: 0 sq mi (0.00 km^{2})
- Elevation: 1,030 ft (314 m)

Population (2020)
  - Total: 1,306
  - Density: 376/sq mi (145/km^{2})
- Time zone: UTC-6 (Central (CST))
  - Summer (DST): UTC-5 (CDT)
- Area codes: 715 & 534
- FIPS code: 55-29625
- GNIS feature ID: 1581635
- Website: glenwoodcitywi.com

Glenwood City is a city in St. Croix County, Wisconsin, United States. The population was 1,306 at the 2020 census. It is known as the "City of 57 Hills." Glenwood City is the site of the annual St. Croix County Fair.

== History ==
The city was founded in 1885. It was once a stop on the Wisconsin Central Railway, but the line to Glenwood City is now abandoned.

== Geography ==
According to the United States Census Bureau, the city has a total area of 2.49 square miles (6.45 km^{2}), all land.

Glenwood City is situated along Tiffany Creek.

Wisconsin Highways 128 and 170 are main routes in the community. Other routes include County Roads G and X, Oak Street, and Maple Street.

Glenwood City is geographically within the town of Glenwood, but is a separate entity.

It is located at 45°3′26″N 92°10′12″W (45.057220, -92.169991).

== Demographics ==
Historical population
Census	Pop.	Note	%±
1900	1,789		—
1910	954		−46.7%
1920	779		−18.3%
1930	771		−1.0%
1940	811		5.2%
1950	778		−4.1%
1960	835		7.3%
1970	822		−1.6%
1980	950		15.6%
1990	1,026		8.0%
2000	1,183		15.3%
2010	1,242		5.0%
2020	1,306		5.2%
U.S. Decennial Census

=== 2010 census ===
As of the census of 2010, there were 1,242 people, 509 households, and 328 families living in the city. The population density was 498.8 inhabitants per square mile (192.6/km^{2}). There were 561 housing units at an average density of 225.3 per square mile (87.0/km^{2}). The racial makeup of the city was 97.7% White, 0.1% African American, 0.1% Native American, 0.5% Asian, 0.6% from other races, and 1.1% from two or more races. Hispanic or Latino of any race were 1.9% of the population.

There were 509 households, of which 33.6% had children under the age of 18 living with them, 42.2% were married couples living together, 15.7% had a female householder with no husband present, 6.5% had a male householder with no wife present, and 35.6% were non-families. 32.6% of all households were made up of individuals, and 17.3% had someone living alone who was 65 years of age or older. The average household size was 2.37 and the average family size was 2.91.

The median age in the city was 37.7 years. 26.7% of residents were under the age of 18; 7.1% were between the ages of 18 and 24; 25.2% were from 25 to 44; 23.5% were from 45 to 64; and 17.5% were 65 years of age or older. The gender makeup of the city was 48.1% male and 51.9% female.

=== 2000 census ===
As of the census of 2000, there were 1,183 people, 460 households, and 305 families living in the city. The population density was 477.2 inhabitants per square mile (184.2/km^{2}). There were 491 housing units at an average density of 198.1 per square mile (76.5/km^{2}). The racial makeup of the city was 99.07% White, 0.08% African American, 0.17% Native American, 0.34% Asian, and 0.34% from two or more races. Hispanic or Latino of any race were 0.17% of the population.

There were 460 households, out of which 36.3% had children under the age of 18 living with them, 48.9% were married couples living together, 12.0% had a female householder with no husband present, and 33.5% were non-families. 29.3% of all households were made up of individuals, and 17.6% had someone living alone who was 65 years of age or older. The average household size was 2.48 and the average family size was 3.08.

In the city, the population was spread out, with 28.6% under the age of 18, 8.5% from 18 to 24, 26.6% from 25 to 44, 17.8% from 45 to 64, and 18.5% who were 65 years of age or older. The median age was 36 years. For every 100 females, there were 89.3 males. For every 100 females age 18 and over, there were 82.9 males.

The median income for a household in the city was $36,964, and the median income for a family was $45,417. Males had a median income of $32,875 versus $25,833 for females. The per capita income for the city was $17,424. About 6.1% of families and 9.1% of the population were below the poverty line, including 11.8% of those under age 18 and 10.2% of those age 67 or over.

== Culture ==
Glenwood City is home to the St. Croix County Fair in July, and Ren in the Glen, a Renaissance Faire, on the last weekend in July. It also hosts a PRCA Rodeo in June annually.

== Education ==
The public school district of Glenwood City maintains a K–12 educational complex on the southeast corner of the city. Glenwood City High School is the local high school.

== See also ==
- List of cities in Wisconsin
