= Clayton (village), Wisconsin =

Clayton, Wisconsin
- Village
- Location of Clayton in Polk County, Wisconsin.
- Coordinates: 45°19′36″N 92°10′23″W
- Country: United States
- State: Wisconsin
- County: Polk

Area
  - Total: 3.34 sq mi (8.65 km^{2})
  - Land: 3.21 sq mi (8.32 km^{2})
  - Water: 0.13 sq mi (0.33 km^{2})
- Elevation: 1,211 ft (369 m)

Population (2020)
  - Total: 550
  - Density: 170/sq mi (66/km^{2})
- Time zone: UTC-6 (Central (CST))
  - Summer (DST): UTC-5 (CDT)
- Area codes: 715 & 534
- FIPS code: 55-15100
- GNIS feature ID: 1563136

Clayton is a village in Polk County, Wisconsin, United States. The population was 550 at the 2020 census. The village is located within the Town of Clayton.

== History ==
A post office called Clayton has been in operation since 1876. The village was named for Clayton Rodgers, foreman at a local mill.

== Geography ==
Clayton is located at 45°19′36″N 92°10′23″W (45.326659, -92.172985).

According to the United States Census Bureau, the village has a total area of 3.24 square miles (8.39 km^{2}), of which 3.11 square miles (8.05 km^{2}) is land and 0.13 square miles (0.34 km^{2}) is water.

== Demographics ==
Historical population
Census	Pop.	Note	%±
1910	220		—
1920	304		38.2%
1930	341		12.2%
1940	367		7.6%
1950	350		−4.6%
1960	324		−7.4%
1970	306		−5.6%
1980	425		38.9%
1990	450		5.9%
2000	507		12.7%
2010	571		12.6%
2020	550		−3.7%
U.S. Decennial Census

=== 2010 census ===
As of the census of 2010, there were 571 people, 208 households, and 149 families living in the village. The population density was 183.6 inhabitants per square mile (70.9/km^{2}). There were 225 housing units at an average density of 72.3 per square mile (27.9/km^{2}). The racial makeup of the village was 96.0% White, 0.7% African American, 0.2% Native American, 1.2% from other races, and 1.9% from two or more races. Hispanic or Latino of any race were 2.1% of the population.

There were 208 households, of which 48.6% had children under the age of 18 living with them, 39.9% were married couples living together, 24.0% had a female householder with no husband present, 7.7% had a male householder with no wife present, and 28.4% were non-families. 24.0% of all households were made up of individuals, and 7.2% had someone living alone who was 65 years of age or older. The average household size was 2.75 and the average family size was 3.10.

The median age in the village was 29.1 years. 33.6% of residents were under the age of 18; 11.5% were between the ages of 18 and 24; 27.5% were from 25 to 44; 19.8% were from 45 to 64; and 7.7% were 65 years of age or older. The gender makeup of the village was 49.2% male and 50.8% female.

=== 2000 census ===
As of the census of 2000, there were 507 people, 199 households, and 125 families living in the village. The population density was 162.6 people per square mile (62.7/km^{2}). There were 208 housing units at an average density of 66.7/sq mi (25.7/km^{2}). The racial makeup of the village was 97.83% White, 1.18% Black or African American, 0.20% Native American, 0.20% Asian, and 0.59% from two or more races. 0.00% of the population were Hispanic or Latino of any race.

There were 199 households, out of which 38.7% had children under the age of 18 living with them, 42.2% were married couples living together, 14.1% had a female householder with no husband present, and 36.7% were non-families. 29.1% of all households were made up of individuals, and 14.1% had someone living alone who was 65 years of age or older. The average household size was 2.55 and the average family size was 3.15.

In the village, the population was spread out, with 32.0% under the age of 18, 9.7% from 18 to 24, 32.9% from 25 to 44, 15.8% from 45 to 64, and 9.7% who were 65 years of age or older. The median age was 30 years. For every 100 females, there were 93.5 males. For every 100 females age 18 and over, there were 94.9 males.

The median income for a household in the village was $29,135, and the median income for a family was $34,375. Males had a median income of $29,583 versus $22,500 for females. The per capita income for the village was $14,988. About 10.6% of families and 18.7% of the population were below the poverty line, including 25.2% of those under age 18 and 14.5% of those age 65 or over.
