= Baldwin-Woodville Area High School =

Baldwin-Woodville High School

Location
- 1000 13th Ave., P.O. Box 240; Baldwin, St. Croix County, Wisconsin 54002; United States; 44°57′59.56″N 92°22′45.65″W

Information
- Funding type: Public
- Principal: J.R. Dachel
- Staff: 32.20 (FTE)
- Grades: 9 through 12
- Enrollment: 508 (2023-2024)
- Student to teacher ratio: 15.78
- Colors: Scarlet & silver
- Song: Notre Dame Victory March
- Mascot: Blackhawk
- Website: Baldwin-Woodville Area School District

Baldwin-Woodville Area High School is a public school serving grades 9 through 12 in Baldwin, St. Croix County, Wisconsin, United States. The principal of Baldwin-Woodville for the 2013–2014 school year is Dave Branvold. Eric Russell, previous principal, is now the superintendent of the school district.

== Extracurricular activities ==
Baldwin-Woodville is a member of WIAA (Wisconsin Interscholastic Athletic Association). State championships include: Football Div. 4 (1987, 1992, 2024), Girls’ Hockey (2009, 2010, 2011), Softball Div. 2 (2012), Boys’ Track and Field (1983), and Wrestling Div. 2 (1993).
