= Elmwood, Wisconsin =

- Village
- Location of Elmwood in Pierce County, Wisconsin.
- Coordinates: 44°46′44″N 92°8′57″W
- Country: United States
- State: Wisconsin
- County: Pierce

Area
  - Total: 1.54 sq mi (3.98 km^{2})
  - Land: 1.51 sq mi (3.92 km^{2})
  - Water: 0.019 sq mi (0.05 km^{2})
- Elevation: 860 ft (262 m)

Population (2020)
  - Total: 820
  - Density: 540/sq mi (210/km^{2})
- Time zone: UTC-6 (Central (CST))
  - Summer (DST): UTC-5 (CDT)
- Zip: 54012
- Area codes: 715 & 534
- FIPS code: 55-23700
- GNIS feature ID: 1564582
- Website: https://www.elmwoodwi.org/

Elmwood is a village in Pierce County, Wisconsin, United States, situated along the Eau Galle River. The population was 820 at the 2020 census, up from 817 at the 2010 census.

== History ==
A post office called Elmwood has been in operation since 1885. The village was named for a grove of elm trees near the town site.

== Geography ==
Elmwood is located at 44°46′44″N 92°8′57″W (44.778996, -92.149090).

According to the United States Census Bureau, the village has a total area of 1.53 square miles (3.96 km^{2}), of which 1.51 square miles (3.91 km^{2}) is land and 0.02 square miles (0.05 km^{2}) is water.

== Demographics ==
Historical population
Census	Pop.	Note	%±
1910	585		—
1920	632		8.0%
1930	737		16.6%
1940	828		12.3%
1950	772		−6.8%
1960	776		0.5%
1970	737		−5.0%
1980	885		20.1%
1990	775		−12.4%
2000	841		8.5%
2010	817		−2.9%
2020	820		0.4%
U.S. Decennial Census

=== 2010 census ===
As of the census of 2010, there were 817 people, 343 households, and 222 families living in the village. The population density was 541.1 inhabitants per square mile (208.9/km^{2}). There were 379 housing units at an average density of 251.0 per square mile (96.9/km^{2}). The racial makeup of the village was 98.0% White, 0.1% African American, 0.5% Native American, 0.1% Asian, 0.7% from other races, and 0.5% from two or more races. Hispanic or Latino of any race were 3.1% of the population.

There were 343 households, of which 28.6% had children under the age of 18 living with them, 49.9% were married couples living together, 9.3% had a female householder with no husband present, 5.5% had a male householder with no wife present, and 35.3% were non-families. 30.6% of all households were made up of individuals, and 14% had someone living alone who was 65 years of age or older. The average household size was 2.28 and the average family size was 2.82.

The median age in the village was 43.2 years. 22.2% of residents were under the age of 18; 5.5% were between the ages of 18 and 24; 24.8% were from 25 to 44; 26% were from 45 to 64; and 21.7% were 65 years of age or older. The gender makeup of the village was 49.4% male and 50.6% female.

=== 2000 census ===
As of the census of 2000, there were 841 people, 343 households, and 218 families living in the village. The population density was 568.2 inhabitants per square mile (219.4/km^{2}). There were 366 housing units at an average density of 247.3 per square mile (95.5/km^{2}). The racial makeup of the village was 97.98% White, 0.12% African American, 0.24% Native American, 0.12% Asian, 0.83% from other races, and 0.71% from two or more races. Hispanic or Latino of any race were 1.43% of the population.

There were 343 households, out of which 27.7% had children under the age of 18 living with them, 51.9% were married couples living together, 9.0% had a female householder with no husband present, and 36.4% were non-families. 32.1% of all households were made up of individuals, and 17.8% had someone living alone who was 65 years of age or older. The average household size was 2.29 and the average family size was 2.90.

In the village, the population was spread out, with 22.4% under the age of 18, 6.8% from 18 to 24, 25.4% from 25 to 44, 21.5% from 45 to 64, and 23.9% who were 65 years of age or older. The median age was 41 years. For every 100 females, there were 85.7 males. For every 100 females age 18 and over, there were 80.9 males.

The median income for a household in the village was $33,558, and the median income for a family was $41,250. Males had a median income of $32,375 versus $22,250 for females. The per capita income for the village was $16,369. About 2.3% of families and 4.4% of the population were below the poverty line, including 2.6% of those under age 18 and 8.3% of those age 65 or over.

== Education ==
Elmwood is served by the Elmwood School District. The District maintains one school for students in grades K-12, which includes Elmwood High School. Student organizations include band, choir, student council, Spanish club, forensics, FCCLA, FFA and NHS. Football, volleyball, cross country, dance, boys' basketball, girls' basketball, wrestling, baseball, softball, and track and field are offered at the high school level. The EPC Wolves is the newest addition to the Elmwood Athletics Department. The sports included in this co-op are football, cross country, cheerleading, boys' and girls' basketball, and track and field.

== Events ==
Elmwood hosts an annual "UFO Days" festival on the final weekend of July. Events are held downtown, at the Elmwood Area School athletic fields, and at the Elmwood Rod and Gun Club. Typical events include a parade, a softball tournament, a fun run, a medallion hunt, and live music.

The local interest in UFOs is a result of unexplainable things that have happened around Elmwood. A federal government UFO Working Group investigated Elmwood sightings of unexplained phenomena.

== Notable people ==
- Tom Tiffany, Wisconsin politician
