= Elmwood High School (Elmwood, Wisconsin) =

Coordinates: 44°46′40″N 92°09′12″W

Location
- 213 South Scott Street Elmwood, Wisconsin 54740; Elmwood, Pierce County, Wisconsin; United States

Information
- Funding type: Public
- Principal: Tom Sauve
- Teaching staff: 10.62 (FTE)
- Grades: 9-12
- Enrollment: 90 (2023-2024)
- Student to teacher ratio: 8.47
- Color
- Song: Notre Dame Victory March
- Mascot: Wolves
- Website: Elmwood High School

Elmwood High School is a public school district in Elmwood, Wisconsin, located in downtown Elmwood. The Elmwood School District offers classes for students from Pre-Kindergarten to Grade 12, which are all located in the same building. As of 2022 the principal is Tom Sauve and the superintendent is Dr. Glenn Webb. There are 69 staff members in the Elmwood School District.

== Academics ==
- Agriscience
- Art
- Business Education
- English
- Family and Consumer Education
- Foreign Language
- Instrumental Music
- Mathematics & Physics
- Physical Education & Health
- Science
- Social Studies
- Special Education
- Technical Education
- Vocal Music

== Athletics ==
- Football
- Volleyball
- Cross Country
- Dance
- Boys Basketball
- Girls Basketball
- Wrestling (Co-op with Spring Valley)
- Baseball
- Softball
- Track & Field
- Equestrian Team
- Hockey

=== Athletic conference affiliation history ===
- Dunn-St. Croix Conference (1932-present)

== Student organizations ==
- Band
- Choir
- Student Council
- Spanish Club
- Forensics
- FCCLA
- FFA
- NHS

== Community ==
- Alumni
- PTO
- Community Club
- City Council
- Public Library
- Day Care Providers
- Youth Activities
- Food Shelf
- Elmwood Expos
- Pierce County
- Dunn County
