= St. Croix Falls High School =

Coordinates: 45°24′27.2″N 92°38′02.0″W

Location
- 740 Maple; St. Croix Falls, Polk County, Wisconsin 54024; United States

Information
- Funding type: Public
- Superintendent: Craig Broeren
- Principal: Michael Wilson
- Staff: 24.19 (FTE)
- Grades: 9 through 12
- Enrollment: 356 (2023-2024)
- Student to teacher ratio: 14.72
- Colors: Royal blue & white
- Mascot: Saint
- Website: St. Croix Falls High School

St. Croix Falls High School is a public school serving grades 9 through 12 in St. Croix Falls, Polk County, Wisconsin, United States.

In 2012, U.S. News ranked St. Croix Falls High School as the ninth best high school in Wisconsin.

== Notable alumni ==
- Megan Kalmoe, U.S. Olympian Rower
- Isla Hinck, co-founder of Easy Allies
- Anders Nelson, Vanderbilt volleyball head coach
