= Somerset, Wisconsin =

- Village
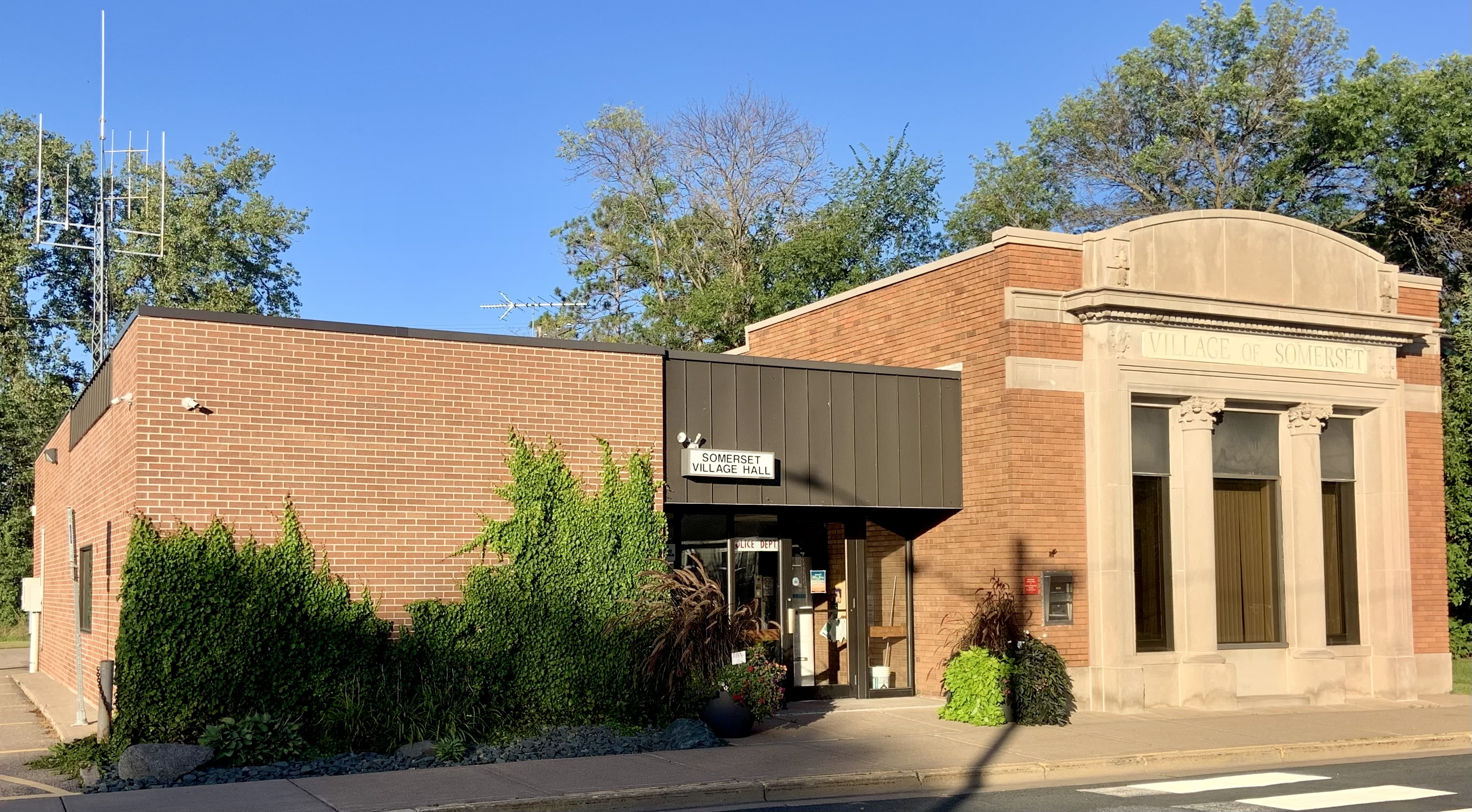
- Village hall

- Location of Somerset in St. Croix County, Wisconsin

- Location within the state of Wisconsin Somerset, Wisconsin (the United States)
- Coordinates: 45°8′30″N 92°42′9″W
- Country: United States
- State: Wisconsin
- County: St. Croix

Area
  - Total: 3.33 sq mi (8.62 km^{2})
  - Land: 3.33 sq mi (8.62 km^{2})
  - Water: 0 sq mi (0.00 km^{2})
- Elevation: 961 ft (293 m)

Population (2020)
  - Total: 3,019
  - Density: 907/sq mi (350/km^{2})
- Time zone: UTC-6 (Central (CST))
  - Summer (DST): UTC-5 (CDT)
- Area codes: 715 & 534
- FIPS code: 55-74700
- GNIS feature ID: 1581724
- Website: villageofsomerset.us

Somerset is a village in St. Croix County, Wisconsin, United States, along the Apple River. The population was 3,019 at the 2020 census. The village is located within the Town of Somerset.

== History ==
Somerset was named by General Samuel Harriman after his father's home of Somerset, England. Somerset has a lengthy and colorful history. Before the turn of the century Somerset was bordered on the south by cranberry bogs. The terrain naturally lent itself to the production of cranberries as a result of the hilliness of the area, which is dotted with ponds, sloughs, swamps and bogs. These wet areas became of greater interest to the local population during Prohibition. These same low spots where water collected became ideal for collecting water for the production of moonshine (homemade alcoholic beverages). Indeed, Somerset already had a history of being a rough logging town, and it was only a natural progression to become the supplier of bootlegged alcohol to the twin cities of Saint Paul and Minneapolis. After Prohibition ended, the citizens of Somerset returned to the more humble activities of logging and farming.

== Geography ==
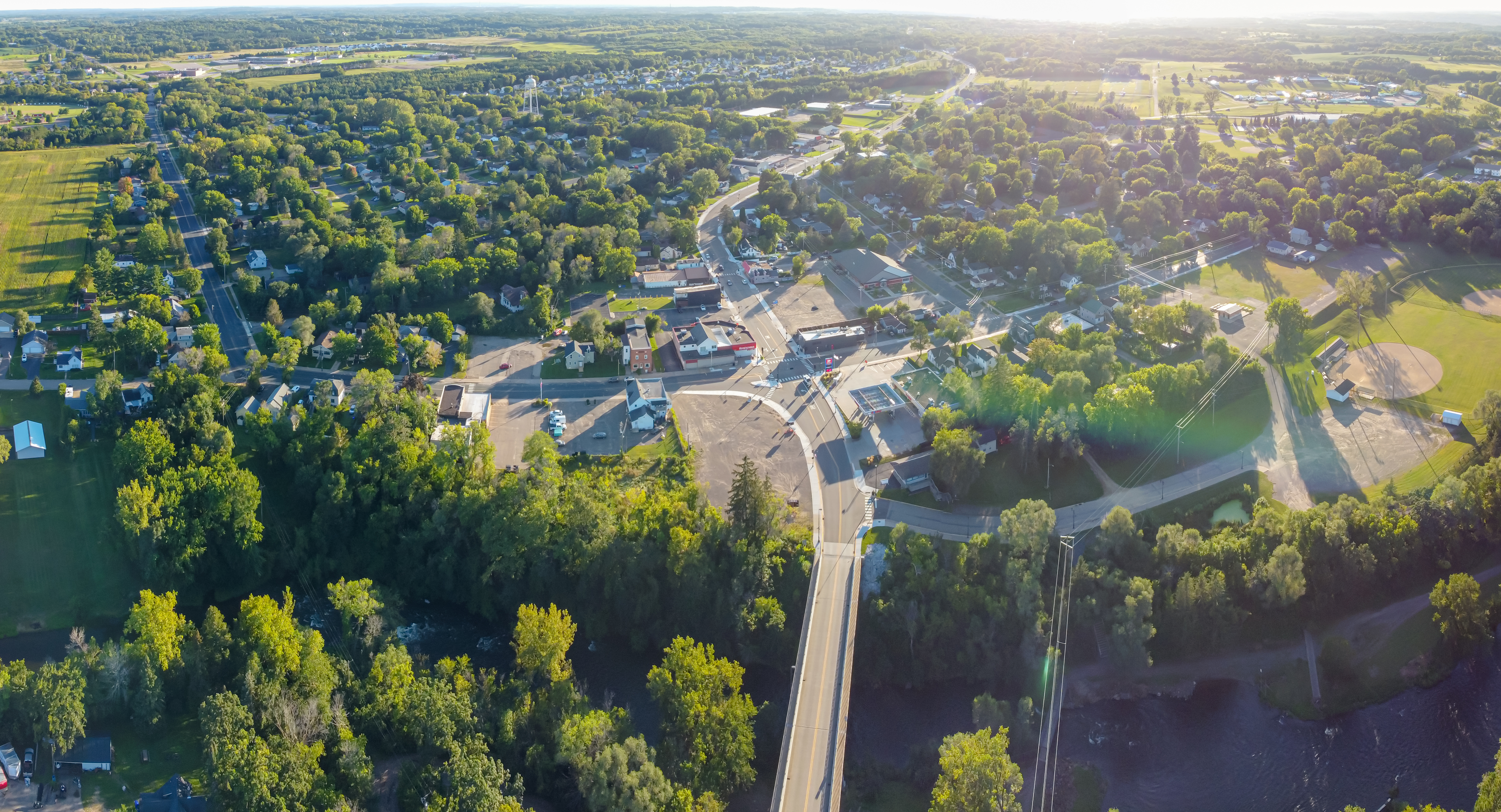

Somerset is located at 45°7′30″N 92°40′30″W (45.125189, -92.6752).

According to the United States Census Bureau, the village has a total area of 2.75 square miles (7.12 km^{2}), all land. The Apple River flows through Somerset.

Wisconsin Highways 35 and 64, and County Roads C, I, and VV are main routes in the community.

== Demographics ==
Historical population
Census	Pop.	Note	%±
1880	77		—
1920	406		—
1930	480		18.2%
1940	476		−0.8%
1950	531		11.6%
1960	729		37.3%
1970	778		6.7%
1980	860		10.5%
1990	1,072		24.7%
2000	1,556		45.1%
2010	2,635		69.3%
2020	3,019		14.6%
U.S. Decennial Census

=== 2010 census ===
As of the census of 2010, there were 2,635 people, 990 households, and 654 families living in the village. The population density was 958.2 inhabitants per square mile (370.0/km^{2}). There were 1,102 housing units at an average density of 400.7 per square mile (154.7/km^{2}). The racial makeup of the village was 93.1% White, 1.0% African American, 0.6% Native American, 0.8% Asian, 2.0% from other races, and 2.5% from two or more races. Hispanic or Latino of any race were 5.1% of the population.

There were 990 households, of which 44.6% had children under the age of 18 living with them, 43.8% were married couples living together, 14.8% had a female householder with no husband present, 7.4% had a male householder with no wife present, and 33.9% were non-families. 23.8% of all households were made up of individuals, and 6% had someone living alone who was 65 years of age or older. The average household size was 2.64 and the average family size was 3.15.

The median age in the village was 29.6 years. 32.1% of residents were under the age of 18; 8.7% were between the ages of 18 and 24; 36.3% were from 25 to 44; 17.4% were from 45 to 64; and 5.5% were 65 years of age or older. The gender makeup of the village was 48.9% male and 51.1% female.

=== 2000 census ===
As of the census of 2000, there were 1,556 people, 635 households, and 391 families living in the village. The population density was 844.1 inhabitants per square mile (325.9/km^{2}). There were 659 housing units at an average density of 357.5 per square mile (138.0/km^{2}). The racial makeup of the village was 96.85% White, 0.77% Black or African American, 0.45% Native American, 0.06% Asian, 0.45% from other races, and 1.41% from two or more races. 1.16% of the population were Hispanic or Latino of any race.

There were 635 households, out of which 39.4% had children under the age of 18 living with them, 40.8% were married couples living together, 14.3% had a female householder with no husband present, and 38.4% were non-families. 26.8% of all households were made up of individuals, and 8.2% had someone living alone who was 65 years of age or older. The average household size was 2.45 and the average family size was 2.99.

In the village, the population was spread out, with 30.1% under the age of 18, 13.4% from 18 to 24, 36.8% from 25 to 44, 12.9% from 45 to 64, and 6.9% who were 65 years of age or older. The median age was 27 years. For every 100 females, there were 93.3 males. For every 100 females age 18 and over, there were 94.8 males.

The median income for a household in the village was $45,194, and the median income for a family was $47,426. Males had a median income of $36,827 versus $25,605 for females. The per capita income for the village was $19,170. About 6.3% of families and 7.3% of the population were below the poverty line, including 7.8% of those under age 18 and 29.0% of those age 65 or over.

== Government ==
Somerset's village president is Mike Kappers.

== Education ==
Somerset High School serves students in grades nine through twelve. Somerset Middle School is the local middle school for students in grades five through eight. Somerset Elementary School is the local elementary school for students in junior kindergarten through fourth grade. All of these schools are located on the Somerset School district campus.

== Recreation ==
Somerset has several camping and tubing establishments along the Apple River. Outfitters in the area provide rentals and transportation for tubing on the river. Every summer concerts are held at the Somerset Amphitheater. The Avett Brothers, Slipknot, Ozzy Osbourne, Kenny Chesney, The Lumineers, Hootie and the Blowfish, and Pretty Lights are just some of the previous headliners. Somerset also hosted the Tough Mudder and The Border Battle Beer Fest. Every June, Somerset also holds its annual Pea Soup Days. There's a carnival, parade, and late night band playing. It takes place in the Village Park.

== Notable people ==
- Abigail Boreen, professional ice hockey forward for the Seattle Torrent
- Jenny Hansen, NCAA All-Round Gymnastic Champion
- Samuel Harriman, Union Army general
- Sam Lofquist, ice hockey player
- Michael Schachtner, basketball player
- Patty Schachtner, state senator
