= North Central Hockey Conference =

Wisconsin high school hockey conference (1973-1997)

The North Central Hockey Conference is a former high school athletic conference in northern Wisconsin that sponsored boys hockey. Founded in 1973 and disbanded in 1997, the conference's member schools were affiliated with the Wisconsin Interscholastic Athletic Association.

== History ==
Location of Original North Central Hockey Conference members

The North Central Hockey Conference was founded in 1973 by six programs located in north central Wisconsin: Mosinee, Rhinelander, Stevens Point, Tomahawk, Wausau East and Wausau West. These schools belonged to two conferences that did not sponsor hockey (the Wisconsin Valley and Lumberjack) and grouped together to ensure regular competition amongst its member schools. The conference gained a seventh member in 1974 when Northland Pines in Eagle River joined the group. That number increased to eight in 1977 (D.C. Everest) and nine in 1981 (Antigo). When Pacelli in Stevens Point joined as the conference's tenth member in 1982, the North Central Hockey Conference partitioned its membership into north and south divisions:

| North Division | South Division |
|---|---|
| Antigo | D.C. Everest |
| Northland Pines | Mosinee |
| Rhinelander | Pacelli |
| Wausau East | Stevens Point |
| Wausau West | Tomahawk |

Location of Final North Central Hockey Conference members

This arrangement continued for two more seasons after Pacelli's 1983 exit from the conference, and the nine remaining schools consolidated back down to a single division in 1985. The addition of Waupaca in 1989 brought membership to ten schools, where it would remain for another two years. In 1991, six schools left the conference (Antigo, D.C. Everest, Rhinelander, Stevens Point, Wausau East and Wausau West) when the Wisconsin Valley Conference began sponsorship of boys hockey in their athletic offerings. To offset the losses, the North Central Hockey Conference added Lumberjack members Lakeland Union and Medford to keep the league afloat. The Lumberjack Conference also started sponsorship of hockey in 1991, and four NCHC members (Lakeland Union, Medford, Northland Pines and Tomahawk) maintained dual membership in both organizations before the North Central Hockey Conference was disbanded in 1997. Mosinee and Waupaca joined the Lumberjack Conference as associate members in boys hockey after the North Central Hockey Conference's demise.

== Conference membership history ==
=== Final members ===
| School | Location | Affiliation | Mascot | Colors | Joined | Left | Primary Conference |
|---|---|---|---|---|---|---|---|
| Lakeland Union | Minocqua, WI | Public | Thunderbirds | | 1991 | 1997 | Lumberjack |
| Medford | Medford, WI | Public | Red Raiders | | 1991 | 1997 | Lumberjack |
| Mosinee | Mosinee, WI | Public | Indians | | 1973 | 1997 | Lumberjack, Cloverbelt |
| Northland Pines | Eagle River, WI | Public | Eagles | | 1974 | 1997 | Lumberjack |
| Tomahawk | Tomahawk, WI | Public | Hatchets | | 1973 | 1997 | Lumberjack |
| Waupaca | Waupaca, WI | Public | Comets | | 1989 | 1997 | East Central |

=== Former members ===
| School | Location | Affiliation | Mascot | Colors | Joined | Left | Primary Conference |
|---|---|---|---|---|---|---|---|
| Antigo | Antigo, WI | Public | Red Robins | | 1981 | 1991 | Wisconsin Valley |
| D.C. Everest | Weston, WI | Public | Evergreens | | 1977 | 1991 | Wisconsin Valley |
| Pacelli | Stevens Point, WI | Private (Catholic) | Cardinals | | 1982 | 1983 | Central Wisconsin Catholic |
| Rhinelander | Rhinelander, WI | Public | Hodags | | 1973 | 1991 | Wisconsin Valley |
| Stevens Point | Stevens Point, WI | Public | Panthers | | 1973 | 1991 | Wisconsin Valley |
| Wausau East | Wausau, WI | Public | Lumberjacks | | 1973 | 1991 | Wisconsin Valley |
| Wausau West | Wausau, WI | Public | Warriors | | 1973 | 1991 | Wisconsin Valley |

== Membership timeline ==
North Division South Division

== List of state champions ==
| School | Year |
|---|---|
| Northland Pines | 1984 |
| Northland Pines | 1986 |
| Northland Pines | 1989 |

== List of conference champions ==
| School | Quantity | Years |
|---|---|---|
| Northland Pines | 15 | 1975, 1977, 1978, 1979, 1980, 1981, 1983, 1984, 1987, 1989, 1990, 1992, 1993, 1994, 1996 |
| Mosinee | 6 | 1974, 1984, 1992, 1995, 1996, 1997 |
| Stevens Point | 6 | 1976, 1981, 1982, 1983, 1985, 1986 |
| Wausau West | 3 | 1985, 1988, 1991 |
| Wausau East | 1 | 1974 |
| Antigo | 0 | |
| D.C. Everest | 0 | |
| Lakeland Union | 0 | |
| Medford | 0 | |
| Pacelli | 0 | |
| Rhinelander | 0 | |
| Waupaca | 0 | |
