= Northern Wisconsin Conference =

Wisconsin high school athletic conference (1955-1956)

The Northern Wisconsin Conference is a former high school athletic conference in north central Wisconsin. The conference only existed for one season (1955-1956), and all members were affiliated with the Wisconsin Interscholastic Athletic Association.

== History ==
Location of Northern Wisconsin Conference Members

The origin of the Northern Wisconsin Conference lies in the competitive imbalance that developed in the Wisconsin Valley Conference. The WVC was formed in 1921 and is one of the oldest conferences still operating in Wisconsin. It consisted of the largest high schools in the north central part of the state, and Wausau High School was widely considered the most powerful school in the conference from an athletic standpoint. Their football program, led by Hall of Fame coach Win Brockmeyer, had produced numerous conference championships, a record 46-game winning streak, two Hall of Fame players (Elroy "Crazylegs" Hirsch and Jim Otto) and a Heisman Trophy winner (Bruce Smith, Minnesota, 1941). The smaller schools found it difficult to compete, and by the early 1950s, schools like Nekoosa and Tomahawk began to leave the WVC to seek out more competitive options elsewhere.

In 1955, the four smallest schools in the Wisconsin Valley Conference (Antigo, Marshfield, Merrill and Rhinelander) left to form the Northern Wisconsin Conference. The three remaining schools (Stevens Point, Wausau and Wisconsin Rapids Lincoln) continued interscholastic competition under the WVC banner, and the Northern Wisconsin Conference schools continued to schedule Lincoln and Stevens Point as regular non-conference opponents. The four NWC schools excluded Wausau from any athletic competition, and scheduling became difficult due to their size. In 1956, Wausau joined with four other large high schools (Eau Claire, La Crosse Central, Marinette and Menominee (Michigan)) to form the Big Rivers Conference, and the two remaining WVC schools (Lincoln and Stevens Point) rejoined with the four NWC schools to reform the Wisconsin Valley Conference.

== Conference membership history ==
School	Location	Affiliation	Mascot	Colors	Joined	Left	Conference Joined	Current Conference
Antigo	Antigo, WI	Public	Red Robins		1955	1956	Wisconsin Valley	Great Northern
Marshfield	Marshfield, WI	Public	Tigers		1955	1956	Wisconsin Valley	
Merrill	Merrill, WI	Public	Bluejays		1955	1956	Wisconsin Valley	Great Northern
Rhinelander	Rhinelander, WI	Public	Hodags		1955	1956	Wisconsin Valley	Great Northern
