= Great Northern Conference =

Wisconsin high school athletic conference

The Great Northern Conference is a high school athletic conference based in north central Wisconsin. Founded in 2008, the conference and its member schools belong to the Wisconsin Interscholastic Athletic Association.

== History ==
The Great Northern Conference was formed in 2008 by seven medium-sized high schools in north central Wisconsin. Four of its original members (Lakeland Union, Medford, Northland Pines and Tomahawk) were previously members of the Lumberjack Conference, which had disbanded the year prior. Two schools joined from the Wisconsin Valley Conference (Antigo and Merrill) and Mosinee moved over from the Cloverbelt Conference. For Antigo and Merrill, this move grouped them with schools more in line with their enrollment size instead of being two of the smallest schools in their former conference. Two years after the Great Northern Conference was formed, Merrill swapped affiliations with Wisconsin Valley Conference member Rhinelander. They rejoined in 2025 from the Wisconsin Valley Conference, bringing the Great Northern Conference's membership group to eight schools.

== List of member schools ==
=== Current full members ===
School	Location	Affiliation	Enrollment	Mascot	Colors	Joined
Antigo	Antigo, WI	Public	647	Red Robins		2008
Lakeland Union	Minocqua, WI	Public	713	Thunderbirds		2008
Medford	Medford, WI	Public	667	Raiders		2008
Merrill	Merrill, WI	Public	727	Bluejays		2008, 2025
Mosinee	Mosinee, WI	Public	556	Indians		2008
Northland Pines	Eagle River, WI	Public	404	Eagles		2008
Rhinelander	Rhinelander, WI	Public	718	Hodags		2010
Tomahawk	Tomahawk, WI	Public	372	Hatchets		2008

=== Current associate members ===
School	Location	Affiliation	Mascot	Colors	Primary Conference	Sports
Ashland	Ashland, WI	Public	Oredockers		Heart O'North	Gymnastics, (Note: Co-operative with Drummond, Mellen and Washburn) Boys Tennis
Colby	Colby, WI	Public	Hornets		Cloverbelt	Girls Swim & Dive (Note: Co-operative with Abbotsford)
Columbus Catholic	Marshfield, WI	Private (Catholic)	Dons		Marawood	Girls Tennis
Marshfield	Marshfield, WI	Public	Tigers		Wisconsin Valley	Gymnastics
Newman Catholic	Wausau, WI	Private (Catholic)	Cardinals		Marawood	Girls Tennis
Pacelli	Stevens Point, WI	Private (Catholic)	Cardinals		Central Wisconsin	Boys Tennis, Girls Tennis
Phillips	Phillips, WI	Public	Loggers		Marawood	Girls Tennis
Shawano	Shawano, WI	Public	Hawks		Bay	Boys Swim & Dive
Stevens Point	Stevens Point, WI	Public	Panthers		Wisconsin Valley	Gymnastics
Waupaca	Waupaca, WI	Public	Comets		North Eastern	Boys Hockey
Wausau East	Wausau, WI	Public	Lumberjacks		Wisconsin Valley	Football
Wisconsin Rapids	Wisconsin Rapids, WI	Public	Red Raiders		Wisconsin Valley	Gymnastics

=== Current co-operative members ===
Team	Colors	Host School	Co-operative Members	Sport(s)
Trident Swim Team		Ladysmith	Bloomer, Bruce, Flambeau, Lake Holcombe	Girls Swim & Dive

=== Future associate members ===
School	Location	Affiliation	Mascot	Colors	Joining	Sports	Primary Conference
Shawano	Shawano, WI	Public	Hawks		2027	Boys Hockey (Note: Co-operative with Bonduel)	Bay

=== Former associate members ===
School	Location	Affiliation	Mascot	Colors	Seasons	Sports	Primary Conference
Ashland	Ashland, WI	Public	Oredockers		2011-2023	Football	Lake Superior, Heart O'North
Merrill	Merrill, WI	Public	Bluejays		2011-2024	Football	Wisconsin Valley
Hayward	Hayward, WI	Public	Hurricanes		2020-2023	Football	Heart O'North

== Membership map ==
Great Northern Conference
Location of Great Northern Conference full members:
1 Antigo
2 Lakeland Union
3 Medford
4 Merrill
5 Mosinee
6 Northland Pines
7 Rhinelander
8 Tomahawk

== Sponsored sports ==
	Baseball	Boys Basketball	Girls Basketball	Boys Cross Country	Girls Cross Country	Football	Boys Golf	Gymnastics	Boys Hockey	Boys Soccer	Girls Soccer	Softball	Boys Swim & Dive	Girls Swim & Dive	Boys Tennis	Girls Tennis	Boys Track & Field	Girls Track & Field	Girls Volleyball	Boys Wrestling	Girls Wrestling
Antigo	●	●	●	●	●	●	●	●	● (Note: Co-operative with Wittenberg-Birnamwood)	●	●	●	●	●	●	●	●	●	●	●	●
Lakeland Union	●	●	●	●	●	●	●	● (Note: Co-operative with Northland Pines)	●	●	●	●	●	●	●	●	●	●	●	●	●
Medford	●	●	●	●	●	●	●	● (Note: Co-operative with Thorp)	● (Note: Co-operative with Abbotsford, Edgar and Rib Lake)	●	●	●	●	●	●	●	●	●	●	●	●
Merrill	●	●	●	●	●	●	●		●	●	●	●		●		●	●	●	●	●	●
Mosinee	●	●	●	●	●	●	●	● (Note: Co-operative with Pacelli and Stratford)	●	●	●	●		●			●	●	●	●	●
Northland Pines	●	●	●	●	●		●		●	●	●	●					●	●	●		
Rhinelander	●	●	●	●	●	●	●	●	● (Note: Co-operative with Laona, Phelps and Three Lakes)	●	●	●	●	●	●	●	●	●	●	●	●
Tomahawk	●	●	●	●	●	●	●		●			●	●	●			●	●	●	●	●

== List of state champions ==
=== Fall sports ===
Boys Cross Country
School	Year	Division
Tomahawk	2008	Division 2
Lakeland Union	2016	Division 2

Girls Cross Country
School	Year	Division
Medford	2018	Division 2

Girls Swimming & Diving
School	Year	Division
Rhinelander	2020	Division 2
Rhinelander	2023	Division 2

=== Winter sports ===
Boys Hockey
School	Year	Division
Tomahawk	2025	Division 2
Northland Pines	2026	Division 2

Boys Swimming & Diving
School	Year	Division
Rhinelander	2023	Division 2

=== Spring sports ===
Baseball
School	Year	Division
Antigo	2019	Division 2

Boys Golf
School	Year	Division
Lakeland Union	2024	Division 2

Softball
School	Year	Division
Mosinee	2014	Division 2

== List of conference champions ==
=== Boys Basketball ===
School	Quantity	Years
Rhinelander	8	2013, 2014, 2015, 2016, 2018, 2024, 2025, 2026
Mosinee	5	2016, 2019, 2022, 2023, 2026
Antigo	4	2009, 2010, 2011, 2012
Medford	4	2017, 2020, 2021, 2023
Lakeland Union	0	
Merrill	0	
Northland Pines	0	
Tomahawk	0	

=== Girls Basketball ===
School	Quantity	Years
Lakeland Union	7	2011, 2015, 2017, 2018, 2023, 2024, 2025
Mosinee	5	2014, 2016, 2021, 2022, 2026
Medford	3	2010, 2012, 2013
Rhinelander	2	2019, 2020
Antigo	1	2009
Merrill	1	2009
Northland Pines	1	2013
Tomahawk	0	

=== Football ===
School	Quantity	Years
Medford	8	2012, 2013, 2015, 2016, 2019, 2020, 2024, 2026
Mosinee	6	2011, 2012, 2021, 2022, 2023, 2025
Antigo	5	2008, 2010, 2015, 2016, 2017
Merrill	3	2009, 2014, 2016
Ashland	1	2018
Lakeland Union	1	2008
Tomahawk	1	2025
Hayward	0	
Rhinelander	0	
Wausau East	0	

=== Boys Hockey ===
School	Quantity	Years
Northland Pines	7	2011, 2012, 2013, 2018, 2019, 2020, 2021
Antigo	5	2014, 2015, 2016, 2017, 2018
Lakeland Union	4	2009, 2022, 2023, 2024
Tomahawk	3	2024, 2025, 2026
Mosinee	2	2021, 2023
Rhinelander	1	2021
Waupaca	1	2010
Medford	0	
Merrill	0	
