= Valley Football Association =

Wisconsin high school football conference (2011-2023)

The Valley Football Association is a former high school football conference with its membership based northeastern and central Wisconsin. Active from the 2011 through 2023 football seasons, the conference and its member schools were affiliated with the Wisconsin Interscholastic Athletic Association.

== History ==
Location of Original Valley Football Association Members

The Valley Football Association was born from a merger of the football-playing members of two conferences for large high schools in eastern and central Wisconsin: the Fox Valley Association and the Wisconsin Valley Conference. The WVC was set to have only six football participants for the 2011 season, which created problems with scheduling nonconference opponents to fill game dates. Competition commenced with the 2011 football season, and the sixteen member schools were broken out into two divisions:

VFA North Division	VFA South Division
Appleton East	Fond du Lac
Appleton North	Marshfield
Appleton West	Menasha
D.C. Everest	Neenah
Kaukauna	Oshkosh North
Kimberly	Oshkosh West
Wausau East	Stevens Point
Wausau West	Wisconsin Rapids

In 2014, Hortonville replaced original member Menasha, who departed the VFA for the Bay Conference. Three years later, Wausau East left the VFA to compete as an independent school for football, prompting the realignment of the conference into three five-team divisions:

VFA North Division	VFA South Division	VFA West Division
Appleton East	Fond du Lac	D.C. Everest
Appleton North	Hortonville	Marshfield
Appleton West	Neenah	Stevens Point
Kaukauna	Oshkosh North	Wausau West
Kimberly	Oshkosh West	Wisconsin Rapids

Only five VFA members competed in the 2020 season due to the COVID-19 pandemic. Those teams, alongside returning member Wausau East, competed in a single division. The members that went on hiatus played in spring 2021 in the temporary Fox Valley Classic Conference with members of the original Fox River Classic Conference and the Wisconsin Valley Conference. Of those teams, only Appleton West and Stevens Point returned to the VFA, while the remaining teams returned to the Fox Valley Association for football. The Valley Football Association name was in use until the 2023 football season, when the conference reverted back to the Wisconsin Valley Conference nomenclature for the 2024-2025 competition cycle.

== Conference membership history ==
School	Location	Affiliation	Mascot	Colors	Seasons	Primary Conference
Appleton East	Appleton, WI	Public	Patriots		2011–2019	Fox Valley Association
Appleton North	Appleton, WI	Public	Lightning		2011–2019	Fox Valley Association
Appleton West	Appleton, WI	Public	Terrors		2011–2019, 2021–2023	Fox Valley Association
D.C. Everest	Weston, WI	Public	Evergreens		2011–2023	Wisconsin Valley
Fond du Lac	Fond du Lac, WI	Public	Cardinals		2011–2019	Fox Valley Association
Kaukauna	Kaukauna, WI	Public	Galloping Ghosts		2011–2019	Fox Valley Association
Kimberly	Kimberly, WI	Public	Papermakers		2011–2019	Fox Valley Association
Marshfield	Marshfield, WI	Public	Tigers		2011–2023	Wisconsin Valley
Menasha	Menasha, WI	Public	Blue Jays		2011–2013	Fox Valley Association
Neenah	Neenah, WI	Public	Rockets		2011–2019	Fox Valley Association
Oshkosh North	Oshkosh, WI	Public	Spartans		2011–2019	Fox Valley Association
Oshkosh West	Oshkosh, WI	Public	Wildcats		2011–2019	Fox Valley Association
Stevens Point	Stevens Point, WI	Public	Panthers		2011–2019, 2021–2023	Wisconsin Valley
Wausau East	Wausau, WI	Public	Lumberjacks		2011–2016, 2020–2023	Wisconsin Valley
Wausau West	Wausau, WI	Public	Warriors		2011–2023	Wisconsin Valley
Wisconsin Rapids	Wisconsin Rapids, WI	Public	Red Raiders		2011–2023	Wisconsin Valley
Hortonville	Hortonville, WI	Public	Polar Bears		2014–2023	Fox Valley Association

== Membership timeline ==
North Division South Division West Division

== List of state champions ==
Source
School	Year	Division
Kimberly	2013	Division 2
Kimberly	2014	Division 1
Kimberly	2015	Division 1
Kimberly	2016	Division 1
Kimberly	2017	Division 1

== List of conference and division champions ==
=== 2011-2019 ===
==== North Division ====
School	Quantity	Years
Kimberly	8	2011, 2013, 2014, 2015, 2016, 2017, 2018, 2019
Appleton North	2	2011, 2012
D.C. Everest	0	
Wausau West	0	
Appleton East	0	
Appleton West	0	
Hortonville	0	
Kaukauna	0	
Wausau East	0	

==== South Division ====
School	Quantity	Years
Fond du Lac	4	2015, 2017, 2018, 2019
Oshkosh North	2	2013, 2014
Stevens Point	2	2012, 2016
Marshfield	1	2012
Wisconsin Rapids	1	2011
Hortonville	0	
Menasha	0	
Neenah	0	
Oshkosh West	0	

==== West Division ====
School	Quantity	Years
Marshfield	3	2017, 2018, 2019
Wisconsin Rapids	1	2017
D.C. Everest	0	
Stevens Point	0	
Wausau West	0	

=== 2020-2023 ===
School	Quantity	Years
Stevens Point	2	2021, 2023
Wausau West	2	2021, 2022
Wisconsin Rapids	2	2021, 2022
D.C. Everest	1	2020
Marshfield	1	2022
Appleton West	0	
Hortonville	0	
Wausau East	0	
