= Griem =

Griem is a surname. Notable people with this name include:

- Breta Luther Griem (1897–1980), American dietitian and television host
- Hans R. Griem (1928–2019), German-American physicist
- Helmut Griem (1932–2004), German actor and director
