= 2018–19 Marquette Golden Eagles men's basketball team =

American college basketball season

2018–19 Marquette Golden Eagles men's basketball
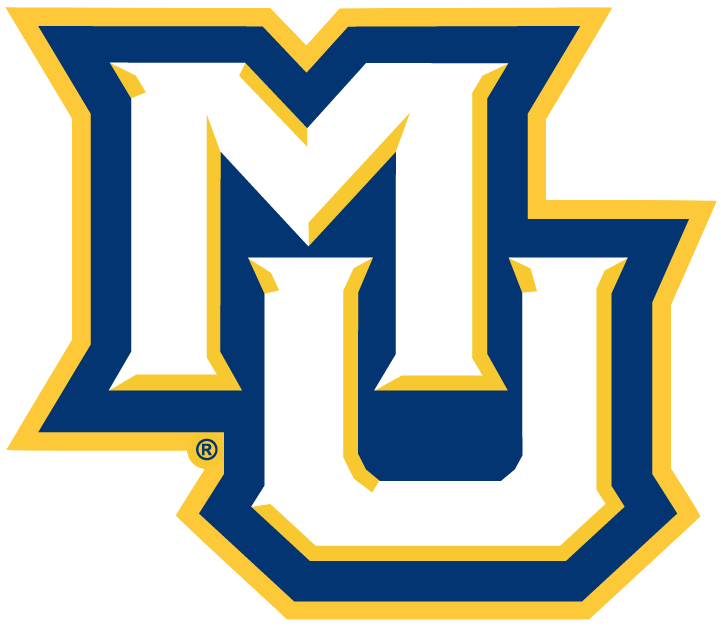

NCAA tournament, First Round
- Conference: Big East Conference
- Record: 24–10 (12–6 Big East)
- Head coach: Steve Wojciechowski (5th season)
- Assistant coaches: Dwayne Killings; Stan Johnson; Brett Nelson
- Home arena: Fiserv Forum

2018–19 Big East men's basketball standings
	Conf.				Overall
Team	W		L	PCT	W		L	PCT
No. 23 Villanova †	13	–	5	.722	26	–	10	.722
Marquette	12	–	6	.667	24	–	10	.706
Seton Hall	9	–	9	.500	20	–	14	.588
Xavier	9	–	9	.500	19	–	16	.543
Creighton	9	–	9	.500	20	–	15	.571
Georgetown	9	–	9	.500	19	–	14	.576
St. John's	8	–	10	.444	21	–	13	.618
Providence	7	–	11	.389	18	–	16	.529
Butler	7	–	11	.389	16	–	17	.485
DePaul	7	–	11	.389	19	–	17	.528
† 2019 Big East tournament winner Rankings from AP Poll

The 2018–19 Marquette Golden Eagles men's basketball team represented Marquette University in the 2018–19 NCAA Division I men's basketball season. The Golden Eagles, led by fifth-year head coach Steve Wojciechowski, played their home games for the first time at Fiserv Forum as members of the Big East Conference. They finished the season 24–10, to finish for 2nd place. In the Big East tournament, they defeated St John’s in the Quarterfinals before losing to Seton Hall in the semifinals. They received an at-large bid to the NCAA Tournament where they were upset by Murray State in the First Round.

== Previous season ==
The Golden Eagles finished the 2017–18 season 21–14, 9–9 in Big East play to finish in a tie for sixth place. As the No. 7 seed in the Big East tournament, they defeated DePaul in the first round before losing to eventual tournament champion Villanova in the quarterfinals. They received an at-large bid to the National Invitation Tournament where they defeated Harvard in the first round and Oregon in the second round before losing to Penn State in the quarterfinals.

The season marked the final season for the Eagles at the BMO Harris Bradley Center.

== Offseason ==
=== Departures ===
Name	Number	Pos.	Height	Weight	Year	Hometown	Reason for departure
Harry Froling	21	C	6'11"	250	Sophomore	Townsville, Australia	Signed with Adelaide 36ers
Andrew Rowsey	30	G	5'11"	180	RS Senior	Lexington, VA	Graduated

=== Incoming transfers ===
Name	Number	Pos.	Height	Weight	Year	Hometown	Previous school
Joseph Chartouny	21	G	6'3"	205	Graduate Student	Montreal, QC	Fordham
Koby McEwen	25	G	6'4"	200	Junior	Toronto, ON	Utah State

=== 2018 recruiting class ===
College recruiting information
Name	Hometown	School	Height	Weight	Commit date
Joey Hauser #13 PF	Stevens Point, WI	Stevens Point Area Senior High School	6 ft 7 in (2.01 m)	210 lb (95 kg)	Jul 23, 2017
Joey Hauser #13 PF	Recruit ratings: Scout: Rivals: (88)				
Overall recruit ranking:
Note: In many cases, Scout, Rivals, 247Sports, On3, and ESPN may conflict in their listings of height and weight.; In these cases, the average was taken. ESPN grades are on a 100-point scale.; Sources: "2018 Team Ranking". Rivals.

== Roster ==
2018–19 Marquette Golden Eagles men's basketball team
Players
Coaches

Pos.	#	Name	Height	Weight	Year	Previous school	Hometown
G	0	Markus Howard	5 ft 11 in (1.8 m)	175 lb (79 kg)	Jr	Findlay Prep	Chandler, Arizona
F	1	Brendan Bailey	6 ft 8 in (2.03 m)	190 lb (86 kg)	Fr	American Fork High School	Salt Lake City, Utah
G/F	2	Sacar Anim	6 ft 5 in (1.96 m)	210 lb (95 kg)	RS Jr	DeLaSalle High School (MN)	Minneapolis, Minnesota
F	4	Theo John	6 ft 9 in (2.06 m)	240 lb (109 kg)	So	Champlin Park High School	Minneapolis, Minnesota
G	5	Greg Elliott	6 ft 3 in (1.91 m)	175 lb (79 kg)	So	East English Village Prep	Detroit, Michigan
G/F	10	Sam Hauser	6 ft 8 in (2.03 m)	225 lb (102 kg)	Jr	Stevens Point Area Senior High School	Stevens Point, Wisconsin
C	12	Matt Heldt	6 ft 10 in (2.08 m)	240 lb (109 kg)	Sr	Neenah High School	Neenah, Wisconsin
F	13	Ike Eke	6 ft 9 in (2.06 m)	220 lb (100 kg)	So	University of Detroit Jesuit High School	Lagos, Nigeria
G	21	Joseph Chartouny	6 ft 3 in (1.91 m)	200 lb (91 kg)	GS	Collège Jean-de-Brébeuf; Fordham	Montreal, Quebec
F	22	Joey Hauser	6 ft 9 in (2.06 m)	230 lb (104 kg)	RS Fr	Stevens Point Area Senior High School	Stevens Point, Wisconsin
F	23	Jamal Cain	6 ft 7 in (2.01 m)	195 lb (88 kg)	So	Cornerstone Health & Technology High School	Pontiac, Michigan
G	25	Koby McEwen (redshirt)	6 ft 4 in (1.93 m)	200 lb (91 kg)	Jr	Wasatch Academy; Utah State	Toronto, Ontario
F	30	Ed Morrow	6 ft 7 in (2.01 m)	235 lb (107 kg)	RS Jr	Simeon Academy; Nebraska	Chicago, Illinois
F	40	Tommy Gardiner (W)	6 ft 7 in (2.01 m)	210 lb (95 kg)	Fr	Maine South High School	Park Ridge, Illinois
G	41	Mike Lelito (W)	6 ft 5 in (1.96 m)	190 lb (86 kg)	RS So	John Hersey High School	Mt. Prospect, Illinois
G	42	Buddy Jaffee (W)	6 ft 3 in (1.91 m)	195 lb (88 kg)	Fr	Marquette High School	Michigan City, Indiana
G	52	Cam Marotta (W)	5 ft 10 in (1.78 m)	175 lb (79 kg)	Sr	Homestead High School (WI)	Mequon, Wisconsin

Head coach

- Steve Wojciechowski (Duke)

Assistant coach(es)

- Dwayne Killings (Hampton)
- Brett Nelson (Florida)
- Stan Johnson (Southern Utah)

Legend

- (C) Team captain
- (S) Suspended
- (I) Ineligible
- (W) Walk-on
- Injured
- Current redshirt

Roster

=== Depth chart ===
Pos.	Starting 5	Bench 1	Bench 2	Bench 3
C	Theo John	Matt Heldt
PF	Joey Hauser	Ed Morrow	Jamal Cain	Tommy Gardiner (W)
SF	Sam Hauser	Brendan Bailey
SG	Sacar Anim	Mike Lelito (W)	Greg Elliott	Buddy Jaffee (W)
PG	Markus Howard	Joseph Chartouny	Cam Marotta (W)

== Schedule and results ==
Date time, TV	Rank^{#}	Opponent^{#}	Result	Record	High points	High rebounds	High assists	Site (attendance) city, state
Exhibition
October 30, 2018*; 7:00 pm		Carroll (WI)	W 87–44		17 – Anim	6 – Tied	9 – Chartouny	Fiserv Forum (13,110); Milwaukee, WI
Non-conference regular season
November 6, 2018*; 8:00 pm, FS1		UMBC	W 67–42	1–0	15 – Tied	10 – John	7 – Howard	Fiserv Forum (14,103); Milwaukee, WI
November 10, 2018*; 3:00 pm, FS2		Bethune–Cookman; NIT Season Tip-Off campus game	W 92–59	2–0	37 – Howard	8 – Howard	6 – J. Hauser	Fiserv Forum (14,409); Milwaukee, WI
November 14, 2018*; 7:30 pm, FS1	No. 24	at Indiana; Gavitt Tipoff Games	L 73–96	2–1	18 – Tied	7 – Cain	4 – Howard	Simon Skjodt Assembly Hall (17,222); Bloomington, IN
November 17, 2018*; 12:00 pm, FSN	No. 24	Presbyterian; NIT Season Tip-Off campus game	W 74–55	3–1	19 – S. Hauser	10 – S. Hauser	6 – Howard	Fiserv Forum (14,058); Milwaukee, WI
November 22, 2018*; 6:00 pm, ESPN2		vs. No. 2 Kansas; NIT Season Tip-Off semifinal	L 68–77	3–2	20 – S. Hauser	6 – S. Hauser	8 – Chartouny	Barclays Center (4,981); Brooklyn, NY
November 23, 2018*; 6:00 pm, ESPN2		vs. Louisville; NIT Season Tip-Off	W 77–74 ^{OT}	4–2	22 – S. Hauser	7 – Tied	5 – Howard	Barclays Center (5,491); Brooklyn, NY
November 27, 2018*; 7:00 pm, FSN		Charleston Southern	W 76–55	5–2	17 – Howard	7 – Tied	6 – Chartouny	Fiserv Forum (12,892); Milwaukee, WI
December 1, 2018*; 1:30 pm, FS1		No. 12 Kansas State	W 83–71	6–2	45 – Howard	7 – Chartouny	5 – Chartouny	Fiserv Forum (15,517); Milwaukee, WI
December 4, 2018*; 7:30 pm, FS1		UTEP	W 76–69	7–2	21 – Howard	10 – S. Hauser	5 – Howard	Fiserv Forum (13,064); Milwaukee, WI
December 8, 2018*; 4:00 pm, FOX		No. 12 Wisconsin; Rivalry	W 74–69 ^{OT}	8–2	27 – Howard	14 – S. Hauser	4 – Tied	Fiserv Forum (17,515); Milwaukee, WI
December 18, 2018*; 8:00 pm, FSN	No. 20	North Dakota	W 92–66	9–2	26 – Howard	10 – J. Hauser	6 – J. Hauser	Fiserv Forum (13,603); Milwaukee, WI
December 21, 2018*; 7:30 pm, FS1	No. 20	No. 14 Buffalo	W 103–85	10–2	45 – Howard	9 – Tied	4 – Howard	Fiserv Forum (17,567); Milwaukee, WI
December 28, 2018*; 7:00 pm, FS1	No. 18	Southern	W 84–41	11–2	26 – Howard	9 – Tied	3 – Tied	Fiserv Forum (16,075); Milwaukee, WI
Big East regular season
January 1, 2019; 6:00 pm, FS1	No. 16	at St. John's	L 69–89	11–3 (0–1)	15 – J. Hauser	7 – S. Hauser	4 – S. Hauser	Carnesecca Arena (5,602); Queens, NY
January 6, 2019; 11:00 am, FOX	No. 16	Xavier	W 70–52	12–3 (1–1)	26 – Howard	10 – Morrow	8 – Howard	Fiserv Forum (17,309); Milwaukee, WI
January 9, 2019; 6:00 pm, CBSSN	No. 21	at Creighton	W 106–104 ^{OT}	13–3 (2–1)	53 – Howard	10 – S. Hauser	6 – Howard	CHI Health Center Omaha (17,085); Omaha, NE
January 12, 2019; 1:00 pm, FS1	No. 21	Seton Hall	W 70–66	14–3 (3–1)	25 – Howard	11 – John	6 – Howard	Fiserv Forum (17,180); Milwaukee, WI
January 15, 2019; 7:45 pm, FS1	No. 15	at Georgetown	W 74–71	15–3 (4–1)	31 – S. Hauser	8 – Tie	6 – J. Hauser	Capital One Arena (7,945); Washington, D.C.
January 20, 2019; 11:00 am, CBSSN	No. 15	Providence	W 79–68	16–3 (5–1)	25 – S. Hauser	9 – Howard	4 – S. Hauser	Fiserv Forum (17,524); Milwaukee, WI
January 23, 2019; 7:30 pm, FS1	No. 12	DePaul	W 79–69	17–3 (6–1)	23 – Howard	10 – John	9 – Howard	Fiserv Forum (14,283); Milwaukee, WI
January 26, 2019; 1:00 pm, FS1	No. 12	at Xavier	W 87–82	18–3 (7–1)	31 – Howard	9 – S. Hauser	4 – Howard	Cintas Center (10,547); Cincinnati, OH
January 30, 2019; 5:30 pm, FS1	No. 10	at Butler	W 76–58	19–3 (8–1)	32 – Howard	8 – J. Hauser	2 – Tied	Hinkle Fieldhouse (8,292); Indianapolis, IN
February 5, 2019; 7:00 pm, FS1	No. 10	St. John's	L 69–70	19–4 (8–2)	19 – S. Hauser	11 – S. Hauser	5 – Tied	Fiserv Forum (14,030); Milwaukee, WI
February 9, 2019; 1:30 pm, FOX	No. 10	No. 14 Villanova	W 66–65	20–4 (9–2)	38 – Howard	7 – John	5 – J. Hauser	Fiserv Forum (17,856); Milwaukee, WI
February 12, 2019; 7:30 pm, FSN	No. 10	at DePaul	W 92–73	21–4 (10–2)	36 – Howard	6 – John	4 – S. Hauser	Wintrust Arena (6,836); Chicago, IL
February 20, 2019; 8:00 pm, CBSSN	No. 11	Butler	W 79–69	22–4 (11–2)	28 – Howard	11 – John	4 – Tied	Fiserv Forum (14,600); Milwaukee, WI
February 23, 2019; 11:00 am, FOX	No. 11	at Providence	W 76–58	23–4 (12–2)	18 – Tied	13 – S. Hauser	4 – Anim	Dunkin' Donuts Center (12,890); Providence, RI
February 27, 2019; 8:00 pm, FS1	No. 10	at Villanova	L 61–67	23–5 (12–3)	25 – Howard	7 – S. Hauser	4 – Howard	Finneran Pavilion (6,501); Villanova, PA
March 3, 2019; 2:00 pm, FS1	No. 10	Creighton	L 60–66	23–6 (12–4)	33 – Howard	10 – S. Hauser	5 – J. Hauser	Fiserv Forum (17,512); Milwaukee, WI
March 6, 2019; 5:30 pm, FS1	No. 16	at Seton Hall	L 64–73	23–7 (12–5)	25 – Hauser	9 – Hauser	5 – Howard	Prudential Center (9,080); Newark, NJ
March 9, 2019; 1:40 pm, FOX	No. 16	Georgetown	L 84–86	23–8 (12–6)	28 – Howard	11 – Morrow	5 – S. Hauser	Fiserv Forum (17,514); Milwaukee, WI
Big East tournament
March 14, 2019; 6:00 pm, FS1	(2) No. 23	vs. (7) St. Johns; Quarterfinals	W 86–54	24–8	30 – Howard	8 – Tied	5 – S. Hauser	Madison Square Garden (19,812); New York, NY
March 15, 2019; 8:00 pm, FS1	(2) No. 23	vs. (3) Seton Hall; Semifinals	L 79–81	24–9	22 – Hauser	9 – Hauser	4 – Howard	Madison Square Garden (19,812); New York, NY
NCAA tournament
March 21, 2019*; 3:30 pm, TBS	(5 W)	vs. (12 W) Murray State; First Round	L 64–83	24–10	26 – Howard	10 – Morrow	2 – Tied	XL Center (14,838); Hartford, CT
*Non-conference game. ^{#}Rankings from AP Poll. (#) Tournament seedings in parentheses. W=West. All times are in Central Time.

== Rankings ==
Ranking movements Legend: ██ Increase in ranking ██ Decrease in ranking — = Not ranked RV = Received votes т = Tied with team above or below
	Week																				
Poll	Pre	1	2	3	4	5	6	7	8	9	10	11	12	13	14	15	16	17	18	19	Final
AP	RV	24	RV	—	RV	21	20	18	16	21	15	12	10	10	10	11	10	16	23	RV	Not released
Coaches	RV	RV^	RV	—	RV	RV	23	20	18	19	13	11	9	9	10	10	9	15	22	25-T	RV

*AP does not release post-NCAA Tournament rankings
^Coaches did not release a Week 2 poll.
