= Joey Hauser =

American basketball player (born 1999)

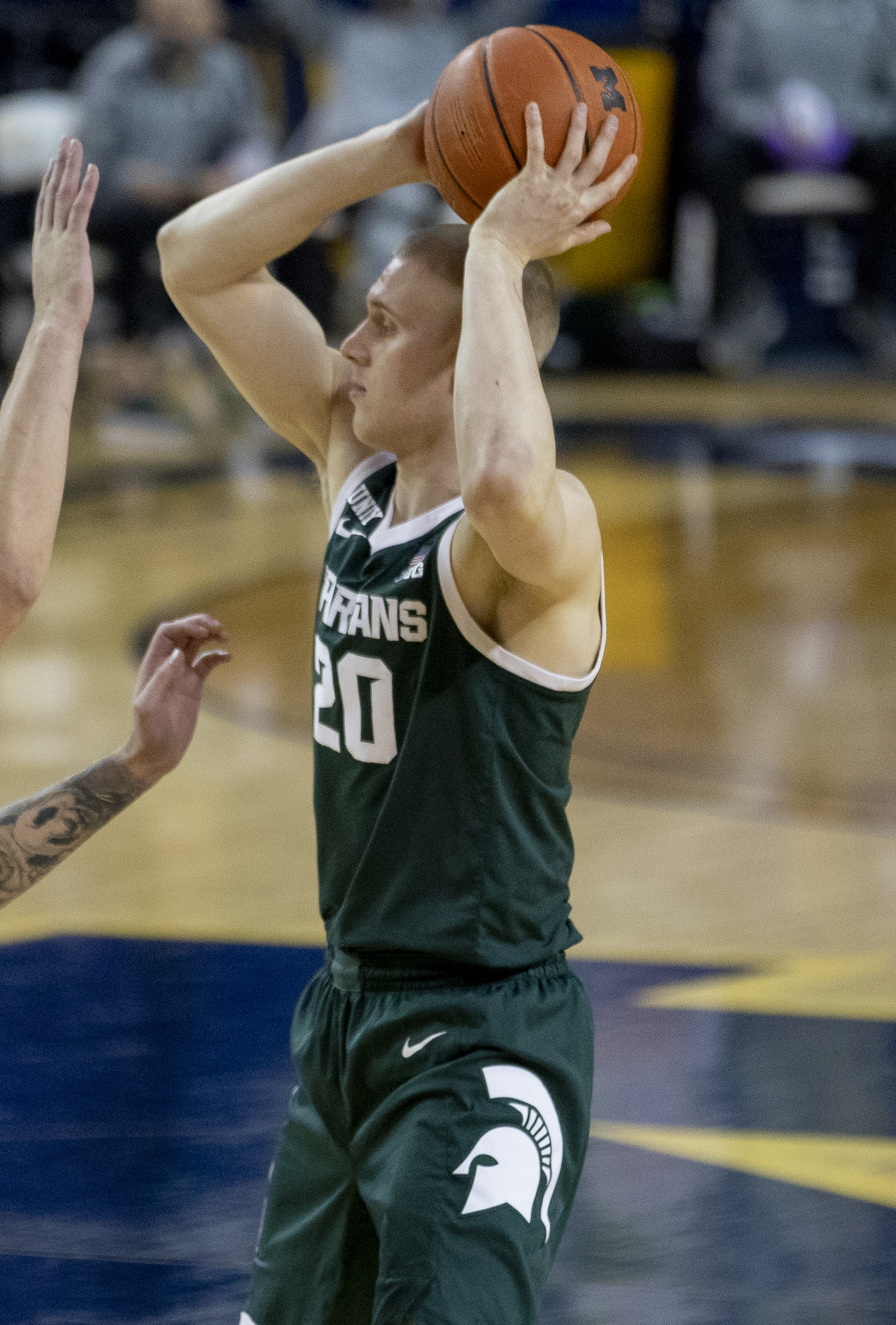
- Hauser with Michigan State in 2021

Brooklyn Nets
- Title: Video Assistant
- League: NBA

Personal information
- Born: July 17, 1999 (age 27) Green Bay, Wisconsin, U.S.
- Listed height: 6 ft 9 in (2.06 m)
- Listed weight: 230 lb (104 kg)

Career information
- High school: Stevens Point Area (Stevens Point, Wisconsin)
- College: Marquette (2018–2019); Michigan State (2020–2023)
- NBA draft: 2023: undrafted
- Playing career: 2023–2025
- Position: Power forward
- Number: 14

Career history

Playing
- 2023–2024: Ontario Clippers
- 2024–2025: College Park Skyhawks

Coaching
- 2025–present: Brooklyn Nets (video assistant)

Career highlights
- Big East All-Freshman Team (2019)
- Stats at NBA.com
- Stats at Basketball Reference

Joey Hauser (born July 17, 1999) is an American former professional basketball player who currently serves as a video assistant for the Brooklyn Nets of the National Basketball Association (NBA). He played college basketball for the Michigan State Spartans and Marquette Golden Eagles.

== High school career ==
Hauser attended Stevens Point Area Senior High School in Stevens Point, Wisconsin. He helped his team win three straight Division 1 state titles. As a junior, he averaged 23.6 points, 11.5 rebounds and 5.1 assists per game, earning unanimous All-State and Wisconsin Valley Conference Co-Player of the Year recognition. In December 2017, he suffered a season-ending ankle injury which required surgery, re-aggravating an existing injury. One month later, Hauser graduated early from high school. A four-star recruit, he committed to playing college basketball for Marquette over offers from Wisconsin and Michigan State, among others.

== College career ==
After graduating early from high school, Hauser enrolled at Marquette for the spring 2018 semester due to an open scholarship on the team. He sat out as a redshirt while rehabilitating from his ankle injury. On January 26, 2019, Hauser scored a freshman season-high 21 points in an 87–82 win over Xavier. As a freshman, he averaged 9.7 points and 5.3 rebounds per game. He was named to the Big East All-Freshman Team and was a five-time Big East Freshman of the Week selection. After the season, Hauser transferred to Michigan State. He sat out his next season due to National Collegiate Athletic Association transfer rules, with his appeal for immediate eligibility being denied. Hauser averaged 9.7 points and 5.6 rebounds per game as a redshirt junior, and earned First-team Academic All-District recognition.

== Professional career ==
=== Ontario Clippers (2023–2024) ===
After going undrafted in the 2023 NBA draft, Hauser signed a two-way contract with the Utah Jazz on July 3, 2023, but was waived on October 13. On October 20, he signed with the Los Angeles Clippers, but was waived the next day and on October 30, he joined the Ontario Clippers.

=== College Park Skyhawks (2024–2025) ===
On September 19, 2024, Hauser signed with the Atlanta Hawks. However, he was waived four days later. On October 26, he joined the College Park Skyhawks.

== Coaching career ==
In July 2025, Hauser was hired to serve as a video assistant for the Brooklyn Nets of the National Basketball Association.

== Career statistics ==
Legend
GP	Games played	GS	Games started	MPG	Minutes per game
FG%	Field goal percentage	3P%	3-point field goal percentage	FT%	Free throw percentage
RPG	Rebounds per game	APG	Assists per game	SPG	Steals per game
BPG	Blocks per game	PPG	Points per game	**Bold**	Career high

=== College ===
Year	Team	GP	GS	MPG	FG%	3P%	FT%	RPG	APG	SPG	BPG	PPG
2018–19	Marquette	**34**	**31**	**29.2**	.447	**.425**	**.791**	5.3	**2.4**	**.4**	.1	**9.7**
2019–20	Michigan State	Redshirt										
2020–21	Michigan State	28	16	21.5	**.475**	.340	.721	**5.6**	1.4	**.4**	**.2**	**9.7**
2021–22	Michigan State	35	29	22.2	.446	.408	.862	5.3	1.7	.3	.2	7.3
2022–23	Michigan State	32	32	33.9	.488	.465	.871	7.0	1.9	.4	.2	14.3
Career		129	108	26.8	.466	.416	.811	5.8	1.9	.4	.2	10.2

== Personal life ==
Hauser is the son of Dave and Stephanie Hauser. Hauser's older brother, Sam, played college basketball with him at Marquette before transferring to Virginia; he currently plays in the NBA for the Boston Celtics. Sam won an NBA championship with the Celtics in 2024. They also played together in high school. Hauser also has an older sister, Nicole Hauser who played volleyball at Southern Connecticut State University.
