= Crazylegs (film) =

1953 film by Francis D. Lyon

- Directed by: Francis D. Lyon
- Written by: Hall Bartlett
- Based on: Life of Elroy Hirsch
- Produced by: Hall Bartlett
- Starring: Elroy 'Crazylegs' Hirsch; Lloyd Nolan; Joan Vohs
- Cinematography: Virgil Miller
- Edited by: Cotton Warburton
- Music by: Leith Stevens
- Production company: Hall Bartlett Productions
- Distributed by: Republic Pictures
- Release date: November 15, 1953 (United States)
- Running time: 87 minutes
- Country: United States
- Language: English

Crazylegs is a 1953 film about Elroy Hirsch's football career. In college (University of Wisconsin and University of Michigan) his unconventional dynamic running style allowed him to change directions in a multitude of ways. The media dubbed him "Crazylegs". The name stuck all through his professional career and life. The bulk of this film is centered on his college days. Crazylegs later became part of the foundation of the "Three End" with the LA Rams. This film captures the genuine quality of Hirsch's personality, with Hirsch playing himself in the part.

The film premiered in Wausau, Wisconsin, Hirsch's hometown. Cotton Warburton's editing was nominated for the Academy Award for Best Film Editing.

== Plot ==
Elroy Hirsch's life is told from his days in a school in Wisconsin and then at the University of Wisconsin where he already excelled in sports. After military service, Elroy becomes a professional athlete and earns the nickname of Crazylegs, by which he became known internationally. An injury almost ends his career, but in a typical case of personal overcoming, he achieves a triumphant return.

== Cast ==
- Elroy "Crazylegs" Hirsch as Himself
- Lloyd Nolan as Win Brockmeyer
- Joan Vohs as Ruth Stahmer
- James Millican as The Rams Head Coach
- Bob Waterfield as Himself
- Bob Kelley as Himself
- James Brown as Bill
- Norman Field as Mr. Otto Hirsch
- Louise Lorimer as Mrs. Otto Hirsch
- Joseph Crehan as Hank Hatch
- John Brown as Professor Keller
- Mack Williams as Arch Ward
- Selmer Jackson as Pres. Michigan Alumni Club
- Bill Brundige as Himself
- Joel Marston as Joey
- Win Hirsch as Himself
- Melvyn Arnold as Himself

The final screen of cast credits is summarized as The Men Of The Los Angeles Rams Professional Football Team, Champions Of The World 1945 and 1951, and below this title are listed Larry Brink, Tom Dahms, Dick Daugherty, Jack Dwyer, Tom Fears, Bob Gambold, Norbert Hecker, Elroy Hirsch, Dick Lane, Woodley Lewis, Leon McLaughlin, Don Paul, Duane Putnam, Volney Quinlan, Dan Towler, Norman Van Brocklin, Bob Waterfield, Stan West, Jim Winkler and Paul Younger

== See also ==
- List of American football films
