= Douglas Anderson (Wisconsin politician) =

American politician (born 1886)

Douglas Anderson was an American politician. He was a member of the Wisconsin State Assembly.

== Biography ==
Douglas Anderson was born on September 28, 1886 in Shawano, Wisconsin. He graduated from Rhinelander High School in Rhinelander, Wisconsin before attending what is now the University of Wisconsin-Madison.

Anderson was elected to the Assembly in 1912. He had previously run in 1908, losing in the Republican primary.
