= Lumberjack Conference =

Wisconsin high school athletic conference (1953-2008)

The Lumberjack Conference is a former high school athletic conference with its membership concentrated in north central Wisconsin. Originating as a football-only conference in 1946, the Lumberjack Conference competed as an all-sport conference from 1953 to 2008. All member schools belonged to the Wisconsin Interscholastic Athletic Association.

== History ==
=== 1946–1953 ===
The Lumberjack Conference was organized in 1946 as a football-only conference by a group of small- to medium-sized schools in north central Wisconsin. Original members were Medford, Mosinee, Stanley, Tomahawk and the "B" team from Wausau High School. In 1948, the Wausau "B" team left the conference and were replaced by Nekoosa High School, formerly of the Wisconsin Valley Conference. Stanley left the league in 1950 to join their primary home (the Cloverbelt Conference) for football and were replaced by Park Falls and Phillips. By 1951, conference officials began discussing sponsorship of sports other than football, contingent upon Nekoosa and Tomahawk leaving the larger Wisconsin Valley Conference. Park Falls left the Lumberjack Conference in 1952 to become an all-sport member of the Michigan-Wisconsin Conference (which they already belonged to for basketball). Nekoosa followed them out to join the South Central Conference, and the Lumberjack was down to four members for the 1952 football season. In 1953, the newly opened D.C. Everest High School in Schofield was accepted into the Lumberjack Conference as its fifth football member.

=== 1953–1976 ===
Location of Original Lumberjack Conference Members

A few months after D.C. Everest was welcomed into the Lumberjack Conference, the loop elected to sponsor additional sports, starting with basketball in the 1953–54 school year. Four of the football members (D.C. Everest, Medford, Mosinee and Phillips) would compete in the inaugural season. The fifth football member, Tomahawk, joined the Lumberjack the next year as a full member after leaving the Wisconsin Valley Conference. Park Falls joined the conference in 1955 after their exit from the Michigan-Wisconsin Conference. In 1957, D.C. Everest left the Lumberjack Conference when they were invited to join the Wisconsin Valley Conference. They were replaced by Lakeland Union High School in Minocqua (formerly of the Northern Lakes Conference) in 1958, and the conference remained a six-member circuit for fifteen years. Ashland and Hurley joined the Lumberjack in 1973, leading to the dissolution of the Michigan-Wisconsin Conference.

=== 1976–2008 ===
Location of Lumberjack Conference Members (1976-1978)

In 1976, the Lumberjack Conference added four schools: Auburndale, Colby, Nekoosa and Northland Pines in Eagle River. Auburndale and Nekoosa were former members of the Marawood Conference, Colby came from the Cloverbelt Conference, and Northland Pines was late of the Northern Lakes Conference. To accommodate the expansion of the Lumberjack to twelve member schools, the conference subdivided into North and South Divisions:

North Division	South Division
Ashland	Auburndale
Hurley	Colby
Lakeland Union	Medford
Northland Pines	Mosinee
Park Falls	Nekoosa
Phillips	Tomahawk

Location of Final Lumberjack Conference Members

This alignment would be short-lived, as four schools left the Lumberjack to join the Cloverbelt Conference in 1978: Auburndale, Colby, Mosinee and Nekoosa. Mosinee had long wanted out of the Lumberjack because of the long travel distances they experienced as members of the conference and were closer to their new rivals in the Cloverbelt. The conference went back down to a single division and continued as an eight-member conference until Hurley left in 1980 to join with former rivals in the Michigan-Wisconsin Conference to form the Gogebic Range Conference. After the 2002 season, the Lumberjack Conference ended sponsorship of football, in part due to Phillips's abrupt exit from the football roster before the season started. The remaining seven full members continued on until Ashland left the Lumberjack Conference in 2006 to join the Lake Superior Conference, a Minnesota-based conference that included nearby Superior High School as members. The Lumberjack played on with six members until 2008, when the conference was dissolved. Four of its member schools (Lakeland Union, Medford, Northland Pines and Tomahawk) were founding members of the Great Northern Conference, and the other two schools (Park Falls and Phillips) joined the Marawood Conference. Park Falls High School would close in 2009 after consolidation with Glidden to form Chequamegon High School.

== Conference membership history ==
=== Final members ===
School	Location	Affiliation	Mascot	Colors	Joined	Left	Conference Joined	Current Conference
Lakeland Union	Minocqua, WI	Public	Thunderbirds		1958	2008	Great Northern	
Medford	Medford, WI	Public	Red Raiders		1953	2008	Great Northern	
Northland Pines	Eagle River, WI	Public	Eagles		1976	2008	Great Northern	
Park Falls	Park Falls, WI	Public	Cardinals		1955	2008	Marawood	Closed in 2009 (consolidated into Chequamegon)
Phillips	Phillips, WI	Public	Loggers		1953	2008	Marawood	
Tomahawk	Tomahawk, WI	Public	Hatchets		1954	2008	Great Northern	

=== Previous members ===
School	Location	Affiliation	Mascot	Colors	Joined	Left	Conference Joined	Current Conference
Ashland	Ashland, WI	Public	Oredockers		1973	2006	Lake Superior (MSHSL)	Heart O' North
Auburndale	Auburndale, WI	Public	Apaches		1976	1978	Cloverbelt	Marawood
Colby	Colby, WI	Public	Hornets		1976	1978	Cloverbelt	
D.C. Everest	Weston, WI	Public	Evergreens		1953	1957	Wisconsin Valley	
Hurley	Hurley, WI	Public	Midgets		1973	1980	Gogebic Range (MHSAA)	Northern Lights
Mosinee	Mosinee, WI	Public	Indians		1953	1978	Cloverbelt	Great Northern
Nekoosa	Nekoosa, WI	Public	Papermakers		1976	1978	Cloverbelt	South Central

=== Associate members ===
School	Location	Affiliation	Mascot	Colors	Joined	Left	Primary Conference	Sport
Mosinee	Mosinee, WI	Public	Indians		1997	2008	Cloverbelt	Boys Hockey
Waupaca	Waupaca, WI	Public	Comets		1997	2008	East Central, Valley 8, Eastern Valley	Boys Hockey

=== Football-only members ===
School	Location	Affiliation	Mascot	Colors	Seasons	Primary Conference
Medford	Medford, WI	Public	Red Raiders		1946-1952	3-C
Mosinee	Mosinee, WI	Public	Indians		1946-1952	Marathon County, Central Wisconsin
Nekoosa	Nekoosa, WI	Public	Papermakers		1948-1951	Wisconsin Valley
Park Falls	Park Falls, WI	Public	Cardinals		1950-1951	Michigan-Wisconsin
Phillips	Phillips, WI	Public	Loggers		1950-1952	3-C
Stanley	Stanley, WI	Public	Orioles		1946-1949	Cloverbelt
Tomahawk	Tomahawk, WI	Public	Hatchets		1946-1953	Wisconsin Valley

== Membership timeline ==
=== Full members ===
North Division South Division

=== Football members ===
North Division South Division

== List of state champions ==
=== Fall sports ===
Boys Cross Country
School	Year	Division
Tomahawk	1977	Class B
Phillips	1990	Division 2
Phillips	1992	Division 2

Girls Cross Country
School	Year	Division
Tomahawk	1976	Single Division
Tomahawk	1978	Class B
Tomahawk	1979	Class B
Phillips	1985	Class B
Phillips	1986	Class B
Park Falls	1988	Class B
Park Falls	1991	Division 2
Tomahawk	2004	Division 2

Football
School	Year	Division
Lakeland Union	1983	Division 3
Ashland	1984	Division 2
Ashland	1993	Division 3

=== Winter sports ===
Boys Basketball
School	Year	Division
Park Falls	1999	Division 3

Girls Basketball
School	Year	Division
Lakeland Union	1992	Division 2
Park Falls	1995	Division 3

Curling
School	Year	Division
Medford	1968	Single Division
Medford	1970	Single Division

=== Spring sports ===
None

== List of conference champions ==
=== Boys Basketball ===
School	Quantity	Years
Medford	18	1954, 1955, 1957, 1958, 1961, 1962, 1967, 1978, 1981, 1982, 1989, 1991, 1992, 1993, 1994, 2002, 2003, 2008
Lakeland Union	15	1960, 1967, 1968, 1971, 1972, 1978, 1988, 1990, 1995, 1997, 1998, 2004, 2005, 2006, 2007
Park Falls	9	1959, 1960, 1972, 1982, 1983, 1984, 1999, 2000, 2001
Ashland	8	1974, 1975, 1977, 1978, 1979, 1985, 1988, 1989
Tomahawk	6	1963, 1964, 1969, 1970, 1976, 1980
Mosinee	5	1956, 1964, 1965, 1966, 1973
Phillips	4	1986, 1987, 1992, 1996
Auburndale	1	1977
Colby	0	
D.C. Everest	0	
Hurley	0	
Nekoosa	0	
Northland Pines	0	

=== Girls Basketball ===
School	Quantity	Years
Ashland	8	1983, 1984, 1985, 1986, 1987, 1988, 1989, 1990
Medford	8	1977, 1987, 1994, 1998, 1999, 2002, 2003, 2005
Lakeland Union	6	1991, 1992, 1993, 2001, 2004, 2006
Northland Pines	6	1978, 1979, 1980, 1981, 1986, 1987
Park Falls	5	1994, 1995, 1996, 2007, 2008
Tomahawk	3	1977, 1978, 2000
Phillips	1	1997
Auburndale	0	
Colby	0	
Hurley	0	
Mosinee	0	
Nekoosa	0	
Champions from 1982 unknown

=== Football ===
School	Quantity	Years
Medford	20	1946, 1947, 1951, 1952, 1953, 1954, 1957, 1969, 1977, 1979, 1980, 1985, 1988, 1990, 1991, 1992, 1997, 1999, 2000, 2001
Mosinee	16	1948, 1955, 1958, 1960, 1961, 1962, 1964, 1965, 1967, 1970, 1971, 1972, 1973, 1974, 1976, 1977
Ashland	12	1974, 1975, 1976, 1978, 1979, 1982, 1984, 1987, 1993, 1994, 1995, 1998
Lakeland Union	8	1963, 1966, 1977, 1979, 1983, 1987, 1996, 2002
D.C. Everest	2	1955, 1956
Nekoosa	2	1948, 1949
Northland Pines	2	1981, 1986
Park Falls	2	1950, 1959
Tomahawk	2	1966, 1989
Colby	1	1977
Phillips	1	1968
Auburndale	0	
Hurley	0	
Stanley	0	
Wausau "B"	0	

=== Boys Hockey ===
School	Quantity	Years
Northland Pines	10	1992, 1993, 1994, 1995, 1996, 1999, 2003, 2004, 2005, 2006
Mosinee	4	1998, 2002, 2007, 2008
Ashland	1	1997
Lakeland Union	1	2001
Waupaca	1	2000
Medford	0	
Park Falls	0	
Tomahawk	0	
