= James A. Drake (ecologist) =

American ecologist (born 1954)

- Born: 1954 (age 70–71); Wisconsin, U.S.
- Occupation: Community ecologist
- Known for: Community Ecology Assembly Models
- Notable work: Biological Invasions

James A. Drake (born 1954) is an American ecologist.

== Early life and education ==
Drake was born on August 20, 1954. He went to Wausau West High School and then to the University of Wisconsin in Madison and graduated with a degree in science education. He later graduated from Purdue in 1985 and became an Andrew Mellon Fellow at Stanford working on Biological Invasions with Harold Mooney. In 1986, he began teaching at The University of Tennessee as an assistant professor in zoology and the ecology graduate program. He was a founding member of their Department of Ecology and Evolutionary Biology.

== Career ==
Drake focused on community assembly models and the structure of ecological communities. He helped organize The International Program of the Scientific Committee on Problems with the Environment. This work led to the formation of the scientific study of invasion biology. He was the editor-in-chief of the journal Biological Invasions from 2003 to 2008 and edited two major texts from some of the earliest works regarding community ecology at the time Ecology of Biological Invasions of Hawaii and North America (1986) and Biological Invasions: A Global Perspective (1989). His work is considered as influential work regarding Community Ecology. Some of his students later determined the simultaneous convergence and divergence at different levels of community assembly. Some of his work included sequential and spatial constraints to illustrate the principles of population ecology. His theoretical constructs were later used to describe microbial ecological communities. His most influential work involves emerging complex systems, food webs, and biological invasions.

== Works ==
=== Books ===
- Emergence in Ecological Systems (2006). From Energetics to Ecosystems: The Dynamics and Structure of Ecological Systems.
- An Experimentally-Derived Map of Community Assembly Space (2002)
- Drake, James A., eds. Biological Invasions: A Global Perspective. Chichester: Published on behalf of the Scientific Committee on Problems of the Environment (SCOPE) of the International Council of Scientific Unions (ICSU) by Wiley, 1989. ISBN 9780471920854
- Drake, James A., and Michael L. McKinney., eds. Biodiversity Dynamics: Turnover of Populations, Taxa, and Communities. 2001. doi:10.7312/mcki10414
- Drake, James A. Handbook of Alien Species in Europe. Dordrecht: Springer Netherlands, 2009. ISBN 9781402082801
- Drake, James A., and Fred Kraus. Alien Reptiles and Amphibians: A Scientific Compendium and Analysis. Dordrecht: Springer Netherlands, 2009. doi:10.1007/978-1-4020-8946-6 ISBN 9781402089466
- Mooney, Harold A., and James A. Drake., eds. Ecology of biological invasions of North America and Hawaii. New York: Springer-Verlag, 1986 ISBN 978-1-4612-4988-7 (Cited 872 times, according to Google Scholar)

=== Most-cited Peer-reviewed journal articles ===
- Drake JA. Community-assembly mechanics and the structure of an experimental species ensemble. The American Naturalist. 1991 Jan 1;137(1):1-26. (Cited 611 times, according to Google Scholar.)
- Drake JA. The mechanics of community assembly and succession. Journal of Theoretical Biology. 1990 Nov 21;147(2):213-33. (Cited 402 times, according to Google Scholar.)
- Drake JA. Communities as assembled structures: do rules govern pattern?. Trends in Ecology & Evolution. 1990 May 1;5(5):159-64.(Cited 387 times, according to Google Scholar.)
- Samuels CL, Drake JA. Divergent perspectives on community convergence. Trends in Ecology & Evolution. 1997 Nov 1;12(11):427-32. (Cited 214 times, according to Google Scholar.)
- Drake JA, Huxel GR, Hewitt CL. Microcosms as models for generating and testing community theory. Ecology. 1996 Apr 1;77(3):670-7. (Cited 180 times, according to Google Scholar.)
- Cadotte MW, Mai DV, Jantz S, Collins MD, Keele M, Drake JA. On testing the competition-colonization trade-off in a multispecies assemblage. The American Naturalist. 2006 Nov;168(5):704-9. (Cited 160 times, according to Google Scholar.)
- Drake JA, Flum TE, Witteman GJ, Voskuil T, Hoylman AM, Creson C, Kenny DA, Huxel GR, Larue CS, Duncan JR. The construction and assembly of an ecological landscape. Journal of Animal Ecology. 1993 Jan 1:117-30. (Cited 157 times, according to Google Scholar.)
