= Tom Dahms =

American football player and coach (1927–1988)

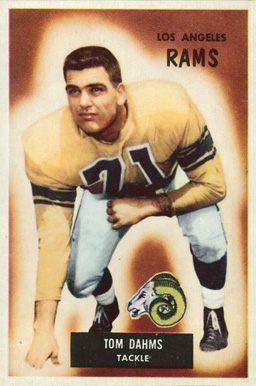
- Dahms on a 1955 Bowman football card

No. 71 78, 70
- Position: Offensive tackle

Personal information
- Born: April 19, 1927; San Diego, California, U.S.
- Died: November 30, 1988 (aged 61); Orange County, California, U.S.
- Listed height: 6 ft 5 in (1.96 m)
- Listed weight: 242 lb (110 kg)

Career information
- High school: San Diego
- College: San Diego State

Career history

Playing
- Los Angeles Rams (1951–1954); Green Bay Packers (1955); Chicago Cardinals (1956); San Francisco 49ers (1957)

Coaching
- Dallas Cowboys (1960–1962) (DL); Oakland Raiders (1963–1978) (DL)

Awards and highlights
- NFL champion (1951); Super Bowl champion (XI)

Career statistics
- Games played: 63
- Stats at Pro Football Reference

Thomas Gordon Dahms (April 19, 1927 – November 30, 1988) was an American professional football player and coach. He played in the National Football League (NFL) as an offensive tackle for seven seasons with the Los Angeles Rams, Green Bay Packers, Chicago Cardinals, and San Francisco 49ers. After his playing career, he served as an assistant coach in the NFL with the Dallas Cowboys and the Oakland Raiders. He played college football at San Diego State College.

== Early life ==
Dahms attended San Diego High School, before moving on to San Diego State College and playing tackle. In 1949, he received All-American and Little-All Coast honors.

In 1991, he was inducted into the San Diego State University Athletics Hall of Fame.

== Professional career ==
In 1951, he signed with the Los Angeles Rams, where he played offensive tackle and helped the team win an NFL Championship.

== Coaching career ==
Dahms was a line coach at the San Diego Naval Training Center. In 1958, he was the athletic director at San Diego Junior High. After one year he took over as the line coach at the University of Virginia in 1959.

In 1960, he joined the Dallas Cowboys for their inaugural season, becoming the first defensive line coach in franchise history. After two years in Dallas, he accepted the same position with the Oakland Raiders under head coach Al Davis in 1963, remaining with the team until 1978. He was an assistant with the semipro football team Yuba City Cougars. In 1986, he was hired as the head coach at Mountain Empire High School.

== Personal life ==
Dahms appeared in "Crazylegs" a film about Elroy Hirsch.
