= Wisconsin Valley Conference =

Wisconsin high school athletic conference

The Wisconsin Valley Conference is a high school athletic conference composed of the largest public schools in north central Wisconsin. Founded in 1920, it is one of Wisconsin's oldest athletic conferences, and all members belong to the Wisconsin Interscholastic Athletic Association.

== History ==
=== 1921-1946 ===
Location of Original Wisconsin Valley Conference Members

The Wisconsin Valley Conference was founded in 1920 by seven medium- to large-enrollment high schools in north central Wisconsin: Antigo, Marshfield, Merrill, Rhinelander, Stevens Point, Wausau and Wisconsin Rapids Lincoln. After sponsoring a full football schedule for the first two seasons, basketball played their first full schedule for the 1921-1922 school year. The early years of the Wisconsin Valley Conference saw many smaller schools join for short periods of time, especially for basketball. In 1922, Edgar, Medford and Nekoosa joined and Tomahawk joined the conference for that sport, with Tomahawk also joining the conference's football roster. Edgar left the following year, and in 1924, Shawano and Wautoma joined the WVC. Shawano also became members in football, along with basketball members Medford, for the 1924 season. Nekoosa became the WVC's eleventh football playing member when it joined the group for the 1925 season. In 1926, Shawano and Wautoma left the Wisconsin Valley Conference, and after Medford's exit in 1928, membership stayed stable at nine schools for just over two decades.

=== 1946-1956 ===
Over time, tensions grew between the larger and smaller schools in the conference, with the smaller schools seeking other options outside the WVC. Tomahawk was the first of these schools to take action: first becoming charter members of the football-only Lumberjack Conference in 1946, then joining as full members in 1954 after the league began to sponsor other sports the year prior. Nekoosa followed Tomahawk out of the WVC, joining the Lumberjack for football in 1948, then becoming full members of the newly reformed South Central Conference in 1952. After the loss of Tomahawk as full members in 1954, the Wisconsin Valley Conference faced an even greater challenge the next year. Citing competitive imbalance in football, the four smallest schools in the conference (Antigo, Marshfield, Merrill and Rhinelander) left the Wisconsin Valley to start a new conference called the Northern Wisconsin Conference. These four schools continued to schedule WVC members Stevens Point and Wisconsin Rapids as non-conference opponents, but not Wausau, who had been the dominant force in football for decades. Wausau claimed one last Wisconsin Valley Conference title for football before they joined the new Big Rivers Conference and the four schools who left the WVC rejoined in 1956.

=== 1956-2008 ===
The revamped Wisconsin Valley Conference began play in 1956 with six schools (Antigo, Marshfield, Merrill, Rhinelander, Stevens Point and Wisconsin Rapids Lincoln). A seventh school was added to the Wisconsin Valley in 1957 when former Lumberjack Conference members D.C. Everest High School in Schofield joined the conference. In 1970, Shawano became the eighth school to join the conference after leaving the disbanded Mid-Eastern Conference. Wausau East was invited to rejoin the Wisconsin Valley Conference from the Big Rivers in 1973, along with newcomer Wausau West to bring conference membership to ten schools. Shawano left the Wisconsin Valley Conference to join the Bay Conference in 1979, and the membership group would remain at nine schools for nearly thirty years.

=== 2008-present ===
In 2008, two of the smaller schools in the conference left to become member of the new Great Northern Conference: Antigo and Merrill. Rhinelander left to compete as an independent in football for the 2009 season before leaving to join the Great Northern Conference as full members in 2010. Merrill, who left the WVC two years earlier to become GNC members, rejoined the WVC for all sports but football as Rhinelander's replacement. After two seasons of difficulties scheduling non-conference opponents, the six football-playing members of the Wisconsin Valley Conference joined forces with the ten-member Fox Valley Association to form the Valley Football Association, which began play in 2011. This arrangement lasted until the WIAA's 2024-2025 competition cycle, when the WVC was reinstated for football and entered into a scheduling partnership with the similarly sized Big Rivers Conference. Five full members of the conference (D.C. Everest, Marshfield, Stevens Point, Wausau West and Wisconsin Rapids) were joined by Big Rivers members Eau Claire Memorial and Eau Claire North in a seven-member roster. This arrangement is set to remain in place through at least the 2026-2027 football competition cycle. In 2025, Merrill returned to the Great Northern Conference after fifteen years of Wisconsin Valley membership, leaving the conference with six full member schools.

== List of member schools ==
=== Current full members ===
School	Location	Affiliation	Enrollment	Mascot	Colors	Joined
D.C. Everest	Weston, WI	Public	1,739	Evergreens		1957
Marshfield	Marshfield, WI	Public	1,180	Tigers		1921, (Note: Left the Wisconsin Valley Conference in 1955, returned in 1956) 1956
Stevens Point	Stevens Point, WI	Public	2,142	Panthers		1921
Wausau East	Wausau, WI	Public	945	Lumberjacks		1921, 1973
Wausau West	Wausau, WI	Public	1,519	Warriors		1973
Wisconsin Rapids	Wisconsin Rapids, WI	Public	1,348	Red Raiders		1921

=== Current associate members ===
School	Location	Affiliation	Mascot	Colors	Primary Conference	Sport(s)
Black River Falls	Black River Falls, WI	Public	Tigers		Coulee	Girls Hockey (Note: Co-operative with Granton, Melrose-Mindoro, Neillsville, Sparta, Tomah and Whitehall)
Eau Claire Memorial	Eau Claire, WI	Public	Old Abes		Big Rivers	Football
Eau Claire North	Eau Claire, WI	Public	Huskies		Big Rivers	Football
Medford	Medford, WI	Public	Raiders		Great Northern	Girls Hockey (Note: Co-operative with Abbotsford, Edgar and Rib Lake)
Northland Pines	Eagle River, WI	Public	Eagles		Great Northern	Girls Hockey (Note: Co-operative with Antigo, Bessemer (MI), Hurley, Ironwood (MI), Lakeland Union, Norway (MI), Rhinelander, Three Lakes, Wabeno and Wakefield-Marenisco (MI))
Rhinelander	Rhinelander, WI	Public	Hodags		Great Northern	Girls Golf

=== Current co-operative members ===
Team	Colors	Host School	Co-operative Members	Sport(s)
Central Wisconsin Storm		D.C. Everest	Merrill, Mosinee, Stratford, Wausau East, Wausau West	Girls Hockey
Wisconsin Valley Union Eagles		Stevens Point	Amherst, Assumption, Auburndale, Columbus Catholic, Marshfield, Pacelli, Spencer, Waupaca, Wisconsin Rapids	Girls Hockey

=== Former full members ===
School	Location	Affiliation	Mascot	Colors	Joined	Left	Conference Joined	Current Conference
Antigo	Antigo, WI	Public	Red Robins		1921, 1956	1955, 2008	Northern Wisconsin, Great Northern	Great Northern
Edgar	Edgar, WI	Public	Wildcats		1922	1923	Independent	Marawood
Medford	Medford, WI	Public	Raiders		1922	1928	3-C	Great Northern
Merrill	Merrill, WI	Public	Blue Jays		1921, 1956, 2010	1955, 2008, 2025	Northern Wisconsin, Great Northern	Great Northern
Nekoosa	Nekoosa, WI	Public	Papermakers		1922	1952	South Central	
Shawano	Shawano, WI	Public	Hawks		1924, 1970	1926, 1979	Independent, Bay	Bay
Rhinelander	Rhinelander, WI	Public	Hodags		1921, 1956	1955, 2010	Northern Wisconsin, Great Northern	Great Northern
Tomahawk	Tomahawk, WI	Public	Hatchets		1922	1954	Lumberjack	Great Northern
Wautoma	Wautoma, WI	Public	Hornets		1924	1926	7-C	South Central

== Membership map ==
Wisconsin Valley Conference
Location of Wisconsin Valley Conference full members:
1 D.C. Everest
2 Marshfield
3 Stevens Point
4 Wausau East
5 Wausau West
6 Wisconsin Rapids

== Sponsored sports ==
	Baseball	Boys Basketball	Girls Basketball	Boys Cross Country	Girls Cross Country	Football	Boys Golf	Girls Golf	Boys Hockey	Girls Hockey	Boys Soccer	Girls Soccer	Softball	Boys Swim & Dive	Girls Swim & Dive	Boys Tennis	Girls Tennis	Boys Track & Field	Girls Track & Field	Girls Volleyball	Boys Wrestling	Girls Wrestling
D.C. Everest	●	●	●	●	●	●	●	●	●	● (Note: Central Wisconsin Storm co-operative)	●	●	●	●	●	●	●	●	●	●	●	●
Marshfield	●	●	●	●	●	●	●	●	● (Note: Co-operative with Columbus Catholic)		●	●	●	●	●	●	●	●	●	●	●	●
Stevens Point	●	●	●	●	●	●	●	●	●	● (Note: Wisconsin Valley Union Eagles co-operative)	●	●	●	●	●	●	●	●	●	●	●	●
Wausau East	●	●	●	●	●		●	● (Note: Co-operative with Wausau West)			●	●	●	●	●	●	●	●	●	●	●	●
Wausau West	●	●	●	●	●	●	●		●		●	●	●		●	●	●	●	●	●	●	●
Wisconsin Rapids	●	●	●	●	●	●	●	●	●		●	●	●	●	●	●	●	●	●	●	●	●

== List of state champions ==
=== Fall sports ===
Boys Cross Country
School	Year	Division
Antigo	1965	Large Schools
Rhinelander	1966	Medium Schools
Stevens Point	1980	Class A
Stevens Point	1981	Class A
Stevens Point	1983	Class A
Stevens Point	1985	Class A
Rhinelander	1987	Class A
Stevens Point	1994	Division 1
Stevens Point	1997	Division 1
Stevens Point	1998	Division 1
Stevens Point	2003	Division 1
Stevens Point	2008	Division 1
Stevens Point	2013	Division 1
Stevens Point	2021-22	Alternate Season
Stevens Point	2022	Division 1
Stevens Point	2023	Division 1

Girls Cross Country
School	Year	Division
Stevens Point	1987	Class A
Stevens Point	2002	Division 1
Stevens Point	2003	Division 1
Wausau East	2009	Division 1
Wausau East	2010	Division 1

Football
School	Year	Division
Antigo	1976	Division 1
Antigo	1978	Division 1
D.C. Everest	1981	Division 1
Antigo	1982	Division 1
D.C. Everest	1983	Division 1
D.C. Everest	1989	Division 1
Marshfield	1997	Division 1
D.C. Everest	1998	Division 1
Marshfield	2001	Division 1
Marshfield	2002	Division 1

Girls Golf
School	Year	Division
Wisconsin Rapids	2000	Single Division

Boys Volleyball
School	Year	Division
Antigo	1967	Single Division
Antigo	1968	Single Division

Girls Volleyball
School	Year	Division
Shawano	1973	Single Division
Merrill	1981	Class A

=== Winter sports ===
Boys Basketball
School	Year	Division
Stevens Point	1926	Single Division
Wausau	1929	Single Division
Wausau	1938	Class A
Rhinelander	1939	Class A
Wisconsin Rapids	1951	Single Division
Stevens Point	1954	Single Division
Stevens Point	1994	Division 1
Stevens Point	2015	Division 1
Stevens Point	2016	Division 1
Stevens Point	2017	Division 1

Girls Basketball
School	Year	Division
Stevens Point	1980	Class A
D.C. Everest	1986	Class A

Gymnastics
School	Year	Division
Antigo	2008	Division 2

Boys Hockey
School	Year	Division
Antigo	1993	Single Division
Stevens Point	2002	Single Division
Wausau West	2011	Single Division

Girls Hockey
School	Year	Division
Central Wisconsin Storm	2008	Single Division
Central Wisconsin Storm	2012	Single Division
Central Wisconsin Storm	2017	Single Division
Central Wisconsin Storm	2022	Single Division
Central Wisconsin Storm	2024	Single Division

Skiing
School	Year	Division
Rhinelander	1963	Single Division
Rhinelander	1965	Single Division
Rhinelander	1967	Single Division

Boys Wrestling
School	Year	Division
Stevens Point	1949	Single Division
Merrill	1970	Single Division
Wisconsin Rapids	1974	Single Division
D.C. Everest	1978	Single Division
Wisconsin Rapids	1979	Single Division
Wisconsin Rapids	1981	Class A
D.C. Everest	1982	Class A
Antigo	1983	Class A
Wisconsin Rapids	1985	Class A
D.C. Everest	1986	Class A
Wisconsin Rapids	1989	Class A
Merrill	1992	Division 1
Merrill	1993	Division 1
Wisconsin Rapids	1995	Division 1
Wisconsin Rapids	1996	Division 1
Wisconsin Rapids	1997	Division 1
Wisconsin Rapids	1998	Division 1
Wisconsin Rapids	1999	Division 1
Wisconsin Rapids	2000	Division 1
Wisconsin Rapids	2001	Division 1
Wisconsin Rapids	2003	Division 1
Wisconsin Rapids	2004	Division 1
Wisconsin Rapids	2005	Division 1
Wisconsin Rapids	2006	Division 1
Wisconsin Rapids	2007	Division 1
Wausau West	2008	Division 1
Wisconsin Rapids	2009	Division 1
Wisconsin Rapids	2010	Division 1
Wisconsin Rapids	2011	Division 1
Wisconsin Rapids	2012	Division 1
Wausau West	2013	Division 1

=== Spring sports ===
Baseball
School	Year	Division
Stevens Point	1979	Class A
Stevens Point	1989	Class A
Stevens Point	1994	Division 1

Boys Golf
School	Year	Division
Merrill	1964	Single Division
Rhinelander	1969	Single Division
Stevens Point	1981	Single Division
Stevens Point	1983	Single Division

Girls Soccer
School	Year	Division
D.C. Everest	2015	Division 1

Softball
School	Year	Division
Stevens Point	1986	Class A
Marshfield	1991	Division 1
Marshfield	1997	Division 1
Stevens Point	2001	Division 1
Stevens Point	2002	Division 1
Stevens Point	2003	Division 1
Stevens Point	2004	Division 1
Stevens Point	2008	Division 1
Stevens Point	2009	Division 1
Stevens Point	2011	Division 1
Stevens Point	2016	Division 1

Boys Track & Field
School	Year	Division
Stevens Point	1955	Class A
D.C. Everest	1994	Division 1
D.C. Everest	1996	Division 1
Stevens Point	2023	Division 1

Girls Track & Field
School	Year	Division
D.C. Everest	1991	Division 1
Wausau West	1995	Division 1
D.C. Everest	1999	Division 1
D.C. Everest	2021	Division 1

== List of conference champions ==
=== Boys Basketball ===
School	Quantity	Years
Stevens Point	28	1924, 1927, 1931, 1934, 1944, 1945, 1946, 1947, 1950, 1952, 1954, 1958, 1965, 1982, 1984, 1985, 1988, 1994, 2000, 2008, 2013, 2014, 2015, 2016, 2017, 2018, 2021, 2026
Rhinelander	21	1936, 1937, 1938, 1939, 1940, 1942, 1948, 1959, 1960, 1964, 1966, 1969, 1971, 1975, 1976, 1989, 1990, 1996, 1998, 1999, 2004
Wisconsin Rapids	19	1946, 1948, 1949, 1951, 1952, 1953, 1954, 1957, 1961, 1967, 1978, 1979, 1983, 1986, 1987, 1991, 1995, 2005, 2011
(Wausau) East	18	1929, 1930, 1932, 1933, 1934, 1941, 1942, 1943, 1955, 1977, 1980, 1981, 1990, 2001, 2002, 2003, 2006, 2007
Antigo	14	1922, 1923, 1935, 1942, 1943, 1956, 1962, 1963, 1972, 1973, 1974, 1979, 1997, 1998
D.C. Everest	10	1967, 1968, 1969, 1970, 1978, 1998, 2012, 2020, 2021, 2026
Marshfield	8	1992, 2010, 2019, 2022, 2023, 2024, 2025, 2026
Wausau West	5	1992, 1993, 1996, 2009, 2010
Shawano	3	1925, 1926, 1973
Medford	1	1924
Merrill	1	2019
Nekoosa	1	1929
Tomahawk	1	1928
Edgar	0	
Wautoma	0	

=== Girls Basketball ===
School	Quantity	Years
D.C. Everest	18	1976, 1984, 1986, 1988, 1990, 1991, 1992, 1993, 1994, 1995, 1997, 1998, 2002, 2008, 2014, 2015, 2017, 2018
Stevens Point	14	1980, 1985, 1998, 1999, 2001, 2006, 2012, 2013, 2018, 2019, 2023, 2024, 2025, 2026
Marshfield	12	1976, 1977, 2003, 2004, 2005, 2008, 2009, 2010, 2011, 2016, 2020, 2024
Merrill	10	1983, 1984, 1985, 1987, 1989, 1995, 1996, 2000, 2002, 2007
Wausau West	4	1981, 2013, 2021, 2022
Wausau East	3	1977, 1978, 1979
Antigo	2	1982, 2007
Rhinelander	0	
Shawano	0	
Wisconsin Rapids	0	

=== Football ===
School	Quantity	Years
D.C. Everest	25	1957, 1958, 1961, 1962, 1966, 1967, 1970, 1971, 1981, 1983, 1984, 1989, 1991, 1993, 1995, 1996, 1997, 1998, 2000, 2001, 2003, 2004, 2008, 2024, 2025
Antigo	22	1920, 1926, 1928, 1929, 1959, 1963, 1964, 1967, 1968, 1969, 1972, 1973, 1974, 1975, 1976, 1978, 1982, 1985, 1986, 1987, 1988, 1992
Stevens Point	21	1922, 1925, 1931, 1932, 1934, 1935, 1949, 1951, 1954, 1956, 1960, 1977, 1988, 1990, 1993, 2005, 2006, 2007, 2009, 2010, 2026
(Wausau) East	20	1922, 1926, 1930, 1933, 1937, 1939, 1940, 1941, 1942, 1943, 1944, 1945, 1946, 1947, 1948, 1950, 1952, 1953, 1954, 1955
Wisconsin Rapids	10	1923, 1936, 1946, 1965, 1967, 1980, 1988, 1990, 1991, 1994
Marshfield	6	1927, 1930, 1932, 1999, 2001, 2002
Rhinelander	5	1934, 1938, 1964, 1974, 1989
Merrill	4	1921, 1954, 1977, 1979
Shawano	1	1924
Wausau West	1	1993
Eau Claire Memorial	0	
Eau Claire North	0	
Medford	0	
Nekoosa	0	
Tomahawk	0	

=== Boys Hockey ===
School	Quantity	Years
Stevens Point	17	1992, 1994, 1997, 1998, 2000, 2002, 2005, 2006, 2013, 2017, 2018, 2021, 2022, 2023, 2024, 2025, 2026
Wausau West	14	1999, 2001, 2008, 2009, 2010, 2011, 2012, 2014, 2016, 2017, 2018, 2019, 2020, 2026
Wisconsin Rapids	6	2002, 2003, 2004, 2005, 2014, 2015
Antigo	3	1993, 1995, 1996
D.C. Everest	0	
EM United	0	
Marshfield	0	
Merrill	0	
Rhinelander	0	
Wausau East	0	
