= Win Brockmeyer =

American football player and coach (1907–1980)

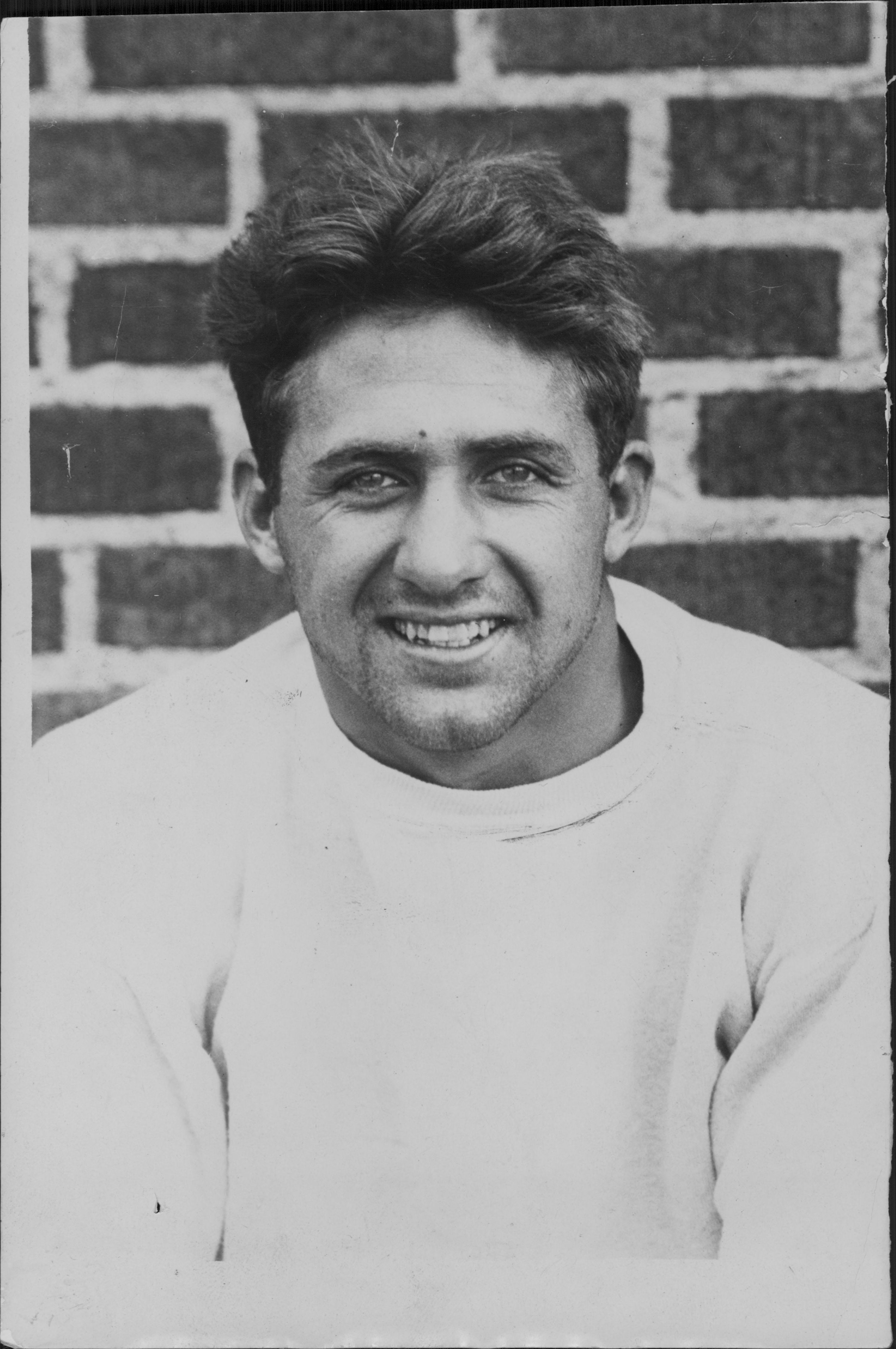
- Brockmeyer in 1929

Biographical details
- Born: September 16, 1907; Mankato, Minnesota, US
- Died: March 14, 1980 (aged 72); Florida, US

Playing career
- 1928: Minnesota
- Position: Halfback

Coaching career (HC unless noted)
- 1937–1970: Wausau HS (WI)

Head coaching record
- Overall: 265–43–14

Winfred Otto Brockmeyer (September 16, 1907 – March 14, 1980) was an American football coach from Mankato, Minnesota.

== Early life ==
Brockmeyer was born in Mankato, Minnesota on September 16, 1907, the son of Otto and Margaret Brockmeyer. He attended the University of Minnesota where he played football under coaches Doc Spears and Fritz Crisler. He played halfback for the Gophers in a backfield that included Bronko Nagurski. His best college day came in 1928, when he gained 166 yards rushing and scored all the points in the Gophers' upset of Purdue. He ran 46 yards for one touchdown and passed for two more and Minnesota won 18-0.

== Career ==
After his graduation from Minnesota, he played semi-pro ball with the Minnesota All-Stars. His greatest success was in coaching, and he gave up his player role to concentrate on coaching.

He started at Fergus Falls, Minnesota from 1931 to 1933, and at Faribault, Minnesota from 1933 to 1937. In 1937, he came to Wausau. In his 40 years of coaching high school football, his teams had a combined record of 265–43–14. His record at Wausau High was 230–33–9. Over those 34 seasons, his team either won outright or shared in 26 conference championships. "For years he coached basketball, among other sports, and his basketball teams compiled a record of 128 wins against 88 losses, and won the state championship in his first year with the team."

Wausau High's record in the early to mid-1940s was unequaled for many years. In 1939, Wausau won seven games and lost one, the last game they would lose for years. In 1940, they went undefeated and outscored their opponents 299 to 12, without giving up a single point until the final quarter of the final game of the year. In 1941, they went undefeated again, and then again in 1943 and 1945. They finally lost a game in 1946, their 46-game winning streak setting a Wisconsin high school record that lasted until 1987 when it was broken by Manitowoc Lincoln (48 straight games; 1984-1987) and later by Waunakee (48 games; 2009-2012). Brockmeyer's winning percentage is .845, making him one of the winningest football coaches in Wisconsin history.

Both Football Hall of Famers Elroy Hirsch and Jim Otto played for him at Wausau High School. Brockmeyer is the only man ever to have coached two members of the Pro Football Hall of Fame in high school. He also coached another Hall of Fame member, Bruce Smith the only man to win the Heisman Trophy (1941) from the University of Minnesota.

As coach at Wausau High School from 1937 to 1970, Brockmeyer had a 230-33-9 record. He was undefeated in 13 seasons. His teams won 26 conference titles. In the 1940s, he had a 72-2-4 record that included a 46-game winning streak. A scholarship was later inaugurated in his honor.

== Popular culture ==
In the 1954 movie Crazylegs, the story of Elroy Hirsch, Brockmeyer was played by Lloyd Nolan. It was the only Hollywood movie to ever premiere in Wausau.

== Recognition ==
- Wisconsin Football Coaches Hall of Fame (1980)
- National Federation of State High School Associations (1984).
- National High School Athletic Coaches Association Hall of Fame (2004)

== Personal life ==
He married Helen Mae Date on Thanksgiving Day 1932. They raised three children.

On March 14, 1980, Brockmeyer, 72, was on a golf outing in Florida with UW Athletic Director Elroy Hirsch and other members of the UW athletic staff when he was struck by an apparent heart attack and died. He and his wife were cremated and had their ashes scattered within Wausau.
