= Tomahawk School District =

School district in Wisconsin, United States

The Tomahawk School District serves the city of Tomahawk, Wisconsin. The present superintendent is Terry Reynolds .

== History ==
The first school (a kindergarten) opened in Tomahawk in 1888, while the first high school, Whittier High School, did not open until 1894. In 2000 the Tomahawk society members converted the first Tomahawk School into a museum holding many different historic items from the town's history.

== Schools ==
Tomahawk School District comprises three public schools:

- Tomahawk Elementary School.
- Tomahawk Middle School
- Tomahawk High School

== Spirit ==
All schools in the district compete athletically under the name "The Tomahawk Hatchets". The school colors are blue and gold.
