= Medford Area Senior High School =

Coordinates: 45°08′30.1″N 90°21′54.0″W

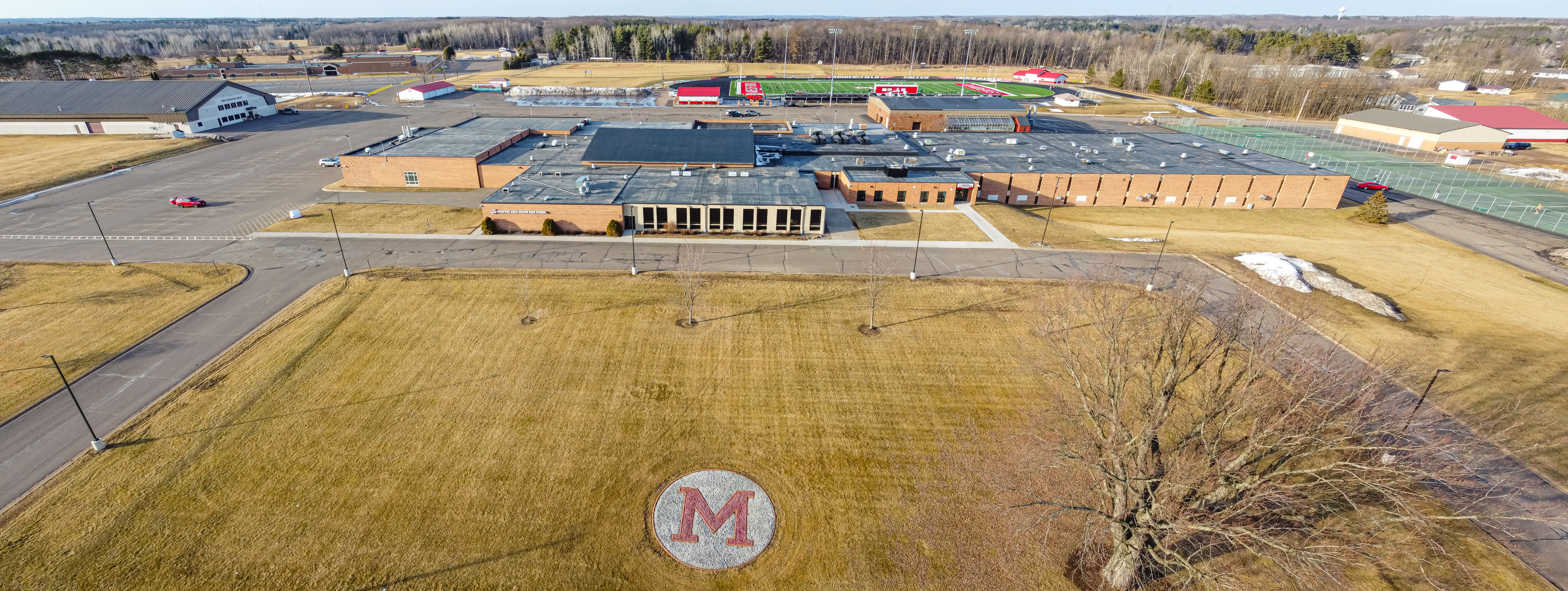

Location
- 1015 West Broadway Avenue; Medford, WI

Information
- School type: Public Secondary
- Motto: "Ordinary is a given. Greatness is achieved."
- Opened: 1976
- School district: Medford Area
- Principal: Jill Lybert
- Staff: 53.57 (FTE)
- Grades: 9-12
- Enrollment: 685 (2023-2024)
- Student to teacher ratio: 12.79
- Colors: Red & White
- Fight song: Washington & Lee Swing
- Athletics conference: WIAA Great Northern Conference
- Mascot: Big Red
- Team name: Raiders
- Website: MASH Website

Medford Area Senior High School (known as MASH) is a public secondary school located in Medford, Wisconsin. MASH is the only high school in the Medford Area Public School District.

== History ==
The current high school building was built in 1968. The high school formerly occupied the old middle school building on Clark Street. The current building includes a gymnasium known locally as "Raider Hall", an auditorium known locally as the "Red and White Theatre", and a swimming pool known as "Raider Pool".

== Athletics ==
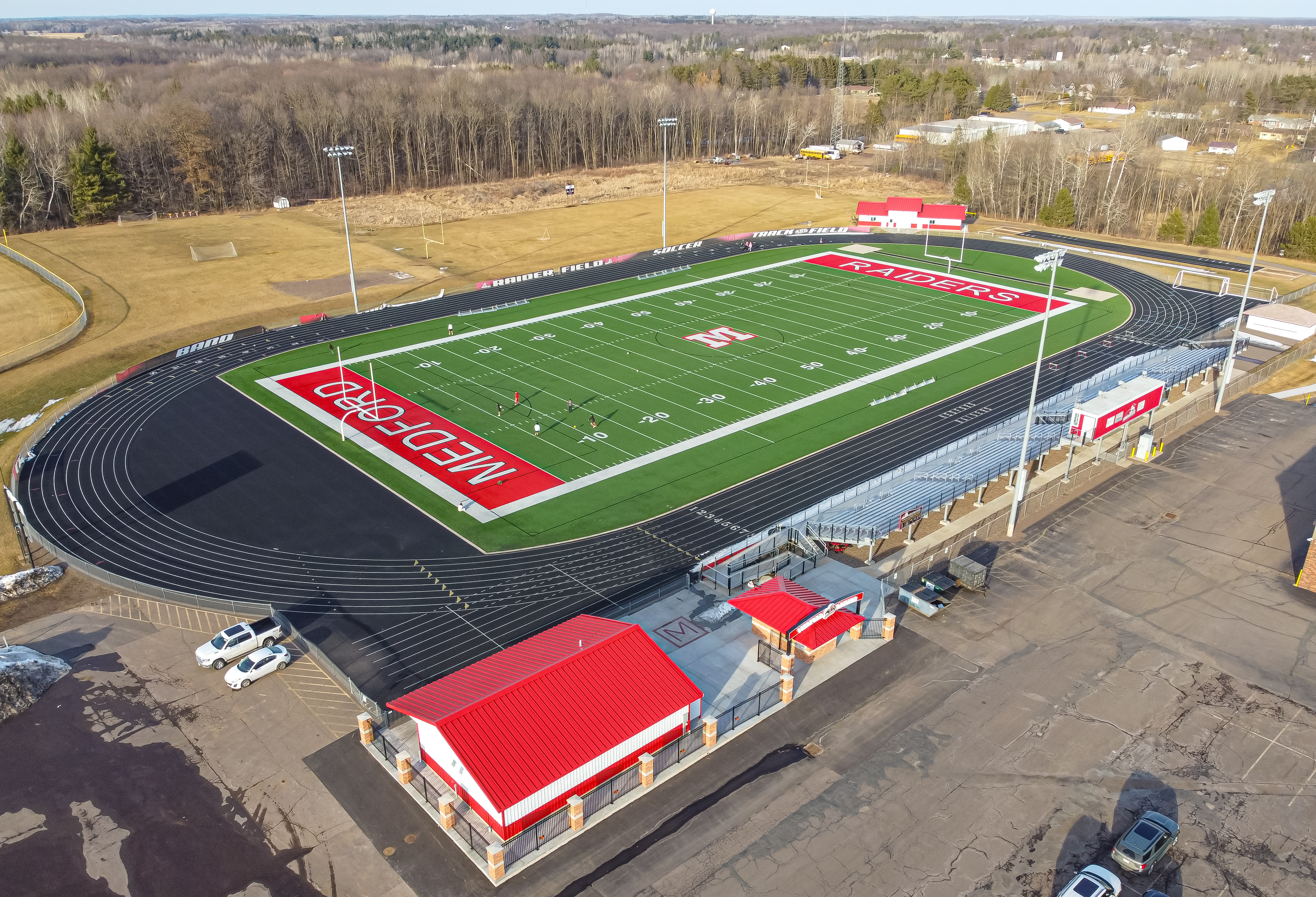
Medford football field

The following sports are currently offered at MASH:

- Baseball
- Boys Basketball
- Girls Basketball
- Boys Soccer
- Girls Soccer
- Cross-Country
- Curling
- Football
- Golf
- Gymnastics
- Boys Hockey
- Girls Hockey
- Softball
- Swimming
- Tennis
- Track
- Volleyball
- Wrestling

=== Athletic conference affiliation history ===
- Wisconsin Valley Conference (1922-1928)
- 3-C Conference (1930-1955)
- Lumberjack Conference (1955-2008)
- Great Northern Conference (2008–present)
