= Rhinelander High School =

Coordinates: 45°38′54″N 89°24′00″W

- Rhinelander High School flag

Location
- 665 Coolidge Avenue; Rhinelander, Oneida, Wisconsin 54501; United States

Information
- School type: Public, High school
- Motto: Committed to Excellence
- Founded: 1889
- School district: School District of Rhinelander
- Superintendent: Eric Burke
- Principal: Shane Dornfeld
- Teaching staff: 47.05 (FTE)
- Grades: 9–12
- Enrollment: 756 (2023–2024)
- Student to teacher ratio: 16.07
- Color
- Athletics: Football, cross country, soccer, tennis, volleyball, basketball, gymnastics, hockey, swimming, wrestling, Alpine skiing, Nordic skiing, baseball, softball, golf, track and field
- Athletics conference: Great Northern Conference
- Mascot: Hodag
- Rival: Lakeland Thunderbirds, Antigo Red Robins
- Website: www.rhinelander.k12.wi.us/schools/high/

Rhinelander High School (RHS) is a high school in Rhinelander, Oneida County, Wisconsin, United States.

== History ==
The first Rhinelander High School was built in 1889. It was named Rhinelander Union High School (RUHS) and the building was commonly known as Old Central. It stood on what is now Saroca Park. When the school began it had just two teachers and fewer than 80 students. By 1912, attendance had grown to over 215 students.

The school was demolished to accommodate increased enrollment. The new high school, known as Rhinelander High School today, had its first graduation on June 4, 1959, with a class of over 200 seniors.

== Extracurricular activities ==
- Key Club: A self-governing organization service organization, this club is affiliated with the Wisconsin-Upper Michigan District and Key Club International.
- Band
- Library Club
- Mock Trial: Mock Trial simulates a courtroom trial, with students playing the roles of witnesses and attorneys in a fact situation provided by the state bar. The school holds the record for the most consecutive wins in Mock Trial. The team has 27 regional championships and 15 state championships, RHS won the National High School Mock Trial Championship in 1989 and has finished second twice.
- Debate: The RHS debate team travels and competes with other high school debaters. In 2007, the Rhinelander debate team took second place at the state competition in the novice division. In 2008, the team took first place at the state final.
- National Honor Society: The organization sponsors a scholarship drive by selling weekly "Dress Down Day" stickers to faculty. NHS calculates and distributes academic letters and bars to eligible students and sponsors the annual homecoming talent show.
- Drama: Students perform two drama productions per school year. They are involved in all facets of the production, including acting, set design, costumes, lighting, and drama competition.
- SADD: This group promotes students making healthy choices, such as seat belt use and staying drug-free. At Homecoming and Prom, it sponsors a speaker to address the student body. It also promotes Red Ribbon Week to elementary schools.
- Shodags: Shodags Show Choir is a musical song and dance group. It performs at school functions and community gatherings.
- German Club: The German Club travels to Germany as part of the German American Partnership Program every two years and hosts German students every two years. The group raises money through candy sales, fruit sales, and Advent calendar sales for both events. Other events include a lock-in, movie night, caroling, picnic, bowling, and going out to eat.
- Spanish Club: Spanish Club raises funds for foreign language trips abroad.
- Student Council: This student organization attempts to resolve issues in the school and provide services and events for the students and staff. Participants are either elected to a council office in April, a class office in May, or selected as a class representative.
- Future Business Leaders of America (FBLA)

=== Sports ===
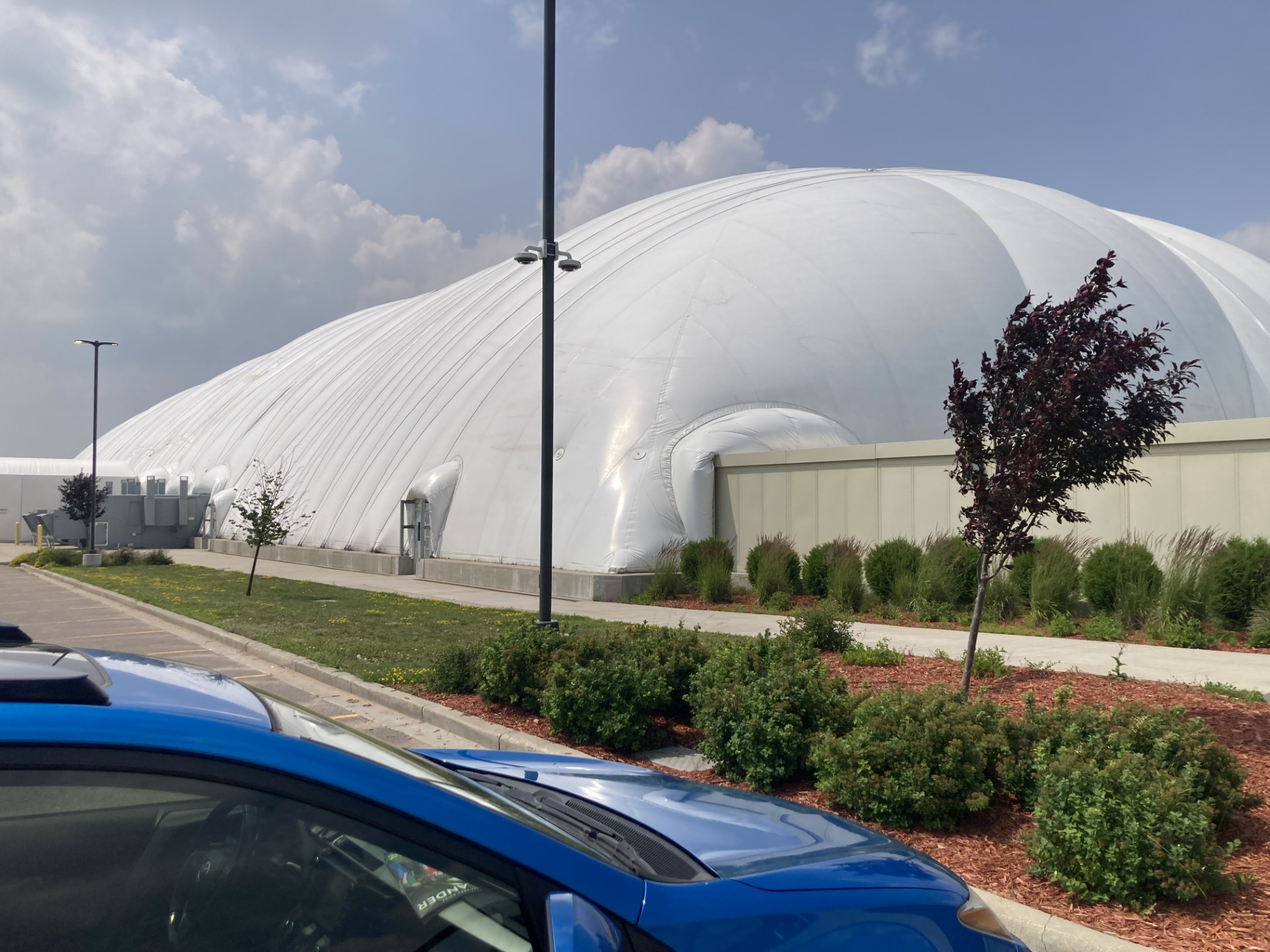
Exterior view of the Hodag Dome in Rhinelander, Wisconsin

Rhinelander High School sports include cross country, dance team, football, golf, soccer, swimming, tennis, volleyball, basketball, gymnastics, hockey, wrestling, Nordic and Alpine skiing, baseball, softball, and track and field. Rhinelander High School teams participate in the Great Northern Conference, a division two conference. Until 2010, the Hodags were a part of the Wisconsin Valley Conference, a division one conference. RHS won state championships in boys cross country in 1966 and 1987, and in girls swimming in 2020. During cold months of the year, the scholl's sports teams play many of their contests in side of the Hodag Dome, which is a 128,000 square feet air filled collapsoble dome that protects the interior from inclement weather.

==== Athletic conference affiliation history ====
- Wisconsin Valley Conference (1921-1955)
- Northern Wisconsin Conference (1955-1956)
- Wisconsin Valley Conference (1956-2010)
- Great Northern Conference (2010–present)

== Notable alumni ==
- Douglas Anderson, politician
- Jason Doering, football player
- Gene Englund, professional basketball player
- Breta Luther Griem, dietitian and television host
- Walt Kichefski, football player
- Ray Terzynski, professional basketball player
- Helen Vlahakis, movie actress known professionally as Helen Valkis and as Joan Valerie
- Mike Webster, Hall of Fame center, Pittsburgh Steelers, 1974–1988; Kansas City Chiefs, 1989–1990
- Frederick Wedge, professional boxer, clergyman, and college professor
