= Breta Luther Griem =

American dietitian

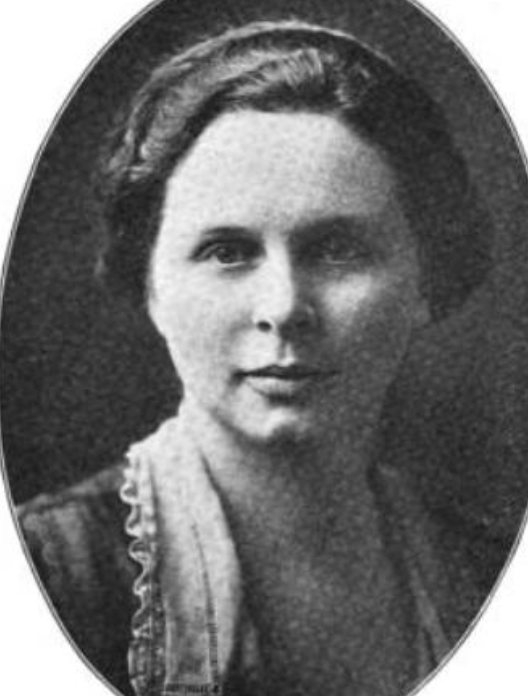
- Breta Luther Griem, from a 1923 publication
- Born: Breta Luther; May 19, 1897; Kalkaska, Michigan
- Died: April 5, 1980 (aged 82)
- Occupation: Dietitian

Breta Luther Griem (May 19, 1897 – April 5, 1980) was an American dietitian and cookbook author, based in Wisconsin. From 1949 to 1962, Griem hosted What's New in the Kitchen, a local television program broadcast in Milwaukee. She was president of the Wisconsin Dietetics Association, and the Wisconsin Women's Press Club.

== Early life and education ==
Breta Luther was born in Kalkaska, Michigan, the daughter of Ernest Leonard Luther and Mary Eddy Luther. Her father was a professor of agriculture at the University of Wisconsin's extension program. She graduated from Rhinelander High School in 1915, and from the University of Wisconsin-Madison in 1918.

== Career ==
Griem worked as a hospital dietitian in Boston and Chicago early in her career. She was active in the leadership of the American Dietetics Association in the 1920s. In 1924, she was named chair of the home economics department of the Wisconsin Federation of Women's Clubs. She was director of home service for the Gridley Dairy Company of Milwaukee for several years. She was president of the Wisconsin Dietetic Association and of the Milwaukee Dietetic Association. She was also superintendent of food concessions at the Wisconsin State Fair, and an honorary member of the Wisconsin Restaurant Association.

Griem wrote about food topics for the Milwaukee Journal, and had a column in the Wisconsin Restaurateur trade magazine. She was editor of Wisconsin Dietitian from 1946 to 1958. From 1949 to 1962, she hosted a local cooking show, What's New in the Kitchen, "one of the station's most popular programs", seen in WTMJ-TV. She was Delta Zeta Woman of the Year in 1952. In 1953 she traveled to Italy to study Italian cuisine. In 1954, she was elected president of the Wisconsin Women's Press Club. In 1955, she was honored by the Milwaukee Dairy Council.

Griem was a member of the Wisconsin Home Economics Council and the American Red Cross chapter in Milwaukee County.

== Publications ==
- The Best from Midwest Kitchens (1946, with Ada B. Lothe and Ethel M. Keating)
- 365 High Profit Luncheon Menus

== Personal life and legacy ==
Luther married Milton E. Griem in 1923. They had two children, Melvin and Margaret. Her husband, a research chemist, died in 1964, and she died in 1980, at the age of 82, in Milwaukee. There is a large collection of her recipes in the archives of the Milwaukee Public Library.
