= Wausau West High School =

Location
- 1200 W Wausau Ave; Wausau, Wisconsin 54401; USA; 44.9744°N 89.6512°W

Information
- Type: Public secondary
- Established: 1970
- School district: Wausau School District
- Principal: Jeb Steckbauer
- Teaching staff: 99.94 (FTE)
- Grades: 9–12
- Enrollment: 1,446 (2022-2023)
- Student to teacher ratio: 14.47
- Colors: Blue and Gold
- Mascot: Warrior
- Newspaper: The Warrior's Word
- Yearbook: Aurora
- Website: https://west.wausauschools.org/

Wausau West High School is a public high school serving students in grades 9 to 12 of the Wausau School District. It was built in 1970 on the west side of the city of Wausau, Wisconsin to accommodate the growing city population. Its enrollment is approximately 1,775. Its rival school is Wausau East High School.

== History ==
The first high school in Wausau was built in 1889 and later replaced by a larger building, Wausau High School, in 1898. By the mid-20th century the school was beginning to become overcrowded. This was exacerbated by a state law passed in the early 1960s that integrated schools from surrounding areas into the Wausau School District. By the end of the decade, the school district decided to build a second high school on the west side, and in 1970 Wausau's second high school opened its doors. Wausau High School was renamed Wausau East High School, and the new building on the west side of Wausau became Wausau West High School.

== Extracurricular activities ==
West provides extracurricular programs in the performing arts, athletics and academics (Science Olympiad).

=== Performing arts ===
West's drama program has performed musical and non-musical shows, such as "Little Shop of Horrors" (Fall 1995), "The Music Man" (1988), Joseph and the Amazing Technicolor Dreamcoat, Grease, Singin' in the Rain, Cinderella, "A Midsummer Night's Dream" (Spring 1993), "As You Like It" (Spring 1994), "Romeo and Juliet" (Spring 1995), "The Orange Splot" (Spring 1996) and others. The drama program participates in the Central Wisconsin Educational Theatre Alliance, a group of local high school drama teachers and students that presents more challenging productions. With funding from grants, community donations, and the profits from past performances, the organization is able to produce plays and musicals on a larger scale than is possible at the high school level. Past shows include Peter Pan, Cats, Les Misérables, Romeo and Juliet, and The Phantom of the Opera.

=== Music ===
The school music department teaches choral music, orchestra, and band. There are four choirs: freshmen, men's choir, women's choir, and concert chorale, and a select, extracurricular group known as the master singers. The choral music program has been producing Pop Concert in the spring for over five decades. This revue of pop, rock, country, and Broadway music from all periods was shown on Wisconsin Public Television in 2014. Bandstock, a fall production of the band program and some of the choirs, is a performance with a professional rock band and light show. It started as a collaboration between local rock bands and the band program.

=== Sports ===
Wausau West High School is in the WIAA Division 1 bracket. A school rivalry exists between the two Wausau High Schools, East and West, who both compete in the Wisconsin Valley Conference. During the "Log Game", the annual football game between the two schools, the schools play for possession of the traditional log. (The concept of the "log" comes from the fact that Wausau was once an important logging center.) The boys' soccer teams compete for the Wausau Rock each fall. The two schools also compete in ice hockey for possession of the Kuehlman Cup. The teams also compete, along with Mosinee and D.C. Everest, for the Marathon Cup in ice hockey.

Sports include:

- Ice hockey - Head coach, Pete Susens, is the all-time winningest coach in Wisconsin high school boys' hockey history. State runner-up 2009–2010, state champion in 2011. Conference champions in 2008, 2009, 2010, and 2011.
- Wrestling - state runner-up in 2006–2007, state champion in 2007–2008, team state runner up in 2008–2009, state champion in 2012–2013
- Cross-country running
- Football - won first post-season football game in 2007.
- Curling- state champion in 2009 (Girls), 2010 (Boys), and 2011 (Girls)
- Baseball
- Girls' swimming
- Volleyball
- Nordic skiing
- Alpine skiing
- Soccer - Conference champions 2005, 2019 (boys)
- Track and field
- Golf
- Lacrosse - third place at state in 2007
- Basketball - state runner-up in 1981, conference champion 2008–2009
- Tennis
- Dance team
- Intramural Volleyball
- Intramural Bowling
- Intramural Basketball
- Robotics

==== Athletic conference affiliation history ====
- Big Rivers Conference (1970–1973)
- Wisconsin Valley Conference (1973–present)

== Notable alumni ==
- Chris Bangle (class of 1975): automotive designer, first American chief designer at BMW
- James A. Drake, Community ecologist
- Marissa Mayer (class of 1993): former CEO of Yahoo!
- Grace Stanke (class of 2019): Miss America 2023
- Jerry Wunsch (class of 1992): American football offensive tackle for NFL teams Tampa Bay Buccaneers and Seattle Seahawks
- Nathan Condon (class of 2008): NHL draft 2008, drafted by the Colorado Avalanche in round 7, #200 overall
- Adam Parsells (class of 2015): NHL draft 2015, drafted by the San Jose Sharks in round 6, #160 overall
