= Lakeland Union High School =

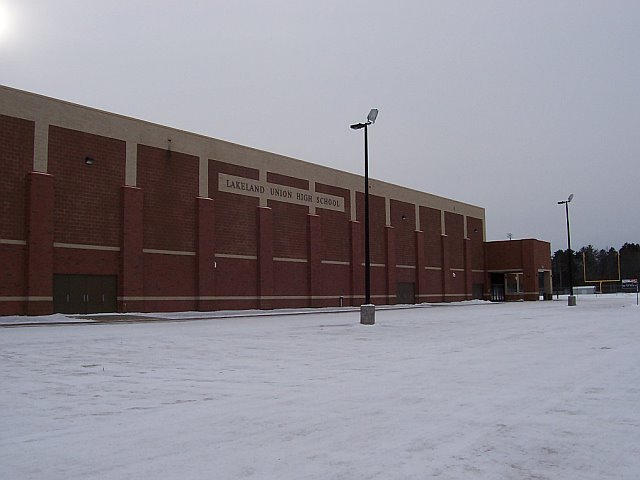

Location
- 9573 State Highway 70; Minocqua, Wisconsin 54548; United States; 45°53′13″N 89°42′28″W

Information
- Type: Public
- Principal: Levi Massey
- District Administrator: Robert J. Smudde
- Faculty: 52.07 (on FTE basis)
- Grades: 9 to 12
- Enrollment: 721 (2022-23)
- Student to teacher ratio: 13.85
- Colors: Black and White
- Athletics conference: WIAA Great Northern Conference
- Nickname: Thunderbirds
- Rival: Rhinelander High School
- Newspaper: T-Bird Newspaper
- Website: www.luhs.k12.wi.us

Lakeland Union High School (LUHS) is a high school located in Minocqua, Wisconsin. The district draws students from Oneida County and Vilas County.

== Academics ==
LUHS offers Honors and Advanced Placement (AP) courses.

== Extracurricular activities ==
=== Athletics ===
Lakeland Union High School offers 25 sports:

==== Fall ====
- Dance/Cheer
- Cross country
- Football
- Boys' soccer
- Girls' swimming
- Girls' tennis
- Volleyball

==== Winter ====
- Dance/Cheer
- Basketball
- Gymnastics
- Boys Hockey
- Girls Hockey
- Boys' swimming
- Wrestling
- Nordic skiing

==== Spring ====
- Boys' baseball
- Golf
- Girls' soccer
- Girls' softball
- Boys' tennis
- Track and field

=== Athletic conference affiliation history ===
- Northern Lakes Conference (1957-1958)
- Lumberjack Conference (1958-2008)
- Great Northern Conference (2008–present)
