= Shawano Community High School =

Public secondary school in Shawano, Wisconsin

Location
- 220 County Road B Shawano, Wisconsin 54166; United States
- 44.7592°N 88.6019°W

Information
- School type: Public High School
- Established: 1997
- Closed: Still Open
- School district: Shawano School District
- Principal: Matthew Raduechel
- Teaching staff: 44.88 (FTE)
- Grades: 9 through 12
- Enrollment: 770 (2023-2024)
- Student to teacher ratio: 17.16
- Color
- Athletics conference: Bay Conference
- Mascot: Hawks
- Rival: Gresham and Bonduel
- Website: https://www.shawanoschools.com/o/schs/

Shawano Community High School is a public high school serving Shawano, Wisconsin, and the surrounding areas.

== Athletics ==
Shawano's athletic teams are known as the Hawks, and compete in the Bay Conference.

=== Enrollment ===
From 2000 to 2019, high school enrollment declined 8.7%.

Enrollment at Shawano Community High School, 2000–2019
