= Marshfield High School (Wisconsin) =

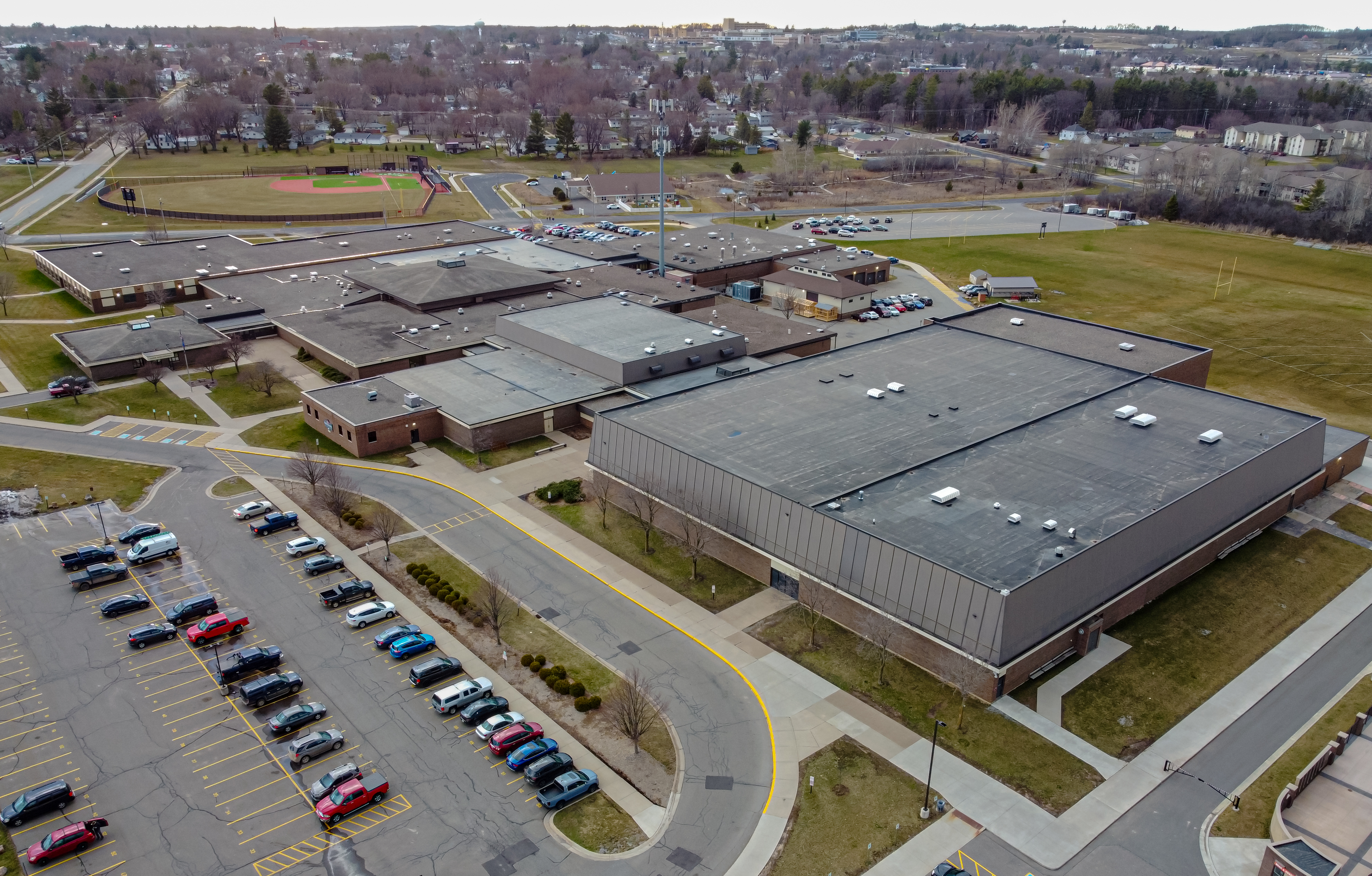

Location
- 1401 E. Becker Road; Marshfield, Wisconsin 54449; United States; 44°40′15.5″N 90°9′22″W

Information
- Type: Public high school
- School district: School District of Marshfield
- Superintendent: Ryan Christianson
- Principal: Jackson Hein
- Teaching staff: 81.84 (on an FTE basis)
- Grades: 9–12
- Enrollment: 1,244 (2023-2024)
- Student to teacher ratio: 15.20
- Colors: Orange; Black
- Athletics conference: Wisconsin Valley Conference
- Team name: Tigers
- Yearbook: Tiger
- Website: www.marshfieldschools.org/mhs

Marshfield High School (MHS) is a public, coeducational secondary school in Marshfield, Wood County, Wisconsin. It is the sole high school serving the School District of Marshfield. The school's principal is Jackson Hein.

== Demographics ==
The demographic breakdown of the 1,242 students enrolled in 2022–23 was:

- Male – 48.5%
- Female – 51.5%
- American Indian/Alaska Native – 0.6%
- Asian – 2.1%
- Black – 1.3%
- Hispanic – 7.4%
- Native Hawaiian/Pacific Islander – 0.1%
- White – 85.7%
- Multiracial – 2.8%

Additionally, 415 students (33.4%) were eligible for reduced-price or free lunch.

== Notable alumni ==
- Daulton Varsho - MLB catcher and outfielder
- Chuck Neinas – sports administrator

== See also ==
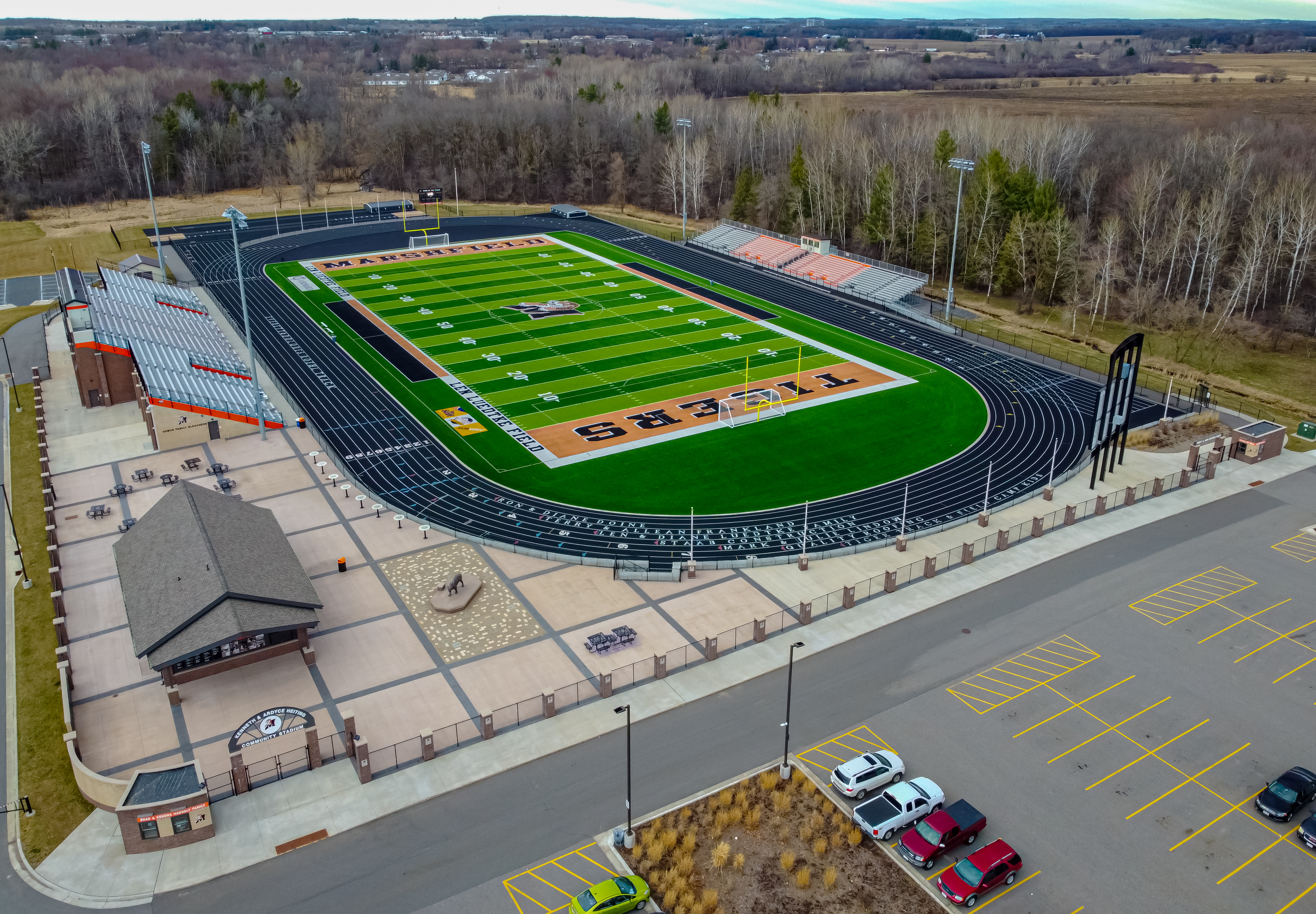
Marshfield High School football field

- List of high schools in Wisconsin
- Columbus Catholic High School
