= Stevens Point Area Senior High School =

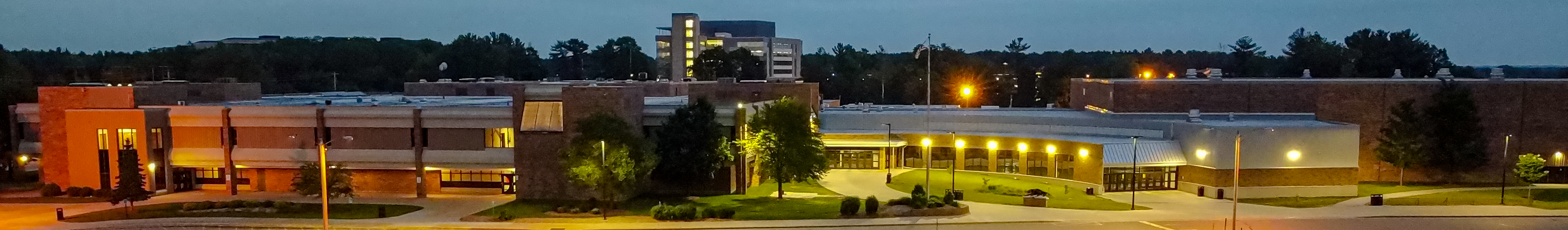

Location
- 1201 North Point Drive; Stevens Point, Wisconsin 54481; United States; 44°32′25″N 89°34′55″W

Information
- Type: Public high school
- Established: 1972
- Principal: Jon Vollendorf
- Teaching staff: 93.70 (FTE)
- Enrollment: 1,458 (2023–2024)
- Student to teacher ratio: 15.56
- Colors: Red and black
- Athletics conference: Wisconsin Valley
- Mascot: Black Panther
- Nickname: Panthers
- Website: spash.pointschools.net

Stevens Point Area Senior High (commonly called SPASH) is a high school located in Stevens Point, Wisconsin, United States. It is part of the Stevens Point Area Public School District. SPASH serves the Stevens Point area, including Stevens Point, Plover, Whiting, and Park Ridge, as well as several towns and nearby Junction City and part of Milladore. The school opened in 1972, allowing the district high school to move from P. J. Jacobs which had housed the high school since 1938.

== Athletics ==
SPASH's athletic teams are nicknamed the Panthers, and they have been affiliated with the Wisconsin Valley Conference since its founding in 1921.

== Notable alumni ==
- Kirk Bangstad, brewer and political candidate
- Kathi Bennett, women's basketball head coach
- Aimee Betro, convicted of attempting to carry out a contract killing in the UK
- Cole Caufield, NHL forward
- Curt Clausen, Olympic race walker
- Rachel A. Graham, Wisconsin state court judge
- Suzy Favor Hamilton, Olympic long-distance runner
- Joey Hauser, professional basketball player
- Sam Hauser, professional basketball player
- Arthur L. Herman, popular historian
- Kathy Kinney, actress
- Julie Lassa, Wisconsin politician
- Janel McCarville, professional basketball player
- Louis Molepske, Wisconsin politician and judge
- William Murat, Wisconsin politician
- Joe Pavelski, NHL forward and 2010 Olympic silver medalist
- Brandon Peterson, Marvel comic book artist
- Ben Provisor, Olympic Greco-Roman Wrestler
- Ryan Ramczyk, tackle, New Orleans Saints
- Rick Reichardt, major league baseball player
- Chris Solinsky, long-distance runner, former American record holder in the 10,000m run
- Roisin Willis, track and field athlete
