= Wausau East High School =

Location
- 2607 N. 18th Street; Wausau, Wisconsin 54403; United States; 44.9812°N 89.5975°W

Information
- Type: Public Secondary
- Motto: Everyone Achieves Success Together
- Founded: 1898
- School district: Wausau School District
- NCES District ID: 5515900
- CEEB code: 502414
- NCES School ID: 551590002063
- Principal: Luke Barth
- Teaching staff: 69.64 (FTE)
- Grades: 9–12
- Enrollment: 902 (2022-2023)
  - Grade 9: 227
  - Grade 10: 231
  - Grade 11: 227
  - Grade 12: 217
- Student to teacher ratio: 12.95
- Color: Red Black White
- Mascot: The Lumberjacks
- Rival: Wausau West High School
- Accreditation: Wisconsin Department of Public Instruction
- USNWR ranking: Unranked (2016)
- Publication: The Skyrocket
- Yearbook: The WAHISCAN
- Website: east.wausauschools.org

Wausau East High School is a public secondary school in Wausau, Wisconsin. It serves grades 9-12 for the Wausau School District.

== History ==
Wausau High School (Pre-1936)

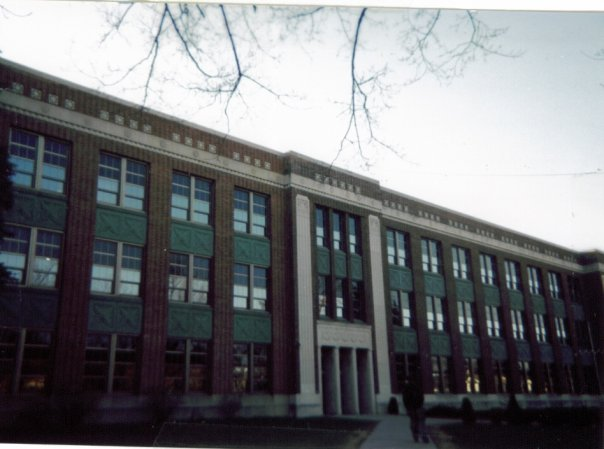
Wausau East High School (1936-2004)

Wausau East High School (current building)

The first high school in Wausau was a two-room school house built in 1880 and occupied by multiple grades. When Washington School was erected as the high school in 1889 for $12,400, the city thought the school was too big. In 1897, when the school became overcrowded, five rooms in the court house were rented for classroom space. In 1898, a new high school was built at the cost of $65,000 by Van Ryn and DeGelleke of Milwaukee, on the corner of Seventh and Eighth Streets. Far from the center of the city, many city residents complained that it was too distant and others thought it was too large. The school opened its doors in 1900. Charles C. Parlin, the school's first principal, served until 1911. That school became known as Wausau High School until 1936, when it became Wausau Senior High School. A final name change occurred in 1970, the last year that Wausau had one high school. In 1971 two high schools served the Wausau School District, Wausau West High School, and now Wausau East High School.

In the early years, Wausau East housed two sections for seventh and eighth graders, kindergarten, and the Marathon County Normal School. The school taught subjects such as home economics, sciences, and social studies. Students who did not behave could be expelled and placed in vocational schools. There were no buses to transport students to school and few rural students attended. Students were required to dress formally, boys in short pants and ties, and girls in dresses that reached their knees.

The original school had an assembly room capable of holding 1,000 students. It was once said that students and teachers were proud of its angled floors, which gave them a good view of all activities on the stage.

During the Great Depression, with the help of the Works Progress Administration, the city expanded the 1898 building with a new three-story Victorian style addition facing Seventh and Hamilton Streets. The first phase of construction began in 1934 and included an addition that featured hand-crafted wall tiles, a large mural depicting lumberjacks cutting trees displayed in the main entrance, and Art Moderne architectural motifs. It was designed by Oppenhamer & Opel, the architecture firm also responsible for the Grand Theatre. The building also contained a series of tunnels, which were used mainly for heating the building. This addition to Wausau High School opened in 1936.

The second phase began in the early 1950s, when E.H. Boettcher was the principal. It consisted of the construction of the theater, band, art, and social sciences classrooms. Underneath the theater was a nuclear fallout shelter. This phase was completed in 1954.

The last phase occurred in the 1960s, with the addition of the gymnasium and cafeteria. However, due to a lack of funds, the plan to demolish the 1898 structure and replace it with an identical extension of the 1936 phase was never put into action.

In 1979, under the principalship of John Crubaugh, the original 1898 building was demolished by Williams Wrecking of Wausau at a cost of $53,000 because officials thought that it was an unsafe structure. The lost classroom space was then replaced with portable classrooms until a two-story addition with a second floor library was constructed and opened in 1986. The new addition consisted of classroom space for special education, administrative offices, teacher offices, and science classrooms. During this time, Wausau East High School also went through extensive renovation, including lowering of the ceilings and dividing the old library into three discussion rooms and classrooms (primarily English Language Learner rooms).

Because of overcrowding at the aging high school in the late 1990s, the community began to discuss the school's future, debating whether the landlocked school should be expanded or converted into Horace Mann Middle School, allowing the middle school to be renovated into a high school. The option of building an entirely new high school was also discussed. In 1999, the voters of Wausau passed a referendum to construct a new high school, to be located on 18th Street, a site that had been proposed in the 1970s. The graduating class of 2004 was the last class to walk the halls of the old Wausau East High School. The new school opened its doors in September 2004. The former high school, owned by Stone House Development of Madison, Wisconsin, has been renovated into apartments for middle and lower income families. As part of an agreement with the school district and city, Stone House Development retained the building's character as a school. This included keeping the lockers, the hand-crafted tiles, and the window fixtures. Since 2004, the old school building has been listed on the National Register of Historic Places. The 1960 and 1986 additions have been demolished, and made into a parking lot for tenants of the complex. The site was recently further developed for townhouses and opened in September 2008. The future of the theater remains unknown.

In 2009 Wausau East High School received a grant from the Walter Alexander Foundation to support the education of renewable energy. This grant allowed for the installation of a 100 kW wind turbine, along with a smaller 10 kW and 2.9 kW solar array. These power sources have been combined with classroom learning to allow students hands-on access to next-generation power.

== Athletics ==
The official mascot of Wausau East High School is the Lumberjacks, which was also the mascot from the original Wausau High. The mascot was selected because of the importance of logging to the community of Wausau.

=== Wausau East High School sports ===
Sports include: Boys' & girls' curling, Boys' & girls' basketball, Boys' & girls' track, Boys' & girls' cross country, Boys' & girls' cross country skiing, Girls' cheer team, Football, Boys' hockey, Girls' hockey (city team), Boys' wrestling, Boys' soccer, Girls' soccer, Girls' softball, Boys' baseball, Boys' & girls' tennis, Boys' golf, Girls' volleyball, Boys' & girls' swimming, Alpine skiing, and Snowboarding.

Wausau East also has intramural flag football, basketball, and volleyball. Intramural teams collect food for local food pantries.

The Wausau East boys' curling team won two consecutive state titles (2006 and 2007). The Wausau East girls' cross country teams won two consecutive WIAA Division 1 state titles (2009 and 2010). Former football coach Win Brockmeyer was the coach at Wausau High School from 1937 to 1970. Brockmeyer's teams had a 230-33-9 record, were undefeated in 13 seasons, and won 26 conference titles. In the 1940s, he had a 72-2-4 record that included a 46-game winning streak. A scholarship was later named in his honor. As Wausau High School, the school won state boys' cross country championships in 1956 and 1957.

=== Athletic conference affiliation history ===
- Wisconsin Valley Conference (1921-1956)
- Big Rivers Conference (1956-1973)
- Wisconsin Valley Conference (1973–present)

== International Baccalaureate ==
Wausau East High School has been an International Baccalaureate (IB) World School since October 1978, and was one of the first public schools in the United States to offer the IB program. The program is open to all students in grades 11–12. Students taking IB courses may earn college credit through their IB exams at the end of the year which could allow them to begin college with sophomore status. An IB diploma is offered to those who successfully complete the program; students may elect to take just a few IB courses or pursue the IB diploma, which has extra requirements outside of the courses themselves. The state-funded program is offered in English. Enrollment in the IB Diploma Program is self-selective and averages 22 students.

== Notable alumni ==
- Jeff Dellenbach, NFL football player (1985–1999)
- Klas Eklund, Swedish economist and politician
- Luke Fenhaus, 2022, professional race car driver (NASCAR Craftsman Truck Series)
- Elroy "Crazy Legs" Hirsch, NFL hall of fame football player (1946–1957)
- Sue R. Magnuson, Wisconsin state legislator (1984–1992)
- John L. McEwen, Wisconsin state legislator (1981–1982)
- Dave Obey, U.S. Congressman (1969–2011)
- Jim Otto, NFL hall of fame football player (1960–1974)
- Melissa Ratcliff, Wisconsin state legislator (2023–present)
- Frank Schade, professional basketball player (1972–1973)
- Ed Sparr, NFL player (1926)

== Notable staff ==
- Win Brockmeyer, Wausau Senior High School football coach from 1937 to 1970
