= Northwest Football League (Wisconsin) =

Wisconsin high school football conference (1994-1995)

The Northwest Football League is a former high school football conference with its membership base in northwestern Wisconsin. It was only in existence for the 1994 and 1995 seasons, and its members were affiliated with the Wisconsin Interscholastic Athletic Association.

== History ==
The Northwest Football League was founded in 1994 when two high school athletic conferences in northwestern Wisconsin (the Heart O'North and Middle Border) merged for football into an eighteen-member, three-division superconference. They were joined by two members of the Dunn-St. Croix Conference that were previously affiliated with the MBC (Mondovi and Prescott). This was the WIAA's first attempt to create a football-only conference; they had existed in the past but were created before the WIAA's organizational structure brought conference realignment under its scope:

Red Conference	White Conference	Blue Conference
Amery	Barron	Baldwin-Woodville
Durand-Arkansaw	Bloomer	Chetek
Ellsworth	Ladysmith	Cumberland
Hayward	Northwestern	Mondovi
New Richmond	Osceola	Prescott
Spooner	Unity	St. Croix Falls

This arrangement lasted for two seasons until the Northwest Football League was dissolved after the 1995 season. The main factor leading to the conference's ending was that members were grouped together primarily by enrollment with little regard to proximity to each other, which created long travel distances and interrupted long-standing rivalries. The Heart O'North Conference and Middle Border Conference resumed sponsoring their own football conferences for the 1996 season.

== Conference membership history ==
School	Location	Affiliation	Mascot	Colors	Conference	Primary Conference
Amery	Amery, WI	Public	Warriors		Red	Middle Border
Baldwin-Woodville	Baldwin, WI	Public	Blackhawks		Blue	Middle Border
Barron	Barron, WI	Public	Golden Bears		White	Heart O'North
Bloomer	Bloomer, WI	Public	Blackhawks		White	Heart O'North
Chetek	Chetek, WI	Public	Bulldogs		Blue	Heart O'North
Cumberland	Cumberland, WI	Public	Beavers		Blue	Heart O'North
Durand-Arkansaw	Durand, WI	Public	Panthers		Red	Middle Border
Ellsworth	Ellsworth, WI	Public	Panthers		Red	Middle Border
Hayward	Hayward, WI	Public	Hurricanes		Red	Heart O'North
Ladysmith	Ladysmith, WI	Public	Lumberjacks		White	Heart O'North
Mondovi	Mondovi, WI	Public	Buffaloes		Blue	Dunn-St. Croix
New Richmond	New Richmond, WI	Public	Tigers		Red	Middle Border
Northwestern	Maple, WI	Public	Tigers		White	Heart O'North
Osceola	Osceola, WI	Public	Chieftains		White	Middle Border
Prescott	Prescott, WI	Public	Cardinals		Blue	Dunn-St. Croix
Spooner	Spooner, WI	Public	Rails		Red	Heart O'North
St. Croix Falls	St. Croix Falls, WI	Public	Saints		Blue	Middle Border
Unity	Balsam Lake, WI	Public	Eagles		White	Middle Border

== Membership timeline ==
Red Conference White Conference Blue Conference

== List of conference champions ==
School	Quantity	Years
Baldwin-Woodville	2	1994, 1995
New Richmond	2	1994, 1995
Northwestern	2	1994, 1995
Amery	0	
Barron	0	
Bloomer	0	
Chetek	0	
Cumberland	0	
Durand-Arkansaw	0	
Ellsworth	0	
Hayward	0	
Ladysmith	0	
Mondovi	0	
Osceola	0	
Prescott	0	
Spooner	0	
St. Croix Falls	0	
Unity	0	
