= Head of the Lakes Conference =

High school athletic conference (1918–1954)

The Head of the Lakes Conference is a former high school athletic conference with membership in close proximity to the Twin Ports region of Minnesota and Wisconsin. Founded in 1918 and disbanded by 1954, its public school members belonged to the Minnesota State High School League and the Wisconsin Interscholastic Athletic Association.

== History ==
=== 1918–1939 ===
Location of Original Head of the Lakes Conference Members:

The Head of the Lakes Conference traces its origin to May 1918, when six high schools in the Duluth metropolitan area held a track meet. The schools participating in that meet were the original members of the conference: Cathedral in Duluth, Denfeld, Duluth Central, Nelson Dewey in Superior, Proctor and Superior Central. Basketball and football would become sponsored sports later that fall, and the original lineup would remain intact until 1920, when Proctor left the group. They would be replaced by the recently opened Morgan Park High School of Duluth in 1921. In 1924, the Head of the Lakes Conference lost Duluth Cathedral and Nelson Dewey as members and were replaced by three incoming schools: Cloquet, Superior East and Two Harbors. The next year, Proctor rejoined the conference to increase membership to eight schools. A ninth school was added in 1928 when Duluth Cathedral rejoined the conference, and in 1929, Superior Cathedral became members. It was around this time that the conference became known informally as the Little Big Ten Conference.

=== 1939–1954 ===
Location of Final Head of the Lakes Conference Members:

In 1939, six members of the Head of the Lakes Conference (Cloquet, Denfeld, Duluth Central, Morgan Park, Proctor and Two Harbors) formed the Big Six Conference. All six schools maintained dual membership in the Head of the Lakes Conference during its existence. An eleventh school was added in 1951 when Duluth East opened its doors. By this time, the Head of the Lakes Conference was an organization in name only, lacking a league structure and having records kept by the local newspapers. For the 1954-55 school year, the local media stopped covering the Head of the Lakes Conference in favor of the newly renamed Big Eight Conference. The seven schools with dual membership would continue their affiliation with the Big Eight, and that conference continues to this day as the Lake Superior Conference. The other four schools (Duluth Cathedral, Superior Cathedral, Superior East and Superior Central) continued competition as independents. Superior East (1961-1965) and Superior Cathedral (1965-1969) both played for a brief period in the Michigan-Wisconsin Conference, and Duluth Cathedral would join the Lake Superior Conference in 1974. All three Superior schools would eventually close, with Central and East merging into a single Superior High School in 1965 and Superior Cathedral being closed by the Diocese of Superior in 1969.

== Conference membership history ==
School	Location	Affiliation	Mascot	Colors	Joined	Left	Conference Joined	Current Conference
Cathedral	Duluth, MN	Private (Catholic)	Hilltoppers		1918, 1928	1924, 1954	Independent	Lake Superior (as Marshall School)
Denfeld	Duluth, MN	Public	Hunters		1918	1954	Big Eight	Lake Superior
Duluth Central	Duluth, MN	Public	Trojans		1918	1954	Big Eight	Closed in 2011 (merged into Denfeld)
Nelson Dewey	Superior, WI	Public	East Enders		1918	1924	Closed (replaced by Superior East)	
Proctor	Proctor, MN	Public	Rails		1918, 1925	1920, 1954	Big Eight	Lake Superior
Superior Central	Superior, WI	Public	Vikings		1918	1954	Independent	Closed in 1965 (merged into Superior)
Morgan Park	Duluth, MN	Public	Wildcats		1921	1954	Big Eight	Closed in 1982 (merged into Denfeld)
Cloquet	Cloquet, MN	Public	Lumberjacks		1924	1954	Big Eight	Lake Superior
Superior East	Superior, WI	Public	Orientals		1924	1954	Independent	Closed in 1965 (merged into Superior)
Two Harbors	Two Harbors, MN	Public	Agates		1924	1954	Big Eight	Polar League
Cathedral	Superior, WI	Private (Catholic)	Panthers		1929	1954	Independent	Closed in 1969
Duluth East	Duluth, MN	Public	Greyhounds		1951	1954	Big Eight	Independent

== List of state champions ==
=== Fall sports ===
Boys Cross Country
School	Year	Organization
Duluth Central	1943	MSHSL
Duluth Central	1945	MSHSL
Duluth Central	1949	MSHSL
Duluth Central	1951	MSHSL

=== Winter sports ===
Boys Alpine Skiing
School	Year	Organization
Duluth Central	1939	MSHSL
Duluth Central	1943	MSHSL
Duluth Central	1944	MSHSL
Cloquet	1945	MSHSL
Duluth Central	1946	MSHSL
Duluth Central	1947	MSHSL
Cloquet	1948	MSHSL
Duluth Central	1949	MSHSL
Cloquet	1950	MSHSL
Cloquet	1951	MSHSL
Cloquet	1952	MSHSL
Duluth East	1953	MSHSL
Duluth East	1954	MSHSL

Boys Basketball
School	Year	Organization	Division
Superior Central	1920	WIAA	
Superior Central	1935	WIAA	Class A
Superior Central	1936	WIAA	Class A
Denfeld	1947	MSHSL	
Duluth Central	1950	MSHSL	

Boys Nordic Skiing
School	Year	Organization
Duluth Central	1933	MSHSL
Duluth Central	1934	MSHSL
Duluth Central	1935	MSHSL
Duluth Central	1936	MSHSL
Duluth Central	1939	MSHSL
Duluth Central	1940	MSHSL
Duluth Central	1941	MSHSL
Duluth Central	1942	MSHSL
Duluth Central	1943	MSHSL
Duluth Central	1944	MSHSL
Duluth Central	1945	MSHSL
Duluth Central	1946	MSHSL
Duluth Central	1947	MSHSL
Cloquet	1948	MSHSL
Duluth Central	1949	MSHSL
Duluth Central	1950	MSHSL
Cloquet	1951	MSHSL
Cloquet	1952	MSHSL
Duluth Central	1953	MSHSL
Duluth Central	1954	MSHSL

=== Spring sports ===
Baseball
School	Year	Organization
Denfeld	1950	MSHSL

Boys Golf
School	Year	Organization
Duluth Central	1946	MSHSL
Duluth Central	1947	MSHSL
Duluth Central	1948	MSHSL

Boys Track & Field
School	Year	Organization	Division
Duluth Central	1923	MSHSL	Class B
Duluth Central	1930	MSHSL	
Duluth Central	1935	MSHSL	
Duluth Central	1936	MSHSL	
Denfeld	1949	MSHSL	
