= Matt Niskanen =

American ice hockey player (born 1986)

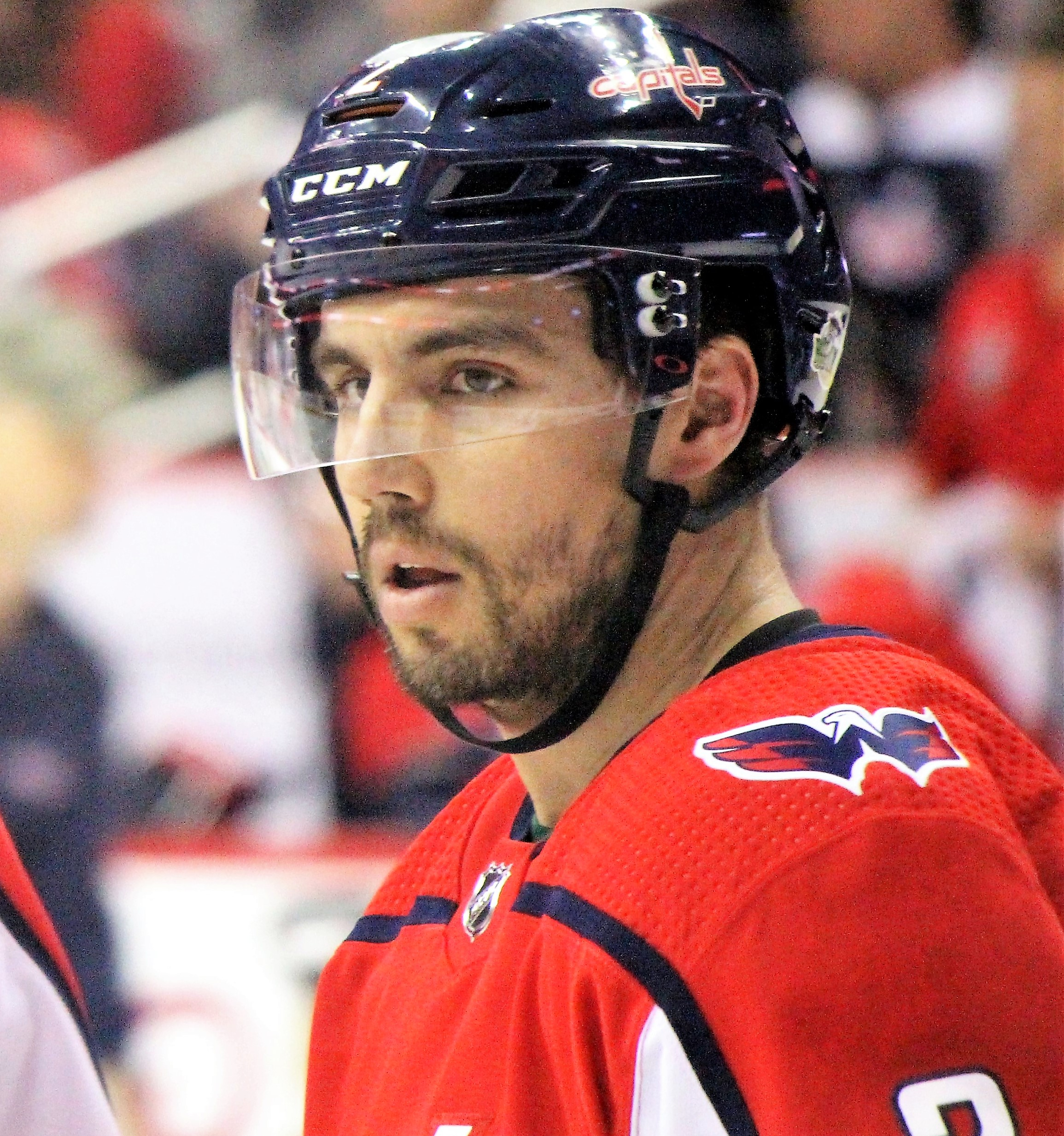
- Niskanen with the Washington Capitals in April 2018
- Born: December 6, 1986 (age 39) Virginia, Minnesota, U.S.
- Height: 6 ft 0 in (183 cm)
- Weight: 204 lb (93 kg; 14 st 8 lb)
- Position: Defense
- Shot: Right
- Played for: Dallas Stars; Pittsburgh Penguins; Washington Capitals; Philadelphia Flyers
- National team: United States
- NHL draft: 28th overall, 2005; Dallas Stars
- Playing career: 2007–2020

Matthew Norman Niskanen (born December 6, 1986) is an American former professional ice hockey defenseman. He played 13 seasons in the National Hockey League (NHL) with the Dallas Stars, Pittsburgh Penguins, Washington Capitals, and Philadelphia Flyers from 2007 to 2020.

After his NHL player career, Niskanen began role as head coach of the Rock Ridge Wolverines Boys Hockey team in Virginia in 2024.

He was drafted by the Stars in the first round, 28th overall, in the 2005 NHL entry draft. Niskanen won the Stanley Cup as a member of the Capitals in 2018.

== Early life ==
Niskanen is a Finnish American, explaining his Finnish surname. However he does not speak Finnish.

Niskanen played ice hockey for Virginia High School in the Minnesota State High School League from 2003 to 2005, and was on the Blue Devils' roster at their first state hockey tournament appearance in 2005. In addition to hockey, Niskanen played baseball and American football, and appeared in the state quarterfinals for the Mountain Iron-Buhl Rangers nine-man football team in 2004. He chose to commit to hockey after his high school graduation, citing it as his strongest sport.

== Playing career ==
=== Amateur ===
Niskanen attended the University of Minnesota Duluth (UMD). At the 2005 NHL entry draft, he was selected in the first round, 28th overall, by the Dallas Stars.

In 2005-06, his freshman season for the Bulldogs men's ice hockey team, he recorded 14 points in 38 games. Before that, Niskanen played for the Virginia/Mountain Iron-Buhl boys' hockey team and helped bring the Blue Devils to their first state high school tournament appearance in school history. During 2006–07, his sophomore season at UMD, he scored 9 goals and 22 assists in 39 games. Niskanen was named to the 2006–07 All WCHA First Team, and the All WCHA academic Team.

Niskanen decided to leave college and turn professional after his sophomore season at UMD. On March 19, 2007, he signed an amateur tryout contract with the Iowa Stars—the Dallas Stars' American Hockey League (AHL) affiliate at the time—for the remainder of the 2006–07 season. He later signed a three-year NHL contract with the Dallas Stars which began in 2007–08. He subsequently made the Stars' 2007–08 NHL roster out of training camp.

=== Professional ===
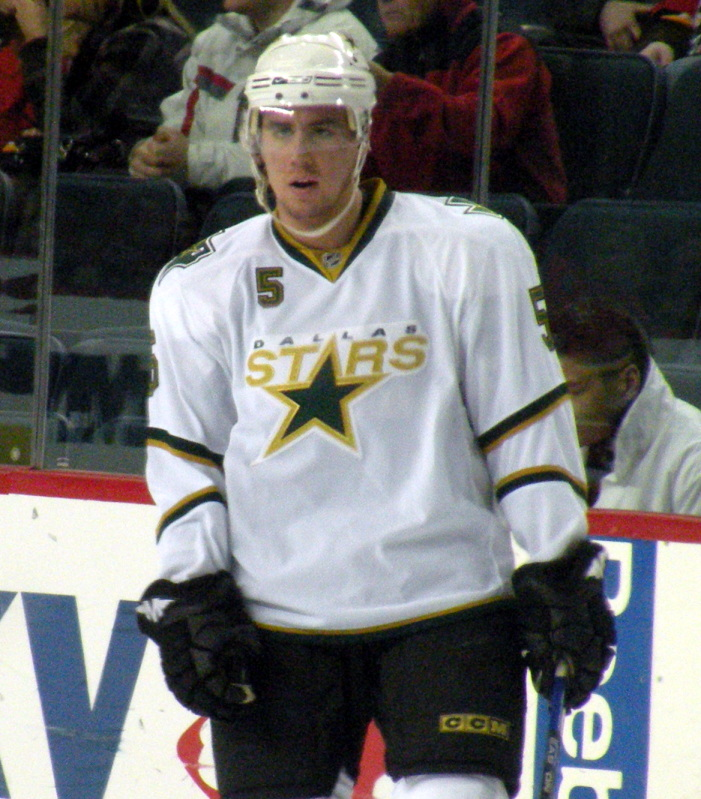
Niskanen in March 2009 with the Stars.

==== Dallas Stars ====
Niskanen made his NHL regular season debut against the Colorado Avalanche on October 3, 2007 to open the 2007–08 season. He recorded his first NHL points against the Boston Bruins two nights later with two assists. His first NHL goal came on October 29, 2007, against the San Jose Sharks. Niskanen had an excellent rookie start with the Stars, leading the team in plus/minus at mid-season, which resulted in his being invited to the Young Stars game during the 2008 NHL All-Star weekend.

==== Pittsburgh Penguins ====
On February 21, 2011, Niskanen was traded (along with teammate James Neal) to the Pittsburgh Penguins in exchange for defenseman Alex Goligoski.

During the 2013–14 season, on March 4, 2014, Niskanen had his first multi-goal game with a two-goal effort in a 3–1 win over the Nashville Predators away at the Bridgestone Arena. In the final year of his contract with the Penguins and approaching free agency, Niskanen finished the season establishing new career highs in goals (10) and assists (36) for 46 points.

==== Washington Capitals ====
Niskanen (#2) defends the goal area during a shot to prevent Sidney Crosby (far left) from getting a rebound in May 2017.

On July 1, 2014, Niskanen signed a seven-year, $40.25 million contract as a free agent with the Washington Capitals.

In the 2017–18 season, Niskanen continued to play top-four pairing minutes with the Capitals, posting 7 goals and 29 points in 68 games. He recorded nine points and appeared in all 24 games of the playoffs while logging over 25 minutes of ice time to help the Washington Capitals claim their first Stanley Cup.

Returning for his 12th season in the NHL in 2018–19, Niskanen contributed with 8 goals and 17 assists for 25 points in 80 regular season games for the Capitals. He posted 2 assists in 7 playoff games; the Capitals exited the playoffs with a first-round defeat to the Carolina Hurricanes.

==== Philadelphia Flyers ====
On June 14, 2019, with two-years still remaining on his contract, Niskanen was traded by the Capitals to the Philadelphia Flyers in exchange for defenceman Radko Gudas. In the 2019–20 season, Niskanen played alongside Ivan Provorov on the Flyers' top pairing and placed second among Flyers defensemen with 33 points in 68 games. On February 21, Niskanen was fined $5,000 USD, the maximum allowable under the NHL Collective Bargaining Agreement, for a slashing penalty against Columbus Blue Jackets forward Gustav Nyquist. At the time that the 2019–20 NHL season was suspended due to the COVID-19 pandemic, Niskanen had recorded 124 hits, 84 blocked shots, and eight goals.

During the 2020 Stanley Cup playoffs, Niskanen was suspended for one game for a cross-check against Montreal Canadiens winger Brendan Gallagher that fractured Gallagher's jaw. Niskanen produced one goal and one assist in 15 postseason games for Philadelphia.

With one season remaining on his contract, Niskanen announced his sudden retirement from professional hockey on October 5, 2020, at the age of 33. His agent Neil Sheehy reported that the decision resulted from uncertainty surrounding the COVID-19 pandemic and the medical protocols taken by the NHL.

== International play ==
Niskanen has represented the United States at various international competitions at the junior and professional level. His first time representing the United States in international competition was at the 2006 World Junior Ice Hockey Championships. In 2016, he was chosen to represent the United States in the 2016 World Cup of Hockey, along with fellow Capitals John Carlson and T. J. Oshie.

== Career statistics ==
=== Regular season and playoffs ===
			Regular season					Playoffs
Season	Team	League	GP	G	A	Pts	PIM	GP	G	A	Pts	PIM
2003–04	Virginia High School	HS-MN	32	24	37	61	28	—	—	—	—	—
2004–05	Virginia High School	HS-MN	29	27	38	65	34	—	—	—	—	—
2005–06	University of Minnesota Duluth	WCHA	38	1	13	14	40	—	—	—	—	—
2006–07	University of Minnesota Duluth	WCHA	39	9	22	31	42	—	—	—	—	—
2006–07	Iowa Stars	AHL	13	0	3	3	6	12	2	5	7	10
2007–08	Dallas Stars	NHL	78	7	19	26	36	16	0	3	3	10
2008–09	Dallas Stars	NHL	80	6	29	35	52	—	—	—	—	—
2009–10	Dallas Stars	NHL	74	3	12	15	18	—	—	—	—	—
2010–11	Dallas Stars	NHL	45	0	6	6	30	—	—	—	—	—
2010–11	Pittsburgh Penguins	NHL	18	1	3	4	20	7	0	1	1	0
2011–12	Pittsburgh Penguins	NHL	75	4	17	21	47	4	1	2	3	6
2012–13	Pittsburgh Penguins	NHL	40	4	10	14	12	15	0	2	2	11
2013–14	Pittsburgh Penguins	NHL	81	10	36	46	51	13	2	7	9	8
2014–15	Washington Capitals	NHL	82	4	27	31	47	14	0	4	4	0
2015–16	Washington Capitals	NHL	82	5	27	32	38	12	0	3	3	6
2016–17	Washington Capitals	NHL	78	5	34	39	32	13	1	3	4	19
2017–18	Washington Capitals	NHL	68	7	22	29	36	24	1	8	9	8
2018–19	Washington Capitals	NHL	80	8	17	25	41	7	0	2	2	0
2019–20	Philadelphia Flyers	NHL	68	8	25	33	29	15	1	1	2	6
NHL totals			949	72	284	356	489	140	6	36	42	74

=== International ===
Year	Team	Event	Result	GP	G	A	Pts	PIM
2006	United States	WJC	4th	7	0	0	0	6
2009	United States	WC	4th	9	1	2	3	2
2016	United States	WCH	7th	3	0	0	0	0
Junior totals				7	0	0	0	6
Senior totals				12	1	2	3	2

== Awards and honors ==
Award	Year
College
All-WCHA First Team	2007
NHL
NHL YoungStars Game	2008
Stanley Cup champion	2018

Awards and achievements
Preceded by Mark Fistric	Dallas Stars first-round draft pick 2005	Succeeded by Ivan Vishnevskiy
