= Heart O'North Conference =

Wisconsin high school athletic conference

The Heart O'North Conference is a high school athletic conference with its membership base in northwestern Wisconsin. Founded in 1928, the conference and its member schools are affiliated with the Wisconsin Interscholastic Athletic Association.

== History ==
=== 1928-1989 ===
Location of Original Heart O'North Conference Members

The Heart O'North Conference (also known as the Heart o' the North Conference in its early years) was formed in 1928 by ten small- to medium-sized high schools in northwestern Wisconsin: Barron, Bloomer, Cameron, Chetek, Clayton, Cumberland, Ladysmith, Rice Lake, Shell Lake and Spooner. One year later, the league added New Auburn and Turtle Lake to its roster, bringing membership up to twelve schools. Football was also added as a sponsored sport, with six schools (Barron, Bloomer, Cumberland, Ladysmith, Rice Lake and Spooner) comprising the initial roster. In 1934, membership in the Heart O'North was cut in half after the exit of the six non-football members (Cameron, Chetek, Clayton, New Auburn, Shell Lake and Turtle Lake). Five of these schools joined with Clear Lake and Weyerhaeuser to form the Lakeland Conference. The six remaining schools continued for twelve years before Hayward was admitted as the Heart O’North's seventh member in 1946. Chetek's return to the conference from the Lakeland Conference in 1957 increased the membership ledger to eight schools, a level it would remain at for seventeen years. In 1974, Northwestern High School in Maple joined the Heart O'North Conference after their longtime membership in the Michigan-Wisconsin Conference ended the year prior when the organization ceased operations.

=== 1989-present ===
After Northwestern joined the Heart O'North in 1974, the conference continued with a nine-member roster for fifteen years, until Bloomer and Rice Lake left in 1989. Bloomer joined the Middle Border Conference, and Rice Lake became members of the larger Big Rivers Conference as an all-sport member (they had previously been football-only members since 1986). After five years in the Middle Border, Bloomer rejoined the Heart O'North Conference in 1994. That same year, the Heart O'North briefly ended football sponsorship to join the Northwest Football League along with members of the Middle Border and Dunn-St. Croix Conferences. This arrangement would last for two seasons, after which the conference resumed sponsorship of interscholastic football. Membership remained stable until 2010, when Chetek High School merged with Weyerhaeuser High School of the Lakeland Conference to form the new Chetek-Weyerhaeuser High School. The new school inherited Chetek's place in the Heart O'North Conference. In 2019, Cameron rejoined the Heart O'North after leaving the conference eighty-five years ago to help form the Lakeland Conference, which they were still members of at the time of their exit. Two years later, the Heart O'North Conference accepted two new members and bid farewell to a longtime member. Bloomer exited the conference for a second time in 2021, this time to join the Cloverbelt Conference. Ashland and St. Croix Falls became Heart O'North members that same year; St. Croix Falls joined from Lakeland Conference and Ashland were previously members of the Minnesota-based Lake Superior Conference. Chetek-Weyerhaeuser left the Heart O'North in 2025 to join the Dunn-St. Croix Conference and were replaced by outgoing Lakeland Conference members Unity.

=== Football-only alignment ===
In February 2019, in conjunction with the Wisconsin Football Coaches Association, the WIAA released a sweeping football-only realignment for Wisconsin to commence with the 2020 football season and run on a two-year cycle. For the first cycle, Hayward and Ladysmith left the Heart O'North football roster to join the Great Northern Conference and Lakeland Conference, respectively, as associate football-only members. This alignment would remain in place through the 2022-2023 competition cycle. In 2024, Hayward made their return to the Heart O'North's football group, joined by Ashland after their exit from the Great Northern Conference. They replaced outgoing members Cameron and Chetek-Weyerhaeuser after their exit to associate membership in the Lakeland Conference for football. There are no changes planned for the conference's football roster during the 2026-2027 cycle.

== List of member schools ==
=== Current full members ===
School	Location	Affiliation	Enrollment	Mascot	Colors	Joined
Ashland	Ashland, WI	Public	589	Oredockers		2021
Barron	Barron, WI	Public	302	Golden Bears		1928
Cameron	Cameron, WI	Public	301	Comets		1928, 2019
Cumberland	Cumberland, WI	Public	276	Beavers		1928
Hayward	Hayward, WI	Public	570	Hurricanes		1946
Ladysmith	Ladysmith, WI	Public	247	Lumberjacks		1928
Northwestern	Maple, WI	Public	386	Tigers		1974
Spooner	Spooner, WI	Public	334	Rails		1928
St. Croix Falls	St. Croix Falls, WI	Public	328	Saints		2021
Unity	Balsam Lake, WI	Public	269	Eagles		2025

=== Current associate members ===
School	Location	Affiliation	Mascot	Colors	Primary Conference	Sport(s)
Bloomer	Bloomer, WI	Public	Blackhawks		Cloverbelt	Football
Chetek-Weyerhaeuser	Chetek, WI	Public	Bulldogs		Dunn-St. Croix	Girls Golf
Flambeau	Tony, WI	Public	Bears		Lakeland	Girls Golf
Grantsburg	Grantsburg, WI	Public	Pirates		Lakeland	Girls Golf
Superior	Superior, WI	Public	Spartans		Lake Superior (MSHSL)	Girls Golf
Washburn	Washburn, WI	Public	Castle Guards		Northern Lights	Boys Soccer, Girls Soccer

=== Former members ===
School	Location	Affiliation	Mascot	Colors	Joined	Left	Conference Joined	Current Conference
Bloomer	Bloomer, WI	Public	Blackhawks		1928, 1994	1989, 2021	Middle Border, Cloverbelt	Cloverbelt
Chetek	Chetek, WI	Public	Bulldogs		1928, 1957	1934, 2010	Lakeland	Closed (merged into Chetek-Weyerhaeuser)
Chetek-Weyerhaeuser	Chetek, WI	Public	Bulldogs		2010	2025	Dunn-St. Croix	
Clayton	Clayton, WI	Public	Bears		1928	1934	Upper St. Croix Valley	Lakeland
New Auburn	New Auburn, WI	Public	Trojans		1929	1934	Lakeland	
Rice Lake	Rice Lake, WI	Public	Warriors		1928	1989	Big Rivers	
Shell Lake	Shell Lake, WI	Public	Lakers		1928	1934	Lakeland	
Turtle Lake	Turtle Lake, WI	Public	Lakers		1929	1934	Lakeland	

== Membership map ==
Heart O'North Conference
Location of Heart O'North Conference full members:
1 Ashland
2 Barron
3 Cameron
4 Cumberland
5 Hayward
6 Ladysmith
7 Northwestern
8 Spooner
9 St. Croix Falls
10 Unity

== Sponsored sports ==
	Baseball	Boys Basketball	Girls Basketball	Boys Cross Country	Girls Cross Country	Football	Boys Golf	Girls Golf	Boys Soccer	Girls Soccer	Softball	Boys Track & Field	Girls Track & Field	Girls Volleyball	Boys Wrestling	Girls Wrestling
Ashland	●	●	●	●	●	●	●	●	● (Note: Co-operative with Drummond)	●	●	●	●	●	●	●
Barron	●	●	●	●	●	●	●	●	●	● (Note: Co-operative with Cumberland)	●	●	●	●	●	●
Cameron	●	●	●	●	●		●	●			●	●	●	●	●	●
Cumberland	●	●	●	●	●	●	●	●	●		●	●	●	●	●	●
Hayward	●	●	●	●	●	● (Note: Co-operative with Lac Courte Oreilles)	●	●	●	●	●	●	●	●	● (Note: Co-operative with Northwood)	●
Ladysmith	● (Note: Co-operative with Bruce)	●	●	●	●		●	●				●	●	●	●	●
Northwestern	●	●	●	●	●	●	●	●			●	●	●	●	●	●
Spooner	●	●	●	●	●	●	●	●	● (Note: Co-operative with Shell Lake)	●	●	●	●	●	● (Note: Co-operative with Webster)	●
St. Croix Falls	●	●	●	●	●	●	●	●			●	●	●	●	●	●
Unity	●	●	●	●	●		●	● (Note: Co-operative with Frederic and Luck)	● (Note: Co-operative with St. Croix Falls)		●	●	●	●	●	●

== List of state champions ==
=== Fall sports ===
Boys Cross Country
School	Year	Division
Chetek	1982	Class C
Chetek	1983	Class C

Football
School	Year	Division
Rice Lake	1979	Division 3
Hayward	1987	Division 3
Northwestern	1988	Division 3

Girls Volleyball
School	Year	Division
Barron	1982	Class B
St. Croix Falls	2023	Division 3
Barron	2024	Division 3

=== Winter sports ===
Boys Basketball
School	Year	Division
Ladysmith	2003	Division 3

Girls Basketball
School	Year	Division
Hayward	2016	Division 3

=== Spring sports ===
Baseball
School	Year	Division
Barron	1979	Class B
St. Croix Falls	2023	Division 3

Softball
School	Year	Division
Northwestern	1981	Class B

Boys Track & Field
School	Year	Division
Chetek	1984	Class C
Chetek	1985	Class C
Spooner	1991	Division 2

Girls Track & Field
School	Year	Division
Hayward	2014	Division 3
Ladysmith	2026	Division 3

== List of conference champions ==
=== Boys Basketball ===
School	Quantity	Years
Ladysmith	18	1933, 1942, 1951, 1953, 1958, 1959, 1976, 1977, 1978, 1979, 1981, 1992, 1994, 1995, 1997, 2002, 2003, 2011
Bloomer	15	1937, 1939, 1947, 1949, 1950, 1952, 1954, 1955, 1956, 1969, 1989, 1996, 2012, 2017, 2018
Rice Lake	15	1934, 1939, 1940, 1946, 1947, 1948, 1958, 1960, 1961, 1968, 1973, 1974, 1982, 1983, 1988
Barron	14	1932, 1943, 1945, 1962, 1963, 1966, 1967, 1978, 1987, 1991, 1999, 2000, 2013, 2014
Spooner	14	1930, 1935, 1936, 1944, 1980, 1985, 1986, 1990, 1993, 1997, 1998, 2005, 2007, 2008
Cumberland	12	1931, 1932, 1938, 1941, 1943, 1956, 1957, 1964, 1965, 1971, 1972, 2025
Northwestern	10	1984, 2004, 2009, 2010, 2016, 2017, 2019, 2022, 2023, 2026
Hayward	7	1951, 1952, 1959, 2006, 2015, 2017, 2025
Chetek	6	1970, 1972, 1973, 1974, 1975, 2001
Cameron	2	2020, 2024
St. Croix Falls	1	2026
Ashland	0	
Chetek-Weyerhaeuser	0	
Clayton	0	
New Auburn	0	
Shell Lake	0	
Turtle Lake	0	
Unity	0	

=== Girls Basketball ===
School	Quantity	Years
Hayward	20	1980, 1981, 1983, 1986, 1987, 1988, 1991, 1992, 1993, 1994, 2004, 2008, 2009, 2010, 2011, 2016, 2017, 2018, 2025,2026
Bloomer	16	1975, 1976, 1978, 1984, 1985, 1995, 1996, 1999, 2000, 2003, 2004, 2005, 2006, 2016, 2018, 2019
Ladysmith	11	1977, 1978, 1979, 1984, 1996, 1997, 1998, 2012, 2013, 2014, 2022
Barron	7	1975, 1982, 1994, 2001, 2002, 2007, 2008
Cameron	2	2025, 2026
Northwestern	2	1999, 2020
St. Croix Falls	2	2023, 2024
Chetek	1	1990
Rice Lake	1	1989
Ashland	0	
Chetek-Weyerhaeuser	0	
Cumberland	0	
Spooner	0	
Unity	0	

=== Football ===
School	Quantity	Years
Bloomer	28	1933, 1934, 1935, 1937, 1944, 1949, 1950, 1951, 1952, 1953, 1954, 1955, 1956, 1960, 1963, 1967, 1968, 1969, 1977, 1984, 1986, 1987, 2002, 2005, 2011, 2013, 2014, 2017
Rice Lake	22	1930, 1932, 1936, 1938, 1939, 1942, 1943, 1945, 1946, 1947, 1957, 1959, 1966, 1972, 1975, 1976, 1979, 1980, 1981, 1982, 1983, 1985
Northwestern	18	1987, 1988, 1993, 1997, 1999, 2000, 2004, 2009, 2010, 2015, 2016, 2018, 2019, 2021, 2022, 2023, 2025, 2026
Ladysmith	11	1929, 1932, 1940, 1948, 1958, 1961, 1962, 1964, 2001, 2003, 2006
Spooner	9	1931, 1935, 1941, 1945, 1970, 1973, 1991, 1992, 1996
Cumberland	6	1945, 1958, 1978, 1998, 2012, 2020
Hayward	5	1974, 1987, 2008, 2015, 2016
Barron	4	1965, 1971, 1989, 1990
Cameron	1	2023
Chetek	1	2007
Chetek-Weyerhaeuser	1	2016
St. Croix Falls	1	2024
Ashland	0	
