= Eugene Aldrich =

American football and basketball coach (1898–1959)

Biographical details
- Born: April 20, 1898; Saint Paul, Minnesota, U.S.
- Died: February 26, 1959 (aged 60)
- Education: Illinois (1923)

Coaching career (HC unless noted)

Football
- 1923: Ashland School District (WI)
- 1924: Saint John's (MN)

Basketball
- 1924–1925: Saint John's (MN)

Head coaching record
- Overall: 1–4–1 (college football); 6–8 (college basketball)

Eugene Elliott Aldrich (April 20, 1898 – February 26, 1959) was an American football and basketball coach. He served as the head football coach at Saint John's University in Collegeville, Minnesota in 1924, compiling a record of 1–4–1. He was also the head basketball coach at for the 1924–25 season, tallying a mark of 6–8

== Head coaching record ==
=== College football ===
| Year | Team | Overall | Conference | Standing | Bowl/playoffs |
|---|---|---|---|---|---|
Saint John's Johnnies (Minnesota Intercollegiate Athletic Conference) (1924)
| 1924 | Saint John's | 1–4–1 | 0–4–1 | 8th | |
| Saint John's: | | 1–4–1 | 0–4–1 | | |
| Total: | | 1–4–1 | | | |
