= Lake Superior Conference =

Minnesota high school athletic conference

The Lake Superior Conference is a high school athletic conference with its membership centered around the Twin Ports region at the mouth of the Saint Louis River in Lake Superior. It was founded in 1939 and its member schools belong to the Minnesota State High School League and Wisconsin Interscholastic Athletic Association.

== History ==
=== 1939-1974 ===
Location of Original Big Six Conference Members:

The Lake Superior Conference was formed in 1939, and it was originally known as the Big Six Conference to reflect the number of its original member schools (Cloquet, Denfeld, Duluth Central, Morgan Park, Proctor and Two Harbors). At the time of the Big Six Conference's formation, all of its members also belonged to the Head of the Lakes Conference, which included Duluth Cathedral and three high schools across the Saint Louis River in Wisconsin (Superior Cathedral, Superior Central and Superior East). After a short hiatus from 1946 to 1948, the Big Six resumed competition and changed its name as the conference grew; becoming the Big Seven in 1951 (Duluth East), the Big Eight in 1954 (Grand Marais), the Big Nine in 1958 (Silver Bay) and finally, the Big Ten in 1962 (Hermantown). The Big Ten Conference maintained its member roster until 1974, when Duluth Cathedral joined the conference, and the conference changed its name to the Lake Superior Conference due to there being more than ten member schools.

=== 1974-present ===
After the conference's name change, the Lake Superior Conference stayed at eleven schools until 1982, when Morgan Park closed its doors and merged into Denfeld. The school became known as Denfeld-Morgan Park for one school year before reverting to the original Denfeld name in 1983. The next year, the Lake Superior Conference accepted its first ever Wisconsin-based member in Superior High School. Membership in the Lake Superior Conference remained stable for sixteen years until in 1999, four schools (Duluth Central, Duluth East, Silver Bay and Superior) left the conference; Silver Bay joined the Polar League and the other three schools became independents. Prior to the exit of these four schools, the members of the conference voted to disband following the 1999-2000 season, citing disparities in enrollment and competition levels. In 2000, the members of the Lake Superior Conference decided not to disband and two schools made their return: Duluth Central and Superior. Their entry into the Lake Superior Conference offset the loss of Cook County to independent status. In 2006, Two Harbors left to join the Polar League and were replaced by Ashland, who had just left the WIAA's Lumberjack Conference. In preparation for the closing of Duluth Central High School, the athletic programs at Central and Denfeld merged in 2010, initially competing under the Central banner before reverting to Denfield after the two schools merged in 2011. Ashland left the Lake Superior Conference to compete as an independent for the 2020-21 school year prior to joining the WIAA's Heart O'North Conference. They were replaced by Grand Rapids, who previously competed as an independent after leaving the Iron Range Conference in 2019. They were followed by Hibbing in 2021, who left the Iron Range in 2020 and brought the Lake Superior Conference to its current tally of eight member schools.

=== Football (1958-1977) ===
Football was sponsored for the first time with Silver Bay's entry into the Big Nine in 1958, and all nine schools participated with the conference's first season. Membership was split into two divisions: the four Duluth schools were placed in the City Division and the other five became the Seaway Division. Hermantown joined the Seaway Division for football when it entered the conference for all other sports in 1962. For the 1966 season, Cloquet was shifted over to join with the Duluth schools, and the City Division was renamed the Zenith Division. Duluth Cathedral joined the football roster in 1974, competing in the Zenith Division for the final four seasons of football sponsorship. The Lake Superior Conference discontinued sponsorship of football after the 1977 season as part of a larger realignment of football schools in the Iron Range. All six Zenith Division schools joined with Grand Rapids and Hibbing to form the Northern Lakes Conference, four schools in the Seaway Division (Hermantown, Proctor, Silver Bay and Two Harbors) partnered with five former Iron Range Conference schools (Aurora-Hoyt Lakes, Eveleth, Greenway, International Falls and Virginia) in the new Sea-Range Conference, and Grand Marais became members of the Arrowhead Conference.

== List of conference members ==
=== Current members ===
School	Location	Affiliation	Enrollment	Mascot	Colors	Joined
Cloquet	Cloquet, MN	Public	662	Lumberjacks		1939
Denfeld	Duluth, MN	Public	729	Hunters		1939, 2011
Grand Rapids	Grand Rapids, MN	Public	953	Thunderhawks		2020
Hermantown	Hermantown, MN	Public	618	Hawks		1962
Hibbing	Hibbing, MN	Public	564	Bluejackets		2021
Marshall School	Duluth, MN	Private (Nonsectarian)	232	Hilltoppers		1974
Proctor	Proctor, MN	Public	472	Rails		1939
Superior	Superior, WI	Public	1,308	Spartans		1983, 2000

=== Former members ===
School	Location	Affiliation	Enrollment	Mascot	Colors	Joined	Left	Conference Joined	Current Conference
Duluth Central	Duluth, MN	Public	N/A	Trojans		1939, 2000	1999, 2011	Independent	Closed (merged into Denfeld)
Morgan Park	Duluth, MN	Public	N/A	Wildcats		1939	1982	Closed (merged into Denfeld)	
Two Harbors	Two Harbors, MN	Public	290	Agates		1939	2006	Polar League	
Duluth East	Duluth, MN	Public	1,358	Greyhounds		1951	1999	Independent	
Cook County	Grand Marais, MN	Public	137	Vikings		1954	2000	Independent	Polar League
Silver Bay	Silver Bay, MN	Public	91	Mariners		1958	1999	Polar League	
Ashland	Ashland, WI	Public	635	Oredockers		2006	2020	Independent	Heart O'North

== Membership timeline ==
=== Football members ===
City/Zenith Division Seaway Division

== Membership map ==
Lake Superior Conference
Location of Lake Superior Conference full members:
1 Cloquet
2 Denfeld
3 Grand Rapids
4 Hermantown
5 Hibbing
6 Marshall School
7 Proctor
8 Superior

== List of state champions ==
=== Fall sports ===
Boys Cross Country
School	Year	Organization	Division
Duluth Central	1943	MSHSL	
Duluth Central	1945	MSHSL	
Duluth Central	1949	MSHSL	
Duluth Central	1951	MSHSL	
Duluth Central	1956	MSHSL	
Duluth Central	1957	MSHSL	
Esko/Cloquet	1984	MSHSL	Class AA
Esko/Cloquet	1985	MSHSL	Class AA

Girls Cross Country
School	Year	Organization	Division
Hermantown	1984	MSHSL	Class A
Hermantown	1985	MSHSL	Class A
Duluth East	1992	MSHSL	Class AA
Duluth East	1993	MSHSL	Class AA
Duluth East	1994	MSHSL	Class AA
Duluth East	1995	MSHSL	Class AA
Duluth East	1996	MSHSL	Class AA
Duluth East	1997	MSHSL	Class AA
Duluth East	1998	MSHSL	Class AA

Boys Soccer
School	Year	Organization	Division
Marshall School	2007	MSHSL	Class A
Ashland	2013	WIAA	Division 3

Girls Volleyball
School	Year	Organization	Division
Hermantown	1976	MSHSL	Class A

=== Winter sports ===
Boys Alpine Skiing
School	Year	Organization
Duluth Central	1943	MSHSL
Duluth Central	1944	MSHSL
Cloquet	1945	MSHSL
Duluth Central	1946	MSHSL
Duluth Central	1947	MSHSL
Cloquet	1948	MSHSL
Duluth Central	1949	MSHSL
Cloquet	1950	MSHSL
Cloquet	1951	MSHSL
Cloquet	1952	MSHSL
Duluth East	1953	MSHSL
Duluth East	1954	MSHSL
Duluth East	1956	MSHSL
Cloquet	1957	MSHSL
Grand Marais	1958	MSHSL
Grand Marais	1959	MSHSL
Duluth East	1960	MSHSL
Duluth East	1961	MSHSL
Grand Marais	1962	MSHSL
Grand Marais	1963	MSHSL
Grand Marais	1964	MSHSL
Grand Marais	1965	MSHSL
Grand Marais	1966	MSHSL
Cloquet	1968	MSHSL
Grand Marais	1969	MSHSL
Grand Marais	1970	MSHSL
Duluth East	1985	MSHSL
Duluth East	1990	MSHSL
Duluth East	1991	MSHSL
Duluth East	1994	MSHSL
Duluth East	1995	MSHSL

Girls Alpine Skiing
School	Year	Organization
Cloquet	1977	MSHSL
Duluth East	1983	MSHSL
Duluth East	1994	MSHSL
Duluth East	1995	MSHSL
Hermantown	2012	MSHSL

Boys Basketball
School	Year	Organization	Division
Denfeld	1947	MSHSL	
Duluth Central	1950	MSHSL	
Duluth Central	1961	MSHSL	
Duluth Central	1971	MSHSL	Class AA
Duluth Central	1979	MSHSL	Class AA

Boys Hockey
School	Year	Organization	Division
Duluth East	1960	MSHSL	
Superior	1990	WIAA	
Superior	1992	WIAA	
Superior	1994	WIAA	
Duluth East	1995	MSHSL	Class AA
Superior	1995	WIAA	
Superior	1996	WIAA	
Duluth East	1998	MSHSL	Class AA
Superior	2003	WIAA	
Superior	2005	WIAA	
Hermantown	2007	MSHSL	Class A
Superior	2015	WIAA	
Hermantown	2016	MSHSL	Class A
Hermantown	2017	MSHSL	Class A
Hermantown	2022	MSHSL	Class A

Girls Hockey
School	Year	Organization	Division
Superior	2005	WIAA	
Proctor/ Hermantown	2021	MSHSL	Class A

Boys Nordic Skiing
School	Year	Organization
Duluth Central	1940	MSHSL
Duluth Central	1941	MSHSL
Duluth Central	1942	MSHSL
Duluth Central	1943	MSHSL
Duluth Central	1944	MSHSL
Duluth Central	1945	MSHSL
Duluth Central	1946	MSHSL
Duluth Central	1947	MSHSL
Cloquet	1948	MSHSL
Duluth Central	1949	MSHSL
Duluth Central	1950	MSHSL
Cloquet	1951	MSHSL
Cloquet	1952	MSHSL
Duluth Central	1953	MSHSL
Duluth Central	1954	MSHSL
Cloquet	1956	MSHSL
Denfeld	1957	MSHSL
Duluth Central	1958	MSHSL
Cloquet	1959	MSHSL
Cloquet	1960	MSHSL
Duluth Central	1961	MSHSL
Duluth Central	1962	MSHSL
Cloquet	1963	MSHSL
Cloquet	1966	MSHSL
Duluth East	1998	MSHSL
Duluth East	1999	MSHSL

Girls Nordic Skiing
School	Year	Division
Cloquet	1976	MSHSL
Cloquet	1977	MSHSL
Cloquet	1978	MSHSL
Duluth East	1996	MSHSL
Duluth East	1998	MSHSL
Duluth East	1999	MSHSL

=== Spring sports ===
Baseball
School	Year	Organization	Division
Denfeld	1950	MSHSL	
Marshall School	2019	MSHSL	Class AA

Boys Golf
School	Year	Organization	Division
Duluth Central	1946	MSHSL	
Duluth Central	1947	MSHSL	
Duluth Central	1948	MSHSL	
Duluth East	1960	MSHSL	
Duluth East	1968	MSHSL	
Marshall School	2004	MSHSL	Class A
Cloquet	2021	MSHSL	Class AA

Softball
School	Year	Organization	Division
Hermantown	1991	MSHSL	Class A
Hermantown	2002	MSHSL	Class AA
Hermantown	2009	MSHSL	Class AA

Boys Track & Field
School	Year	Organization	Division
Denfeld	1949	MSHSL	
Silver Bay	1977	MSHSL	Class A
Hermantown	2005	MSHSL	Class A

== List of conference champions ==
=== Boys Basketball ===
School	Quantity	Years
Duluth Central	22	1949, 1950, 1951, 1952, 1955, 1957, 1961, 1963, 1967, 1968, 1971, 1977, 1978, 1979, 1982, 1986, 1988, 1989, 1993, 1994, 1997, 1998
Superior	17	1990, 1991, 1996, 2003, 2006, 2007, 2008, 2009, 2010, 2011, 2013, 2015, 2016, 2017, 2020, 2022, 2024
Duluth East	16	1956, 1957, 1966, 1970, 1972, 1973, 1975, 1977, 1980, 1981, 1982, 1987, 1991, 1992, 1995, 1996
Cloquet	15	1958, 1959, 1960, 1962, 1963, 1965, 1969, 1976, 1983, 1984, 1985, 1999, 2000, 2014, 2021
Denfeld	13	1944, 1946, 1952, 1954, 1955, 1957, 2001, 2002, 2004, 2012, 2018, 2024, 2025
Two Harbors	11	1940, 1941, 1942, 1943, 1944, 1945, 1970, 1976, 1990, 1991, 1994
Hermantown	6	1965, 1990, 1992, 2019, 2023, 2024
(Grand Marais); Cook County	3	1993, 1999, 2000
Marshall School	2	1995, 2005
Morgan Park	2	1943, 1953
Silver Bay	2	1970, 1974
Proctor	1	1964
Ashland	0	
Duluth Cathedral	0	
Grand Rapids	0	
Hibbing	0	

=== Girls Basketball ===
School	Quantity	Years
Hermantown	12	1991, 1992, 1994, 1996, 1999, 2005, 2006, 2008, 2016, 2017, 2018, 2020
Cloquet	7	1978, 1979, 1990, 1999, 2000, 2004, 2025
Denfeld	6	1977, 1988, 1989, 1992, 1993, 1994
Duluth Central	6	1981, 1983, 1984, 1986, 1987, 1997
Duluth East	6	1977, 1982, 1985, 1991, 1995, 1996
Superior	6	1985, 2007, 2011, 2012, 2013, 2014
Proctor	4	2002, 2003, 2019, 2020
Ashland	3	2009, 2010, 2015
Marshall School	3	1998, 2021, 2024
Two Harbors	3	1993, 1995, 2001
Grand Rapids	2	2022, 2023
Silver Bay	1	1980
(Grand Marais); Cook County	0	
Duluth Cathedral	0	
Hibbing	0	
Morgan Park	0	

=== Football ===
==== City/Zenith Division ====
School	Quantity	Years
Denfeld	7	1958, 1959, 1964, 1966, 1973, 1974, 1977
Cloquet	5	1967, 1971, 1972, 1975, 1976
Duluth Central	4	1961, 1962, 1965, 1968
Morgan Park	3	1963, 1969, 1970
Duluth East	1	1960
Duluth Cathedral	0	

==== Seaway Division ====
School	Quantity	Years
Two Harbors	9	1958, 1960, 1961, 1967, 1968, 1969, 1975, 1976, 1977
Hermantown	4	1964, 1965, 1970, 1972
Cloquet	3	1959, 1960, 1962
Proctor	2	1963, 1971
Silver Bay	2	1973, 1974
Grand Marais	1	1966
