= Ashland High School (Wisconsin) =

Location
- 1900 Beaser Ave; Ashland, Ashland County, Wisconsin 54806-3603
- Coordinates: 46°34′16″N 90°53′02″W

Information
- Type: Public secondary
- Oversight: Ashland School District
- Principal: Brian Trettin
- Staff: 41.07 Classroom teachers (FTE)
- Grades: 9th through 12th
- Enrollment: 609 (2023-2024 school year)
- Team name: Oredockers
- Website: Ashland High School

Ashland High School is a public high school located in Ashland, Wisconsin that serves students from 9th to 12th grade. It is part of the Ashland School District.

== Athletics ==
Ashland High School's athletic teams are known as the Oredockers. This is in reference to the large ore dock that once stood on Ashland's harbor. This name arose in the 1940s; before this, the school's athletic teams were known as the Purgolders.

=== Athletic conference affiliation history ===
- Michigan-Wisconsin Conference (1937-1973)
- Lumberjack Conference (1973-2006)
- Lake Superior Conference (2006-2020)
- Heart O'North Conference (2021-present)

== Notable alumni ==
- Brent Brevak, professional stock car racer
- Robin Greenfield, environmental activist
- Barbara Linton, Wisconsin state legislator
- William Plizka, Wisconsin state legislator
- John Szarkowski, photographer, art curator, and historian
