= Virginia High School =

Virginia High School may refer to:

- Virginia High School (Minnesota), United States
- Virginia High School (Virginia), United States

== See also ==
- Virginia High School League, Virginia, United States
