= Gogebic Range Conference =

Former Michigan high school athletic conference

The Gogebic Range Conference is a former high school athletic conference with most of its members located in the upper peninsula of Michigan and one in Wisconsin. Founded in 1980 and disbanded in 1986, conference members belonged to the Michigan High School Athletic Association and Wisconsin Interscholastic Athletic Association.

== History ==
Location of Gogebic Range Conference Members

The Gogebic Range Conference, named after the region in which its member schools were located, was formed in 1980 by four former members of the Michigan-Wisconsin Conference: Bessemer, Hurley, Ironwood and Wakefield. For the three Michigan-based schools, this was a dual affiliation: Bessemer and Wakefield were part of the Great Western Conference while Ironwood was affiliated with the Superior Six Conference. Hurley's sole affiliation was with the Gogebic Range, as they had left the WIAA's Lumberjack Conference after the 1979-80 school year. The Gogebic Range Conference was disbanded in 1986 after Hurley's exit to become members of the Indianhead Conference of the WIAA. The three Michigan-based schools continued their previous affiliations.

== Conference membership history ==
School	Location	Affiliation	Mascot	Colors	Joined	Left	Conference Joined	Current Conference
Bessemer	Bessemer, MI	Public	Speedboys		1980	1986	Great Western	Independent
Hurley	Hurley, WI	Public	Midgets		1980	1986	Northern Lights (WIAA)	
Ironwood	Ironwood, MI	Public	Red Devils		1980	1986	Superior Six	Independent
Wakefield	Wakefield, MI	Public	Cardinals		1980	1986	Great Western	Independent

== List of conference champions ==
=== Boys Basketball ===
School	Quantity	Years
Hurley	3	1981, 1982, 1983
Ironwood	2	1984, 1985
Bessemer	1	1986
Wakefield		

=== Football ===
School	Quantity	Years
Bessemer	3	1980, 1981, 1985
Ironwood	3	1982, 1983, 1984
Hurley		
Wakefield		
