= Rock Ridge High School (Virginia, Minnesota) =

Location
- 1405 Progress Parkway; Virginia, Minnesota 55792; United States; 47.4808°N 92.5231°W

Information
- School type: Public High school
- Motto: Fiercely United
- Established: 2023
- School district: Rock Ridge Public Schools
- Principal: Scott Manni
- Staff: Approx. 60 FTE
- Grades: 7–12
- Enrollment: ~1200 (2023–2024)
- Student to teacher ratio: 15:1
- Campus: Suburban
- Colors: Green and Black
- Athletics conference: Lake Superior Conference
- Mascot: Wolverines
- Website: rrps.org

Rock Ridge High School is a public secondary school located in Virginia, Minnesota, serving students in grades 7 through 12. It is part of Rock Ridge Public Schools (Independent School District 2909), which was established in 2020 following the consolidation of the Virginia and Eveleth-Gilbert school districts.

== History ==
Rock Ridge High School was established in 2023 as part of a district consolidation between the Virginia and Eveleth-Gilbert school districts, forming Independent School District 2909, known as Rock Ridge Public Schools. A $178 million bond referendum funded the construction of the new facility and related infrastructure.

== Campus and facilities ==
Completed in 2023, Rock Ridge High School was constructed over 30 months at a cost of $122 million. It includes a gymnasium, swimming pool, indoor walking track, synthetic turf field, and designated areas for trade, health care, and culinary instruction. The design incorporates natural lighting and materials intended to reflect the surrounding region.

== Design recognition ==
In 2024, Rock Ridge High School received a Minnesota Construction Association Award of Excellence, citing the facility's architectural design and community-based planning approach. In 2025, the school was named a finalist for the James D. MacConnell Award from the Association for Learning Environments, recognizing its integration of educational planning, architecture, and community engagement.

== Academics and career programs ==
Rock Ridge High School follows a career academy model that includes pathways in health care, construction, culinary arts, and business. Students have participated in applied learning projects, including the construction of skids for ice houses and local infrastructure improvements.

== Sustainability and environmental design ==
Rock Ridge High School was designed with regenerative and sustainable practices, including net-zero ready energy goals, low-emission materials, and preserved natural habitat on-site. Approximately 15–25% of the school site was maintained for ecological purposes, and less than one acre of wetlands was disturbed during construction. The building uses operable windows, daylighting strategies, and low-VOC materials to support air quality and thermal comfort.

== Pedagogical approach and learning environment ==
The school's learning environment was structured around the development of future-ready skills. Spatial design was informed by stakeholder workshops and organized into flexible zones such as Learning Labs, Plazas, Think Tanks, and Maker Spaces. This layout supports a range of instructional methods, from independent study to group collaboration. Movable partitions, adaptable furniture, and integrated technology allow for reconfiguration based on curricular needs.

== Cultural and regional identity ==
Design elements throughout the school were intentionally tied to the geography and heritage of the Iron Range. Interior color schemes reflect regional landscapes, with the lower level inspired by lakes, the second floor by forests, and the upper floor by the sky. The Performing Arts Center incorporates forms and materials that reference iron mining and local industry. These elements contribute to a shared cultural identity and community use of the building.

== Community and media attention ==
Regional media outlets have reported on Rock Ridge High School since its opening, covering the building's design features and student-led initiatives. Coverage has included public tours and academic programs in construction and trades education.
