= 2025 Little All-America college football team =

The 2025 Little All-America college football team is composed of college football players from Division II, III, and NAIA schools who were selected by the Associated Press (AP) as the best players at each position. Each division has had a separate All-America team named by the AP since 2017.

== NCAA Division II First team ==
Position	Player	Team
Offense
Quarterback	Jack Strand	Minnesota State–Moorhead
Running back	Curtis Allen	Virginia Union
Running back	Andrew Miller	Harding
Wide receiver	TJ Chukwurah	Black Hills State
Wide receiver	Gage Florence	Minnesota State–Moorhead
Wide receiver	Reggie Retzlaff	Colorado State–Pueblo
Tight end	Luke Dehnicke	Minnesota–Duluth
Offensive line	Tim Anderson	Ferris State
Offensive line	Joe Cooper	Slippery Rock
Offensive line	Montriel Lee	Central Oklahoma
Offensive line	Jake Mitchell	Harding
Offensive line	Avery Swinton	Catawba
Defense
Defensive line	Kenyon Garner	Livingstone
Defensive line	Israel Nwokocha	Benedict
Defensive line	Ean Rhea	Emory & Henry
Defensive line	Michael Shimek	Ashland
Linebacker	Landon Boss	Emporia State
Linebacker	Ja’Kobe Clinton	West Florida
Linebacker	Tristan Exline	UT–Permian Basin
Defensive back	Marvelous Owens	Northeastern State
Defensive back	Justin Payoute	Ferris State
Defensive back	Jordan Rogers	Pittsburg State
Defensive back	Darnell Stephens	Fort Valley State
Special Teams
Kicker	Manaki Watanabe	Ashland
Punter	Brodie Eisenbraun	Chadron State
Return specialist	Tye Roberson	Lenoir-Rhyne
All-purpose	JayJay Jordan	Slippery Rock

== NCAA Division III First team ==
Position	Player	Team
Offense
Quarterback	Kaleb Blaha	Wisconsin–River Falls
Running back	Montie Quinn	Curry
Running back	Isaiah Simmons	Brockport
Wide receiver	Thomas Skokna	North Central (IL)
Wide receiver	Robby Ballentine	DePauw
Wide receiver	Albert Rundell	Bethel
Tight end	Reed Breckheimer	Carroll
Offensive line	Michael Nwosu	Johns Hopkins
Offensive line	Giovanni Kennedy	Mount Union
Offensive line	Cortez Jones	North Central (IL)
Offensive line	Caleb Bayer	Trinity
Offensive line	Quentin Lehman	Ohio Northern
Defense
Defensive line	John Sullivan	North Central (IL)
Defensive line	Zach Frank	St. John's
Defensive line	Michael Clark	Berry
Defensive line	Kaleb Brown	Mount Union
Linebacker	Gage Timm	Wisconsin–River Falls
Linebacker	Daniel Eliasek	Randolph-Macon
Linebacker	Keenan Tyler	Wartburg
Linebacker	Aden Wiser	Cortland
Defensive back	Rahmareon Roby	North Central (IL)
Defensive back	Devin Williams	Bethel
Defensive back	Carson Bourdo	Johns Hopkins
Defensive back	Dylan Connors	Wesleyan
Defensive back	Gavin Smith	Central
Special Teams
Kicker	Dominic Bourgeois	Susquehanna
Punter	Chase Lanham	Southwestern
Long snapper	PJ Pollock	Susquehanna
All-purpose/returner	B.J. Stewart	Mary Hardin-Baylor

== NAIA First team ==
Position	Player	Team
Offense
Quarterback	Zach Chevalier	Morningside
Running back	Destynd Loring	William Penn
Running back	Davontaye Saunders	Lindsey Wilson
Wide receiver	Drew Sellon	Morningside
Wide receiver	Isaac Smith	Indiana Wesleyan
Wide receiver	Matthew Holthusen	Southwestern
Tight end	Carson Ochoa	Carroll
Offensive line	Rashad Beckham	Benedictine
Offensive line	Tyler Carlson	Keiser
Offensive line	Jacob Graves	Montana Tech
Offensive line	Logan Penhollow	Indiana Wesleyan
Offensive line	Kyree Watkins	Friends
Defense
Defensive line	Thomas Ibrahim	Southeastern
Defensive line	Zach Myers	Evangel
Defensive line	Tyler Walker	Montana Western
Defensive line	A.J. Knox	Siena Heights
Linebacker	Terry Elias Jr.	St. Xavier
Linebacker	John Argo	Grand View
Linebacker	Hunter Zirkle	Cumberlands
Defensive back	Kylon Polk	Louisiana Christian
Defensive back	Logan Carrington	Marian
Defensive back	Isaiah Hasten	Benedictine
Defensive back	Braeden Orlandi	Carroll
Defensive back	Vincie Solano	Indiana Wesleyan
Special Teams
Kicker	Truitt Bosher	Friends
Punter	Drew Rader	Georgetown
All-purpose	Levi Torgerson	Montana Tech

== See also ==
- 2025 College Football All-America Team
