= Luke Dehnicke =

American football player

No. 84 – Northwestern Wildcats
- Position: Tight end
- Class: Redshirt Sophomore

Personal information
- Listed height: 6 ft 6 in (1.98 m)
- Listed weight: 240 lb (109 kg)

Career information
- High school: Andover (Andover, Minnesota)
- College: Minnesota Duluth (2024–2025); Northwestern (2026–present)

Awards and highlights
- First-team D-II All-American (2025)
- Stats at ESPN

Luke Dehnicke is an American college football tight end for the Northwestern Wildcats. He previously played for the Minnesota Duluth Bulldogs.

== Early life ==
Dehnicke attended Andover High School in Andover, Minnesota. He was named All-Conference, All-State, and All-Metro his senior year. He committed to the University of Minnesota Duluth to play college football.

== College career ==
Dehnicke redshirted his first year at Minnesota Deluth in 2024. As a redshirt freshman in 2025, he had 61 receptions for 1,119 receiving yards with 14 touchdowns and was named the NSIC Offensive Newcomer of the Year and a Division II All-American. After the season, he entered the transfer portal and committed to Northwestern University. In the third game of the season against the Indiana Hoosiers, he had seven receptions for 140 yards.
