= Rock Ridge Public Schools =

School district in Minnesota, United States

Address
- 1405 Progress Parkway Virginia, Minnesota, 55792; United States

District information
- Mottoes: Fiercely United
- Grades: PK–12
- Established: 2020
- Superintendent: Dr. Noel Schmidt
- Chair of the board: John Uhan
- Schools: 4
- District ID: MN-012909

Students and staff
- Students: 2,406
- Faculty: 326
- Teachers: 76
- Student–teacher ratio: 15:1
- Athletic conference: Lake Superior
- District mascot: Wolverines
- Colors: Green and Black

Other information
- Website: rrps.org

Rock Ridge Public Schools is a public school district located in St. Louis County, Minnesota, serving the communities of Virginia and Eveleth, as well as surrounding areas. The district, officially designated as Independent School District 2909 (ISD 2909), was formed through the consolidation of the former Virginia and Eveleth-Gilbert school districts.

The district was established in 2020, with construction on a new joint high school—Rock Ridge High School—beginning that same year. The new facility opened to students in fall 2023, marking the full unification of the high school student bodies. The district serves approximately 2,400 students across four schools and is led by Superintendent Dr. Noel Schmidt. The district's mascot is the Wolverine, and its motto is "Fiercely United."

== Schools ==
=== High school ===
- Rock Ridge High School (grades 7–12)

=== Elementary schools ===
- Parkview Elementary School (Virginia) – grades PreK–2
- Laurentian Elementary School (Eveleth) – grades PreK–6
- North Star Elementary School (Virginia) – grades 3–6

=== Former high schools ===
- Virginia High School – formerly Virginia Secondary, served grades 7–12 until closing in 2023. The building was demolished and replaced with North Star Elementary.
- Eveleth-Gilbert High School – served grades 7–12 before closing in 2023 as part of the consolidation.

== History ==
The formation of Rock Ridge Public Schools began with a consolidation effort between the Virginia and Eveleth-Gilbert Public Schools districts. The initiative was formally approved in 2020, creating a new unified district under the designation Independent School District 2909 (ISD 2909). The name “Rock Ridge” was selected as a nod to the region's mining heritage and the area's natural geography. Groundbreaking for the new Rock Ridge High School took place on August 5, 2020. Designed to serve grades 7 through 12, the high school officially opened to students in the fall of 2023, consolidating secondary students from the former Virginia and Eveleth-Gilbert high schools into one building. According to Superintendent Dr. Noel Schmidt, the new facility would be “the most impressive school north of St. Cloud.” The 2022–2023 school year marked the final year for both Virginia Secondary and Eveleth-Gilbert High School. Following their closure, both buildings were demolished. Virginia Secondary was replaced with the newly constructed North Star Elementary School, which now serves students in grades 3 through 6.

In preparation for the district merger, several athletic programs were unified beginning in 2021, including track and field, swimming, tennis, girls' golf, and girls' hockey. Full athletic consolidation occurred with the opening of Rock Ridge High School, along with the debut of the new Wolverine mascot and district branding.

== Athletics ==
Rock Ridge High School competes in the Minnesota State High School League (MSHSL) and is a member of the Lake Superior Conference. Athletic programming spans all three seasons and includes co-ops with neighboring districts such as Mesabi East High School for select sports.

- Fall Sports
  - Football
  - Volleyball
  - Girl's Tennis
  - Boy’s and Girl’s Cross Country
  - Girl’s Swimming
  - Boy’s and Girl’s Soccer
  - Fall Trap
- Winter Sports
  - Dance Team
  - Alpine Skiing
  - Nordic Skiing
  - Wrestling
  - Girl’s Basketball
  - Boy’s Basketball
  - Girl’s Hockey
  - Boy’s Hockey
  - Boy’s Swimming & Diving
- Spring Sports
  - Baseball
  - Softball
  - Boy’s and Girl’s Track & Field
  - Boy’s and Girl’s Golf
  - Boy’s Tennis
  - Spring Trap

The boy’s and girl’s hockey programs play at the Iron Trail Motors Event Center in Virginia. The Rock Ridge boy’s hockey team began official competition in 2021–2022 and includes players from cooperative agreements with Mountain Iron-Buhl and Mesabi East.
