= Robin Greenfield =

American activist

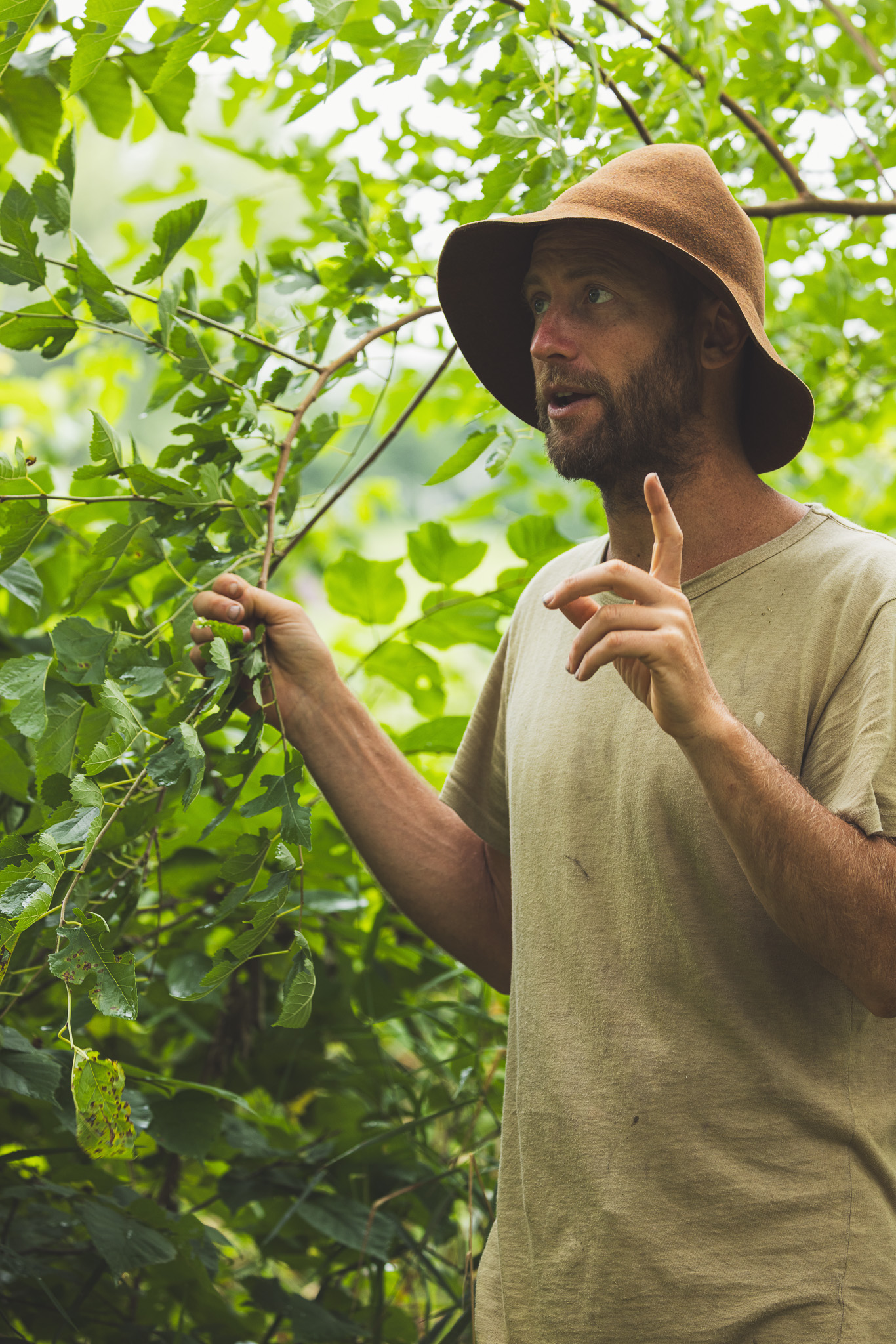
- Greenfield in 2026
- Born: Robin Greenfield; August 28, 1986 (age 40); Ashland, Wisconsin, U.S.
- Education: University of Wisconsin–La Crosse (BS)
- Occupation: Environmental activist
- Years active: 2013–present
- Website: robingreenfield.org

Robin Greenfield (born August 28, 1986), formerly known as Rob Greenfield, is an American environmental activist. He is known for raising awareness for sustainability issues, often through attention-grabbing tactics.

== Early life and education ==
Greenfield was born and raised in Ashland, Wisconsin. His mother, who raised him and his three siblings alone, was a non-practicing Jew who was part of the Hare Krishna movement. At the age of 18, he became an Eagle Scout.

After graduating from Ashland High School, Greenfield attended the University of Wisconsin–La Crosse, graduating with a Bachelor of Science degree in biology. He traveled to six continents throughout his time in university and upon graduation.

== Career ==
In 2011, Greenfield relocated to San Diego, California, where he founded a successful advertising business.

Greenfield originally aspired to be a millionaire by age 30 before the anti-consumerist film The Story of Stuff inspired him to pursue a minimalist lifestyle.

=== Environmental activism ===
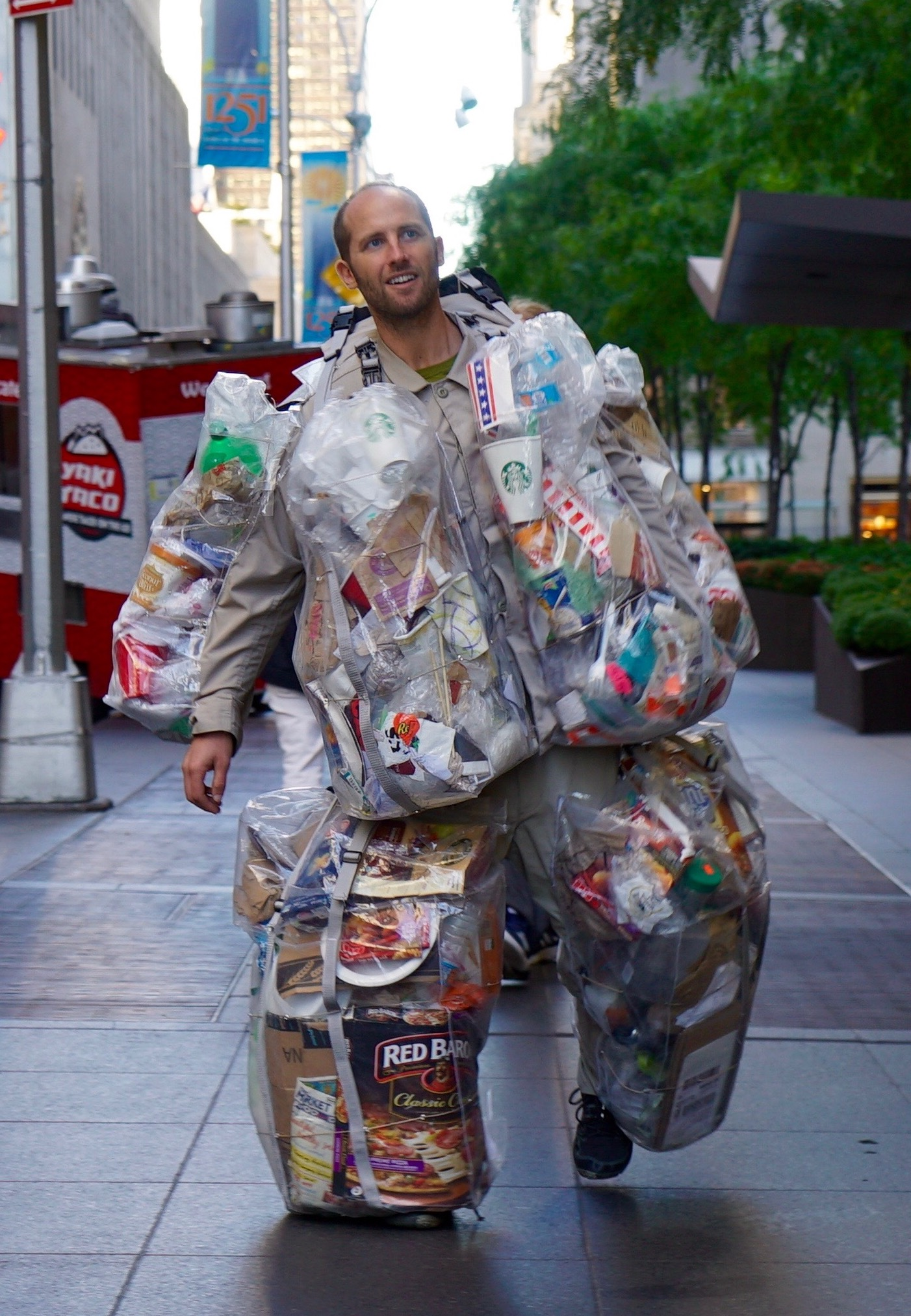
Greenfield during Trash Me campaign in 2016

In 2013, Greenfield cycled 4,700 miles (7,600 km) across America on a bicycle made of bamboo. On the 104-day ride he used 160 US gallons (610 L) of water, created two pounds (0.9 kg) of trash, traveled via his own power except for one mile (1.6 km) on a ferry into New York City, plugged into five electrical outlets, and never turned on a light switch. About 70 percent of his diet came from dumpsters—he ate more than 280 pounds (130 kg) of food from grocery store dumpsters to bring attention to food waste.

From April 2013 to April 2014, Greenfield spent a year bathing only in natural water sources such as rivers, lakes, waterfalls, and in the rain to raise awareness about consumption, water conservation, and living simply.

Greenfield cycled across the US for the second time in the summer of 2014. He aimed eat solely by dumpster diving at grocery stores and convenience stores to draw attention to and find solutions for food waste. The purpose of the campaign was to get grocery stores to donate the food they would otherwise throw away.

In September 2015, Greenfield embarked on a journey across South America with no money. The trip was filmed by documentarian James Levelle for Discovery Channel. The mini-series was six episodes and aired on in May 2016.

In October 2016, Greenfield spent a month in New York City wearing all the trash he produced during the month on his body by storing the trash in a suit with clear plastic pockets, designed by trashion designer Nancy Judd.

From November 2018 to November 2019, Greenfield lived in Orlando, Florida, and ate only food that he could grow and forage. He grew over 100 different foods in gardens and foraged more than 200 foods from the wild, using skills he learned from local teachers.

Greenfield released a self-titled short documentary film, Greenfield, in 2026. The film culminates in a coastal walk from the Canadian border to Los Angeles' Griffith Park to begin a 90-day experiment in non-ownership, living on borrowed items from followers and foraged food from his surroundings.

== Personal life ==
Greenfield travels barefoot and wears homemade clothing. Greenfield has referred to Rosenberg's Nonviolent Communication as his "Bible". Greenfield does not use credit cards or government-issued ID.

Greenfield dated Cheryl Davies, a student of Traditional Asian medicine. They split due to the demands of his lifestyle and her family's resistance to his "uncompromising nature."

Greenfield has stated that he believes he has autism, but he has not been diagnosed.

== Books ==
- Greenfield, Robin (2016). Dude Making a Difference: Bamboo Bikes, Dumpster Dives and Other Extreme Adventures Across America. Gabriola Island, BC: New Society Publishers. ISBN 9780865718074.
- Greenfield, Robin (2022). Zero Waste Kids: Hands-On Projects and Activities to Reduce, Reuse, and Recycle. Beverly, MA: Quarry Books, The Quarto Group. ISBN 9781631599415.
- Greenfield, Robin; Banyard, Antonia (2022). Be the Change: Robin Greenfield's Call to Kids—Making a Difference in a Messed-Up World. Vancouver: Greystone Books. ISBN 9781771645935.
- Greenfield, Robin (2024). Food Freedom: A Year of Growing and Foraging 100% of My Food. Robin Press. ISBN 9798350732283.
