= Hurley School District =

School district in Wisconsin, United States

The Hurley School District is a school district located in Kimball, Wisconsin, serving the area around the city of Hurley in the northern portions of Iron County, Wisconsin.

The school district consists of a single school building, located on Range View Drive. Both Hurley Elementary and Hurley High operate on that site.

== History ==
The $7 million Hurley K-12 School was originally built in 1991 to combine the J.E. Murphy High School, South Side Elementary and St. Mary's Catholic School all in Hurley, and Roosevelt Elementary School in Montreal.

In August 2006, the district's five-member school board unanimously agreed that the school grounds should be annexed to the City of Hurley.

== Areas served by the Hurley School District ==
- City of Hurley
- City of Montreal
- Carey
- Gile
- Gurney
- Iron Belt
- Oma
- Pence
- Saxon
- Upson

== Athletics ==
Hurley's athletic mascot was the Midget until early 2019, when after a community search the teams were renamed the Northstars. and its colors are Orange and Black. In 1995, the Midgets football team appeared in the WIAA's Division 5 state championship, losing to Darlington with a score of 63–6.

=== Athletic conference affiliation history ===
- Range League (1919-1937)
- Michigan-Wisconsin Conference (1937-1973)
- Lumberjack Conference (1973-1980)
- Gogebic Range Conference (1980-1986)
- Indianhead Conference (1986-2023)
- Northern Lights Conference (2023-present)
