= Jack Strand =

American football player (born 2004)

No. 18 – Atlanta Falcons
- Position: Quarterback
- Roster status: Active

Personal information
- Born: June 23, 2004 (age 22); Bloomer, Wisconsin, U.S.
- Listed height: 6 ft 5 in (1.96 m)
- Listed weight: 243 lb (110 kg)

Career information
- High school: Bloomer (Bloomer, Wisconsin)
- College: Minnesota State–Moorhead (2022–2025)
- NFL draft: 2026: undrafted

Career history
- Atlanta Falcons (2026–present)

Awards and highlights
- First-team D-II All-American (2025)

Career NFL statistics as of Week 2, 2026
- Passing attempts: 15
- Passing completions: 8
- Completion percentage: 53.0%
- TD–INT: 0-1
- Passing yards: 59
- Passer rating: 35.1
- Stats at Pro Football Reference

Jack Strand (born June 23, 2004) is an American professional football quarterback for the Atlanta Falcons of the National Football League (NFL). He played college football for the Minnesota State–Moorhead Dragons and he was signed as an undrafted free agent by the Falcons in 2026.

== Early life ==
Strand is from Bloomer, Wisconsin. One of four children, his brother plays college football for the Augustana Vikings. He attended Bloomer High School where he played football and baseball, winning three letters with the football team as a quarterback. He threw for 2,457 yards and 17 touchdowns in high school and was an all-region selection as well as a two-time all-conference performer. After high school, he committed to play college football for the Minnesota State–Moorhead Dragons (MSUM).

== College career ==
Strand was promoted to starting quarterback at MSUM four games into his true freshman season in 2022. He started the final eight games of the season, completing 230 of 356 pass attempts for 2,280 yards and 16 touchdowns with 13 interceptions. He broke the school record for single-game completions (45) and was named second-team All-Northern Sun Intercollegiate Conference (NSIC) North division for his performance in the 2022 season.

Strand was full-time starter for the Dragons in 2023 and appeared in 11 games, completing 370 of 550 passes for 3,914 yards and 36 touchdowns with 11 interceptions. His pass attempts, completions, yards and touchdowns all broke school single-season records, and he was named the MSUM Athlete of the Year, the NSIC Offensive Player of the Year, and first-team All-NSIC for his performance. A nominee for the Harlon Hill Trophy as the best NCAA Division II player, he placed second nationally in passing yards and third at the Division II level in passing touchdowns, while also tying the school record with six passing touchdowns in a game. As a junior in 2024, Strand played in 11 games and threw for 3,421 yards and 32 touchdowns with 13 interceptions, completing 61% of his passes while breaking the school records for career passing yards, completions, pass attempts and touchdowns. The NSIC's leading passer, he was named first-team All-NSIC, a Don Hansen honorable mention All-American, and a nominee for the Harlon Hill Trophy.

As a senior in 2025, Strand threw for 3,546 yards and 42 touchdowns with 14 interceptions. Selected first-team All-NSIC, the D2CCA Super Region 3 Offensive Player of the Year and the NSIC Offensive Player of the Year, he was the conference leader in passing yards and overall yards (3,834) while also breaking the team record for single-season passing touchdowns. He tied the NSIC record with seven passing touchdowns in a game and set the conference's career records for pass completions, yards and touchdowns. He was named first-team All-American by D2Football.com and placed fourth in voting for the 2025 Harlon Hill Trophy, becoming the first finalist for the award in MSUM history. Across 42 games, he threw for 13,161 yards and 126 touchdowns. His 13,000 passing yards equaled over seven miles. At the conclusion of his collegiate career, Strand ranked in the top-10 all-time at the Division II level in passing yards, attempts and completions. He was also a top student, posting a grade-point average (GPA) of 3.87 and being named a National Football Foundation (NFF) Scholar-Athlete. He was named CSC Academic All-District, first-team CSC Academic All-American, to the NSIC All-Academic Team of Excellence, and was a finalist for the William V. Campbell Trophy. Strand was also the Division II Football Academic All-America Team Member of the Year. He was invited to the 2026 American Bowl all-star game.

== Professional career ==
Pre-draft measurables
Height	Weight	Arm length	Hand span	Wingspan	40-yard dash	10-yard split	20-yard split	20-yard shuttle	Three-cone drill	Vertical jump	Broad jump
6 ft 3 7/8 in (1.93 m)	243 lb (110 kg)	32 3/4 in (0.83 m)	10 in (0.25 m)	6 ft 3 7/8 in (1.93 m)	4.78 s	1.69 s	2.75 s	4.31 s	7.22 s	35.0 in (0.89 m)	10 ft 1 in (3.07 m)
All values from Pro Day

Strand was signed as an undrafted free agent by the Atlanta Falcons after the conclusion of the 2026 NFL draft. In preseason, he completed 24 of 36 passes for 305 yards and a touchdown while also running for 29 yards and two touchdowns. Strand made the Falcons' 53-man roster for the 2026 season.

Strand took his first game snaps on September 20, 2026, when he replaced Cooper Rush in the second half in a losing effort against the Carolina Panthers. Strand's first NFL pass attempt was intercepted by Devin Lloyd, who returned it for a touchdown (pick-six). Strand finished the game with 8 completions on 15 attempts for 59 yards and an interception.
