= Wallace B. Grange =

American conservationist (1905–1987)

Wallace Byron Grange (1905 – 1987) was a conservationist and author in the United States.

He attended Ladysmith High School. He was the first superintendent of game for the Wisconsin Conservation Department and established a game farm in Door County. He then worked for the U.S. Biological Survey, which became the U.S. Fish and Wildlife Service, in Washington D.C.

He married a woman named Hazel, purchased a large property, and restored it. They turned it into a game farm, trapping deer and shipping them to restock areas where they had been depleted. It is now the Sandhill Wildlife Area.

The Wallace Grange Interpretive Trail at the preserve includes signage about his history. He brought bison to the area.

== Writings ==
- Feed Wildlife in Winter, a 21 page illustrated pamphlet (1937)
- Wisconsin Grouse Problems (1948)
- The Way of Game Abundance (1949)
- Those of the Fores
- As the Twig Is Bent, A Memoir
