= Joe Cooper (gridiron football) =

American gridiron football player (born 2002)

No. 66 – Edmonton Elks
- Position: Offensive lineman
- Roster status: Active
- CFL status: American

Personal information
- Born: March 19, 2002 (age 24)
- Listed height: 6 ft 7 in (2.01 m)
- Listed weight: 320 lb (145 kg)

Career information
- High school: Bermudian Springs (York Springs, Pennsylvania)
- College: Slippery Rock (2021–2025)
- NFL draft: 2026: undrafted

Career history
- Edmonton Elks (2026–present)

Awards and highlights
- Grey Cup champion (2026); First-team D-II All-American (2025); Second-team D-II All-American (2024); 3× All-PSAC West (2023–2025)
- Stats at CFL.ca

Joseph Cooper (born March 19, 2002) is an American professional football offensive lineman for the Edmonton Elks of the Canadian Football League (CFL). He played college football for Slippery Rock.

== Early life ==
Cooper was born on March 19, 2002. He attended Bermudian Springs High School in York Springs, Pennsylvania, where he played football and track. As a senior, Cooper had 37 tackles, four sacks and two fumble recoveries.

== College career ==
Cooper played college football for Slippery Rock from 2021 to 2025. He played in 43 games at left and right tackle, earning first-team All-PSAC West honors from 2023 to 2025. In 2024, Cooper was a second-team D-II All-American and was a consensus All-American as a senior. He was a finalist for the 2025 Gene Upshaw Award. Cooper was the only NCAA Division II player that was invited to the 2026 East–West Shrine Bowl.

== Professional career ==
Pre-draft measurables
Height	Weight	Arm length	Hand span	Wingspan	40-yard dash	10-yard split	20-yard split	20-yard shuttle	Three-cone drill	Vertical jump	Broad jump	Bench press
6 ft 6 in (1.98 m)	323 lb (147 kg)	31 3/4 in (0.81 m)	10 1/8 in (0.26 m)	6 ft 9 in (2.06 m)	4.54 s	1.87 s	3.20 s	4.68 s	8.08 s	28.5 in (0.72 m)	9 ft 2 in (2.79 m)	23 reps
All values from Pro day

On June 16, 2026, the Edmonton Elks of the Canadian Football League (CFL) signed Cooper to the practice roster. Om July 30, he was elevated to the active roster and made his CFL debut on August 1 against the Saskatchewan Roughriders at guard. On August 6, Cooper was re-signed to the practice roster. On September 10, he was promoted to the active roster in place of the injured Jordan Murray at right tackle.
