= Michigan-Wisconsin Conference =

Michigan and Wisconsin high school athletic conference (1937-1973)

The Michigan-Wisconsin Conference is a former high school athletic conference with members in northern Wisconsin and the Upper Peninsula of Michigan. Operational from 1937 to 1973, its public school members were part of the Wisconsin Interscholastic Athletic Association and the Michigan High School Athletic Association.

== History ==
=== 1937–1960 ===
Location of Original Michigan-Wisconsin Conference Members

The Michigan-Wisconsin Conference was formed in 1937 by five high schools near the border between the two states. Three members were located in Michigan's upper peninsula (Bessemer, Ironwood and Wakefield) and two were based in Wisconsin (Ashland and Hurley). All of the original member schools in the Michigan-Wisconsin Conference were located along the U.S. Route 2 corridor near the south shore of Lake Superior. Two new schools were added in 1950 when Calumet of Michigan and Park Falls of Wisconsin became members of the conference. Both schools already had commitments in other conferences to fulfill, and Park Falls didn't join for all of their sponsored sports until 1952. Calument joined as a football-only member alongside Park Falls, but they elected to remain members of Michigan's Copper Country Conference for all other sports. Park Falls only stayed for five years as a full member before they left in 1955 to join the Lumberjack Conference.

=== 1960–1973 ===
In 1960, the newly formed Northwestern High School in Maple brought membership in the Michigan-Wisconsin Conference back up to six schools. Superior East became the conference's seventh school in 1961, but closed in 1965 after merging with Superior Central to form the new Superior High School. They were immediately replaced by Cathedral High School, the only private school ever to play in the conference and a member of the Wisconsin Catholic Interscholastic Athletic Association. Just like their predecessor, they spent four years as conference members before closing their doors in 1969. The Michigan-Wisconsin Conference lasted for four more years before disbanding in 1973. Ashland and Hurley joined Wisconsin's Lumberjack Conference, and two Michigan schools (Bessemer and Wakefield) became charter members of the Western Upper Peninsula Athletic Conference. Northwestern spent a year as an independent before they became members of the Heart O'North Conference in Wisconsin, and Ironwood entered the Great Northern UP Conference in Michigan.

== Conference membership history ==
=== Final members ===
School	Location	Affiliation	Mascot	Colors	Joined	Left	Conference Joined	Current Conference
Ashland	Ashland, WI	Public	Oredockers		1937	1973	Lumberjack	Heart O'North
Bessemer	Bessemer, MI	Public	Speedboys		1937	1973	Western UP (MHSAA)	Independent
Hurley	Hurley, WI	Public	Midgets		1937	1973	Lumberjack	Northern Lights
Ironwood	Ironwood, MI	Public	Red Devils		1937	1973	Great Northern UP (MHSAA)	Independent
Northwestern	Maple, WI	Public	Tigers		1960	1973	Independent	Heart O'North
Wakefield	Wakefield, MI	Public	Cardinals		1937	1973	Western UP (MHSAA)	Independent

=== Previous members ===
School	Location	Affiliation	Mascot	Colors	Joined	Left	Conference Joined	Current Conference
Cathedral	Superior, WI	Private (Catholic)	Panthers		1965	1969	Closed	
Park Falls	Park Falls, WI	Public	Cardinals		1950	1955	Lumberjack	Closed in 2009 (merged into Chequamegon)
Superior East	Superior, WI	Public	Orientals		1961	1965	Closed (merged into Superior)	

=== Football-only members ===
School	Location	Affiliation	Mascot	Colors	Seasons	Primary Conference
Calumet	Calumet, MI	Public	Copper Kings		1952-1953	Copper Country

== List of state champions ==
Boys Basketball
School	Year	Organization	Class
Bessemer	1947	MHSAA	Class B (Upper Peninsula)
Hurley	1949	WIAA	Open Classification

Skiing
School	Year	Organization	Class
Hurley	1964	WIAA	Open Classification

Boys Tennis
School	Year	Organization	Class
Wakefield	1945	MHSAA	Open (Upper Peninsula)
Ironwood	1946	MHSAA	Class B (Upper Peninsula)
Wakefield	1946	MHSAA	Class C-D (Upper Peninsula)
Ironwood	1947	MHSAA	Class B (Upper Peninsula)
Wakefield	1947	MHSAA	Class C-D (Upper Peninsula)
Wakefield	1948	MHSAA	Class C-D (Upper Peninsula)
Wakefield	1949	MHSAA	Class C-D (Upper Peninsula)
Wakefield	1950	MHSAA	Class C-D (Upper Peninsula)
Wakefield	1951	MHSAA	Class C-D (Upper Peninsula)
Wakefield	1953	MHSAA	Class C-D (Upper Peninsula)
Wakefield	1957	MHSAA	Class C-D (Upper Peninsula)
Wakefield	1963	MHSAA	Class C-D (Upper Peninsula)
Wakefield	1964	MHSAA	Class C-D (Upper Peninsula)
Wakefield	1965	MHSAA	Class C-D (Upper Peninsula)
Wakefield	1969	MHSAA	Open (Upper Peninsula)

Boys Track & Field
School	Year	Organization	Classification
Ironwood	1940	MHSAA	Class B (Upper Peninsula)
Ironwood	1946	MHSAA	Class B (Upper Peninsula)
Ironwood	1948	MHSAA	Class B (Upper Peninsula)
Ironwood	1950	MHSAA	Class B (Upper Peninsula)
Bessemer	1951	MHSAA	Class C (Upper Peninsula)
Ironwood	1951	MHSAA	Class B (Upper Peninsula)
Wakefield	1952	MHSAA	Class C (Upper Peninsula)
Wakefield	1959	MHSAA	Class C (Upper Peninsula)
Wakefield	1960	MHSAA	Class C (Upper Peninsula)
Wakefield	1961	MHSAA	Class C (Upper Peninsula)
Wakefield	1962	MHSAA	Class C (Upper Peninsula)
Wakefield	1964	MHSAA	Class C (Upper Peninsula)

== List of conference champions ==
=== Boys Basketball ===
School	Quantity	Years
Ironwood	13	1939, 1940, 1941, 1944, 1946, 1953, 1954, 1957, 1959, 1961, 1963, 1966, 1971
Hurley	12	1943, 1947, 1949, 1951, 1952, 1955, 1957, 1959, 1960, 1961, 1962, 1973
Bessemer	7	1938, 1942, 1948, 1956, 1970, 1972, 1973
Wakefield	6	1958, 1959, 1962, 1964, 1967, 1970
Ashland	4	1945, 1946, 1950, 1968
Superior Cathedral	2	1966, 1969
Superior East	1	1965
Northwestern	0	
Park Falls	0	

=== Football ===
School	Quantity	Years
Ironwood	18	1937, 1938, 1939, 1943, 1944, 1945, 1949, 1952, 1953, 1959, 1962, 1963, 1965, 1967, 1968, 1969, 1970, 1971
Bessemer	10	1938, 1939, 1941, 1942, 1944, 1947, 1956, 1957, 1961, 1967
Hurley	8	1942, 1948, 1949, 1950, 1951, 1954, 1968, 1970
Wakefield	5	1958, 1959, 1960, 1970, 1972
Ashland	4	1946, 1949, 1955, 1966
Superior Cathedral	1	1967
Superior East	1	1964
Calumet	0	
Northwestern	0	
Park Falls	0	
