= Ladysmith High School =

Public school in Ladysmith, Wisconsin

Location
- 1700 Edgewood Avenue E Ladysmith, Wisconsin 54848; United States
- 45°28′18″N 91°4′34″W

Information
- School type: Public
- Established: 1902
- School district: Ladysmith School District
- Superintendent: Jason LeMay
- NCES School ID: 550759000877
- Principal: Kirk Yudes
- Teaching staff: 19.39 (FTE)
- Grades: 6-12
- Enrollment: 255 (2024-2025)
- Student to teacher ratio: 13.15
- Colors: Purple; Gold
- Mascot: Lumberjack
- Website: https://www.ladysmith.k12.wi.us/

Ladysmith High School is in Ladysmith, Wisconsin in northwest Wisconsin. As of 2025, about 87 percent of students are white and half are documented as economically disadvantaged.

Lumberjacks are the school mascot and the school colors are purple and gold. They have been members of the Heart O'North Conference since its founding in 1928. In 2003, the school won its first WIAA state championship in basketball. The Green Bay Packers, Certor Sports, and Ticketmaster donated football helmets to the school. A wrestler at the school won the WIAA division 3 190 pound state championship in 2024.

== History ==
A ca. 1905 postcard of the school exists. From 1967 to 1970 a new school building was constructed.

In 1990, the school auditorium was used as a hearing to grant the Flambeau Mining Company to mine copper and cold from a nearby open pit. Some attendees disrupted the meeting, including one who used a dead fish. The incident resulted in one arrest.

The first class of its hall of fame was set to be inducted in 2025.

It has cross-country ski trails.

The school has band and choir programs. It also offers college level classes.

== Alumni ==
- James W. Edming, politician
- Wallace B. Grange wildlife biolgist and conservationist

== See also ==
- List of high schools in Wisconsin
