= Hayward High School (Wisconsin) =

Location
- 10320 Greenwood Lane; Hayward, Sawyer, WI 54843; United States
- Coordinates: 46°0′38″N 91°30′12″W

Information
- School type: Public, High School
- Superintendent: Craig Olsen
- Principal: Doug Stark
- Staff: 39.55 (FTE)
- Grades: 9-12
- Student to teacher ratio: 12.95
- Colors: Black and gold
- Nickname: Hurricanes
- Newspaper: Wa Na Ki (Eye of the Hurricane)
- Website: http://www.hayward.k12.wi.us/

Hayward High School (HHS) serves students in and around Hayward, Wisconsin.

== History ==
Hayward High School was originally established between 4th and 5th Streets and Minnesota and Wisconsin Avenues in downtown Hayward. The building was demolished in March 2017 in order to provide expanded parking for the current Intermediate School.

== Academics ==
Hayward Community Schools received the "What Parents Want" award in 2012. Hayward High School received a Silver Award from U.S. News & World Report for the 2010-2011 school year.

== Athletics ==
Hayward's teams are nicknamed the Hurricanes, and their colors are black and gold. They have been affiliated with the Heart O'North Conference since 1946.
