= Bloomer High School =

Location
- 1310 17th Ave Bloomer, Wisconsin 54724; Bloomer, Chippewa County, Wisconsin; United States; 45.09863°N 91.49001°W

Information
- Funding type: Public
- Principal: Chad Steinmetz
- Staff: 27.76 (on an FTE basis)
- Grades: 9 – 12
- Enrollment: 400 (2024–25)
- Student to teacher ratio: 14.41
- Colors: Black & orange
- Song: On Wisconsin
- Mascot: Blackhawk
- Website: School District of Bloomer

Bloomer High School is a public school serving grades 9 through 12 in Bloomer, Chippewa County, Wisconsin, United States.

== Officials ==
- District Administrator: Lee Bush
- Principal: Chad Steinmetz
- Athletic Director: Jason Steinmetz
- Curriculum Director: Denise Michaelsen

== Athletics ==
Bloomer's teams are called the Blackhawks, and they were longtime members of the Heart O'North Conference before joining the Cloverbelt Conference in 2021.

=== Athletic conference affiliation history ===
- Heart O'North Conference (1928-1989)
- Middle Border Conference (1989-1994)
- Heart O'North Conference (1994-2021)
- Cloverbelt Conference (2021-present)

== Notable alumni ==
- Jack Strand, NFL quarterback for the Atlanta Falcons
