= Virginia High School (Minnesota) =

Coordinates: 47°31′13″N 92°32′22″W

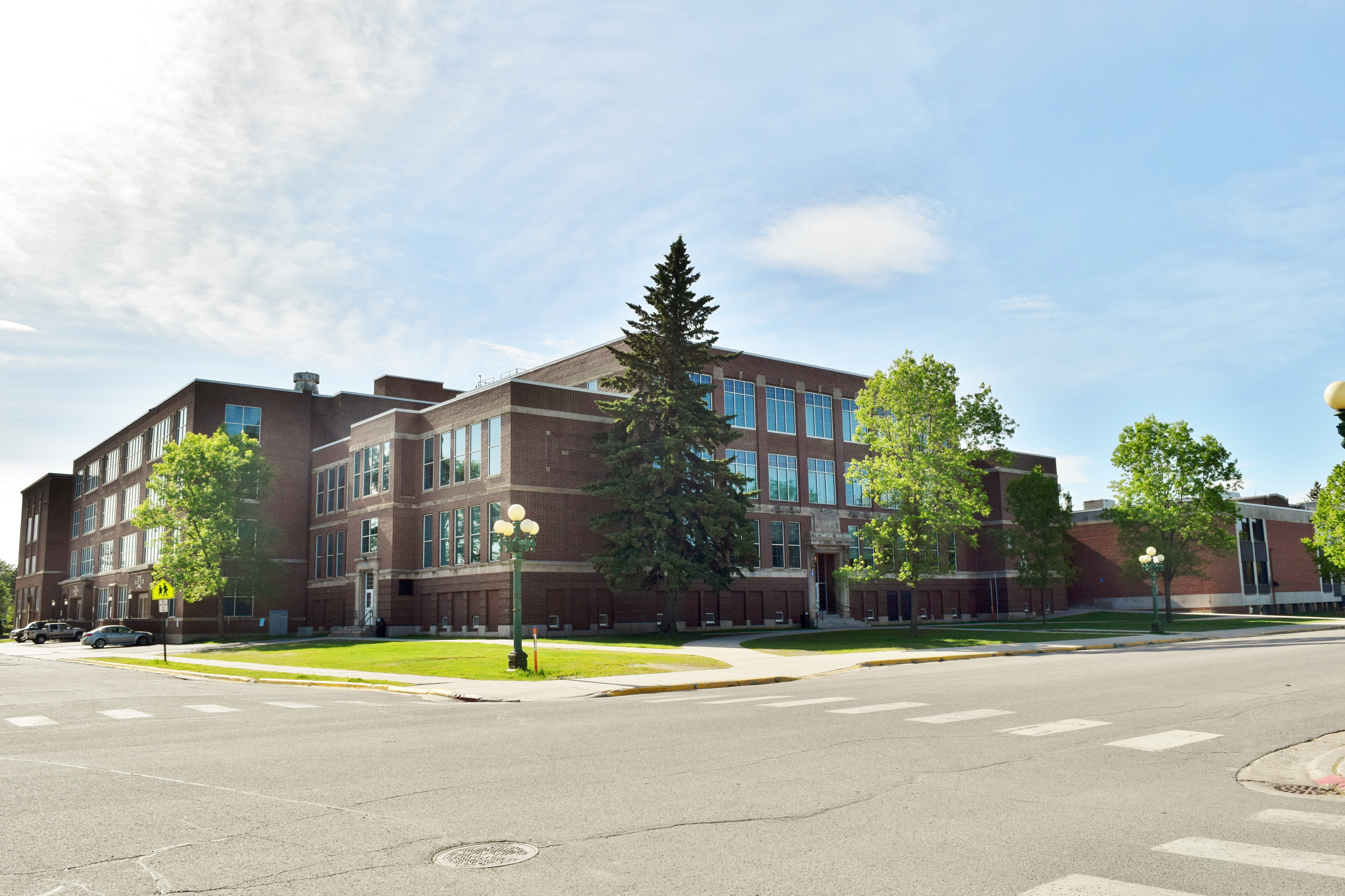

Location
- 411 South 5th Avenue, Virginia; Minnesota 55792; United States

Information
- Type: Public, coeducational secondary school
- Established: 1893
- School district: Rock Ridge Public Schools
- Superintendent: Noel Schmidt
- Principal: Lisa Perkovich
- Teaching staff: 45.68 (FTE)
- Grades: 7–12
- Enrollment: 729 (2018-19)
- Student to teacher ratio: 15.96
- Colors: Royal blue and white
- Athletics conference: Iron Range Conference
- Nickname: Blue Devils
- Yearbook: Rohian
- Website: www.vmps.org

Virginia High School was a public secondary school located in Virginia, Minnesota, United States. Established in 1893, the school served students in grades 7–12 and was part of Independent School District 706 for most of its existence. Known as the home of the Blue Devils, Virginia High School played a central role in the civic, cultural, and educational life of the Iron Range. for more than 130 years. The school officially closed in June 2022, as part of the regional consolidation into Rock Ridge Public Schools, which now operates Rock Ridge High School.

== History ==
Virginia High School opened in 1893 during a period of rapid growth tied to the development of the iron mining industry in northeastern Minnesota. As Virginia evolved from a frontier settlement into a thriving mining city, the school became a focal point for community identity and pride. The school was initially housed in modest wooden structures before the completion of a more permanent brick facility.

One of the most iconic features of the campus was the "Technical Building," completed in 1910 and listed in the Minnesota Historic Property Record as a noteworthy example of early 20th-century educational architecture on the Iron Range. This structure was part of a wave of progressive-era investments in public education, aimed at preparing students for both academic and industrial careers. It featured spacious classrooms, science laboratories, and vocational training areas—uncommon at the time in rural Minnesota.

In the decades that followed, the school underwent multiple renovations and expansions to accommodate enrollment growth. During the 1950s and 1960s, a new gymnasium and science wing were added. The campus eventually included athletic fields, a media center, and specialized facilities for music and industrial arts.

Despite its architectural and cultural significance, the aging facilities posed increasing maintenance and accessibility challenges. By the early 2020s, district leaders finalized plans for a new consolidated high school, and Virginia High School was closed in June 2022 as part of the Rock Ridge Schools initiative..

== Campus and facilities ==
Virginia High School was centrally located at 411 South 5th Avenue, directly across from the St. Louis County Courthouse. The campus architecture reflected early 20th-century design, with arched windows, detailed masonry, and oak interior finishes. Its layout integrated academic, athletic, and arts spaces across several connected buildings.

=== Goodman Auditorium ===
One of the most revered spaces in the school was the Goodman Auditorium. Known for its excellent acoustics and ornate design, the auditorium hosted countless school concerts, theatrical productions, guest speakers, and community events. It served as the primary performance venue for the school’s acclaimed music programs and was considered a cultural gem of the Iron Range. Its significance is documented in archived school event programs and regional press coverage, including the *Mesabi Daily News*, which regularly reviewed performances held there.

The auditorium featured a large proscenium stage, a balcony level, and original wood seating. Community organizations and regional festivals frequently used the space, strengthening the bond between the school and the broader community.

== Academic programs ==
Virginia High School maintained a rigorous academic program throughout its history. It offered a traditional high school curriculum, Advanced Placement (AP) courses, and a wide variety of electives. In later years, it developed strong partnerships with Mesabi Range College and Vermilion Community College, enabling students to pursue concurrent enrollment opportunities for college credit.

The school also collaborated with neighboring districts to expand access to vocational training in fields such as health sciences, business, and trades. These partnerships reflected an ongoing commitment to preparing students for both college and career pathways.

== Student life and traditions ==
Virginia High School was home to a variety of clubs, student-led initiatives, and long-standing traditions. Its student council played an active role in organizing events such as Homecoming, Snow Week, and senior send-off activities. One unique feature was "The Urban Edge," a student-run coffee shop that offered hands-on experience in business management.

The school’s mascot, the Blue Devil, and its royal blue and white colors were displayed at athletic events and spirit rallies. The school song and fight song were performed at every major school gathering.

== Arts and Music ==
=== Band Program ===
Virginia High School operated a comprehensive instrumental music program for students in grades 7–12. The program included:

- 7th Grade Band
- 8th Grade Band
- Concert Band (grades 9–12)
- Wind Ensemble (auditioned, grades 9–12)
- Jazz Band
- Virginia Marching Blues (grades 9–12)

The bands performed multiple times each year in Goodman Auditorium and at community events. The Virginia Marching Blues appeared annually at the Land of the Loon Festival, various 4 July parades, and other civic parades in northeastern Minnesota.

Under the direction of Joshua Biles in the 2010s and early 2020s, the band program also participated in Minnesota Music Educators Association (MMEA) clinics and regional honor band events.

=== Choir Program ===
Virginia High School’s vocal music program supported a structured progression of ensembles from grades 7 through 12. Longtime directors included Dallis Frandsen (1967–1996) and Matthew Krage (2000s–2020s).

Junior high choirs included:

- 7th Grade Men’s Choir
- 7th Grade Women’s Choir
- 8th Grade Men’s Choir
- 8th Grade Women’s Choir

At the senior high level, the program included:

- **Kantori** – non-auditioned tenor/bass choir for grades 9–12
- **Bel Canto** – non-auditioned soprano/alto choir for grades 9–12
- **A Cappella Choir** – auditioned SATB choir for grades 10–12

Prior to 2017, the school’s primary non-auditioned mixed choir was known as Varsity Blues. It was dissolved after the 2016–2017 academic year.

The Virginia High School A Cappella Choir performed advanced repertoire and represented the school in MSHSL music contests. The ensemble also completed national tours every two years, traveling to cities including New York City, San Francisco, Oklahoma City, Honolulu, Phoenix, and Minneapolis.

Several small chamber groups were formed annually for contests and featured performances.

=== Orchestra Program ===
Virginia High School operated a cooperative orchestra program with Eveleth-Gilbert High School under the direction of Sheila Wilcox. The program included:

- Junior High Orchestra (grades 7–8), which rehearsed in Gilbert
- Senior High Orchestra (grades 9–12), which rehearsed in Virginia

Both ensembles performed three concerts each year and participated in honor orchestra events throughout the region. Performances took place in Goodman Auditorium.

Select students also performed with the Mesabi Symphony Orchestra, a regional ensemble founded in 1978 that included high school and community musicians.

=== Musical Theatre Program ===
The school staged a full musical production annually in Goodman Auditorium. These productions involved students from choir, band, orchestra, and technical education classes. Titles performed included *The Sound of Music*, *Guys and Dolls*, *Les Misérables*, *Into the Woods*, and *Fiddler on the Roof*.

Faculty-led productions often included a student pit orchestra and technical crew. A typical musical season involved auditions in the fall, rehearsals throughout winter, and performances in early spring. In addition to the musical, the school also produced one-act plays and student-directed performances. Virginia High School regularly participated in the Minnesota State High School League’s One-Act Play competition.

Musical theatre at Virginia High School was supported by local sponsors and booster groups and served as a central arts event on the school calendar.

== Athletics ==
Virginia High School was a long‑standing member of the Minnesota State High School League (MSHSL) and competed in the Iron Range Conference alongside other northeastern Minnesota schools. The school fielded varsity teams in:

- Boys’ and Girls’ Hockey
- Football
- Boys’ and Girls’ Basketball
- Cross Country
- Track and Field
- Boys’ and Girls’ Swimming and Diving
- Baseball
- Softball
- Boys’ and Girls’ Tennis
- Boys’ and Girls’ Soccer
- Volleyball
- Boys’ and Girls’ Golf
- Wrestling

=== Football ===
The Virginia Blue Devils football program competed in MSHSL Class A and later Section 7AAA of the Northeast District. Under head coach Ed Cremers, the team qualified for state tournament play in 1990, 1995, and 2004. Records from the 2016 season show a typical 3–6 win-loss record with a Section 7AAA seed.

=== Hockey ===
The boys’ hockey program, founded in the 1940s, was one of the Iron Range's oldest. Frequently advancing in Section 7A playoffs, VHS maintained longstanding rivalries with Eveleth‑Gilbert, Hibbing, and Duluth Denfeld. Home games were played at the Miners Memorial Building, built in 1958 and recognized as a historic hockey venue.

=== Other sports ===
School teams competed in regional MSHSL tournaments at the Class A/AA level (based on enrollment), though specific placements are less chronicled. The volleyball and soccer programs regularly competed in district playoffs. Swimming, track and field, basketball, tennis, cross country, golf, wrestling, baseball, and softball similarly participated in seasonal competitions, though detailed historical records from local newspapers are sparse.

All VHS athletic teams traditionally competed under the “Blue Devils” mascot with royal blue and white team colors.

== Academic competitions ==
Virginia High School competed in regional and state Knowledge Bowl tournaments, advancing to the state level multiple times, including in 2009, 2010, 2013, and 2017. The school also supported competitive math teams, science fairs, speech and debate, and National Honor Society chapters.

== Closure and legacy ==
Virginia High School graduated its final class in spring 2022. The closure marked the end of an era for the city and the Iron Range. Alongside Eveleth-Gilbert High School, it was succeeded by Rock Ridge High School, which opened in 2023 as part of a long-term plan to unify and modernize education in the region.

Artifacts from Virginia High School, including trophies, class photos, and stage backdrops from Goodman Auditorium, were preserved by local historical societies and displayed at the new high school.

The legacy of Virginia High School lives on through its alumni, many of whom became leaders in fields such as mining, public service, education, and the arts. Its cultural and educational contributions continue to shape the identity of the Iron Range well into the 21st century.

== See also ==
- List of high schools in Minnesota
