= Cumberland School District =

School district in Wisconsin, US

Address
- 1010 8th Ave Cumberland, Barron County, Wisconsin, 54829; United States
- Coordinates: 45°31′42.0″N 92°01′49.2″W

District information
- Type: Public School
- Motto: Education for a lifetime!
- NCES District ID: 5503090

Students and staff
- Students: 397 Elementary School (PK–4); 247 Middle School (5–8); 311 High School (9–12)
- Staff: 125
- District mascot: Beaver
- Colors: Red & white

Other information
- Website: cumberland.k12.wi.us

Cumberland School District is a school district that serves students from pre-kindergarten to 12th grade. This district is located in Cumberland, Wisconsin, which is located at the intersection of US Hwy 63 and Wisconsin Hwy 48 just 50 miles north of Interstate 94. The approximate enrollment is about 1,100 students. Cumberland is nicknamed the “Island City“ and it is located in Wisconsin's “Great Northwest.”

== Schools ==
=== Cumberland Elementary School ===
Cumberland Elementary School is for kindergarten to fourth grade students. The school's principal is Jim Richie. There are about 397 students who attend Cumberland Elementary. For every teacher there is about fifteen students. The policy at the school is to always put the child first.

=== Cumberland Middle School ===
Cumberland Middle School is for fifth through eighth grade students. The school's principal is Colin Green. There are about 247 students who attend Cumberland Middle School. When teaching the curriculum, it is enhanced with options in technical and technology education, physical education, the arts that include general music, chorus, band, and two computer labs. Also offered are many extra-curricular sports and clubs to round out the total middle school program.

=== Cumberland High School ===
Cumberland High School is for ninth through twelfth grade students. The school's principal is Dan Hopkins. There are about 311 students who attend CHS. The student-to-teacher ratio is around 16 students per one full-time teacher. The music and drama departments provide other opportunities in band, chorus and theatre, with the Cumberland High School marching band having won WSMA state championships in 1997, 1998, 1999, 2000, 2001, 2002, 2004, 2009, 2010, 2011, 2012, and 2013. There are extra-curricular activities such as sports, service clubs, academics, art and the performing arts. About 86 percent of CHS students are white, eight percent are Hispanic, four percent are Native American, and all other races combine for the remaining two percent of the school's enrollment. Their athletic mascot is the Beaver, and they have been members of the Heart O'North Conference since its 1928 founding.

=== Island City Academy ===
Island City Academy is the Cumberland School District's charter school. It serves grades seven through twelve.

== Alumni ==
- Ben Peterson, 2x NCAA Champion wrestler at Iowa State; 1972 and 1976 Olympic Gold and Silver medalist respectfully
- Roger A. Towberman, 1st chief master sergeant of the Space Force
