= Barron High School =

Coordinates: 45.3970°N 91.8433°W

Barron Area Senior High School

Location
- 1050 East Woodland Avenue; Barron, Barron County, Wisconsin; United States

Information
- Type: Public secondary
- Oversight: Barron Area School District
- Principal: Chad Buss
- Teaching staff: 26.80 (FTE)
- Enrollment: 312 (2023-2024)
- Student to teacher ratio: 11.64
- Colors: Maroon and Gold
- Athletics conference: Heart O'North Conference
- Mascot: Golden Bears
- Website: Barron HS

Barron High School is a public high school located in Barron, Wisconsin. It serves students in groups 9 through 12 and has a student body of 424 students as of the 2018-2019 school year. BHS' athletic teams are known as the Golden Bears.

== History ==
The first recorded instance of a four-year high school in Barron was 1895.

== Demographics ==
Barron is 79 percent white, 13 percent black, five percent Hispanic, two percent Asian and one percent Native American.

== Athletics ==
Barron High School has a nine-hole disc golf course that wraps around the school's other athletic fields. The Golden Bears have competed in the Heart O'North Conference since its inception in 1928.

== E-Day ==
Every year, Barron High School participates in E-Day, also known as Environmental Day. On Wednesday, May 7, 2014, over 350 of the high school students took time away from their studies to help clean up around the community. More than 20 volunteer projects were planned for the event. These activities change every year and some of these include cleaning up at the Pioneer Village Museum, painting picnic tables, cleaning park grounds, maintenance work at city parks, helping out at the local humane society, and doing work around the school. E-day gives students the opportunity to gain community service experience, work together, and gives them a chance to help the environment. A local phone company called Mosaic Telecom supports the project by donating t-shirts to all the students who participate in the E-Day program.

== Notable alumni ==
- David Madson, Class of 1981
