= Eveleth-Gilbert High School =

Coordinates: 47.4642°N 92.5318°W

Eveleth Gilbert High School

Location
- 801 Jones St; Eveleth, Minnesota, 55734; United States

Information
- School type: High School
- Mottoes: Fiercely United
- Established: 1918
- School district: Rock Ridge Public Schools
- NCES District ID: MN-012909
- Superintendent: Noel Schmidt
- Chairman: Stacey Sundquist
- Dean: Elisa Boe
- Principal: Angie Willams
- Grades: 9-12
- Schedule: 8:15am-3:05pm
- Budget: $178 Million

Eveleth-Gilbert High School (EGHS) was a public school located in Eveleth, Minnesota, United States. The high school was closed permanently at the end of the 2022-2023 school year and students were transferred to the Rock Ridge Public Schools, District 2909.
