= Bloomer, Wisconsin =

City in Wisconsin, United States

- City
- Logo

- Location of Bloomer in Chippewa County, Wisconsin

- Location within Wisconsin Location within the United States
- Coordinates: 45°6′8″N 91°29′30″W
- Country: United States
- State: Wisconsin
- County: Chippewa

Government
  - Mayor: Anthony Rubenzer

Area
  - Total: 3.10 sq mi (8.03 km^{2})
  - Land: 2.95 sq mi (7.64 km^{2})
  - Water: 0.15 sq mi (0.39 km^{2})
- Elevation: 994 ft (303 m)

Population (2020)
  - Total: 3,683
  - Density: 1,250/sq mi (482/km^{2})
- Time zone: UTC-6 (Central (CST))
  - Summer (DST): UTC-5 (CDT)
- Postal code: 54724
- Area codes: 715 & 534
- FIPS code: 55-08225
- GNIS feature ID: 1561930
- Website: ci.bloomer.wi.us

Bloomer is a city in Chippewa County, Wisconsin, United States. As of the 2020 census, the population of the city of Bloomer was 3,683.

== History ==
Jeremiah Bloomer and a group of men from Galena, Illinois built a mill on the site in 1848. As winter approached, he sold the dam to H. S. Allen and returned to Galena. Settled in 1855, the village was known as Vanville until 1867, when it was surveyed and platted.

== Geography ==
According to the United States Census Bureau, the city has a total area of 3.09 square miles (8.00 km^{2}), of which 2.94 square miles (7.61 km^{2}) is land and 0.15 square miles (0.39 km^{2}) is water.

Bloomer is situated along U.S. Highway 53 and Wisconsin Highway 40, as well as County Roads F, Q and SS. Wisconsin Highway 64 is nearby.

=== Climate ===
Climate data for Bloomer, Wisconsin (1991–2020 normals, extremes 1944–present)
Month	Jan	Feb	Mar	Apr	May	Jun	Jul	Aug	Sep	Oct	Nov	Dec	Year
Record high °F (°C)	51 (11)	60 (16)	81 (27)	90 (32)	94 (34)	99 (37)	103 (39)	104 (40)	95 (35)	88 (31)	75 (24)	62 (17)	104 (40)
Mean daily maximum °F (°C)	21.3 (−5.9)	26.4 (−3.1)	39.1 (3.9)	54.2 (12.3)	67.7 (19.8)	77.2 (25.1)	81.4 (27.4)	79.1 (26.2)	71.0 (21.7)	56.4 (13.6)	40.3 (4.6)	27.0 (−2.8)	53.4 (11.9)
Daily mean °F (°C)	12.4 (−10.9)	16.4 (−8.7)	29.2 (−1.6)	43.5 (6.4)	56.5 (13.6)	66.4 (19.1)	70.5 (21.4)	68.1 (20.1)	59.7 (15.4)	46.0 (7.8)	32.1 (0.1)	19.1 (−7.2)	43.3 (6.3)
Mean daily minimum °F (°C)	3.4 (−15.9)	6.5 (−14.2)	19.4 (−7.0)	32.7 (0.4)	45.4 (7.4)	55.6 (13.1)	59.6 (15.3)	57.0 (13.9)	48.4 (9.1)	35.6 (2.0)	23.9 (−4.5)	11.2 (−11.6)	33.2 (0.7)
Record low °F (°C)	−43 (−42)	−36 (−38)	−36 (−38)	2 (−17)	18 (−8)	30 (−1)	41 (5)	34 (1)	22 (−6)	6 (−14)	−18 (−28)	−35 (−37)	−43 (−42)
Average precipitation inches (mm)	1.00 (25)	0.94 (24)	1.58 (40)	2.93 (74)	3.73 (95)	4.51 (115)	4.14 (105)	3.98 (101)	3.32 (84)	2.82 (72)	1.74 (44)	1.22 (31)	31.91 (811)
Average snowfall inches (cm)	9.3 (24)	9.9 (25)	7.2 (18)	2.4 (6.1)	0.3 (0.76)	0.0 (0.0)	0.0 (0.0)	0.0 (0.0)	0.0 (0.0)	0.6 (1.5)	2.6 (6.6)	9.5 (24)	41.8 (106)
Average precipitation days (≥ 0.01 in)	8.3	6.3	7.7	10.9	12.1	12.2	10.1	9.4	10.2	9.9	6.9	8.6	112.6
Average snowy days (≥ 0.1 in)	4.5	3.6	2.5	1.0	0.1	0.0	0.0	0.0	0.0	0.3	1.4	4.5	17.9
Source: NOAA

== Demographics ==
Historical population
Census	Pop.	Note	%±
1880	304		—
1890	631		107.6%
1900	811		28.5%
1910	1,204		48.5%
1920	1,648		36.9%
1930	1,865		13.2%
1940	2,204		18.2%
1950	2,556		16.0%
1960	2,834		10.9%
1970	3,143		10.9%
1980	3,342		6.3%
1990	3,085		−7.7%
2000	3,347		8.5%
2010	3,539		5.7%
2020	3,683		4.1%
WI Counties 1900–1990

=== 2010 census ===
As of the census of 2010, there were 3,539 people, 1,562 households, and 932 families living in the city. The population density was 1,203.7 inhabitants per square mile (464.8/km^{2}). There were 1,656 housing units at an average density of 563.3 per square mile (217.5/km^{2}). The racial makeup of the city was 97.9% White, 0.3% African American, 0.2% Native American, 0.3% Asian, 0.3% from other races, and 1.0% from two or more races. Hispanic or Latino people of any race were 0.8% of the population.

There were 1,562 households, of which 28.1% had children under the age of 18 living with them, 46.9% were married couples living together, 9.7% had a female householder with no husband present, 3.1% had a male householder with no wife present, and 40.3% were non-families. 34.5% of all households were made up of individuals, and 17.4% had someone living alone who was 65 years of age or older. The average household size was 2.25 and the average family size was 2.89.

The median age in the city was 40.2 years. 23.1% of residents were under the age of 18; 8.2% were between the ages of 18 and 24; 24% were from 25 to 44; 25.8% were from 45 to 64; and 19% were 65 years of age or older. The gender makeup of the city was 47.0% male and 53.0% female.

=== 2000 census ===
As of the census of 2000, there were 3,347 people, 1,424 households, and 901 families living in the city. The population density was 1,246.0 people per square mile (480.4/km^{2}). There were 1,487 housing units at an average density of 553.6 per square mile (213.4/km^{2}). The racial makeup of the city was 99.13% White, 0.06% Black or African American, 0.27% Native American, 0.09% Asian, 0.06% from other races, and 0.39% from two or more races. 0.33% of the population were Hispanic or Latino of any race.

There were 1,424 households, out of which 27.8% had children under the age of 18 living with them, 53.7% were married couples living together, 7.3% had a female householder with no husband present, and 36.7% were non-families. 32.2% of all households were made up of individuals, and 16.6% had someone living alone who was 65 years of age or older. The average household size was 2.31 and the average family size was 2.92.

In the city, the population was spread out, with 24.0% under the age of 18, 8.1% from 18 to 24, 26.6% from 25 to 44, 20.7% from 45 to 64, and 20.6% who were 65 years of age or older. The median age was 39 years. For every 100 females, there were 88.4 males. For every 100 females age 18 and over, there were 83.4 males.

The median income for a household in the city was $42,635, and the median income for a family was $57,974.

== Education ==
Bloomer High School is the local high school (9–12). Bloomer Middle School is the local middle school (5–8) and Bloomer Elementary School is the local elementary school (4k-4).

Saint Paul's Catholic School is the local private Catholic school (5k-8).

St. Paul Lutheran School is a Christian Pre-K-8 school of the Wisconsin Evangelical Lutheran Synod in Bloomer.

== Recreation ==
Bloomer hosts an annual jump rope competition and has been called the "rope jump capital of the world", a title it earned after being featured on national television.

== Notable people ==
- Jack Strand (born 2004) – American football quarterback

== See also ==
- List of cities in Wisconsin
