= Ashland School District (Wisconsin) =

School district in Wisconsin, USA

Ashland School District is the school district in Ashland County, Wisconsin. The current enrollment is 2257 in grades K-12. The superintendent is Ken Kasinski.

== Schools ==
Ashland School District has five schools:

=== Ashland High School ===
- Enrollment: 772
- Staff: 99
- Brian Tretin, Principal

=== Ashland Middle School ===
- Enrollment: 492
- Staff: 78
- Tom Gaudreau, Principal

=== Lake Superior Intermediate ===
- Enrollment: 413
- Staff: 63
- John Esposito, Principal

=== Lake Superior Primary ===
- Enrollment: 388
- Staff: 63
- Christopher Graff, Principal

=== Marengo Valley ===
- Enrollment: 165
- Staff: 28
- Barb O'Brien, Principal
