= Superior High School (Wisconsin) =

Secondary school in Superior, Wisconsin, U.S.

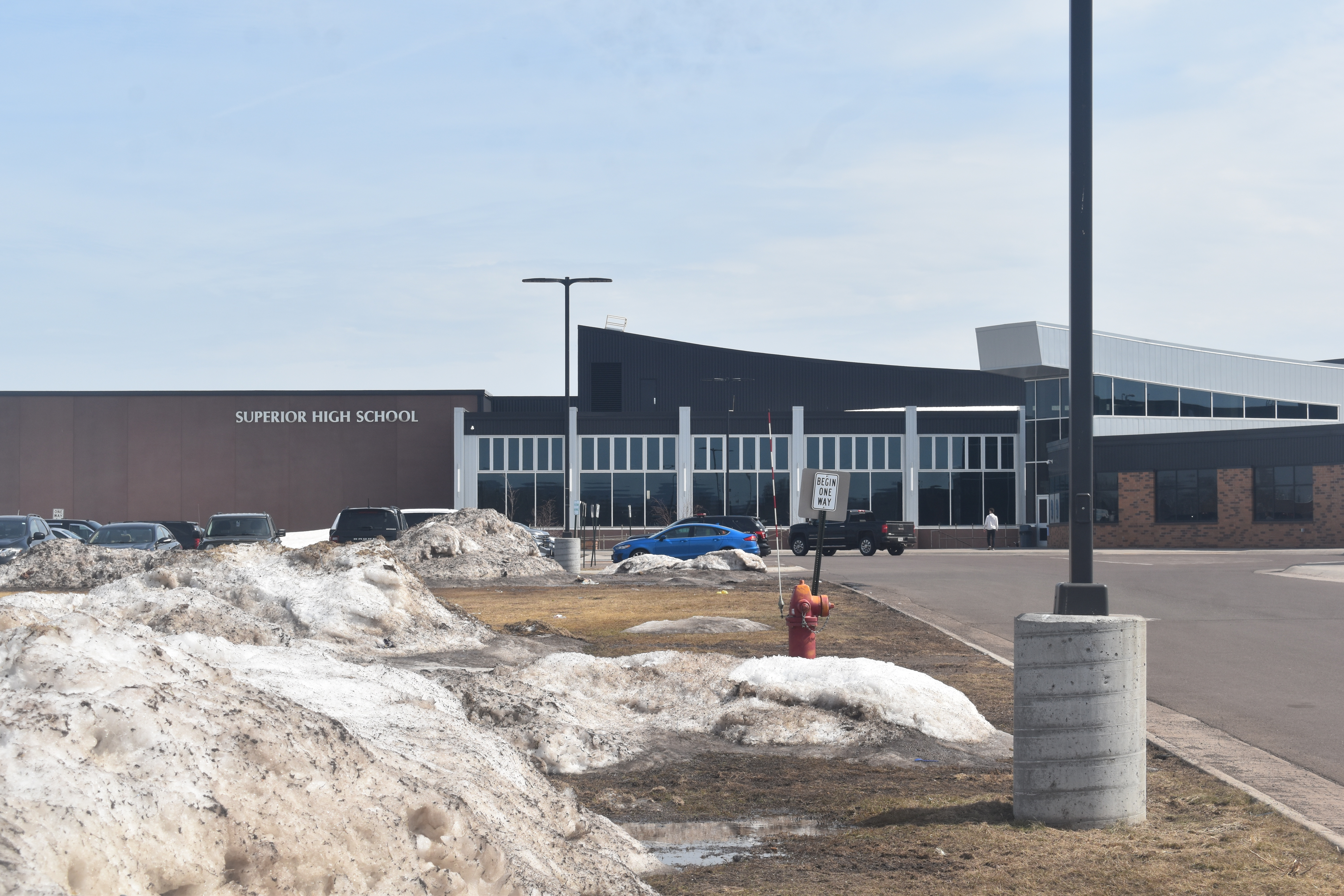

Location
- 2600 Catlin Ave, Superior, WI 54880; Superior, Wisconsin; United States; 46.70716°N 92.08495°W

Information
- Type: Public
- Established: 1965
- Staff: 92.30 (FTE)
- Enrollment: 1,290 (2023-2024)
- Student to teacher ratio: 13.98
- Colors: Columbia blue and white
- Mascot: Sparty the Spartan
- Team name: Spartans
- Website: Superior School District

Superior High School (SHS) is one of two high schools in Superior, Wisconsin, United States, the other being Maranatha Academy. The School District of Superior opened SHS in 1965 as Superior Senior High School (SSHS) to replace East and Central High Schools. Those schools became middle schools, which were both closed and torn down in 2003. (An office building built on part of Central's site was completed in 2008 and a housing project was built on East's site, the last lot being developed in 2012).

The high school serves about 1,600 students in grades 9–12 with a staff of around 150.

== Academics ==
Superior High School offers a wide selection of classes. Several selections in English, History/Social Studies, Science, Mathematics, Foreign Language, Music, Physical Education, Business, Art, and Technical Education classes are available. Superior High School also offers many Advanced Placement courses, including: AP Literature and Composition, AP Calculus, AP United States History, AP World History, AP Physics, AP Chemistry, AP Biology, and AP Psychology. It also offers several College in the Schools (CITS) courses, which give students the opportunity to earn college credits through Lake Superior College, courses offered in this category include: CITS Precalculus, Communications, and Anatomy and Physiology.

By enrolling in an AP course, students have the opportunity to take the AP Exam in the spring of the year in which they took the course, which allows students the chance to earn college credit if a sufficient score is achieved on the test. Beginning in the 2008-2009 school year, all students enrolled in AP courses at Superior High School are required to take the AP Exam for each course they took.

Required classes

Grade 9	Grade 10	Grade 11	Grade 12
English 9	English 10	English 11	English 12
Social Studies 9	Social Studies 10	Social Studies 11	Social Studies 12
Math 9	Math 10	Math 11	(Senior Project)
Science 9	Biology 10	Science 11	
Phy. Ed. 9	Phy. Ed. 10	Phy. Ed. 11	
Keystone	Health 10		

Requirements for graduation

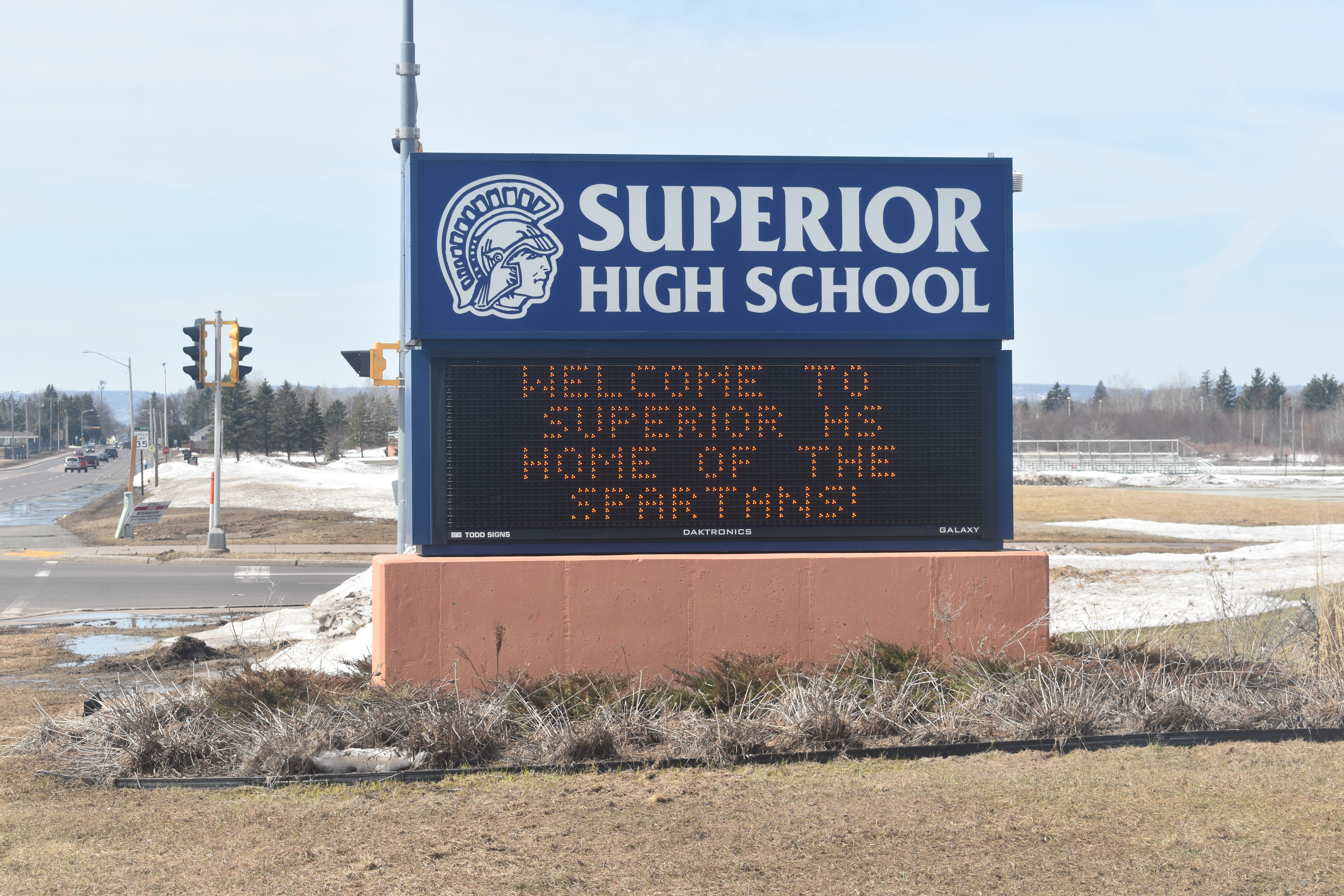
A sign for Superior High School on the south-west side of the building.

All students must accumulate 22 credits in grades 9-12 in addition to one-half credit of Health in grades 7-12, and register for a minimum of 5.5 credits each year. Students may take up to 7 credits per year. One credit of English is required each year in grades 9-12; one credit of Social Studies/History is required each year, three credits of Math are required including one credit of algebra, three credits of Science (9th grade Science and 10th grade Biology, then one of choice in 11th grade); and one-half credit of Physical Education each year in grades 9, 10, and 11. Also one-half credit of Keystone is required for the graduating class of 2006 and beyond, with a 10th grade health class being added. All seniors must complete a Senior Project in order to graduate. A student may take up to seven credits per school year (there are seven class hours). A student must take a minimum of five and one-half credits. Students are recommended, in most cases, to take a minimum of six credits.

== Athletics ==
Superior, Wisconsin borders Minnesota, and, as a result, SHS's athletic teams primarily compete with schools located in Minnesota, like Denfeld High School, East High School, Proctor High School, and Cloquet High School.

Wisconsin high schools that SHS competes with include Ashland, Eau Claire North, Eau Claire Memorial, Hudson, River Falls, Rice Lake, Chippewa Falls and New Richmond.

Athletic activities available to students include the following:

Fall	Winter	Spring
Boys and Girls Cross Country	Boys & Girls Basketball C-Team	Baseball
Football 9	Boys & Girls Basketball	Boys Golf
Football	Gymnastics	Girls Soccer
Girls Golf	Boys & Girls Hockey	Girls Softball
Boys Soccer	Boys Swimming and Diving	Boys Tennis
Girls Swimming and Diving	Boys & Girls Wrestling	Boys & Girls Track
Girls Tennis	Dance Team	Boys & Girls Lacrosse
Girls Volleyball C-Team	Hockey Cheerleading	
Girls Volleyball	Basketball Cheerleading	
Football Cheerleading		

All activities listed include a Varsity and Junior Varsity team (unless otherwise specified) except Girls Hockey and Track which only have Varsity teams.

=== Athletic conference affiliation history ===
- Lake Superior Conference (1983-1999, 2000-present)
- Big Rivers Conference (2002–present, football only)

== Scholarship opportunities ==
Many scholarship are also available for students planning to attend two-year or four-year higher learning institutions. The Superior Scholarship Foundation administers many, with the largest being the Victor and Mary D. Nelson Scholarship, which grants scholarships worth up to $6,000. This requires an in-depth application, writing sample, interview, and references.

Many local businesses, organizations, and alumni have, and continue to contribute scholarships to Superior High School students.

== Marching Band ==
The Superior High School Marching Band performs under the direction of Daniel Eaton, and performs at many events, such as:

- Basketball
- Hockey
- Football
- Marching in Parades(4th of July, Christmas City of the North Parade)
- Although very rarely, swimming competitions
- Played for Joe Biden when he visited University of Wisconsin Superior (List of presidential trips made by Joe Biden (2022))

The band is nicknamed "The Blue Machine" by both members of the band and the families of the members. At the end of every football game and sporting event, the band plays the school song, "Columbia Blue and White".

== Notable alumni ==
- Morrie Arnovich, MLB outfielder, played for the Philadelphia Phillies, the Cincinnati Reds and the New York Giants
- Niko Bogojevic, professional wrestler
- Esther Bubley, photojournalist, contributor to Life and Ladies' Home Journal; captured thousands of photographs for the Farm Security Administration during the 1940s and 1950s
- Bud Engdahl, professional basketball player; attended when it was still Superior Central High School
- Alphonse Emil “Tuffy” Leeman was a New York Giants fullback and halfback and played offense and defense in the NFL
- Bruce Mathison, NFL quarterback, played for the San Diego Chargers, the Buffalo Bills and the Seattle Seahawks
- Doug Sutherland, NFL player, played for the New Orleans Saints, the Minnesota Vikings and the Seattle Seahawks
- Oliver E. Williamson, recipient of the 2009 Nobel Memorial Prize in Economic Sciences; attended Central High School in 1950
- Bud Grant American/Canadian professional football player and Hall of Fame coach
