= Proctor High School =

Location
- 131 Ninth Avenue; Proctor, Minnesota 55810; United States
- 46.7438°N 92.23662°W

Information
- Type: Public
- Established: 1912
- School code: 704
- Dean: Nicole Applewick
- Principal: John Awsumb
- Staff: 34.33 (FTE)
- Grades: 9–12
- Enrollment: 540 (2024-2025)
- Student to teacher ratio: 15.73
- Colors: Dark green and white
- Slogan: Railstrong
- Mascot: Rowdy Rail
- Affiliation: MSHSL Section 7
- Website: hs.proctor.k12.mn.us

Proctor High School is a 9–12 secondary school in Proctor, Minnesota, United States, that was established in 1912.

Proctor High School is situated in the Duluth–Superior area.

== Notable alumni ==
- Garry Bjorklund - runner, holds high school State Meet record for the one-mile run, marathon runner, Olympic runner, Grandma's Half-Marathon is named in his honor.
- Dan Devine - head football coach at Missouri, Arizona State, Notre Dame and for the Green Bay Packers.
- Scott Jurek - runner, six-time defending champion of the Western States 100 Mile Endurance Run, ultra running's premiere 100 Mile event.
- Tom MacLeod - professional American football player
- Gena Lee Nolin - actress and model, best known for her television appearances on The Price Is Right and Baywatch in the 1990s; moved from Proctor while in junior high school.
- Dick Pesonen - professional American football player
- John Ward - Minnesota state representative of District 12A
