= Maple (disambiguation) =

Maple is a genus of trees and shrubs in the family Aceraceae.

Maple may also refer to:

== Science and technology ==
- Flowering maple or Abutilon, a genus of shrubs in the family Malvaceae
- Maple (software), a mathematics software package developed by Waterloo Maple
- Maple BBS, a telnet-based bulletin board system developed in Taiwan
- Multipurpose Applied Physics Lattice Experiment, a medical isotope production reactor
- Maple tree is a computer data structure used in the Linux kernel

== Places ==
=== Canada ===
- Maple, Ontario, an unincorporated settlement
  - Maple GO Station, a train and bus station
- Maple, Edmonton, a neighborhood of Edmonton, Alberta
- Maple Airport, a defunct airport in Ontario
- Maple Mountain (Ontario)

=== United States ===
- Maple, Bailey County, Texas, an unincorporated community
- Maple, Dallas, a neighborhood of Dallas, Texas
- Maple, Minnesota, an unincorporated community
- Maple Shade Township, New Jersey, a town in Burlington County
- Maple, West Virginia, an unincorporated community
- Maple, Wisconsin, a town in Douglas County
- Maple (community), Wisconsin, an unincorporated community in Douglas County

==== Bodies of water ====
- Maple Lake (Douglas County, Minnesota)
- Maple Lake (Polk County), Minnesota
- Maple River (Iowa), a tributary of the Little Sioux River in the U.S. state of Iowa
- Maple River (Michigan), any of three rivers in the U.S. state of Michigan
- Maple River (Minnesota), a tributary of the Le Sueur River in the U.S. state of Minnesota
- Maple River (North Dakota), a tributary of the Red River of the North in the U.S. state of North Dakota
- Maple River (South Dakota), a river of South Dakota

== Organisations ==
- Maple Club, a multi-sport club in Barbados
- Maple Energy, an integrated independent energy company in Peru
- Shanghai Maple, an auto manufacturer
- Maple & Co. (also known as Maples), a London-based furniture retailer
- The Maple, a Canadian left-wing news publication
- Hiroshima Maple Reds, Japanese handball club

== People ==
- Maple (surname)
- Maple (gamer), League of Legends player Huang Yi-Tang

== Ships ==
- USCGC Maple (WLB-207), a United States Coast Guard Seagoing Buoy Tender
- USS Maple (1893), a US Navy /US Lighthouse Service tender
- USS Maple (YN-20), renamed as USS Hackberry (AN-25) when launched in 1941

== Other uses ==
- "Maple" (song), by Shizuka Kudo, 2002
- Maple (TV series), an Iranian television series
- Maple, one of the Geographic Beanie Babies
- Maple syrup, a food flavouring
- Operation Maple, a mine-laying operation in support of Operation Overlord (D-Day)
- Maple (mascot), one of the mascots of the 2026 FIFA World Cup

== See also ==
- Kaede (disambiguation), Japanese word for "maple"
- Maple Township (disambiguation)
- Maples (disambiguation)
