= Maples =

Maples may refer to:

- Maple trees

== People ==
- Chauncy Maples (1852–1895), British Anglican missionary and bishop in Africa
- Fred Calvin Maples (1910–1987), American Southern gospel singer
- John Maples (cricketer) (1913–1958), English cricketer
- John Maples, Baron Maples (1943–2012), British politician
- Jon Maples, American politician
- Josiah Maples (~1819–1878), American slave trader
- Marla Maples (born 1963), American socialite
- Michael D. Maples (born 1949), American military officer and former director of the Defense Intelligence Agency
- William R. Maples (1937–1997), American anthropologist
- William Maples (cricketer) (1820–1854), English Imperial civil servant and cricketer

== Places ==
- Maples (Middletown, Delaware), listed on the U.S. National Register of Historic Places in Delaware
- Maples, Indiana, a small town in the United States
- Maples, Missouri, an unincorporated community

== Schools ==
- Maples Collegiate, a public high school in Winnipeg, Manitoba

== Other uses ==
- Maples baronets, a title in the Baronetage of England
- Maples Group (formerly Maples and Calder), an international law firm advising on the laws of the Cayman Islands, Ireland and the British Virgin Islands
- Maples Cottage, a historic cottage in Westborough, Massachusetts
- Maples Inn (disambiguation), various inns
- Maples Pavilion, an arena in Stanford, California
- Maples v. Thomas, a U.S. Supreme Court ruling
- Maple & Co. (also known as Maples), a London-based furniture retailer

== See also ==
- Maple (disambiguation)
- The Maples (disambiguation)
