= Crosfield =

Crosfield is a surname. Notable people with the surname include:

- Sir Arthur Crosfield, 1st Baronet (1865–1938), British politician
- Domini Crosfield (died 1963), British politician
- John Crosfield (1915–2012), English businessman and inventor
- Joseph Crosfield (1792–1844), English businessman
- Margaret Crosfield (1859–1952), English palaeontologist and geologist
- Paul Crosfield (1929–2000), Greek hurdler
- Philip Crosfield (1924–2013), British Anglican priest
- Sydney Crosfield (1861–1908), English cricketer
- William Crosfield (1838–1909), British politician

== See also ==
- Crosfield Electronics, British electronics company
- Crossfield (disambiguation)
- Crisfield (surname)
