= Poplar, Wisconsin =

- Village
- Location of Poplar in Douglas County, Wisconsin.
- Coordinates: 46°34′55″N 91°47′37″W
- Country: United States
- State: Wisconsin
- County: Douglas

Area
  - Total: 11.91 sq mi (30.84 km^{2})
  - Land: 11.88 sq mi (30.77 km^{2})
  - Water: 0.031 sq mi (0.08 km^{2})
- Elevation: 981 ft (299 m)

Population (2020)
  - Total: 629
  - Density: 52.9/sq mi (20.4/km^{2})
- Time zone: UTC-6 (Central (CST))
  - Summer (DST): UTC-5 (CDT)
- ZIP codes: 54864
- Area codes: 715 and 534
- FIPS code: 55-63975
- GNIS feature ID: 1571768
- Website: https://villageofpoplar.com/

Poplar is a village in Douglas County, Wisconsin, United States. The population was 629 at the 2020 census, an increase from 603 at the 2010 census.

U.S. Highway 2, County Road D, and County Road P are the main routes in the community.

== Geography ==
Poplar is located at 46°34′55″N 91°47′37″W (46.582014, -91.793712).

According to the United States Census Bureau, the village has a total area of 11.93 square miles (30.90 km^{2}), of which 11.90 square miles (30.82 km^{2}) is land and 0.03 square miles (0.08 km^{2}) is water.

Poplar is located 18 miles east of its county seat, the city of Superior.

== Demographics ==
Historical population
Census	Pop.	Note	%±
1920	357		—
1930	449		25.8%
1940	462		2.9%
1950	489		5.8%
1960	475		−2.9%
1970	455		−4.2%
1980	569		25.1%
1990	516		−9.3%
2000	552		7.0%
2010	603		9.2%
2020	629		4.3%
U.S. Decennial Census

=== 2010 census ===
As of the census of 2010, there were 603 people, 229 households, and 172 families living in the village. The population density was 50.7 inhabitants per square mile (19.6/km^{2}). There were 254 housing units at an average density of 21.3 per square mile (8.2/km^{2}). The racial makeup of the village was 94.5% White, 0.3% African American, 1.7% Native American, 1.2% Asian, 0.2% from other races, and 2.2% from two or more races.

There were 229 households, of which 37.1% had children under the age of 18 living with them, 59.8% were married couples living together, 9.2% had a female householder with no husband present, 6.1% had a male householder with no wife present, and 24.9% were non-families. 18.8% of all households were made up of individuals, and 9.6% had someone living alone who was 65 years of age or older. The average household size was 2.63 and the average family size was 2.91.

The median age in the village was 39 years. 26.9% of residents were under the age of 18; 6.7% were between the ages of 18 and 24; 24.8% were from 25 to 44; 25.9% were from 45 to 64; and 15.6% were 65 years of age or older. The gender makeup of the village was 49.6% male and 50.4% female.

=== 2000 census ===
As of the census of 2000, there were 552 people, 209 households, and 152 families living in the village. The population density was 46.3 people per square mile (17.9/km^{2}). There were 222 housing units at an average density of 18.6 per square mile (7.2/km^{2}). The racial makeup of the village was 98.37% White, 1.27% Native American, and 0.36% from two or more races. Hispanic or Latino of any race were 0.36% of the population.

There were 209 households, out of which 34.0% had children under the age of 18 living with them, 68.4% were married couples living together, 2.4% had a female householder with no husband present, and 26.8% were non-families. 22.5% of all households were made up of individuals, and 9.6% had someone living alone who was 65 years of age or older. The average household size was 2.64 and the average family size was 3.14.

In the village, the population was spread out, with 29.3% under the age of 18, 3.8% from 18 to 24, 28.3% from 25 to 44, 25.4% from 45 to 64, and 13.2% who were 65 years of age or older. The median age was 39 years. For every 100 females, there were 100.0 males. For every 100 females age 18 and over, there were 100.0 males.

The median income for a household in the village was $41,406, and the median income for a family was $51,406. Males had a median income of $40,893 versus $21,154 for females. The per capita income for the village was $18,218. About 6.3% of families and 8.7% of the population were below the poverty line, including 6.5% of those under age 18 and 14.3% of those age 65 or over.

== Education ==
The Maple School District serves Poplar. Northwestern Elementary School and Northwestern Middle School are in Poplar. Northwestern High School is in neighboring Maple.

== Notable people ==
- Richard I. Bong – United States Air Force, Ace of Aces
- Tom Burke – NFL football player
- Bob Jauch - Wisconsin State Senator

== Sister cities ==
Poplar's sister cities are:

- Madang, Papua New Guinea
