= Crisfield (surname) =

Crisfield is a surname. Notable people with the surname include:

- Henry Crisfield (1877–1945), Australian rules footballer
- John W. Crisfield (1806–1897), American politician
- Michael Anthony Crisfield (1942–2002), British mathematician

== See also ==
- Crosfield (surname)
