= William Maples =

William Maples may refer to:

- William R. Maples (1937–1997), American forensic anthropologist
- William Maples (cricketer) (1820–1854), English cricketer
