= Crossfield =

Crossfield is a surname. Notable people with the surname include:

- Albert Scott Crossfield (1921–2006), American naval officer and test pilot
- Ian Crossfield, American astronomer and associate professor of physics and astronomy
- Richard Crossfield (1868–1951), American minister, theologian and an educational reformer

== See also ==
- Crosfield, surname
- Crossfield, Alberta
