= John Crosfield =

English inventor and entrepreneur

John Fothergill Crosfield CBE DSc MA
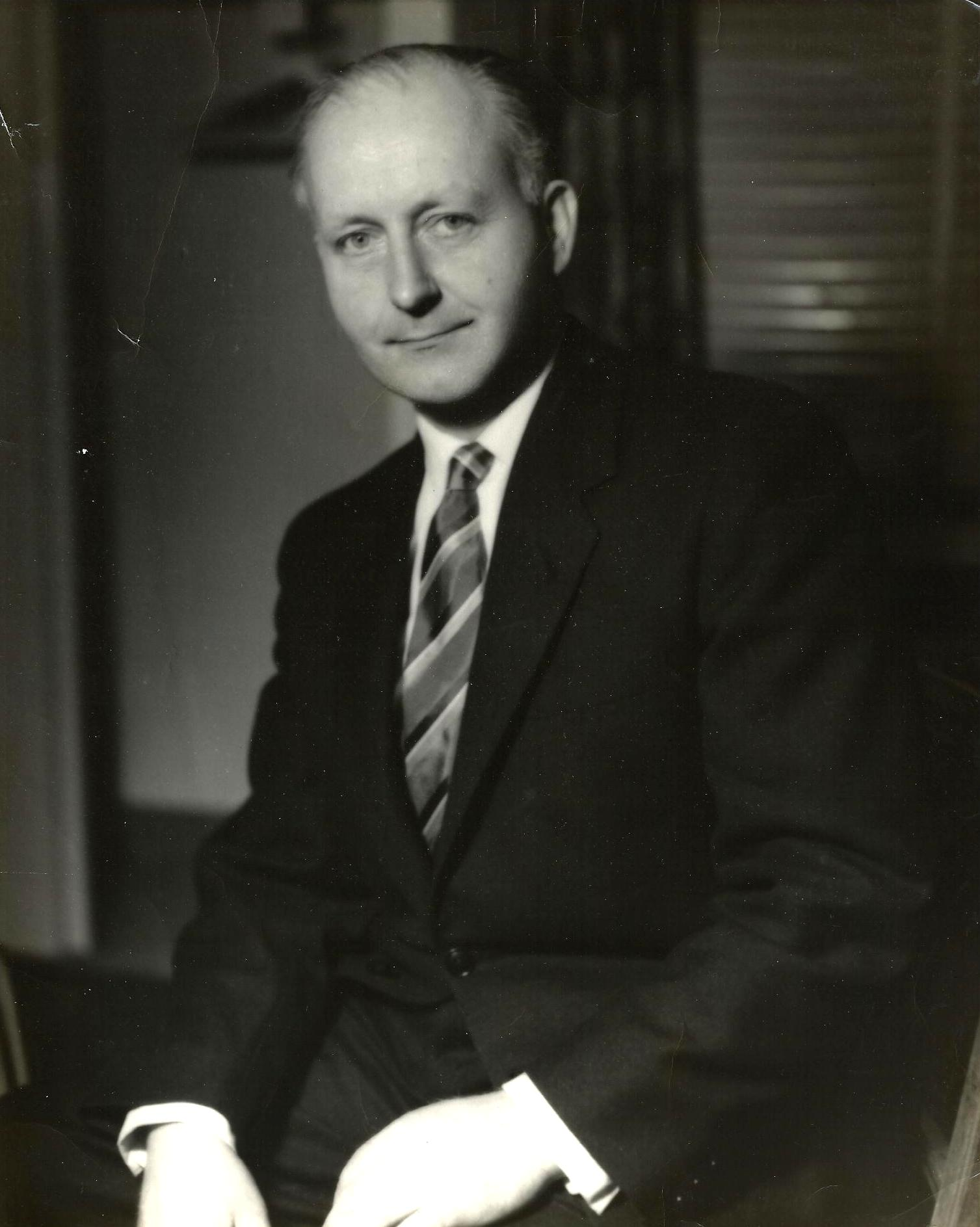
- John Crosfield in 1950
- Born: 22 October 1915; London, England
- Died: 25 March 2012 (aged 96); Hampstead, London, England
- Resting place: Highgate Cemetery
- Citizenship: British
- Education: Cambridge University
- Occupations: Inventor, entrepreneur
- Years active: 1936-1991

John Fothergill Crosfield CBE DSc MA (22 October 1915 in Hampstead, London – 25 March 2012 in Hampstead, London) was an English inventor and entrepreneur. He was a pioneer in the application of electronics to all aspects of colour printing and the inventor of the acoustic and subsonic mines during the World War II.

Graduating with a degree in mechanical sciences from Cambridge University in 1936, Crosfield was working on electrical lifts for ASEA in Sweden when war was declared. He joined the Admiralty, where with a team of mathematicians and engineers he was charged with developing sonar, to detect midget submarines and new types of mines.

In 1947, Crosfield founded J F Crosfield Ltd. (later Crosfield Electronics Ltd.) to develop press control equipment The first product was the Autotron, that enabled magazines to print economically in colour. Following this, the company played a leading role in the introduction of colour scanning in 1958, phototypesetting and later the automated composition of pages incorporating pictures and text, a 1970s precursor to Photoshop. He founded Crosfield Business Machines Ltd. in 1966 to develop and produce banknote inspection, counting and sorting machines. The companies won 4 Queens Awards for Technology and Exports. De La Rue acquired the Crosfield businesses in 1974.

In 1971, Crosfield was appointed a CBE for Services to Industry. He was a board member of De La Rue, Baker Perkins and the Scientific Instruments Research Association until 1985. Crosfield researched and wrote The Crosfield Family, The Cadbury Family and, in 1991, Recollections of Crosfield Electronics 1947 to 1975. He installed an electron-microscope in his studio, using it to scan and image microscopic insect and plant life from his garden. He used these images as the inspiration for surreal but fascinating paintings.

Crosfield was noted for his generosity, giving away most of the fruits of his success in his lifetime. He was widely read, a good conversationalist and always interested in the exploits of his large, extended family and his many friends and their offspring. After a short illness, he died at his home at the age of 96.

== Early life, family and education ==
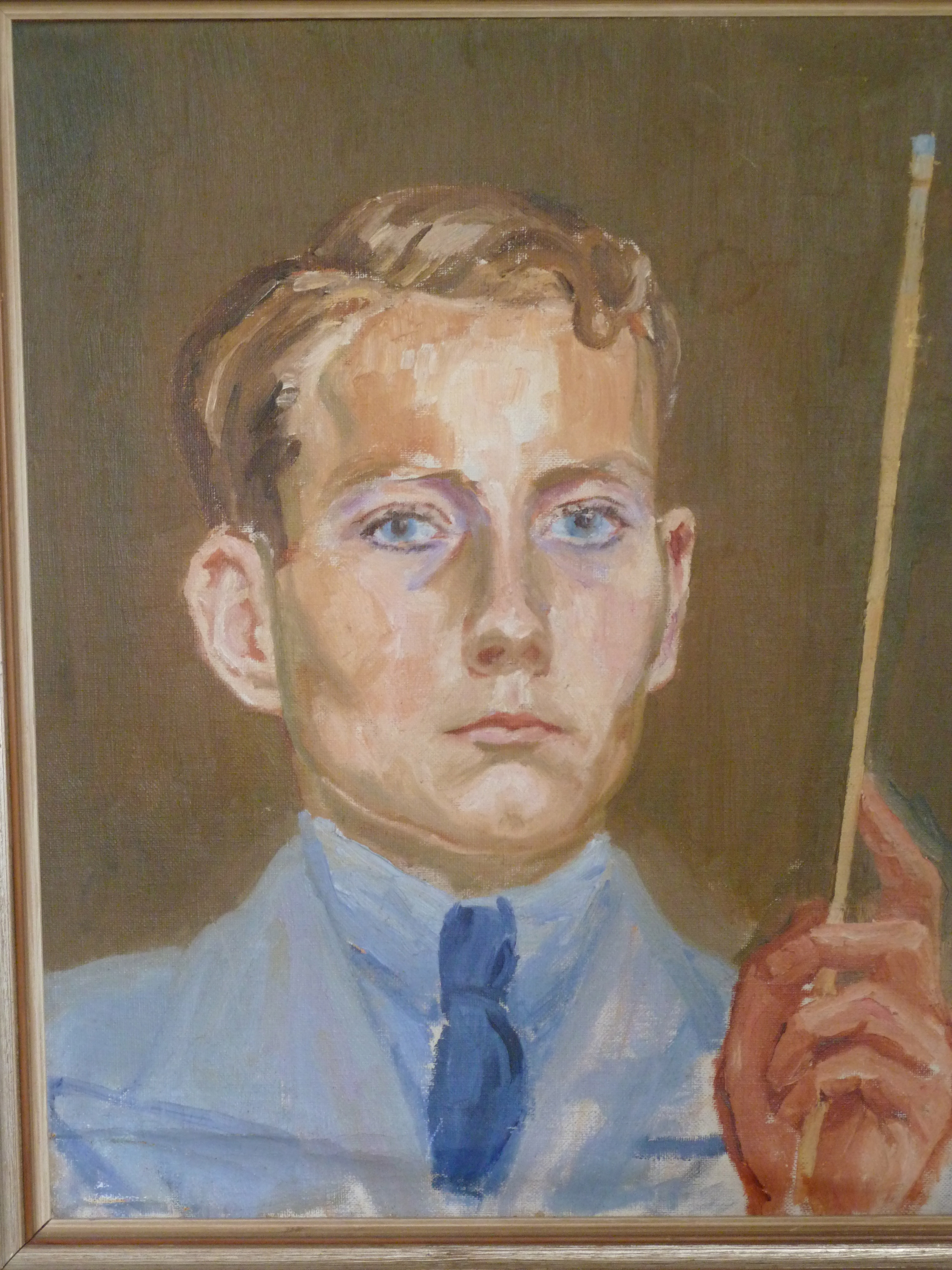
Self-portrait by John Crosfield 1931, aged 15. Oil on canvas.

Crosfield was the third child and second son of a family of prominent Quakers. His father, Bertram Fothergill Crosfield (1882–1951), was managing director and co-proprietor of the liberal dailies The News Chronicle and The Star, president of the Mid-Bucks Liberal Association and Clerk of the Meeting at Jordans Meeting House. John Crosfield's mother, Eleanor Cadbury (1885–1959), was a daughter of the chocolate manufacturer and Quaker George Cadbury. She was well known locally as a magistrate, elected as a Liberal to Bucks County Council, and for her work in local charities and political associations.

John Crosfield was born at Grove Lodge in Hampstead, London in 1915, the third of six children. As the house was too small for his growing family, his father sold Grove Lodge to the novelist John Galsworthy in 1918 and they moved to Buckinghamshire, on the outskirts of Beaconsfield. From a very young age, he had a passion for making things. In the family workshop he made boats, steam engines, jigsaw puzzles and a cannon that he tested on the garage door. The shot went straight through the door and through his father's beloved Daimler. At prep school he and his friends built a model railway through the school grounds. At public school he built an O gauge model railway with a friend and with another friend linked two of the houses with a telephone line and exchanges for their respective studies. He played second violin for the school orchestra, but dropped music in favour of painting and model making.

While his early schooling was idyllic, he was bullied and hated the bad food and harsh discipline at the Downs School, where he was sent as a border at the age of nine. The boys slept in three-sided huts with the fourth side open to the elements and here he contracted pneumonia followed by pleural empyema. He was ten years old and spent nearly a year recuperating at the Cadbury holiday home, Winds Point, high in the Malvern Hills. At thirteen, Crosfield went to Leighton Park School, a Quaker school in Reading, where his father had been head boy. He liked physics and maths and Crosfield chose to study engineering. He went up to Trinity College, Cambridge, where his father had also read mechanical sciences. Crosfield was a founder member of the university's Gliding Club, where the flyers developed what they believed to be the first successful winch launch, using an old Buick they adapted for that purpose. Although Crosfield enjoyed Cambridge to the full, with parties, sports (rowing, squash, golf and gliding) and high jinks, he worked hard, noting he had 27 hours of lectures and workshops a week compared to 6 hours for some of his friends. He graduated in 1936 and spent six weeks in Munich to improve his German. Here he was shocked by the virulence of anti-Semitic propaganda, the thin and haggard political prisoners he passed building new autobahns and by Hitler's hate-filled yet strangely mesmerising radio speeches. On his return to England, he found that his reports of what was going on in Germany were met with disbelief.

== Apprenticeship and war years ==
After Cambridge, Crosfield joined the British Thomson-Houston Company (BTH) at Rugby as a student apprentice, where he worked in departments testing electric motors, turbines and generators, and in the drafting, design and estimating departments. Adjoining the turbine department, where the monotony of the production line exasperated him, was Frank Whittle's laboratory. Crosfield sneaked in to see the first prototype of a jet engine. Frustrated at being stuck for six months in the drafting department, Crosfield left BTH in February 1938 to continue his apprenticeship at ASEA, based in their headquarters in Västeräs, Sweden. The summer of 1939 found him in Stockholm at one of ASEA's companies making electric lifts. He was on a painting holiday in the Skärgäden when he heard that the Luftwaffe had bombed Warsaw. After a false start he reached Newcastle by boat from Bergen and, as he had sailed in the Baltic, he volunteered for the Navy. He had to wait for his papers and ASEA gave him a job to install a newspaper drive at Manchester for Allied Newspapers, his first work on a printing press. Crosfield was impatient to get into the Navy, where he wanted to join a fighting ship. He explained his frustration to an acquaintance at the Institution of Electrical Engineers, who referred him to a friend in the Admiralty.

In February 1940, the Admiralty assigned Crosfield to the Mine Design Department HMS Vernon at Portsmouth. The first assignment he completed was to design equipment for detecting midget submarines at Britain's harbour entrances. He was then charged with designing a magnetometer to measure a ship's magnetic field, but he realised that magnetic mines were useless against German E-Boats (motor torpedo boats) that were built with wooden hulls. So he started work on an acoustic mine that worked on the sound emitted by a ship's propeller. He had made a prototype and started testing it when Commander Brown called him in and told him to get back to the magnetometer. He ignored the order and, "with improved security", continued the development of the acoustic mine. This became an official priority after a British destroyer, which had been 'degaussed' and was therefore impervious to magnetic mines, set off a mine in the Thames Estuary. With the help of a mathematician and much testing he overcame the technical obstacles. In its first use in the Baltic Sea, 200 of the new acoustic mines sank 47 enemy vessels and the Baltic was closed to shipping for two weeks. One of his colleagues at HMS Vernon was his friend and future Nobel Prize winner Francis Crick, who built up a little organization which modified mines to meet new tactical requirements.

Crosfield's superior, the mathematical physicist Professor Harrie Massey, asked him to do a special job for the Normandy landings. Crosfield and his team developed a new acoustic and subsonic mine. He was put in charge of producing enough of them for the RAF by 15 May 1944. He found that the four depots assembling mines were chaotically run. By commandeering a lorry to move parts to where they were needed, sending in his engineers to control stock and quality and convincing the manager of the Milford Haven depot to deploy eight of his secretarial staff together with six of the Admiralty's mathematicians on the production line, they met their target. The new mines were dropped by the RAF in the Kiel Canal, the Straits of Dover and the Western Approaches (Operation Maple and Operation Bravado), with the result that very few German vessels were able to reach and attack the invasion fleet. The Admiralty awarded Crosfield 500 pounds for his invention, and with this he bought his first house at Emsworth.

== Crosfield Electronics Limited (CEL) ==
=== Origins ===
After the war, Crosfield writes, "We worked on a number of research projects at ASEA, some of which seemed very good to me, but they were not appreciated by management and very little was going into production. I was earning a good salary, but I felt that if I stayed there my life would be wasted. So I decided to start up on my own account." In 1947, Crosfield set up a laboratory in the attic of his house in Hampstead Garden Suburb, London to develop two new projects. He learnt that the commercial banks wanted equipment to automatically sort cheques to replace the large number of staff engaged in cheque sorting. He developed a cheque sorting machine designing magnetic characters that could be read photo-electrically. But when Barclays Bank produced a huge cheque they wanted his machine to sort and, as cheque sizes were not standardized, Crosfield realised it wasn't practical to continue with the project. Working with his first employee, Dennis Bent, who lived at the Crosfield home, the second project was a success. Magazines could not print in four colours and keep them in register (alignment) as this depended entirely on manual braking by machine operators. Quality was poor and paper wastage high. Crosfield's former ASEA manager and friend, Niels Haglov, asked him if this could be resolved. Crosfield worked out a photo-electric control system to do it automatically on web-fed presses, thereby improving the quality of colour printing and reducing paper waste from 25% to 4 or 5%. The printer of Women's Illustrated allowed them to try the new colour register control, dubbed the Autotron, on their rotogravure press. Although they "sweated blood for 18 months" they got it working and the word spread around the printing industry. Crosfield's first customer (1950) was The Melbourne Herald, and soon Crosfield was shipping Autotrons around the world.

=== Press control equipment ===
The Autotron spurred spinoffs: the Secatron (1954) for carton makers to ensure their pictures were centred; the Webatron for bag making machines; the Trakatron (1953) for the special requirements of cellophane and paper printers, and the Inkatron (1960) for sheet-fed offset presses. At the request of Sun Printers, Crosfield developed the Idotron (1956) to control ink viscosity, later superseded by the Viscomex (1959). In 1953 the technical director of Axel Springer, Germany's largest newspaper publisher, asked Crosfield to design equipment that would allow Springer to first print coloured illustrations, including advertising, in rotogravure and then re-reel to print the text on web offset. This led to the Insetter (1958) that revolutionised newspaper printing by permitting the economical use of colour. The Synchroscope gave machine minders the capacity to visualise images as they were being printed. In the US, Gravure Research Inc. commissioned Crosfield to develop equipment to stop "speckling", undesirable white flecks in shadow areas. In 1966 the Heliostat, which applied an electric charge of several thousand volts to attract ink to paper, appeared. By then Crosfield had the support of a team of talented researchers, installation engineers, a production facility and sales and administrative staff.

=== Colour scanners ===
In the early 1950s Sun Printers asked Crosfield if he could design an electronic machine to do the job of retouchers (skilled artists who reworked the contact print of the film negatives so that a 4-colour ink process would produce a good quality print on paper). Sun was expanding its facilities for colour printing but, due to trade union restrictions, the company could not hire and train enough retouchers. Crosfield thought it a very difficult task, but Sun offered to pay half the R & D costs and Crosfield "decided to have a go". He built a new research team and rented premises at Old Street for the laboratory to develop the colour scanner. The first Scanatron appeared in 1958. By then CEL had a large back order for scanners from rotogravure printers in Europe and the US. Colour scanners became the biggest money earner for the company and Crosfield continued their development, launching the Diascan, an improved and cheaper model in 1965 and the enlarging Magnascan in 1969. This machine scanned a colour slide and had all the equipment and software necessary to adjust the size, form, colour and hue to get the desired result for the publisher. The Magnascan's launch at the Milan printing fair caused a sensation. The company continued development of scanners, bringing out new models that improved the versatility, quality and productivity of earlier versions. High quality colour printing was now common in catalogues, magazines and newspapers around the world.

=== Crosfield Business Machines ===
Ten years after Crosfield's frustrated attempt to design a cheque sorting machine, the Scottish banks came to Crosfield and asked him to build a banknote sorting machine. The American equipment then used for cheque sorting could not handle the soft, light paper of used, sometimes sticky banknotes. In 1959, Crosfield set up a team of engineers at Fortress Road, London, and in 1964 they produced the first banknote sorting machines for the Scottish banks. He used optical character recognition and a new patented process for handling small, flimsy pieces of paper, called the 'Double curvature sheet feeder'. The banknote sorter was followed by machines for sorting and reading luncheon vouchers, postal orders and lottery tickets and for counting and dispensing banknotes. In 1966 Crosfield spun this new division off as Crosfield Business Machines, with its own management, offices, production and research in Watford. New equipment, built first for Nord West Lotto in Germany, coupled to small computers automatically printed out a list of prize winners and the weekly profit and tax liability for the lottery. Simultaneously a high-speed camera made a microfilm of the coupons as a security check. A few machines replaced hundreds of production staff. Another development, a sorting machine and 'garbler', first installed for the Dutch Central Bank, sorted good used banknotes from bad and bundled the good while shredding the bad, a task that formerly required a staff of thousands.

=== Financing CEL ===
Crosfield founded his company with 2,000 pounds of his own savings, but these were soon exhausted. His father refused to help, but his brother Edward and sisters Margaret and Rachel put up 2,500 pounds that saw him through the first three years, until he made his first sale of an Autotron. He relied on advance payments from customers and a bank overdraft to fund the growing needs of CEL, dipping into his own bank account for emergencies. In 1959 he brought his cousin, Ken Wilson, into the business, with Wilson putting up 10,000 pounds to buy 15% of the company and 14,000 pounds as a loan. Six years later, requiring further funding, Hambros Bank bought out Ken Wilson's shares and provided a further loan. In 1971, after Crosfield had rejected Hambro's proposal to merge CEL with Muirheads, the merchant bank Keyser Ullman bought Hambro's shares.

=== Frustrated stock market listing and sale to De La Rue Ltd. ===
In the spring of 1974, CEL, with 1,300 employees, was ready for a public listing on the London Stock Exchange. The company had increased sales from 3.6 million to 10.6 million pounds and profits from 0.2 million to 1.0 million pounds in the preceding 5 years. 85% of sales went abroad, with the US and Japan its largest markets, and CEL was a world leader in press control and colour scanner equipment. Bank borrowings had increased from 0.2 million to 1.1 million pounds in the same period and, although net equity had increased fourfold to 2.1 million pounds, the company required a larger capital base to finance production to satisfy the soaring demand for its colour scanners. The Stock Market crashed, the FTSE 30 losing 73% of its value, all new issues were pulled and the company found itself in a quandary: in this period of uncertainty neither banks nor Government were willing to make a loan to CEL. To ensure its future, Crosfield sold the company to De La Rue for 6 million pounds in September 1974. This proved to be an excellent investment for De La Rue. In 1988, just the scanner business of CEL made an operating profit of 21 million pounds on sales of 210 million. De La Rue sold the colour scanning business to a joint venture of Fuji and DuPont for 235 million pounds in 1989.

=== Later years ===
As a main board member of De La Rue through to 1985, and Honorary President of CEL thereafter, Crosfield maintained a close interest in the development of the businesses. At the request of the Chairman of CEL, he wrote a history of the company that was published in 1991 as Recollections of Crosfield Electronics 1947-1975. Recollections is more about the people who made CEL than anything else, reflecting Crosfield's essentially people-orientated approach to both research and business. His staff responded with loyalty and dedication, without which his venture would not have succeeded.

In 2000, former CEL employees formed the John Crosfield Foundation as a charitable trust to assist young people in furthering their education in the graphic arts.

== Personal life ==
=== Family ===
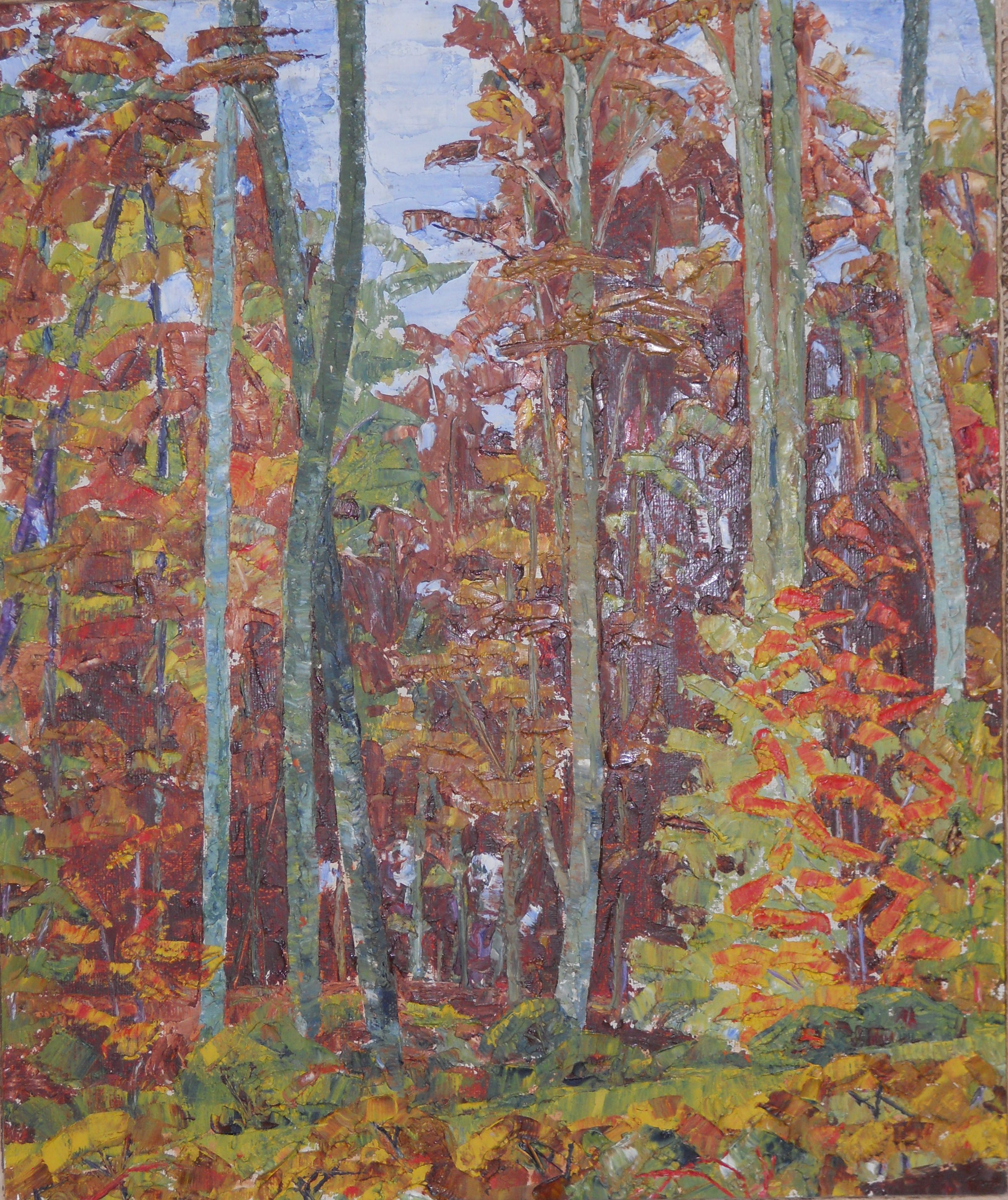
Beechwood by John Crosfield 1931, aged 15. Oil and palette knife on canvas

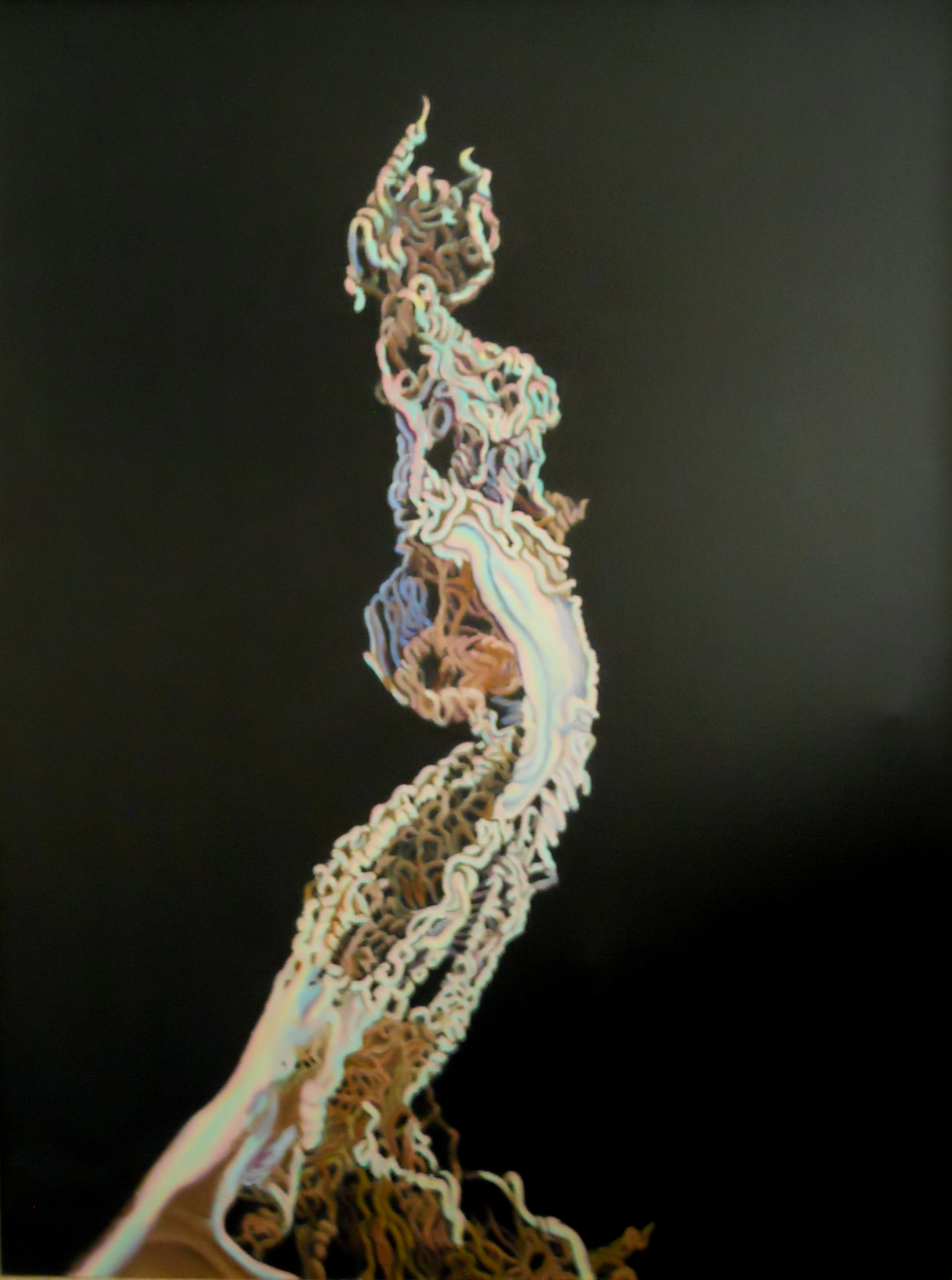
Ammonium Carbonate Crystal X 10,000 by John Crosfield, 1980. Oil on canvas

Crosfield married Geraldine Fitzgerald of Lockport, New York (1915-1987), where her father was a prominent surgeon, in 1938, and they had a son, Robin Braden Fitzgerald (b. 1939). After a lengthy separation caused by the war, they were divorced in 1945. In 1945, Crosfield married Edythe Miriam Bertinet (1917-2009) of Rockville Centre, New York and they had three children: Richard John (b. 1946), Eleanor Miriam (b. 1949) and James Michael (b. 1951). Their marriage lasted 64 years. She supported him in difficult times and she organised their active social life that they both so enjoyed.

Crosfield had a strong sense of family. He corresponded with his mother from schooldays through to his first marriage and enjoyed frequent family gatherings. After his mother's death in 1959, he remained close to his brothers and sisters and their children and, eventually, to their grandchildren. On leaving full-time employment in 1975, he devoted years to researching, writing and editing two large family histories. These brought him into contact with distant relations, including the American branches of the Crosfield and Cadbury families. He published The Crosfield Family in 1980 (revised and updated in 1990) and The Cadbury Family in 1986.

=== Painting ===
Crosfield's youthful oil paintings showed promise. His interest in art was awakened by Maurice "Grassy" Field, his art master at the Downs School, when he was 11. By the age of 15 (around 1930) his landscape oils show the influence of Impressionism. His father, himself an amateur painter, thought that his artistic talent and interest in engineering would best be served in architecture. Marriage, the war, starting his own business and his growing family left little time for painting, but when he returned to it seriously, his art reflected the change in artistic values. He was very interested in the development of abstract art and a frequent visitor to galleries. He had seen a scanning electron microscope in a Helsinki research institute and, in 1975, when he had the money and the time to use it, he bought one from Cambridge Scientific Instrument Company.

Crosfield was to be seen in his painter's smock at the top of Grove Lodge (his birthplace, which he had bought in 1965) preparing, scanning and photographing minute objects - insect parts, pollen, petals, crystals - that he subsequently reproduced in colour and in a much larger scale on canvas. Viewing nature magnified thousands of times "was like opening a door onto another planet." Though he sponsored an exhibition at a West End gallery, he did not receive the recognition he hoped for, and he abandoned the subject but not painting itself. He continued to paint landscapes, drawn from his extensive travels, and portraits, mainly for the family, until he packed up his paint box for the last time in April 2007, at the age of 91. Though these later paintings demonstrated his technical skill and, given that he projected slides onto his canvas, were very realistic, they did not show the feel for his subjects that he had demonstrated as a boy nor the originality of the sometimes surreal paintings based on what he saw through the viewfinder of the electron microscope.

=== Sailing ===
Crosfield was a keen sailor who bought his first boat in 1938, "an ancient sailing boat for about ten pounds", shared with a Dutch apprentice like himself at ASEA. They sailed her on Lake Mälaren. He bought another boat after the war and he chose a 25-foot catamaran, Orlando, because a catamaran's speed, unlike a monohull sailing vessel, is not limited by its overall length. For four years he sailed around the Solent and Isle of Wight, with his family and any friend who might be aboard as crew. In 1962 he had a hankering for a larger and faster boat and was taken with a 38-foot catamaran that had won the Round the Isle of Wight race against much larger boats. Snowgoose had been built by the Prout brothers but, "they seemed to have no idea how to build a family cruiser." Crosfield took a drawing board home and, using Snowgoose's hot moulded plywood hulls, designed her himself. The Prout brothers built Gemini and asked Crosfield if they could use his design for future customers. The Crosfield family sailed Gemini for ten years, first in the Thames estuary and the North Sea, and then in the Western Mediterranean. In 1972, Gemini hit a heavy object in strong winds off the coast of Corsica and was irreparably damaged. In 1975 Crosfield bought a summer house on the Salcombe estuary. For some years he sailed a Salcombe yawl.

=== Quaker influence ===
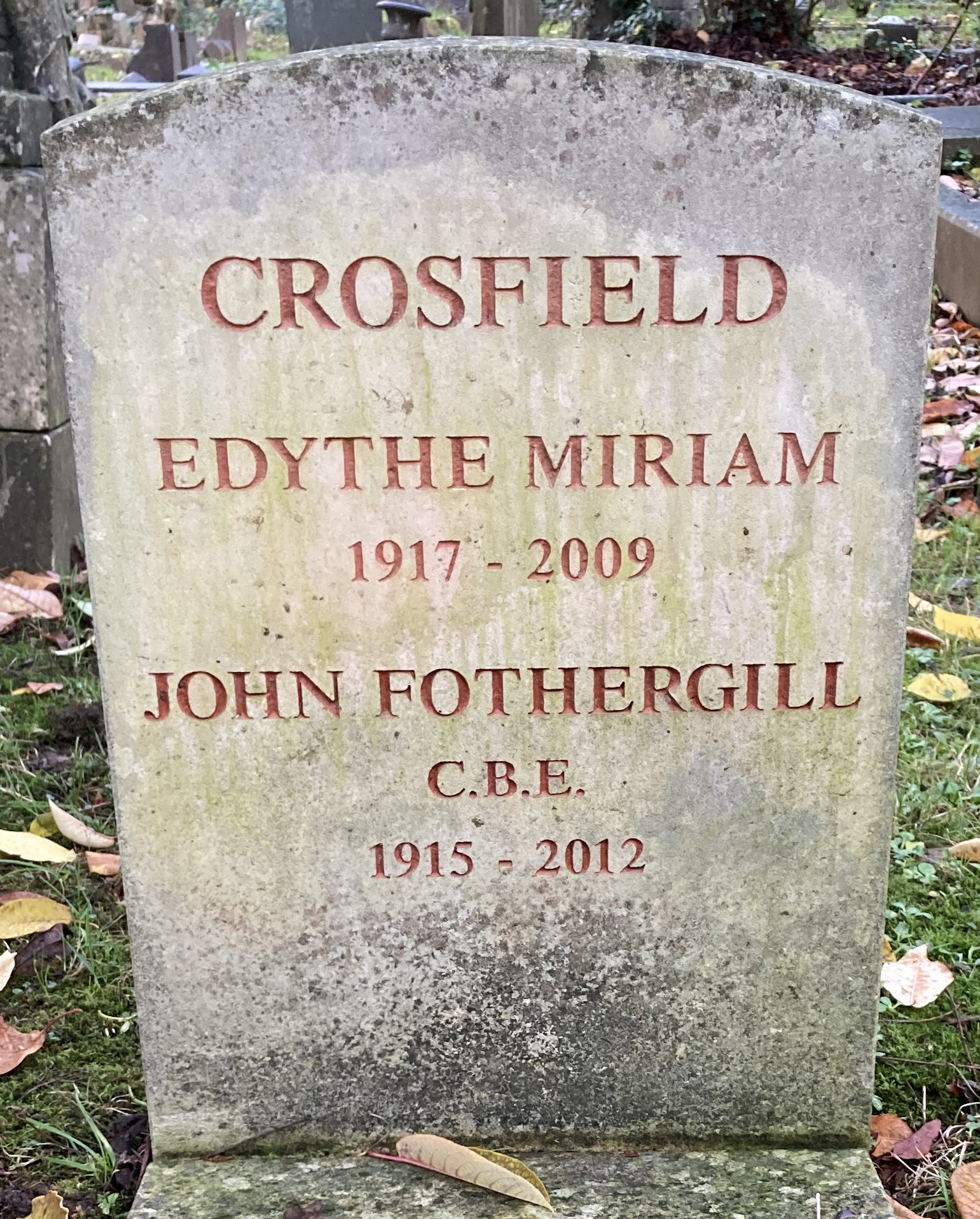
Grave of John Crosfield in Highgate Cemetery

Crosfield's maternal grandfather, George Cadbury, was a prominent Quaker whose public works included the building of the model town of Bournville for his employees. Crosfield's paternal grandfather, Albert Crosfield, devoted most of his life to the Society of Friends, spending nine years as Chairman of the Friends Foreign Mission Association. Crosfield's family were practising Quakers, and every Sunday they went to Jordans Meeting. The Quakers, as pacifists, were conscientious objectors in wartime. They abstained from alcohol and both his parents had taken the pledge not to touch it. Crosfield writes about champagne parties at Cambridge and he volunteered for the Navy soon after the outbreak of war. And Crosfield was an atheist, who did not keep his opinion to himself. Yet he held in high esteem the perceived Quaker values of honesty, probity, hard work, a strong social conscience and simplicity in personal matters.

Crosfield was a modest man. He bought most of his clothes at Marks and Spencer, he would travel only in economy, and he considered flamboyant cars a waste of money. Yet Crosfield was a generous man. After the sale to De La Rue, Crosfield set up a charitable trust with 75,000 pounds capital (closed in 2000 with its capital distributed to charities). Over the years he gave away most of his capital to family, friends and people he knew in need and to a large number of charities. These included the Voluntary Euthanasia Society and Dignity in Dying.

Crosfield detested discrimination of any kind, and Crosfield Electronics hired staff only for their ability. Crosfield was a long-standing member of Hampstead Golf Club, as was the former Prime Minister Harold Wilson. The Club did not admit Jews, but in the early 1960s Crosfield put up his friend and neighbour Leon Smulian, who was admitted. Crosfield said, "I put an end to that."

The Crosfield home was always open to friends who were ill or in need. Sometimes friends stayed with them for months and, in one case, for two years.

Crosfield died at home on 25th March 2012 and was buried with his wife on the eastern side of Highgate Cemetery.

== Honours and awards ==
- 1971 - Commander of the Order of the British Empire (CBE) for Services to Industry.
- 1973 - Gold Medal of the Institute of Printing
- 1980 - Doctor Honoris Causa, (DSc), Cranfield Institute of Technology
- 2010 - Champion of Print, International Printing Exhibition (IPEX)

Crosfield Electronics received Queen's Awards for Technology in 1967, 1972 and 1973 and the Queen's Award for Export in 1973.

== Publications ==
- The Crosfield Family: A history of the descendants of Thomas Crosfield of Kirkby Lonsdale who died in 1614 (Cambridge, England 1980, Revised Edition 1990) ISBN 0950734020
- A History of The Cadbury Family (Cambridge, England 1985) 2 Vols ISBN 0950734012
- Recollections of Crosfield Electronics 1947 to 1975 (Peterborough, England 1991) ISBN 0950734039
