= Richard I. Bong Airport =

- IATA: SUW; ICAO: KSUW; FAA LID: SUW

Summary
- Airport type: Public
- Owner: City of Superior
- Serves: Superior, Wisconsin
- Opened: October 1937
- Time zone: CST (UTC−06:00)
  - Summer (DST): CDT (UTC−05:00)
- Elevation AMSL: 674 ft / 205 m
- Coordinates: 46°41′23″N 092°05′41″W
- Public transit access: DTA

Map
- Location of airport in Wisconsin SUW (the United States)

Runways
Direction	Length		Surface
Direction	ft	m	Surface
4/22	5,100	1,554	Asphalt
14/32	4,001	1,220	Asphalt

Statistics
- Aircraft operations (2022): 19,250
- Based aircraft (2024): 46
- Source: Federal Aviation Administration

Richard I. Bong Airport (IATA: SUW, ICAO: KSUW, FAA LID: SUW) is a city-owned public-use airport located three nautical miles (6 km) south of the central business district of Superior, a city in Douglas County, Wisconsin, United States. It is included in the Federal Aviation Administration (FAA) National Plan of Integrated Airport Systems for 2025–2029, in which it is categorized as a local general aviation facility.

Also known as Richard I. Bong Memorial Airport, it is named after World War II fighter pilot Richard I. Bong, the highest scoring U.S. fighter ace in history.

== Facilities and aircraft ==
Richard I. Bong Airport covers an area of 654 acres (265 ha) at an elevation of 674 feet (205 m) above mean sea level. It has two asphalt paved runways: the primary runway 4/22 is 5,100 by 75 feet (1,554 x 23 m) and the crosswind runway 14/32 is 4,001 by 75 feet (1,220 x 23 m), all with approved GPS approaches.

For the 12-month period ending August 24, 2022, the airport had 19,250 aircraft operations, an average of 53 per day: 96% general aviation, 4% air taxi and less than 1% military. In August 2024, there were 46 aircraft based at this airport: 38 single-engine and 8 multi-engine.

The BONG (SUW) non-directional beacon, 260 kHz, is located on field.

== See also ==
- List of airports in Wisconsin
