= Richard Bong =

American fighter pilot (1920–1945)

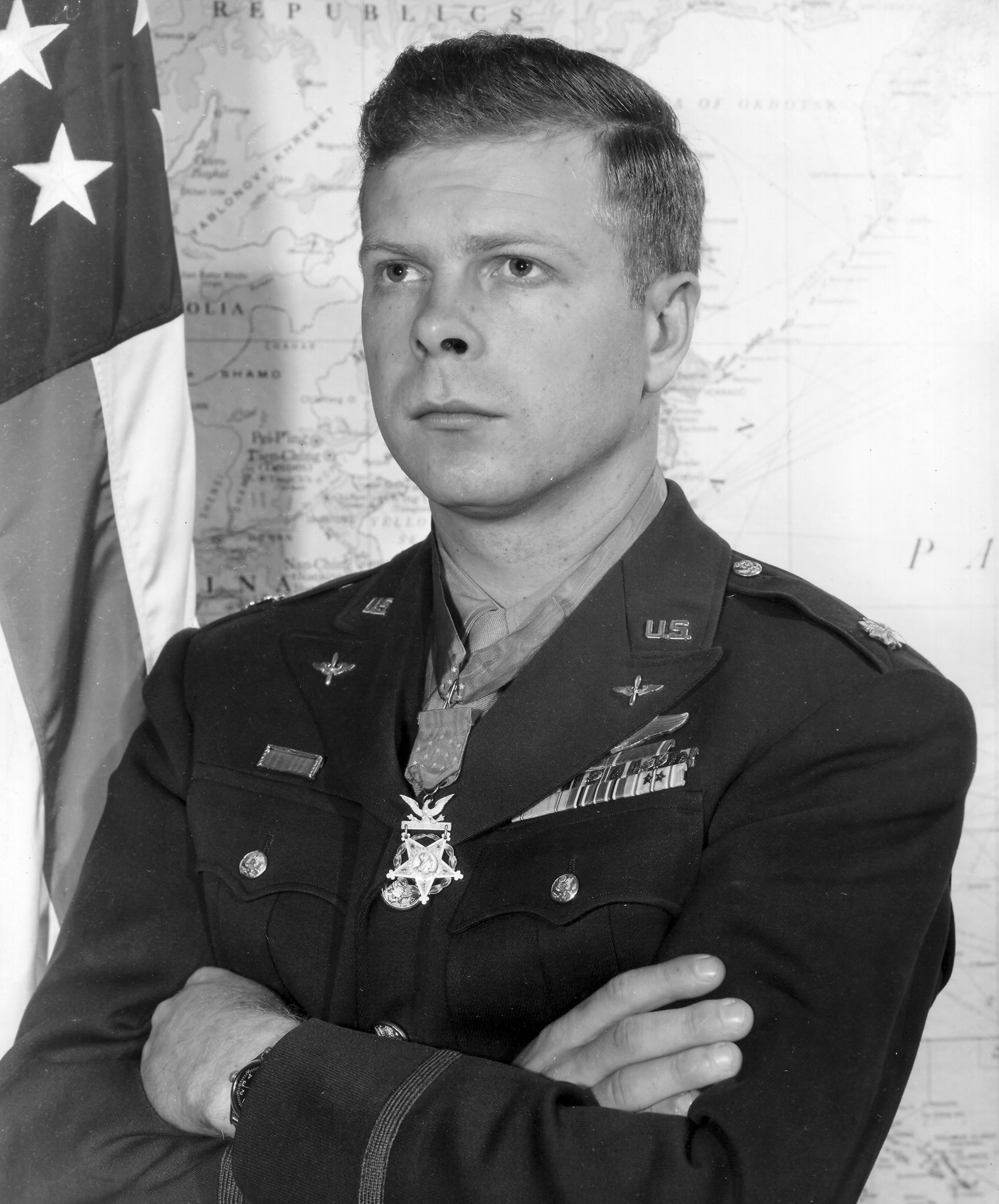
- Major Bong c. 1945
- Born: Richard Ira Bong; September 24, 1920; Superior, Wisconsin, U.S.
- Died: August 6, 1945 (aged 24); North Hollywood, California, U.S.
- Burial place: Poplar, Wisconsin, U.S.
- Military career
- Allegiance: United States
- Branch: United States Army Air Forces
- Service years: 1941–1945
- Rank: Major
- Nickname: "Dick" Bong
- Unit: 49th Fighter Group
- Conflicts: World War II: South West Pacific Theatre; Battle of Buna-Gona; Philippines campaign (1944–45)
- Awards: Medal of Honor; Distinguished Service Cross; Silver Star (2); Distinguished Flying Cross (7); Air Medal (15)

Richard Ira "Dick" Bong (September 24, 1920 – August 6, 1945) was a United States Army Air Forces officer and Medal of Honor recipient in World War II. He was one of the most decorated American fighter pilots and the country's top flying ace in the war, credited with shooting down 40 Japanese aircraft, all with the Lockheed P-38 Lightning. He died in California while testing a Lockheed P-80 jet fighter shortly before the war ended. Bong was posthumously inducted into the National Aviation Hall of Fame in 1986 and has several commemorative monuments named in his honor around the world, including an airport, two bridges, a theater, a veterans historical center, a recreation area, a neighborhood terrace, and several avenues and streets, including the street leading to the National Museum of the United States Air Force in Dayton, Ohio.

== Early life ==
Bong was born September 24, 1920, in Superior, Wisconsin, the first of nine children born to Carl Bong, an immigrant from Sweden, and Dora Bryce, who was an American of Scottish-English descent. Known by the common nickname "Dick", he grew up on a farm in Poplar, Wisconsin, where he became interested in aircraft at an early age while watching planes fly over the farm carrying mail for President Calvin Coolidge's Summer White House in Superior, and was an avid model builder.

Bong entered Poplar High School in 1934, where he played the clarinet in the marching band and participated in baseball, basketball, and hockey. Because Poplar was a three-year school at the time, Bong transferred to Central High School in Superior for his senior year, graduating in 1938.

He began studying at Superior State Teachers College (the current-day University of Wisconsin–Superior) in 1938. While there, Bong enrolled in the Civilian Pilot Training Program and also took private flying lessons. On May 29, 1941, he enlisted in the Army Air Corps Aviation Cadet Program. One of his flight instructors was Captain Barry Goldwater, who later served as a U.S. Senator from Arizona and was the Republican nominee for president in 1964.

== United States Army Air Forces ==
Bong's ability as a fighter pilot was recognized while he was training in northern California. He was commissioned a second lieutenant and awarded his pilot wings on January 19, 1942. His first assignment was as an instructor (gunnery) pilot at Luke Field, Arizona, from January to May 1942. His first operational assignment was on May 6 to the 49th Fighter Squadron (FS), 14th Fighter Group at Hamilton Field, California, where he learned to fly the twin-engine Lockheed P-38 Lightning.

On June 12, 1942, Bong flew very low ("buzzed") over a house in nearby San Anselmo, the home of a pilot who had just been married. He was cited and temporarily grounded for breaking flying rules, along with three other P-38 pilots who had looped around the Golden Gate Bridge on the same day. For looping the Golden Gate Bridge, flying at a low level down Market Street in San Francisco, and blowing the clothes from an Oakland woman's clothesline, Bong was reprimanded by General George C. Kenney, commanding officer of the Fourth Air Force, who told him, "If you didn't want to fly down Market Street, I wouldn't have you in my Air Force, but you are not to do it any more and I mean what I say." Kenney later wrote, "We needed kids like this lad." He also was made to do over that woman's laundry or any other chore.

In all subsequent accounts, Bong denied flying under the Golden Gate Bridge. Nevertheless, Bong was still grounded when the rest of his group was sent without him to England in July 1942. Bong then transferred to another Hamilton Field unit, 84th Fighter Squadron of the 78th Fighter Group. From there, Bong was sent to the Southwest Pacific Area.

Bong was then flown overseas as a passenger aboard a B-24 Liberator from Hawaii via Hickam Field to Australia. Upon arrival Bong was assigned to a newly formed P-38 fighter unit, the 17th Fighter Squadron (Provisional). By November 1942, Bong was transferred to the 49th Fighter Group (49th FG), 9th Fighter Squadron (9th FS).

"The Flying Knights" were flying the P-40 Warhawk, and were famous for their aerial defense of Darwin from March 1942 to August 1942. Afterward, the 9th Fighter Squadron was one of two units in the 5th Air Force selected for conversion to the P-38 Lightning. Bong was among a group of new pilots in the South-West Pacific Area (SWPA) with experience flying the new twin-engine fighter, and they helped these pilots convert from the P-40 Warhawk and P-39 Aircobra to the P-38 Lightning.

In November, while the squadron waited for delivery of the scarce P-38s, Bong and other 9th FS pilots were reassigned temporarily to fly missions and gain combat experience with the 39th Fighter Squadron, 35th Fighter Group, based in Port Moresby, New Guinea. On December 27, Bong claimed his initial aerial victory, shooting down a Mitsubishi A6M "Zero", and a Nakajima Ki-43 "Oscar" over Buna (during the Battle of Buna-Gona). For this action, Bong was awarded the Silver Star.

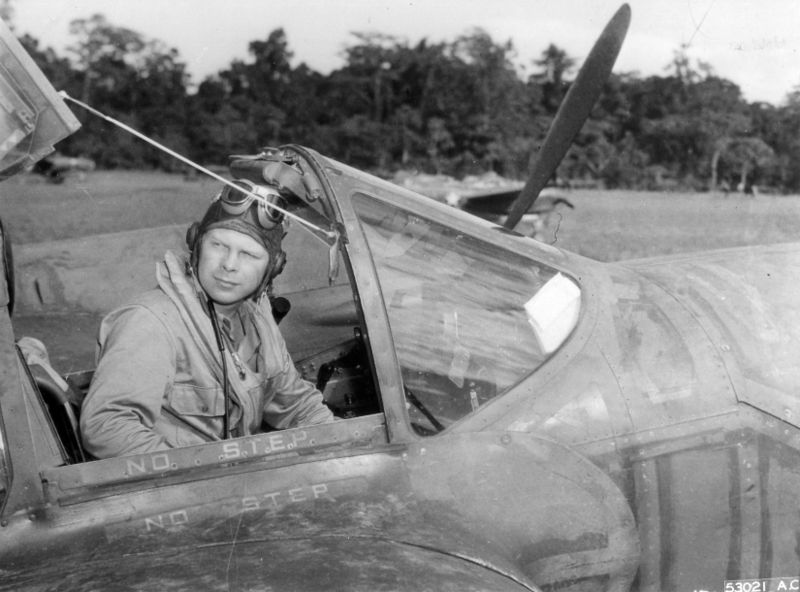
Major Bong in his P-38

Bong rejoined the 9th FS, by then equipped with P-38s, in January 1943; the 49th FG was based at Schwimmer Field near Port Moresby. In April, he was promoted to first lieutenant. On July 26, Bong claimed four Japanese fighters over Lae, in an action that earned him the Distinguished Service Cross. In August, he was promoted to captain.

While on leave to the United States the following November and December, Bong met Marjorie Vattendahl at a Superior State Teachers College homecoming event and began dating her.

After returning to the southwest Pacific in January 1944, he named his P-38 Marge and adorned the nose with her photo. In March another pilot was flying Bong's aircraft when it suffered engine failure and crashed in New Guinea, after the pilot, who survived, had bailed out. The approximate crash site is known, and the remains of the aircraft were to be searched for by the Richard I Bong Veterans Historical Center in Superior, Wisconsin and the WWII historical preservation group Pacific Wrecks in 2024. On May 24 of that year, the groups released a statement in which they announced that the crash site had been found with wreckage bearing the serial number of Bong's aircraft.

On April 12, Captain Bong shot down his 26th and 27th Japanese aircraft, surpassing Eddie Rickenbacker's American record of 26 credited victories in World War I. Soon afterward, he was promoted to major by General Kenney and dispatched to the United States to see General "Hap" Arnold, who gave him a leave. After visiting training bases and going on a 15-state bond promotion tour, Bong returned to New Guinea in September. He was assigned to the V Fighter Command staff as an advanced gunnery instructor, with permission to go on missions but not to seek combat. Bong continued flying from Tacloban, Leyte, during the Philippines campaign; by December 17, he had increased his air-to-air victory claims to 40.

Bong considered his gunnery accuracy to be poor, so he compensated by getting as close to his targets as possible to make sure he hit them. In some cases he flew through the debris of exploding enemy aircraft, and on one occasion collided with his target, which he claimed as a "probable" victory.

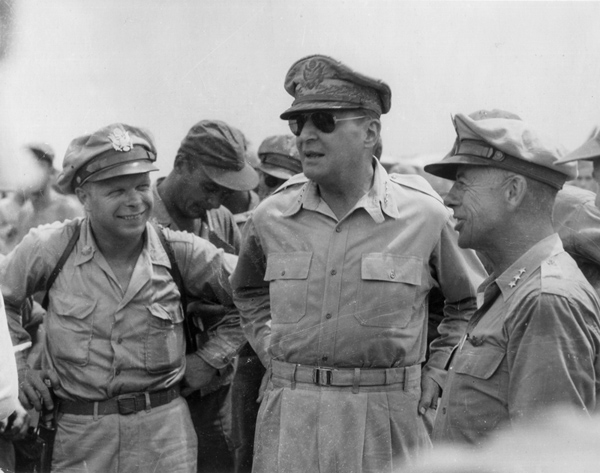
Major Bong with General Douglas MacArthur and General Kenney on December 12, 1944

On the recommendation of General Kenney, the Far East Air Force commander, Bong received the Medal of Honor from General Douglas MacArthur in a special ceremony in December 1944. Bong's Medal of Honor citation says that he flew combat missions despite his status as an instructor, which was one of his duties as standardization officer for V Fighter Command. His rank of major qualified him for a squadron command, but he always flew as a flight (four-plane) or element (two-plane) leader.

In January 1945, Kenney sent Bong, America's ace of aces home for good. Bong married Vattendahl on February 10, 1945. He participated in numerous public relations activities, such as promoting the sale of war bonds.

== Death ==
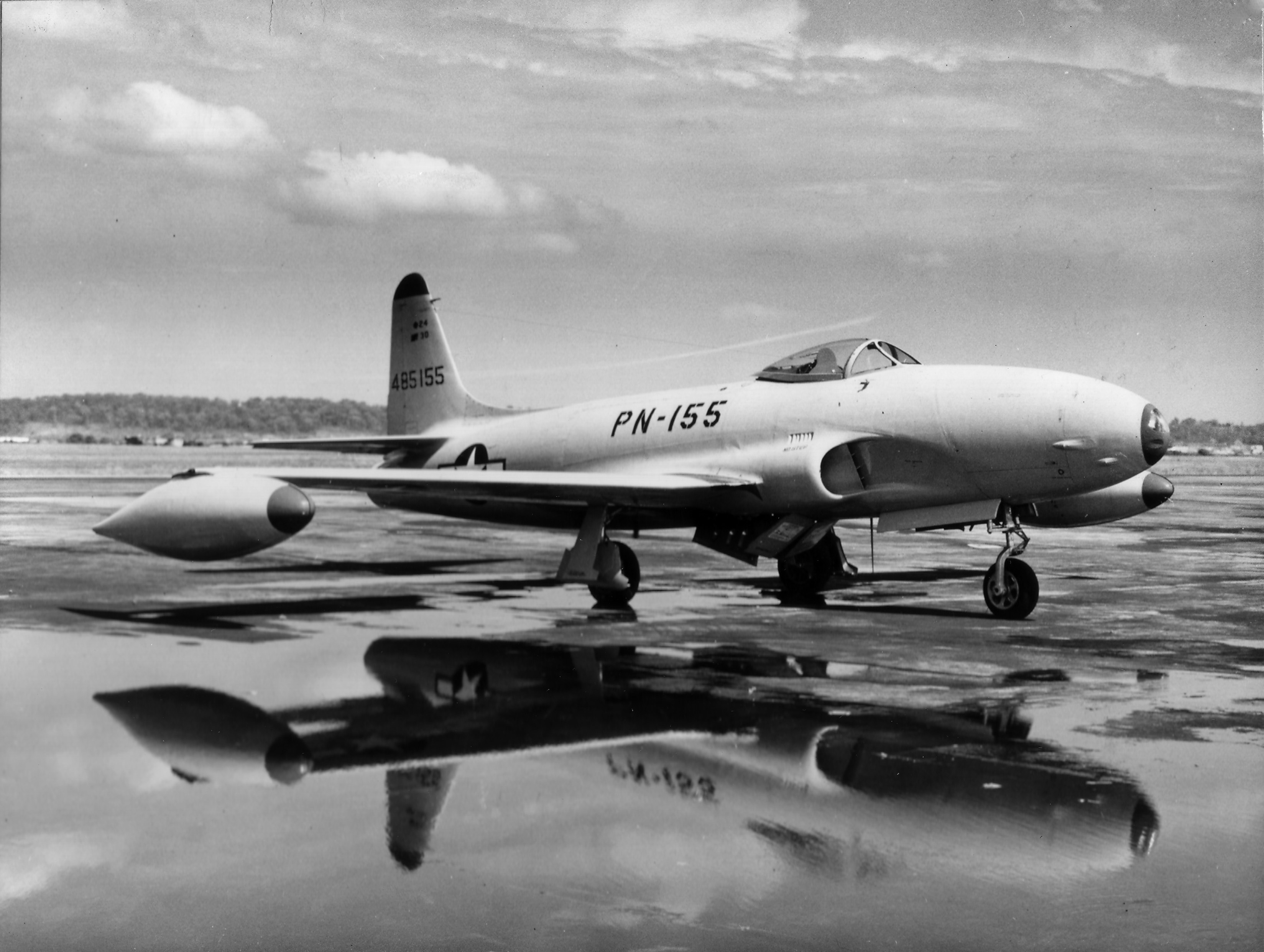
Bong was killed in 1945 while testing a P-80A similar to this one.

Bong then became a test pilot assigned to Lockheed's plant in Burbank, California, where he flew P-80 Shooting Star jet fighters at the Lockheed Air Terminal. On August 6, 1945, he took off to perform the acceptance flight of P-80A 44-85048. It was his 12th flight in the P-80; he had a total of four hours and fifteen minutes of flight time in the jet.

The plane's primary fuel pump malfunctioned during takeoff. Bong did not switch to the auxiliary fuel pump, either forgetting or unable to do so. He ejected, but an eyewitness account says the aircraft exploded immediately afterward, before he could achieve a safe separation distance. He was also too low for his parachute to open. The plane crashed into a narrow field at Oxnard Street and Satsuma Avenue, North Hollywood. His death was front-page news across the country, sharing space with the first news of the bombing of Hiroshima.

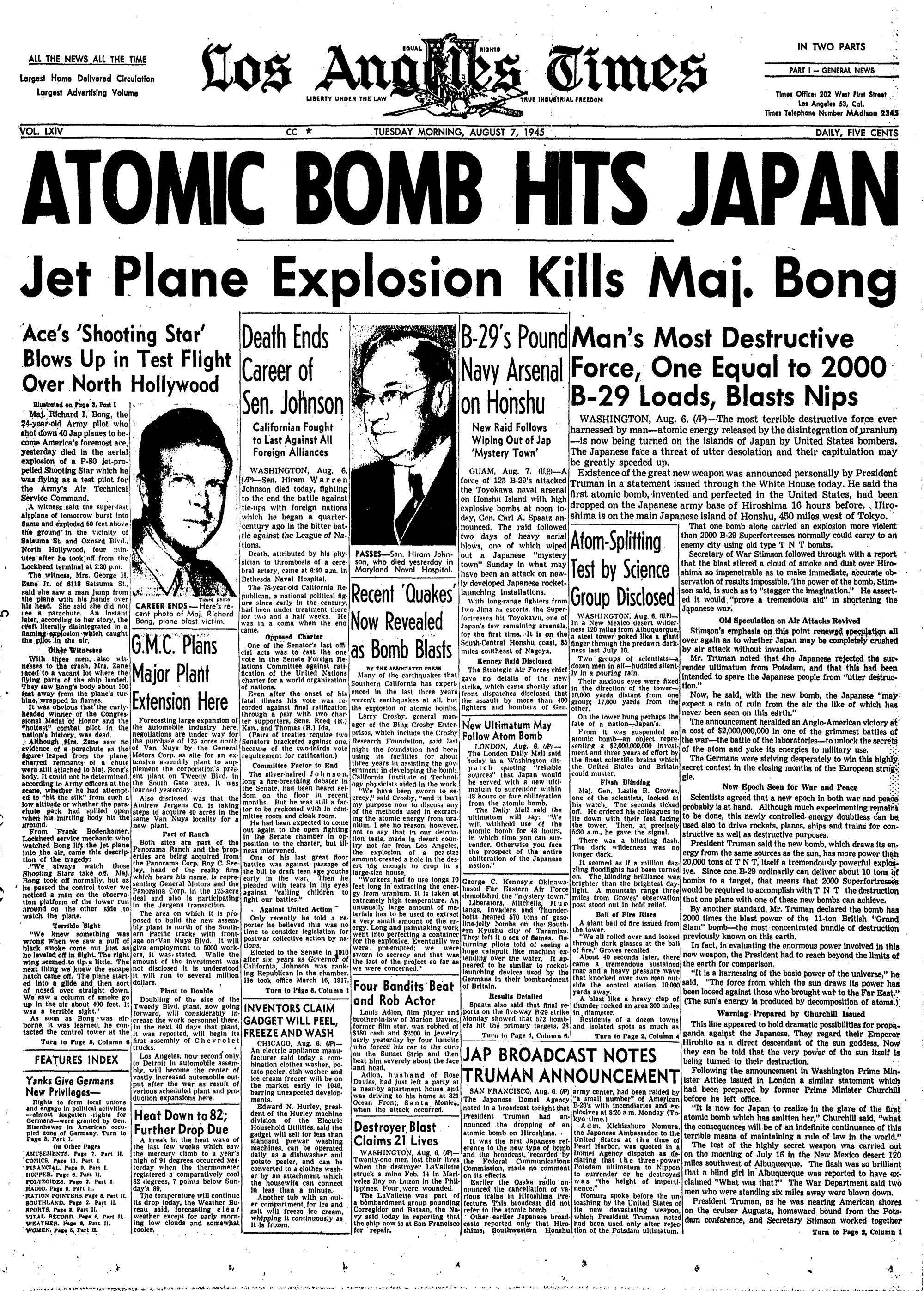
His death was featured prominently in national newspapers, even though it occurred on the same day as the atomic bombing of Hiroshima.

The I-16 auxiliary fuel pump had been added to P-80s after an earlier fatal crash. Captain Ray Crawford, a fellow P-80 test/acceptance flight pilot who flew on August 6, later said Bong had told him that he had forgotten to turn on the I-16 pump on an earlier flight.

In his autobiography, Chuck Yeager writes that part of the culture of test flying at the time, due to its fearsome mortality rates, was anger toward pilots who died in test flights, to avoid being overcome by sorrow for lost comrades. Bong's brother Carl, who wrote his biography, questions whether Bong repeated the mistake so soon after mentioning it to another pilot. Carl's book – Dear Mom, So We Have a War (1991) – contains numerous reports and findings from the crash investigations.

== Legacy ==
In the mid-1950s, construction on a new USAF installation commenced south of Milwaukee that was to be named Richard I. Bong Air Force Base. The base, intended to be an Air Defense Command fighter base for the Chicago and Milwaukee areas, was conceived in the early 1950s with construction commencing in the mid-1950s. Construction had barely begun when the base was transferred to the Strategic Air Command as a prospective base for the supersonic B-58 Hustler bomber. Prior to completion, the base was considered obsolete as it had become apparent to USAF officials that the base would be redundant with installations nearby that would soon have space for more units. The base was abandoned in 1959 and disposed of the following year. Today, the former base site is known as the Richard Bong State Recreation Area.

It was planned that Spokane Air Force Base, Washington, was to be renamed Bong Air Force Base, until General Muir Fairchild died on active duty in 1950, and it was named Fairchild Air Force Base instead.

Bong is buried at Poplar Cemetery in Poplar, Wisconsin.

Bong Terrace in Mount Holly, New Jersey, is named in his honor.

The Richard I. Bong Memorial Bridge carrying U.S. Highway 2 between Duluth, Minnesota and Superior, Wisconsin honors him.

There remains a Bong Ave. on what was once the Richards-Gebaur Air Force Base in Belton, Missouri.

Bong was selected as the United States Air Force Academy Class of 2003 Exemplar.

== Aerial victory credits ==
Chronicle of aerial victories
Date	#	Location/Comment	Aircraft flown
December 27, 1942	2	over Buna, 1 Val Dive Bomber & 1 Zero	P-38F Lightning, Lockheed
January 7, 1943	2	Nakajima Ki-43 "Oscars" over Lae	P-38F
January 8, 1943	1	over Lae Harbor, ace status	P-38F
March 3, 1943	1	Mitsubishi A6M "Zero" during Battle of the Bismarck Sea	P-38G-5
March 11, 1943	2	"Zeroes"	P-38G-5
March 29, 1943	1	Reconnaissance plane, Dinah Ki 46; promoted to 1st Lieutenant. Over Bismarck Sea	P-38G-5
April 14, 1943	1	bomber, Betty G4M, over Milne Bay. Awarded Air Medal.	P-38G-5
June 12, 1943	1	"Oscar" Ki-43, over Bena Bena	P-38G-5
July 26, 1943	4	fighters, on escort over Lae; awarded DSC	P-38G-5
July 28, 1943	1	"Oscar", on escort over New Britain.	P-38G-5
September 6, 1943	0	claimed two bombers, not confirmed; crash-landed at Mailinan airstrip	P-38(?)
October 2, 1943	1	Mitsubishi Ki-46 "Dinah", over Gasmata	P-38H
October 29, 1943	2	"Zeros", over Japanese airfield at Rabaul	P-38H
November 5, 1943	2	"Zeros", over enemy airfield at Rabaul	P-38H
December 1943 – January 1944: On leave in Wisconsin
February 1944: assigned to Fifth Air Force Fighter Command HQ, but allowed to "free-lance".
February 15, 1944	1	Kawasaki Ki-61 "Tony" off Cape Hoskins, New Britain	P-38(?)
February 28, 1944	0	destroyed a Japanese transport plane on the runway at Wewak, New Guinea	P-38(?)
March 3, 1944	2	Mitsubishi Ki-21 "Sally" bombers, over Tadji, New Guinea	P-38(?)
April 3, 1944	1	fighter over Hollandia, 25th credit	P-38(?)
April 12, 1944	3	surpassed Eddie Rickenbacker's U.S. record of 26 kills	P-38(?)
May–July 1944: on leave in U.S., made publicity tours
October 10, 1944	2	Nakajima J1N "Irving" and "Oscar"	P-38L-1
October 27, 1944	1	"Oscar"	P-38J
October 28, 1944	2	"Oscars" off Leyte	P-38L-1
November 10, 1944	1	"Oscar" over Ormoc Bay	P-38L-1
November 11, 1944	2	Recommended for Medal of Honor.	P-38L-1
December 7, 1944	2	"Sally" and Nakajima Ki-44 "Tojo", covering U.S. landings at Ormoc	P-38L-1
December 15, 1944	1	"Oscar"	P-38L-1
December 17, 1944	1	"Oscar" over Mindoro.	P-38L-1

== Military awards ==
Bong's military decorations and awards include:

United States Army Air Forces pilot badge
Medal of Honor		Distinguished Service Cross
Silver Star w/ one Bronze Oak Leaf Cluster	Distinguished Flying Cross w/ one Silver Oak Leaf Cluster and one Bronze Oak Leaf Cluster	Air Medal w/ two Silver Oak Leaf Clusters and two Bronze Oak Leaf Clusters
Air Medal w/ one Bronze Oak Leaf Cluster	American Defense Service Medal	American Campaign Medal
Asiatic-Pacific Campaign Medal w/ one 3/16" silver star	World War II Victory Medal	Philippine Liberation Medal w/ one 3/16" bronze star

Army Presidential Unit Citation w/ one bronze oak leaf cluster	Philippine Presidential Unit Citation

=== Medal of Honor citation ===
Medal of Honor

Rank and organization: Major, United States Army Air Forces
Place and date: Over Borneo and Leyte, October 10 to November 15, 1944
Entered service at: Poplar, Wisconsin
Birth: Poplar, Wisconsin
G.O. No.: 90, December 8, 1944

For conspicuous gallantry and intrepidity in action above and beyond the call of duty in the Southwest Pacific area from October 10, to November 15, 1944. Though assigned to duty as gunnery instructor and neither required nor expected to perform combat duty, Maj. Bong voluntarily and at his own urgent request engaged in repeated combat missions, including unusually hazardous sorties over Balikpapan, Borneo, and in the Leyte area of the Philippines. His aggressiveness and daring resulted in his shooting down 8 enemy airplanes during this period.

== Commemoration ==
- Richard Bong State Recreation Area on the site of what was to be Bong Air Force Base in Kenosha County, Wisconsin
- Richard I. Bong Memorial Bridge along US Highway 2 in the Twin Ports of Duluth, Minnesota, and Superior, Wisconsin
- Richard I. Bong Airport in Superior, Wisconsin
- Bong Barracks of the Aviation Challenge program
- Major Richard I. Bong Bridge on Macarthur Drive, Annandale, Townsville, Australia (19.3125°S 146.7862°E)
- Major Richard Ira Bong Squadron of the Arnold Air Society at the University of Wisconsin
- Richard Bong Theatre in Misawa, Japan, and the 613th Air and Space Operations Center, Thirteenth Air Force, Hickam Air Force Base, Hawaii.
- Bong Avenues on the former site of the decommissioned Richards-Gebaur Air Force Base, on Lackland AFB in San Antonio, Texas, on Luke AFB in Glendale, Arizona, on Elmendorf AFB in Anchorage, Alaska, Fairchild AFB in Spokane, Washington, and on Kadena AFB in Okinawa, Japan. Bong Blvd on Barksdale AFB in Bossier City, Louisiana.
- Bong Terrace, Mount Holly Township, New Jersey (Mount View neighborhood, built 1956–1957).
- Bong Street, Dayton, Ohio, leading to the National Museum of the United States Air Force, and on Holloman AFB near Alamogordo, New Mexico.
- National Aviation Hall of Fame (1986)
- Wisconsin Aviation Hall of Fame (1987).
- Bong was named as the class exemplar at the United States Air Force Academy for the Class of 2003.
- International Air and Space Hall of Fame (2018)

=== Richard I. Bong Veterans Historical Center ===
The Richard I. Bong Veterans Historical Center in Superior, Wisconsin, is housed in a structure intended to resemble an aircraft hangar, and contains a museum, a film screening room, and a P-38 Lightning restored to resemble Bong's plane.

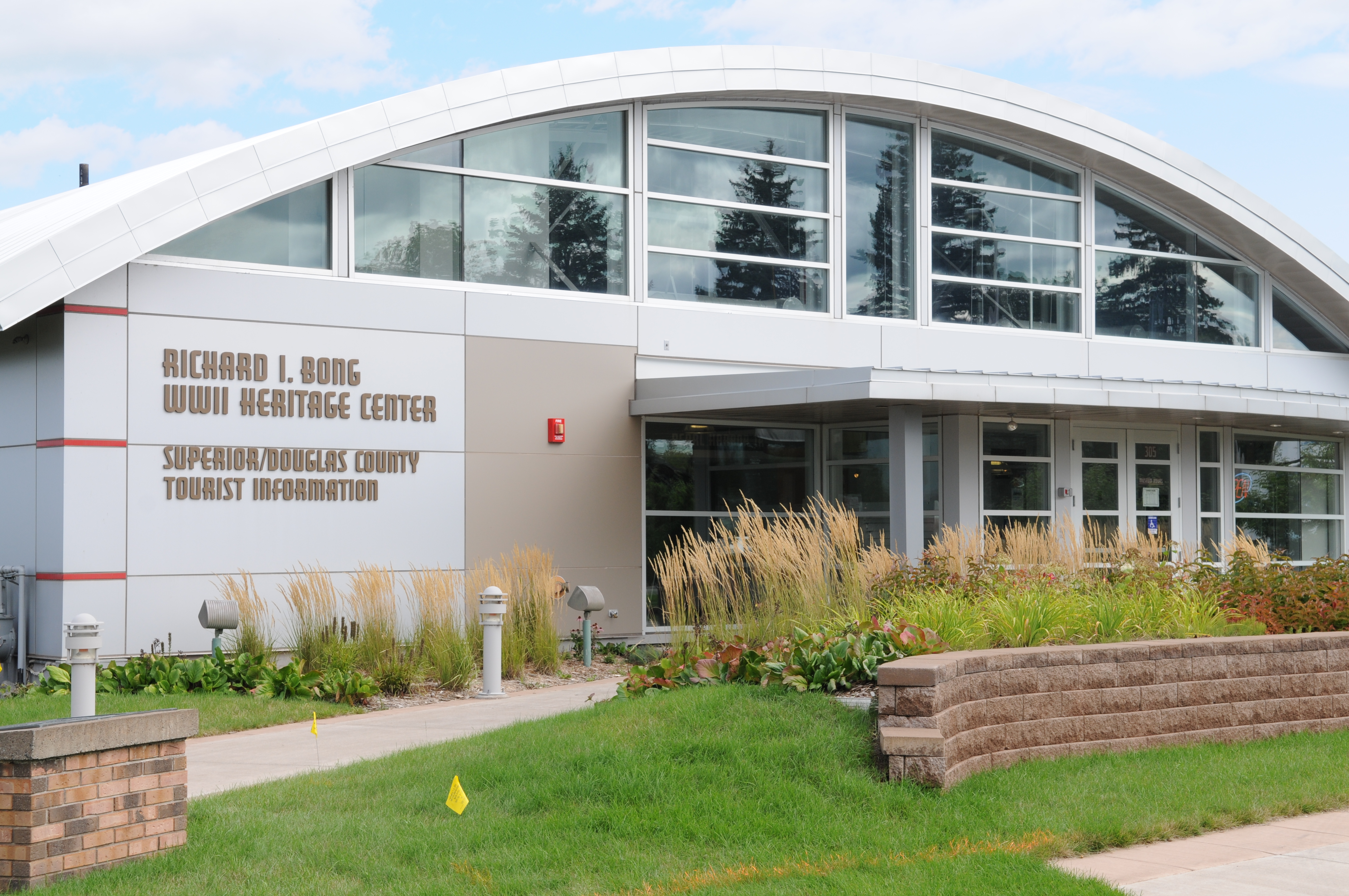
Richard Bong Veterans Historical Center

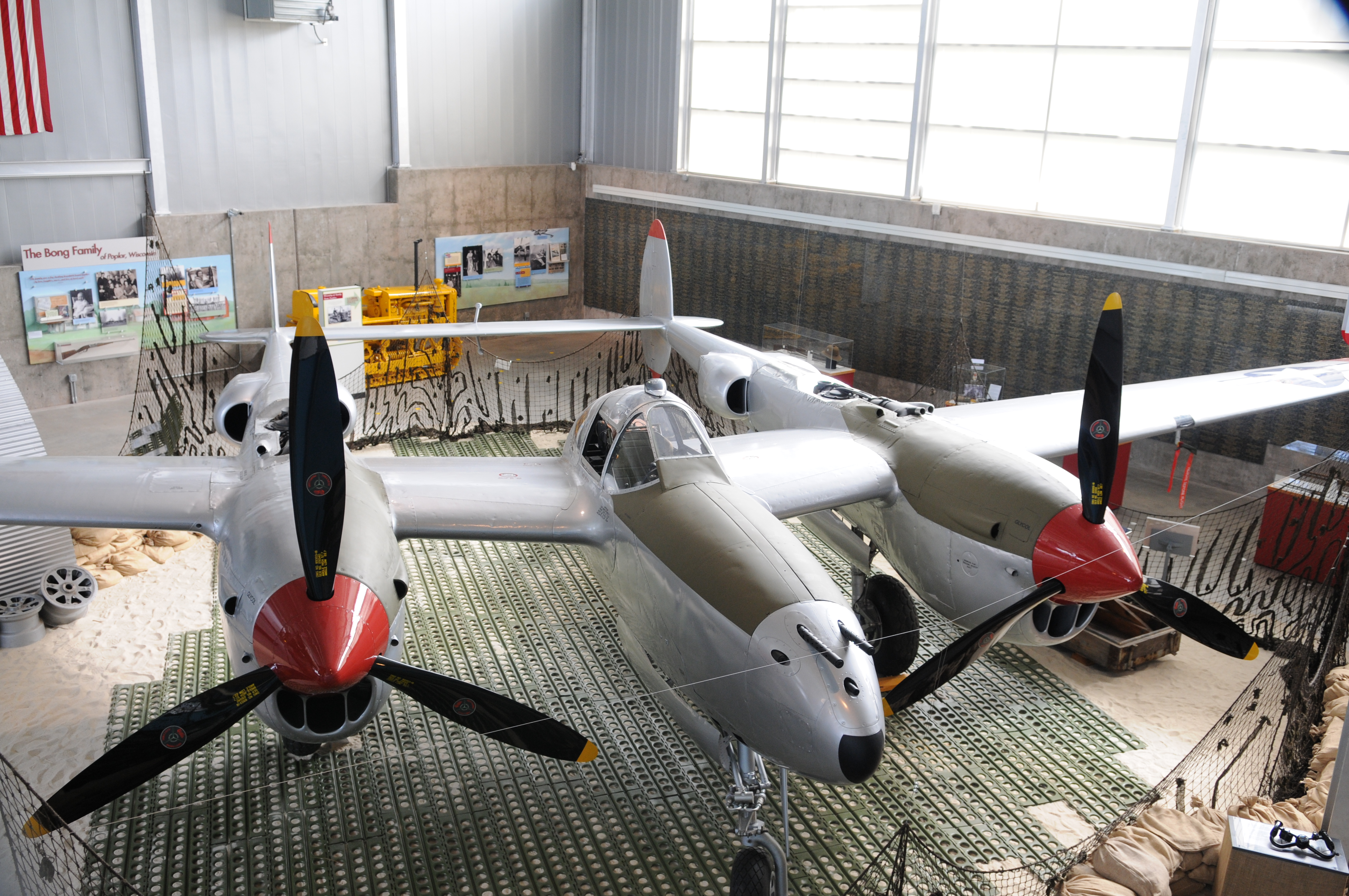
Replica of Bong's P-38 Lightning

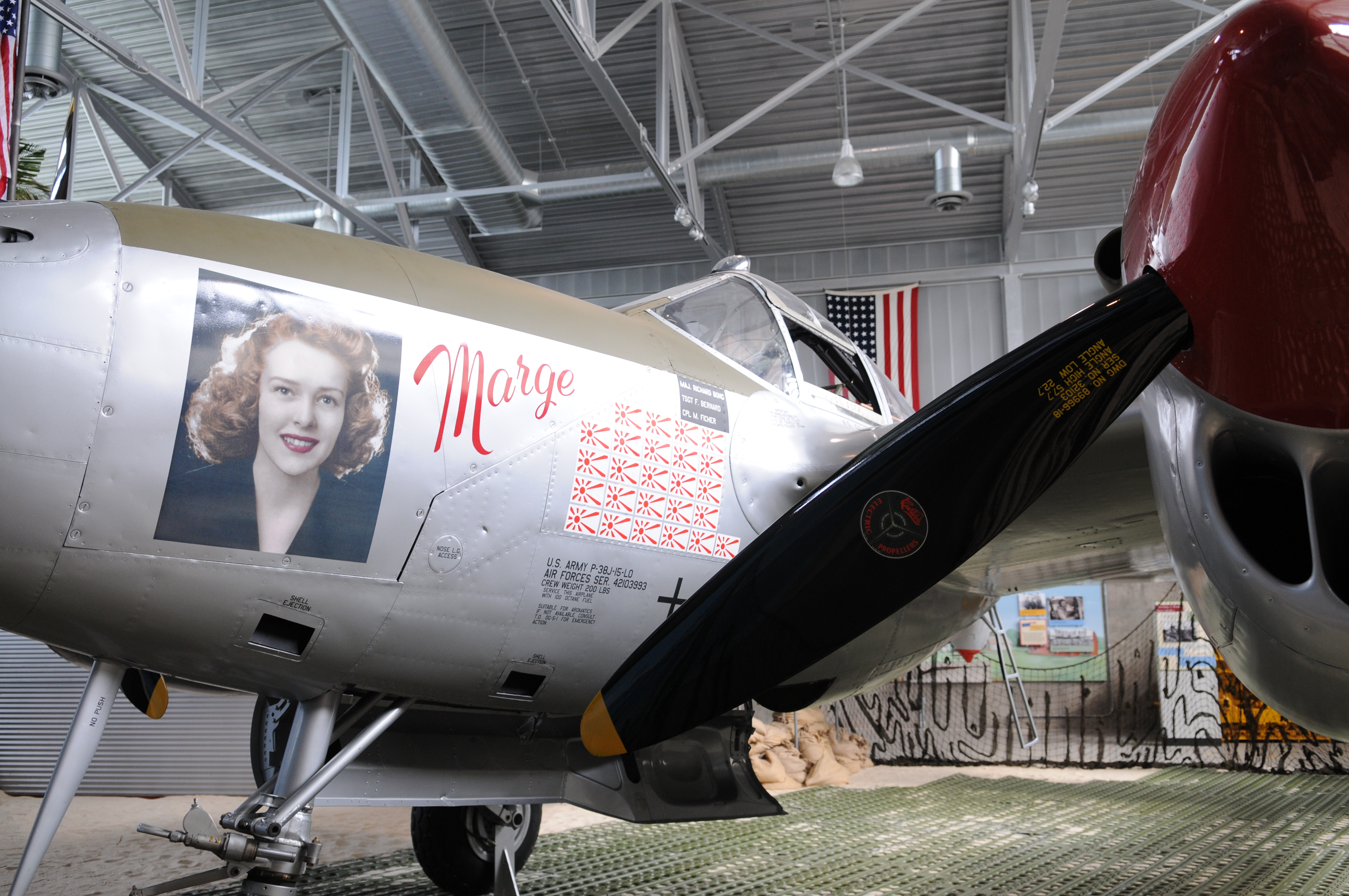
Bong's victory marking on P-38

== See also ==
- List of Medal of Honor recipients for World War II
- Thomas McGuire, American combat pilot with the second-most enemy planes shot down, World War II
