= Northwestern High School (Wisconsin) =

Coordinates: 46°35′31.0″N 91°43′19.2″W

Location
- 4751 County Highway F Maple, Douglas County, 54854, Wisconsin; United States

Information
- Funding type: Public
- Principal: Brian Smith
- Teaching staff: 24.94 (FTE)
- Grades: 9 through 12
- Enrollment: 393 (2023-2024)
- Student to teacher ratio: 15.76
- Colors: Black and gold
- Song: Northwestern Fight Song
- Mascot: Tiger
- Website: Northwestern High School

Northwestern High School is a public high school in Maple, Douglas County, Wisconsin. It is part of Maple School District. The district serves the villages of Poplar and Lake Nebagamon; the unincorporated communities of Maple, Brule, and Iron River; and the counties of Douglas and Bayfield.

== Athletics ==
Northwestern's mascot is the Tiger, and they have been members of the Heart O'North Conference since 1974.

=== Athletic conference affiliation history ===
- Michigan-Wisconsin Conference (1960-1973)
- Heart O'North Conference (1974-present)
