= Maples Inn =

Maples Inn may refer to:

- Maples Inn (Pointe-Claire, Quebec), home of the first miniature golf course in Canada
- The Maples Inn, also known as Hampton Inn (New Canaan, Connecticut)
- Maples Inn, onetime name of N. S. Williams House, East Taunton, Massachusetts
