= Michael Anthony Crisfield =

English mathematician

- Born: 26 July 1942; Wimbledon, London, England
- Died: 19 February 2002 (aged 59)
- Education: Queen's University, Belfast
- Known for: Finite element method Nonlinear system
- Scientific career
- Fields: Computational mechanics Finite element method
- Workplaces: Imperial College London

Michael Anthony Crisfield (26 July 1942 – 19 February 2002) was a British mathematician and structural analyst who became a leading figure in non-linear computational mechanics. He died of cancer aged 59 in 2002.

== Books ==
- Crisfield, M. A., Finite Elements and Solution Procedures for Structural Analysis, Volume 1: Linear Analysis, Pineridge Press 1986.
- Crisfield, M. A., Non-Linear Finite Element Analysis of Solids and Structures, Volume 1: Essentials, John Wiley & Sons 1991.
- Crisfield, M. A., Non-Linear Finite Element Analysis of Solids and Structures, Volume 2: Advanced Topics, John Wiley & Sons 1997.
