= Maple, Dallas =

Coordinates: 32.8722°N 97.2797°W

Maple Lawn, or Maple for short is an area in Dallas, Texas, United States, which is home to government owned section 8 projects. The area has long been home to a largely African American and Hispanic community. Maple Avenue is the main road through the area, although the Maple Lawn area is unofficially the area bound to the West/Southwest of Harry Hines Boulevard, to the East by the Dallas North Tollway, to the North/Northeast by Lemmon Avenue, and to the Northwest by Mockingbird Lane.
