= Henry Crisfield =

Australian rules footballer

Personal information
- Full name: Henry Francis Crisfield
- Born: 13 September 1877; Chiltern, Victoria
- Died: 5 February 1945 (aged 67); Moonee Ponds, Victoria
- Original team: Rutherglen
- Height: 178 cm (5 ft 10 in)
- Weight: 80 kg (176 lb)

Playing career^{1}
Years	Club	Games (Goals)
1902	Carlton	5 (3)
- ^{1} Playing statistics correct to the end of 1902.

Henry Francis Crisfield (13 September 1877 – 5 February 1945) was an Australian rules footballer who played with Carlton in the Victorian Football League (VFL).
