= Sydney Crosfield =

English cricketer

Personal information
- Full name: Sydney Morland Crosfield
- Born: 12 November 1861; Warrington, Lancashire, England
- Died: 30 January 1908 (aged 46); Las Palmas, Canary Islands
- Batting: Right-handed
- Bowling: Right-arm slow

Domestic team information
- Years: Team
- 1883 to 1899: Lancashire

Career statistics
Competition	First-class
Matches	96
Runs scored	2027
Batting average	14.90
100s/50s	0/7
Top score	82 not out
Balls bowled	339
Wickets	3
Bowling average	50.33
5 wickets in innings	0
10 wickets in match	0
Best bowling	1/1
Catches/stumpings	49/–
- Source: Cricinfo, 9 November 2020

Sydney Morland Crosfield (12 November 1861 – 30 January 1908) was an English cricketer who played first-class cricket for Lancashire from 1883 to 1899 and was club captain in 1892 and 1893. He also played non-first-class cricket for Cheshire from 1881 to 1887.

Crosfield was educated at Wimbledon College in Surrey. His highest first-class score was 82 not out, which he scored twice: against Yorkshire in 1891, when he was the highest scorer in the match, which Lancashire won, and against Nottinghamshire in 1892, when he was again the match's top scorer, though this time Nottinghamshire won.

He was also a champion shot with the gun, winning the Grand Prix de Casino at Monte Carlo two years in succession.
