= Maple Township =

Maple Township may refer to one of the following places in the United States:

- Maple Township, Ida County, Iowa
- Maple Township, Cowley County, Kansas
- Maple Township, Cass County, Minnesota
- Maple Township, Dodge County, Nebraska
