= Maples (Middletown, Delaware) =

Historic house in Delaware, US

- U.S. National Register of Historic Places
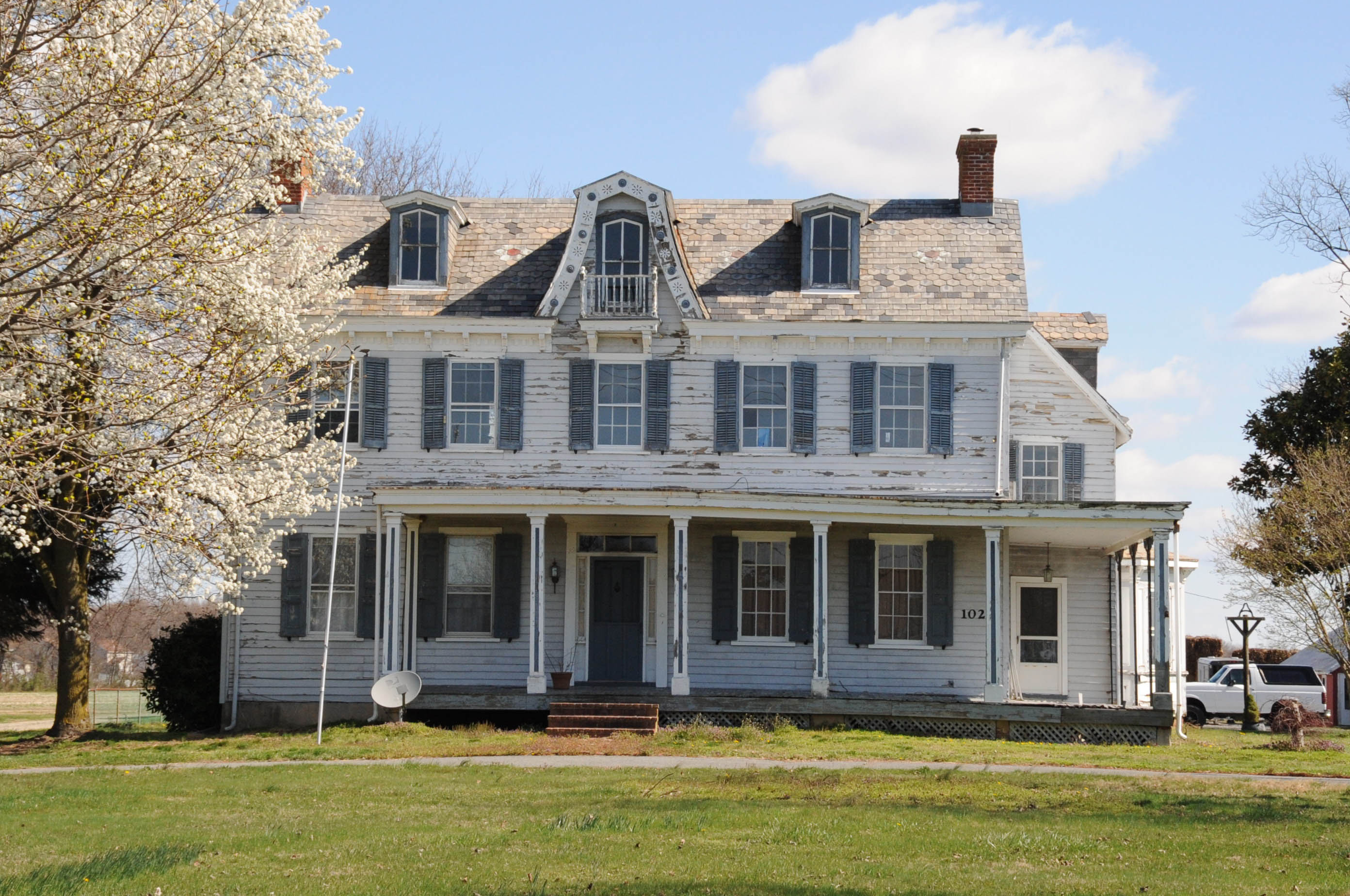

- Location within Delaware Location within the United States
- Location: 1023 Bunker Hill Road in St. Georges Hundred, Middletown, Delaware
- Coordinates: 39.454936°N 75.737883°W
- Area: 2 acres (0.81 ha)
- Built: c. 1855
- Architectural style: Greek Revival, Beaux Arts, Delaware Vernacular
- NRHP reference No.: 78000895
- Added to NRHP: February 17, 1978

Maples is a historic building located near Middletown in New Castle County, Delaware, United States. It was built about 1855, and is a two-story, L-shaped, frame dwelling. It is in the Delaware vernacular style with Greek Revival and Second Empire style details. The building has a wraparound porch with flat roof, a cross-gable roof, and interior end chimneys.

It was listed on the National Register of Historic Places in 1978.
