= Maple (community), Wisconsin =

Maple, Wisconsin
- Unincorporated community
- Location within Wisconsin Location within the United States
- Coordinates: 46°35′23″N 91°43′15″W
- Country: United States
- State: Wisconsin
- County: Douglas
- Town: Maple
- Elevation: 1,096 ft (334 m)
- Time zone: UTC-6 (Central (CST))
  - Summer (DST): UTC-5 (CDT)
- ZIP code: 54854
- Area codes: 715 and 534
- GNIS feature ID: 1568957

Maple is an unincorporated community, located in the town of Maple, Douglas County, Wisconsin, United States.

The community is located 22 miles east of the city of Superior.

U.S. Highway 2 serves as a main route in the community.

Maple has a post office with ZIP code 54854.
