= Maple School District =

School district in Wisconsin, United States

Address
- 4751 S County Rd F Maple, Wisconsin, 54854; United States

District information
- Grades: PK–12
- Schools: 4
- NCES District ID: 5508640

Students and staff
- Enrollment: 1.278 (2023–24)
- Faculty: 78.95 (on an FTE basis)
- Student–teacher ratio: 16.19:1

Other information
- Website: www.nw-tigers.org

The Maple School District is a public school district in Douglas County, Wisconsin, United States, based in Maple, Wisconsin.

== Schools ==
The Maple School District has two elementary schools, one middle school, and one high school.

=== Elementary schools ===
- Iron River Elementary School
- Northwestern Elementary School

=== Middle school ===
- Northwestern Middle School

=== High school ===
- Northwestern High School
