= Crosfield Electronics =

Defunct UK electronics company

- Industry: Imaging
- Founded: 1947; 78 years ago in London, England
- Founder: John Crosfield; Dennis Bent
- Defunct: November 1996
- Fate: Acquired by Fujifilm
- Successor: Fujifilm Electronic Imaging

Crosfield Electronics was a British electronics imaging company founded by John Crosfield (1915–2012) and Dennis Bent in 1947 to produce process imaging devices for the print industry. The firm was notable for its innovation in colour drum scanning in its Scanatron (1959) and later Magnascan (1969) products.

The company was acquired by De la Rue in 1974.

The firm was eventually taken over by Fujifilm Japan and named Fujifilm Electronic Imaging, now FFEI Ltd. following a management buy-out in 2008.

== Sources ==
- Crosfield diary notes
