= Ian Crossfield =

Astronomer and exoplanet researcher

Ian J. M. Crossfield
- Education: University of California, Irvine; University of California, Los Angeles
- Known for: Exoplanet atmospheres, K2 exoplanet discoveries, Doppler imaging of brown dwarfs
- Scientific career
- Fields: Astronomy, exoplanetary science
- Workplaces: University of Kansas; Massachusetts Institute of Technology; University of California, Santa Cruz; University of Arizona Lunar and Planetary Laboratory; Max Planck Institute for Astronomy; Jet Propulsion Laboratory

Ian J. M. Crossfield is an astronomer and associate professor of physics and astronomy at the University of Kansas. His research focuses on the discovery and characterization of nearby planetary systems, including studies of exoplanet atmospheres, exoplanet detection, and brown dwarf atmospheres.

Crossfield was lead author of a 2014 Nature paper reporting a two-dimensional cloud map of the nearby brown dwarf Luhman 16B, produced using observations from the Very Large Telescope. He also led a 2016 study of the first five fields observed by the K2 mission, reporting 197 planet candidates and 104 validated exoplanets.

== Education and career ==
Crossfield received a B.S. in physics from the University of California, Irvine in 2004, an M.S. in astronomy from the University of California, Los Angeles in 2009, and a Ph.D. in astronomy from UCLA in 2012. He worked as a systems engineer at NASA's Jet Propulsion Laboratory before completing postdoctoral work at the Max Planck Institute for Astronomy, the University of Arizona's Lunar and Planetary Laboratory, and the University of California, Santa Cruz.

From 2017 to 2020, Crossfield was an assistant professor at the Massachusetts Institute of Technology. He joined the University of Kansas in 2020, where he leads the KU ExoLab, a research group focused on nearby planetary systems.

== Research ==
Crossfield's research concerns the detection and characterization of exoplanets and brown dwarfs using ground- and space-based observations. According to a National Academies biographical profile, his work has included observational programs using the Hubble Space Telescope, Spitzer Space Telescope, W. M. Keck Observatory, and Gemini Observatory, with a focus on testing models of planet formation, atmospheric chemistry, thermal structure, and circulation.

In 2014, Crossfield and collaborators used Doppler imaging to map large-scale bright and dark surface features on Luhman 16B, a brown dwarf in the third-closest stellar system to the Sun. The Nature paper interpreted the map as evidence for patchy clouds and found that the global weather patterns evolved on a timescale of about one day. The European Southern Observatory described the result as the first map of weather on the surface of the nearest brown dwarf to Earth.

Crossfield has also worked on exoplanet discovery and validation with the Kepler/K2 mission. In 2016, he led a study of K2's first five fields that reported 197 planet candidates and 104 validated planets, including planets in the K2-72 system. While at MIT, Crossfield co-led a rapid search of K2 Campaigns 16 and 17 that identified nearly 80 planet candidates shortly after the mission data were released, a process described by MIT News as a dress rehearsal for rapid follow-up of discoveries from the Transiting Exoplanet Survey Satellite.

Crossfield authored the 2015 review article "Observations of Exoplanet Atmospheres" in the Publications of the Astronomical Society of the Pacific, which summarized observational techniques and results in the characterization of exoplanet atmospheres.

== Awards and service ==
NASA selected Crossfield as a 2014 Carl Sagan Fellow for a project titled "Spectroscopy and Cartography of Cool Extrasolar Atmospheres".

Crossfield served on the Astro2020 Panel on Exoplanets, Astrobiology, and the Solar System for the National Academies' decadal survey process. NASA lists him as chair of the Exoplanet Program Analysis Group Executive Committee for 2026.

== Selected publications ==
- Crossfield, Ian J. M. (2015). "Observations of Exoplanet Atmospheres". Publications of the Astronomical Society of the Pacific. 127 (956): 941–960. arXiv:1507.03966. Bibcode:2015PASP..127..941C. doi:10.1086/683115.
- Crossfield, I. J. M.; et al. (January 30, 2014). "A global cloud map of the nearest known brown dwarf". Nature. 505 (7485): 654–656. arXiv:1401.8145. Bibcode:2014Natur.505..654C. doi:10.1038/nature12955. PMID 24476888.
- Crossfield, Ian J. M.; et al. (2016). "197 Candidates and 104 Validated Planets in K2's First Five Fields". The Astrophysical Journal Supplement Series. 226 (1): 7. arXiv:1607.05263. Bibcode:2016ApJS..226....7C. doi:10.3847/0067-0049/226/1/7.
- Crossfield, Ian J. M.; Barman, Travis; Hansen, Brad M. S.; Howard, Andrew W. (2013). "Warm Ice Giant GJ 3470b. I. A Flat Transmission Spectrum Indicates a Hazy, Low-Methane, and/or Metal-Rich Atmosphere". Astronomy & Astrophysics. 559: A33. arXiv:1308.6580. Bibcode:2013A&A...559A..33C. doi:10.1051/0004-6361/201322278.
- Crossfield, Ian J.; Hansen, Brad M. S.; Harrington, Joseph; Cho, James Y-K.; Deming, Drake; Menou, Kristen; Seager, Sara (2010). "A New 24 Micron Phase Curve for Upsilon Andromedae b". The Astrophysical Journal. 723 (2): 1436–1446. arXiv:1008.0393. Bibcode:2010ApJ...723.1436C. doi:10.1088/0004-637X/723/2/1436.
