= Maple (surname) =

Maple is a surname. Notable people with the surname include:

- Dale Maple (1920–2001), US Army private convicted of a crime equivalent to treason in World War II
- Eddie Maple (born 1948), American thoroughbred horse racing jockey
- Howard Maple (1903–1970), National Football League and Major League Baseball player
- Jack Maple (1952–2001), American police officer
- Marvin L. Maple (1936–2016), American accused of kidnaping his grandchildren
- May Maple (1914–2012), electrical engineer, president of the Women's Engineering Society
- Sir John Blundell Maple, 1st Baronet (1845–1903), English businessman, MP for Dulwich
- Sam Maple (1953–2001), American thoroughbred horse racing jockey, brother of Eddie Maple
- Sarah Maple (born 1985), British visual artist
- T. M. Maple (pseudonym of Jim Burke, c. 1956–1994), Canadian comic book letter-writer
- Wiley Maple (born 1990), American alpine skier
- William Maple, 14th-century MP for Southampton
