= Maple Lake (Douglas County, Minnesota) =

Lake in the state of Minnesota, United States

- Location within Minnesota
- Location: Douglas County, Minnesota
- Coordinates: 45°46′38″N 95°22′13″W
- Type: lake

Maple Lake is a lake in Douglas County, in the U.S. state of Minnesota.

Maple Lake was named for the groves of maple near the lake.
