= N. S. Williams House =

Historic house in Massachusetts, United States

- N.S. Williams House
- U.S. National Register of Historic Places
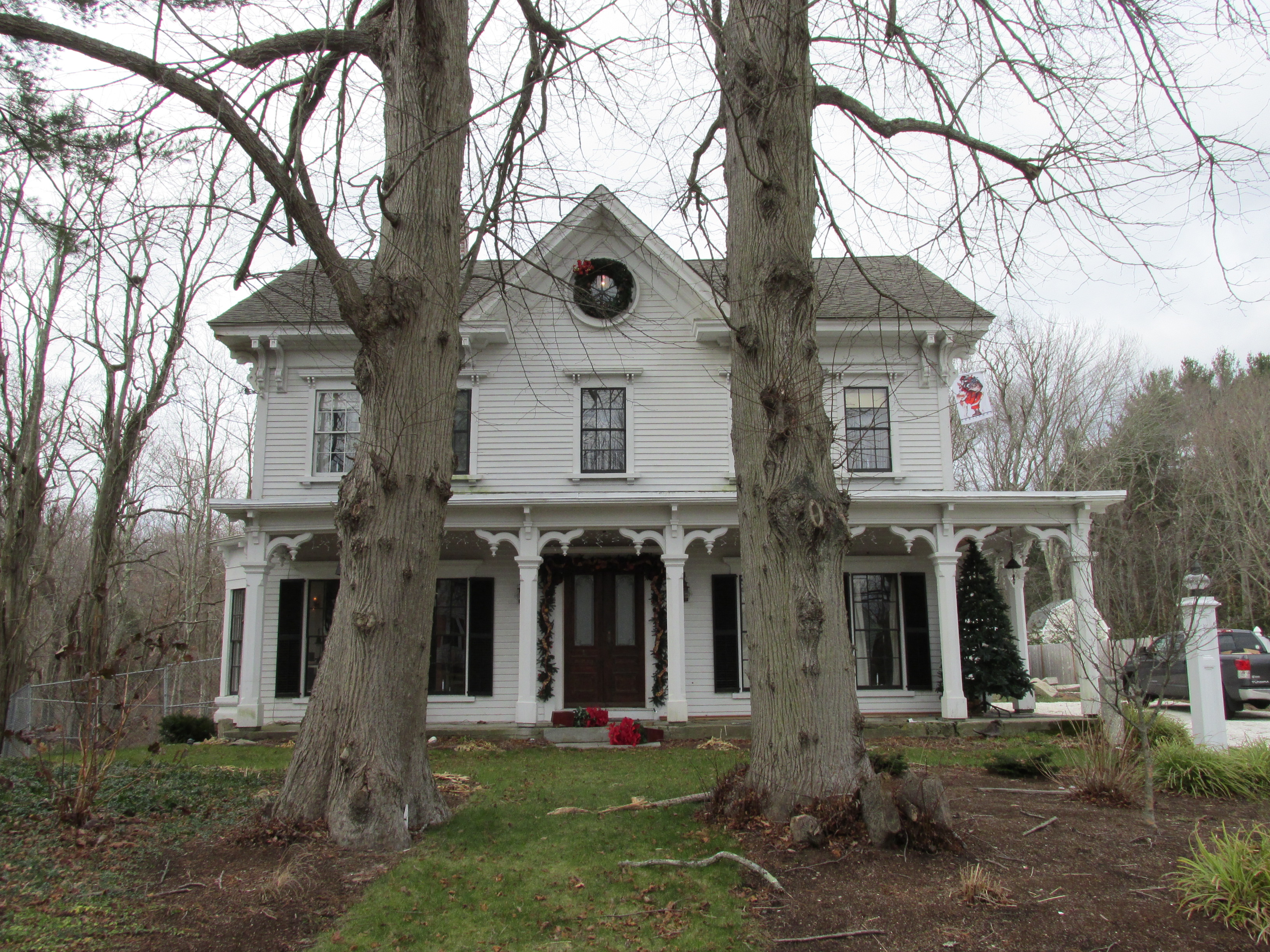
- N. S. Williams House

- Location within Massachusetts Location within the United States
- Location: East Taunton, Massachusetts
- Coordinates: 41°52′55″N 71°0′3″W
- Built: c. 1855
- Architectural style: Italianate
- MPS: Taunton MRA
- NRHP reference No.: 84002285
- Added to NRHP: July 5, 1984

The N.S. Williams House is a historic house located at 1150 Middleboro Avenue in East Taunton part of Taunton, Massachusetts. The 2 1/2-story cross-gabled Italianate style house was built circa 1855 and added to the National Register of Historic Places in 1984.

== History ==
The house was built by Nathan Sumner Williams as a gift to his wife Caroline Thompson Richard. Williams ran a boxboard and sawmill located across the street at "Kings Furnace" in what is currently the Massasoit State Park. The location of the house was not to her liking since it stood so far outside the Green of Taunton where most of the wealthy lived. Mr Williams built another home on Summer Street and the family moved to the new location shortly thereafter. He retained the home on Middleboro Avenue as a place to stop and rest on his long journey to and from work daily. The house boasts 4,200 square feet of living space and is over 7,000 square feet overall. It is a post and beam framed structure with a granite foundation. The wrap around front porch and built up window and door pediments define the Victorian Italianate distinction.

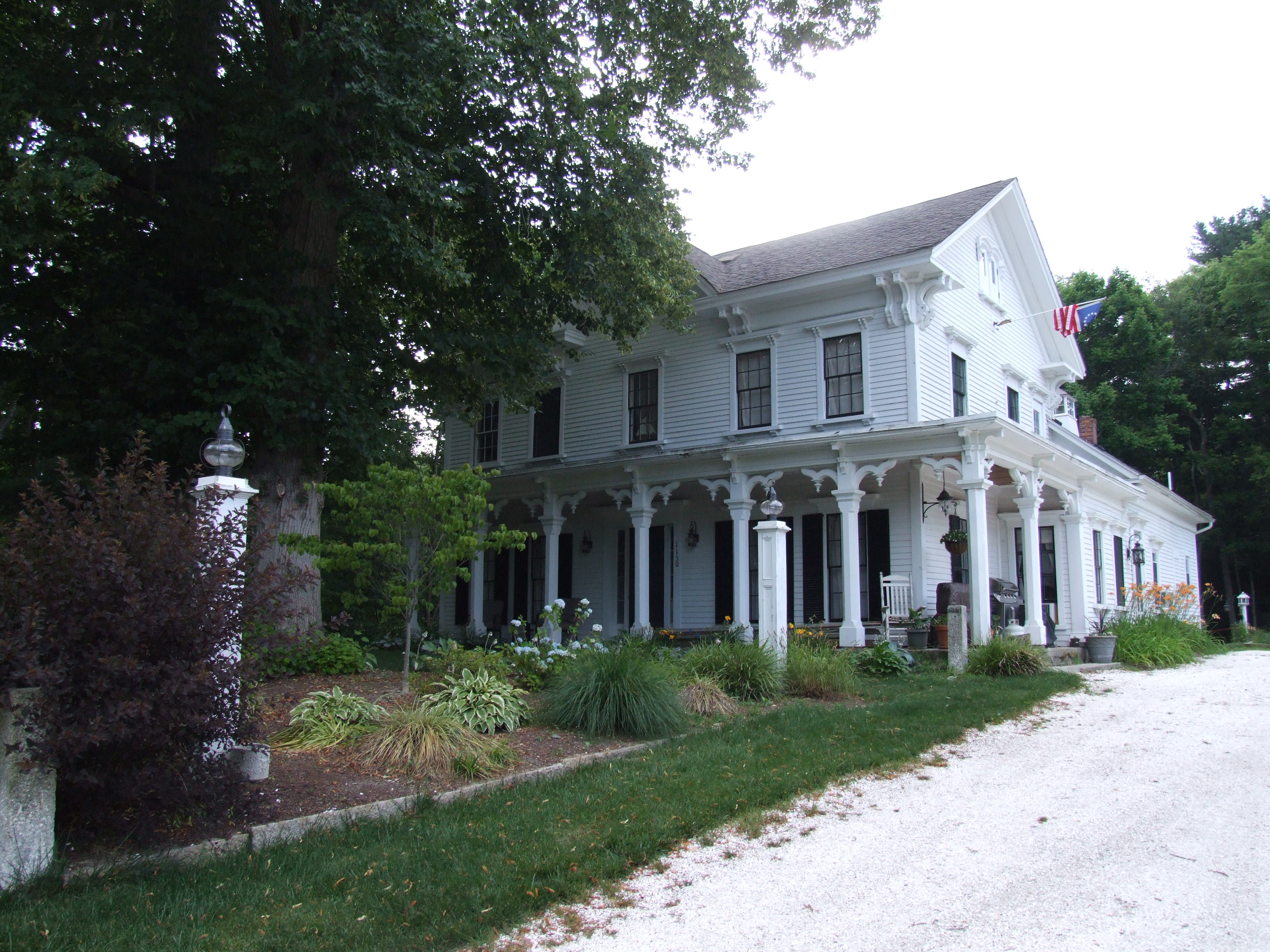
N. S. Williams Side Yard

In November 1903 Mr Williams died and the house was sold to Ed Whitney, an antique dealer. The house became known as the "Maples Inn". Because the home overlooked the major road leading into Taunton from Cape Cod, it was an ideal location for stage coaches to stop for the night.

From 1950 until the middle of the 1960s a family by the name of Simmons had acquired the home. The Simmons ran an upscale nursing home at the location for fifteen years. In the mid-1960s it was sold to Francis and Jonathan Blye. A substantial fire occurred during this period that nearly destroyed the house and all of its history. For several years, the house remained open and exposed to the elements until it was purchased in 1971 by Nina and Bernard Stanton. They made the repairs needed to make the house habitable once again, and took the steps needed to place the home on the National Register of Historic Places. In 2007 the property was purchased by Michael and Heather Woodby.

== See also ==
- National Register of Historic Places listings in Taunton, Massachusetts
