= The Maples =

The Maples may refer to:

== Canada ==
- The Maples (electoral district), a riding in Winnipeg, Manitoba

== United States ==
- The Maples, also known as the Benjamin Van Raalte House, listed on the National Register of Historic Places (NRHP) in Michigan
- The Maples (Smithsburg, Maryland), listed on the NRHP in Maryland
- The Maples (Cazenovia, New York), listed on the NRHP in Oneida County, New York
- The Maples (Rhinebeck, New York), listed on the NRHP in New York
- The Maples (Washington, D.C.), listed on the NRHP in Washington, D.C.
