= Maple, Wisconsin =

Town of Maple, Wisconsin
- Town
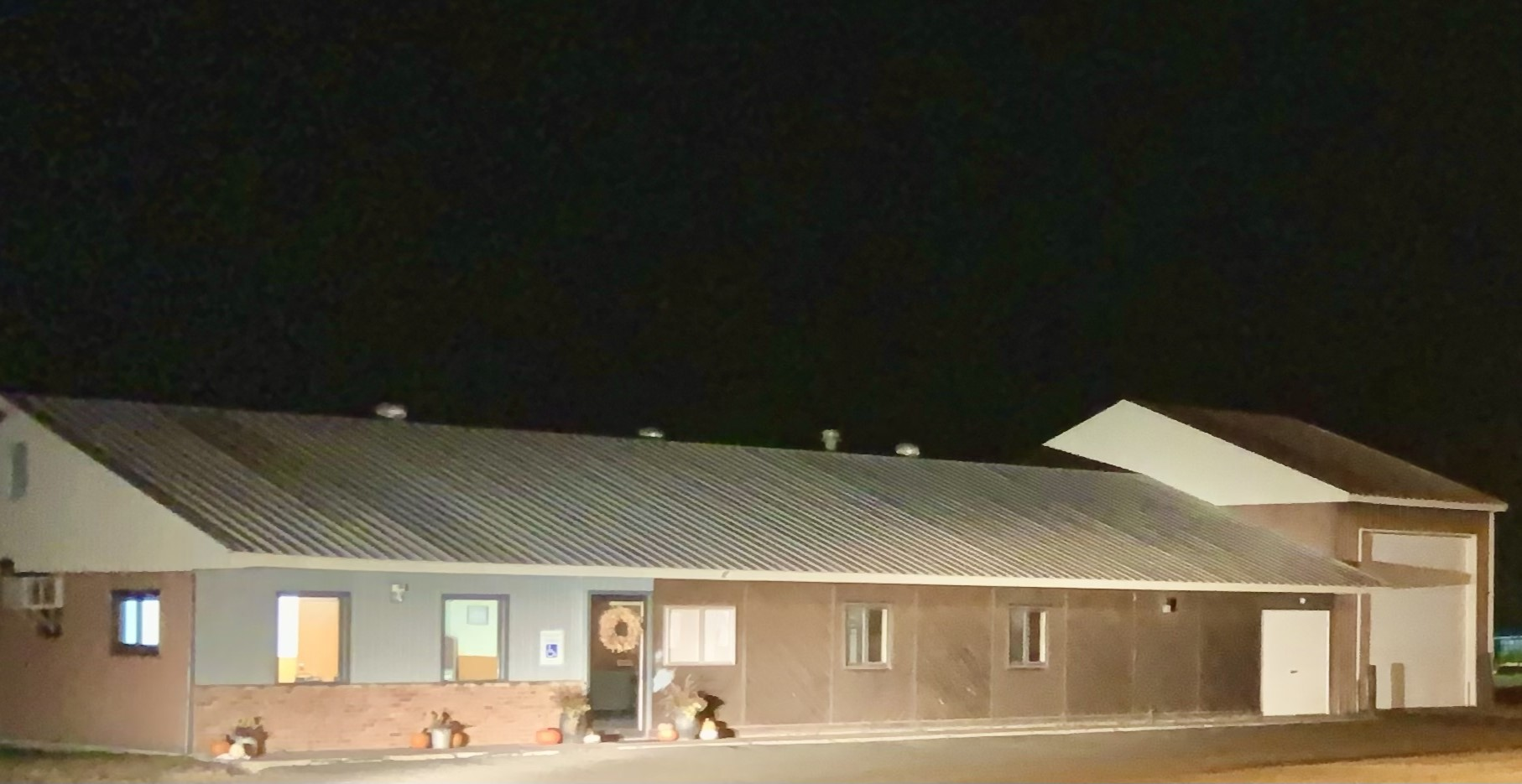
- Town hall

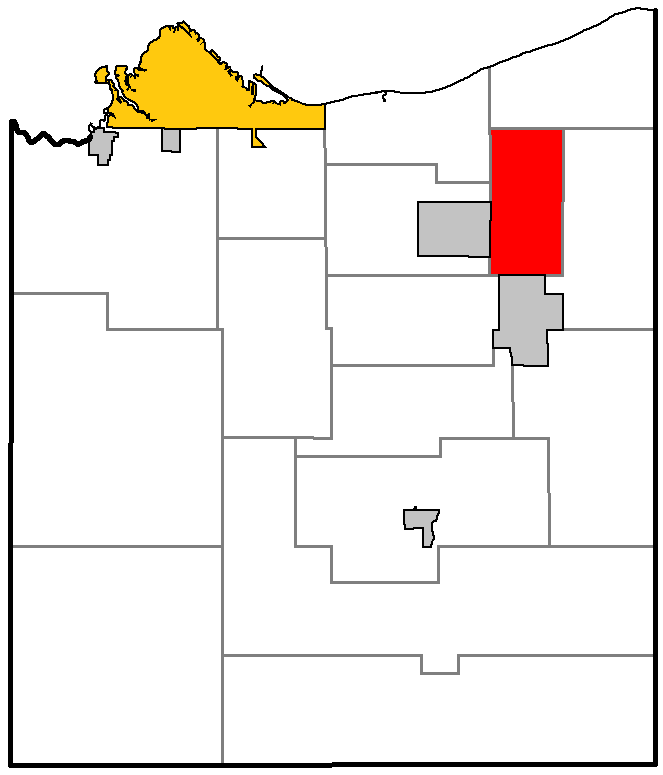
- Location of the Town of Maple, within Douglas County
- Coordinates: 46°36′27″N 91°42′17″W
- Country: United States
- State: Wisconsin
- County: Douglas

Area
  - Total: 32.1 sq mi (83.1 km^{2})
  - Land: 32.1 sq mi (83.1 km^{2})
  - Water: 0 sq mi (0.0 km^{2})
- Elevation: 1,053 ft (321 m)

Population (2020)
  - Total: 700
  - Density: 22/sq mi (8.4/km^{2})
- Time zone: UTC-6 (Central (CST))
  - Summer (DST): UTC-5 (CDT)
- ZIP codes: 54854
- Area codes: 715 and 534
- FIPS code: 55-48725
- GNIS feature ID: 1583639
- Website: Town of Maple, Douglas County, Wisconsin

Maple is a town in Douglas County, Wisconsin, United States. The population was 700 at the 2020 census. The unincorporated communities of Blueberry and Maple are located in the town.

== Infrastructure ==
=== Transportation ===
U.S. Highway 2 serves as a main route in the town.

== History ==
The Town of Maple was founded on December 24, 1906, after Old Brule split into three towns.

== Geography ==
According to the United States Census Bureau, the town has a total area of 32.1 square miles (83.1 km^{2}), all land.

== Demographics ==
As of the census of 2000, there were 649 people, 277 households, and 193 families residing in the town. The population density was 20.2 people per square mile (7.8/km^{2}). There were 303 housing units at an average density of 9.4 per square mile (3.6/km^{2}). The racial makeup of the town was 96.76% White, 2.00% Native American, 0.46% Asian, and 0.77% from two or more races. Hispanic or Latino of any race were 0.77% of the population.

There were 277 households, out of which 31.0% had children under the age of 18 living with them, 58.5% were married couples living together, 5.1% had a female householder with no husband present, and 30.3% were non-families. 25.6% of all households were made up of individuals, and 10.1% had someone living alone who was 65 years of age or older. The average household size was 2.34 and the average family size was 2.81.

In the town, the population was spread out, with 23.6% under the age of 18, 4.8% from 18 to 24, 30.2% from 25 to 44, 27.6% from 45 to 64, and 13.9% who were 65 years of age or older. The median age was 39 years. For every 100 females, there were 105.4 males. For every 100 females age 18 and over, there were 110.2 males.

The median income for a household in the town was $35,781, and the median income for a family was $39,375. Males had a median income of $32,125 versus $24,375 for females. The per capita income for the town was $16,828. About 4.9% of families and 4.7% of the population were below the poverty line, including 5.8% of those under age 18 and none of those age 65 or over.

== Education ==
The Maple School District is roughly 1,500 square miles (3,900 km^{2}) and consists of two villages and nine towns. It operates four schools: Iron River Elementary School, Northwestern Elementary School, Northwestern Middle School, and Northwestern High School.

== Notable people ==
- Reino A. Perala, lawyer, politician
