= William Maples (cricketer) =

English civil servant and cricketer

William Maples (13 June 1820 – 18 May 1854) was an English civil servant in the Indian civil service and a cricketer who played first-class cricket for Cambridge University in 1839. He was born in Islington, London and died at Kolkata, then named Calcutta, in India.

Maples was educated at Winchester College and at Trinity College, Cambridge, where he matriculated in 1838. He played cricket both at school and at Cambridge, and appeared as a lower-order batsman in one match that has been judged to have been first-class, the 1839 University Match between Cambridge University and Oxford University, scoring one run and taking one catch.

Maples appears not to have taken a degree at Cambridge University; in 1840 he entered the Honourable East India Company's service and in 1843 he was recorded as assistant to the Accountant General in Bengal. In the report of The Times of his marriage to Henrietta Westmacott at Calcutta in 1844, he is described as "second son of T. F. Maples, Esq., of Crouch-end, Hornsey". The marriage produced at least one son, Frederick George, who was educated at Highgate School and St John's College, Cambridge and became a Roman Catholic priest.
