= Milwaukee City Conference =

Wisconsin high school athletic conference

The Milwaukee City Conference (also known as "City Conference") is a high school athletic conference in Wisconsin. All full-time member institutions are located in the city of Milwaukee and are members of the Milwaukee Public Schools system.

== History ==
=== 1893-1930 ===
The Milwaukee City Conference was founded in 1893, when Milwaukee opened a second public high school (South Division) and regular athletic competition was established between East Division and South Division High Schools. The first event between these two schools was a track meet in spring of 1894. A third member was added in the fall of 1894 when West Division High School opened, and two years later football became a conference sport when East Division and South Division met on the gridiron for the first time. In 1906, Boys Technical and Trade High School (now Bradley Tech) and North Division High School both opened, after which they became conference members. By 1920, the conference had added three more schools in Washington (1911), Bay View (1914) and Lincoln (1920). During this time period, the City Conference established themselves as a dominant force in track and field, taking the team title in twenty-five WIAA competitions between 1895 and 1929.

=== 1930-1966 ===
The City Conference added a ninth member in 1930, one year after the village of North Milwaukee was annexed into the City of Milwaukee. The village had its own high school prior to annexation, and after North Milwaukee High School was absorbed into MPS it became Custer High School in order to avoid confusion with North Division. One year later, interscholastic basketball was reinstated as a City Conference sport after it was discontinued during the early 1900s due to lack of adequate facilities. Three new high schools were built in consecutive years in the 1930s as Works Progress Administration projects: Juneau (1932), Pulaski (1933) and Rufus King (1934). All became members of the City Conference after opening and varsity competition coincided with each school's first senior class. Membership remained stable at twelve schools until the 1960s. John Marshall High School was opened as a combination junior/senior high school on the city's north side in 1961 (varsity competition began in 1963), and two high schools were added in 1966 as a direct result of Milwaukee’s annexation of unincorporated areas in the years prior: James Madison High School in the former town of Granville and Alexander Hamilton High School in the former town of Greenfield. Granville already had its own high school at this time, and when their district lost territory due to annexation, it was renamed Brown Deer High School after the village where it was located.

=== 1966-1993 ===
A few years after the opening of Hamilton and Madison, the City Conference's football roster subdivided along geographic lines for the 1971 season. Northern schools competed in the Gold Division and southern schools were placed in the Blue Division:

Blue Division	Gold Division
Bay View	Custer
Boys Tech	Madison
Hamilton	Marshall
Juneau	North Division
Lincoln	Riverside
Pulaski	Rufus King
South Division	Washington
West Division	

In 1979, Lincoln High School closed and Harold S. Vincent High School opened on the city's far northwest side as a replacement. In the years prior, realignment of the high school athletic conferences in southeastern Wisconsin was discussed extensively, driven mostly by the WIAA's desire to get the high schools in Racine and Kenosha into a larger conference after they were forced out of the Big Eight Conference in 1970. The five-member South Shore Conference was created as a result, and competition lasted for ten years before its dissolution. Two members of the South Shore (Kenosha Tremper and Racine Park) joined the City Conference, and four of the City Conference's smaller members joined the Suburban Conference (Juneau, Riverside, Rufus King and West Division). Due to the expansion of the conference's geographic footprint, the conference was briefly known as the Milwaukee Area Conference (MAC). The two-division football alignment was scrapped for the 1980 season, only to return for 1981 and continue until the next realignment. The newly renamed conference made a slight adjustment in 1983 when Kenosha Bradford joined from the Braveland Conference to replace Racine Park after their exit to the Suburban Conference. The high schools in Kenosha left the MAC in 1985, taking four schools on the south side of Milwaukee with them (Bay View, Hamilton, Pulaski and South Division) and rejoining with the Racine high schools to form the Big Nine Conference. During that same year, the four high schools who left for the Suburban Conference rejoined after it was realigned out of existence, and the MAC changed its name back to the Milwaukee City Conference. West Division also dropped their athletic program that year when they became the Milwaukee High School of the Arts. The four south side Milwaukee high schools that were placed in the Big Nine did not want this realignment and threatened to sue the WIAA to rejoin the City Conference. Their efforts were successful in 1993, as all four schools made their return to the conference.

=== 1993-present ===
With the City Conference made whole again after the 1993 realignment, new schools continued to join the conference after they opened. The conference was also partitioned into two divisions for football, named after former coaches Lisle Blackbourn (Washington) and James Richardson (Tech):

Blackbourn Division	Richardson Division
Custer	Bay View
Juneau	Hamilton
Marshall	Madison
North Division	Pulaski
Riverside	South Division
Rufus King	Tech
Vincent	Washington

Milwaukee School of Languages and Wisconsin Conservatory of Lifelong Learning joined in 2000 and 2001, respectively. Malcolm X Academy joined the City Conference in 2003 and left when it closed four years later. Solomon Juneau High School closed in 2006, reopening in 2012 as MacDowell Montessori School (the athletics program still competes under the Juneau banner). Northwest Secondary School and Reagan College Prep High School in the former Town of Lake took the place of Malcolm X Academy when it opened in 2007. Three more school openings rounded out the membership of the City Conference: Carmen in 2014 (replacing Northwest after their closing in 2013), Golda Meir in 2016 and Audubon Tech in 2022.

=== Football (2020-present) ===
In February 2019, the WIAA and the Wisconsin Football Coaches Association unveiled a sweeping football-only realignment for Wisconsin to begin with the 2020 football season and run on a two-year cycle. The City Conference maintained their alignment from the year before and it remained in place through the 2022-2023 realignment cycle. In 2024, Reagan Prep and Washington swapped divisions, with Reagan joining the Richardson Division and Washington taking their place in the Blackbourn Division. For the 2026-2027 competition cycle, the City Conference will be adding two new members and losing one. Full members Milwaukee School of Languages will join the Richardson Division as a stand-alone program after involvement with Marshall's football co-operative. They will be replacing Rufus King, which is aligned with the Southeast Conference as a football-only member for at least the next two years. Finally, Fuller Collegiate Academy will be joining as an affiliate member (primarily in the Lake City Conference) in the Blackbourn Division.

== List of member schools ==
=== Current members ===
School	Location	Affiliation	Enrollment	Mascot	Colors	Joined
Audubon Tech	Milwaukee, WI	Public	445	Cardinals		2022
Bay View	Milwaukee, WI	Public	935	Redcats		1914, 1993
Bradley Tech (Note: Known as Boys Technical and Trade High School from 1906-1975 and Milwaukee Tech from 1975-2002)	Milwaukee, WI	Public	961	Trojans		1906
Carmen Northwest	Milwaukee, WI	Charter	379	Eagles		2014
Carmen Southgate	Milwaukee, WI	Charter	1,483	Eagles		2026
Golda Meir	Milwaukee, WI	Public	592	Owls		2016
Hamilton	Milwaukee, WI	Public	1,351	Wildcats		1966, 1993
High School of the Arts (Note: Known as West Division High School from 1894-1985)	Milwaukee, WI	Public	971	Crimson Stars (Note: Nickname was Redmen prior to 1985)		1894, 1985
Juneau (Note: Athletics program from MacDowell Montessori School plays under Juneau banner)	Milwaukee, WI	Public	234	Pioneers		1935, 1985, 2012
Madison University	Milwaukee, WI	Public	484	Knights		1966
Marshall	Milwaukee, WI	Public	718	Eagles		1963
North Division	Milwaukee, WI	Public	309	Blue Devils		1906
Obama SCTE (Note: Known as Custer High School from 1929-2011)	Milwaukee, WI	Public	397	Cougars (Note: Nickname was Indians prior to 1992)		1930
Pulaski	Milwaukee, WI	Public	1,169	Rams		1936, 1993
Reagan Prep (Note: Known as Town of Lake College Preparatory High School prior to 2004)	Milwaukee, WI	Public	1,370	Huskies		2007
Riverside University (Note: Known as East Division High School from 1893-1915)	Milwaukee, WI	Public	1,567	Tigers		1893, 1985
Rufus King	Milwaukee, WI	Public	1,254	Generals		1937, 1985
School of Languages	Milwaukee, WI	Public	523	Hawks		2000
South Division	Milwaukee, WI	Public	1,183	Cardinals		1893, 1993
Vincent	Milwaukee, WI	Public	831	Vikings		1979
Washington	Milwaukee, WI	Public	692	Purgolders		1911
Wisconsin Conservatory of Lifelong Learning	Milwaukee, WI	Public	111	Wizards		2001

=== Associate members ===
School	Location	Affiliation	Enrollment	Mascot	Colors	Sport(s)
Fuller Collegiate Academy	Milwaukee, WI	Charter	519	Lions		Football

=== Former members ===
School	Location	Affiliation	Mascot	Colors	Joined	Left	Conference Joined	Current Conference
Kenosha Bradford	Kenosha, WI	Public	Red Devils		1983	1985	Big Nine	Southeast
Kenosha Tremper	Kenosha, WI	Public	Trojans		1980	1985	Big Nine	Southeast
Lincoln	Milwaukee, WI	Public	Comets		1920	1979	Closed	
Malcolm X Academy	Milwaukee, WI	Charter	Maroons		2003	2007	Closed	
Northwest	Milwaukee, WI	Public	Eagles		2007	2013	Closed (replaced by Carmen Northwest)	
Racine Park	Racine, WI	Public	Panthers		1980	1983	Suburban	Southeast

== Membership timeline ==
=== Football members ===
Blue Division Gold Division Blackbourn Division Richardson Division

== Membership map ==
Milwaukee City Conference
Location of Milwaukee City Conference full members:
1 Audubon Tech
2 Bay View
3 Bradley Tech
4 Carmen Northwest
5 Carmen Southgate
6 Golda Meir
7 Hamilton
8 High School of the Arts
9 Juneau
10 Madison University
11 Marshall
12 North Division
13 Obama SCTE
14 Pulaski
15 Reagan Prep
16 Riverside University
17 Rufus King
18 School of Languages
19 South Division
20 Vincent
21 Washington
22 WCLL

== Sponsored sports ==
	Baseball	Boys Basketball	Girls Basketball	Boys Cross Country	Girls Cross Country	Football	Boys Golf	Girls Golf	Boys Soccer	Girls Soccer	Softball	Boys Swim & Dive	Girls Swim & Dive	Boys Tennis	Girls Tennis	Boys Track & Field	Girls Track & Field	Girls Volleyball	Boys Wrestling	Girls Wrestling
Audubon Tech		●					● (Note: Co-operative with Hamilton)		●	●			●					●		
Bay View	●	●	●			●	●		●	●	●			●	●	●	●	●	● (Note: Co-operative with South Division) (Note: Co-operative with Wisconsin Conservatory of Lifelong Learning)	●
Bradley Tech	● (Note: Co-operative with High School of the Arts)	●	●	●	●	●	● (Note: Co-operative with Carmen Northwest)	●	●		●			● (Note: Co-operative with Carmen Southgate) (Note: Co-operative with Pulaski)	●	●	●	●	● (Note: Co-operative with Juneau)	●
Carmen Northwest		●	●															●		
Carmen Southgate		●		●	●				●	●									●	●
Golda Meir		●	●				●	●	●						● (Note: Co-operative with Riverside University)			●		
Hamilton	● (Note: Co-operative with Audubon Tech)	●	●	●	●	●			●		●	●	●	●	●	●	●	●	●	●
High School of the Arts		●							●	● (Note: Co-operative with Bradley Tech)				●	●			●		
Juneau		●	●	●	●		●							●		●	●	●		
Madison University		●	●			●					● (Note: Co-operative with Fuller Collegiate Academy) (Note: Co-operative with Marshall)					●	●	●	● (Note: Co-operative with Vincent)	●
Marshall		●	●			●	●			● (Note: Co-operative with Madison University)						● (Note: Co-operative with School of Languages)	●	●	●	●
North Division		●	●	●	●	●								●		●	●	● (Note: Co-operative with Washington)		
Obama SCTE		●	●			●	●									●	●			
Pulaski	●	●	●	●	●	●			●	●	●	●	●			●	●	●	●	●
Reagan Prep	●	●	●	●	●	●	●	●	●	●	●	●	●	●	●	●	●	●	● (Note: Co-operative with Salam)	●
Riverside University	● (Note: Co-operative with Golda Meir)	●	●	●	●	●	●	●	●	●	●	●	●	●		●	●	●	●	●
Rufus King	●	●	●	●	●		●	●	●	●	●	● (Note: Co-operative with North Division)	●	●	●	●	●	●	●	●
School of Languages	●	●	●	●	●	●	●	●	●	●	●			●	●			●		
South Division	●	●	●			●	●	●	●	●	●			●	●	●	●	●		
Vincent	●	●	●	●	●	●	●	●	●		●				●	●	●	●		
Washington	● (Note: Co-operative with Obama SCTE)	●	●	●	●	●	●	●	●		●				●	●	●		●	●
WCLL		●	●	●	●											●	●			

== List of state champions ==
=== Fall sports ===
Boys Cross Country
School	Year	Division
East Division	1913	Single Division
East Division	1914	Single Division
Riverside	1915	Single Division
Riverside	1916	Single Division
Riverside	1917	Single Division
Riverside	1918	Single Division
Riverside	1919	Single Division
Riverside	1920	Single Division
South Division	1921	Single Division
South Division	1922	Single Division
Riverside	1923	Single Division
Riverside	1924	Single Division
Riverside	1925	Single Division
Riverside	1926	Single Division
Riverside	1927	Single Division
Riverside	1928	Single Division
Washington	1930	Single Division
South Division	1931	Single Division
Bay View	1932	Single Division
Washington	1932	Single Division
Riverside	1933	Large Schools
Washington	1935	Single Division
Riverside	1936	Single Division
Rufus King	1942	Single Division
Bay View	1943	Single Division
Bay View	1944	Single Division
Bay View	1945	Single Division
Washington	1952	Large Schools
Lincoln	1953	Small Schools
Lincoln	1954	Small Schools
Lincoln	1958	Small Schools
North Division	1958	Medium Schools
Bay View	1959	Large Schools
Bay View	1960	Large Schools
North Division	1960	Medium Schools
Lincoln	1963	Small Schools
Washington	1964	Large Schools
Marshall	1970	Large Schools

Girls Volleyball
School	Year	Division
Madison	1977	Class A

=== Winter sports ===
Boys Basketball
School	Year	Division
Lincoln	1959	Single Division
Lincoln	1961	Single Division
Lincoln	1962	Single Division
Lincoln	1966	Single Division
Lincoln	1967	Single Division
Hamilton	1972	Class A
Tech	1979	Class A
North Division	1980	Class A
Madison	1981	Class A (Vacated)
Tech	1983	Class A
Rufus King	1984	Class A
Washington	1985	Class A
Washington	1987	Class A
Washington	1990	Class A
Rufus King	1991	Class A
Washington	1993	Division 1
Rufus King	1995	Division 1
Vincent	1996	Division 1
Vincent	1997	Division 1
Vincent	1998	Division 1
Vincent	2000	Division 1
Vincent	2001	Division 1
Rufus King	2003	Division 1
Rufus King	2004	Division 1
Juneau	2026	Division 4

The City Conference did not allow its teams to compete in the WIAA tournament until the 1951-52 season.

Girls Basketball
School	Year	Division
Washington	1979	Class A
Washington	1990	Class A
Washington	1994	Division 1
Washington	1995	Division 1
Washington	1996	Division 1
Vincent	2007	Division 1
Vincent	2008	Division 1
Vincent	2009	Division 1
Riverside University	2013	Division 1

Boys Gymnastics
School	Year	Division
Marshall	1967	Single Division
Bay View	1968	Single Division
Bay View	1971	Single Division
Madison	1977	Single Division

Girls Gymnastics
School	Year	Division
Custer	1972	Single Division
Bay View	1974	Single Division

Boys Swimming & Diving
School	Year	Division
West Division	1925	Single Division
Bay View	1927	Single Division
Bay View	1928	Single Division

Boys Wrestling
School	Year	Division
Washington	1940	Single Division
Washington	1941	Single Division
Washington	1942	Single Division
South Division	1947	Single Division
South Division	1950	Single Division
South Division	1951	Single Division
South Division	1952	Single Division
South Division	1953	Single Division
South Division	1954	Single Division
South Division	1958	Single Division
Rufus King	1959	Single Division
Pulaski	1961	Single Division

=== Spring sports ===
Baseball
School	Year	Division
Boys Tech	1948	Single Division
Tech	1985	Class A

Boys Golf
School	Year	Division
Washington	1938	Single Division

Softball
School	Year	Division
Bay View	1985	Class A

Boys Tennis
School	Year	Division
Washington	1926	Single Division
Washington	1928	Single Division
Washington	1932	Single Division
Washington	1942	Single Division
Riverside	1950	Single Division

Boys Track & Field
School	Year	Division
East Division	1895	Single Division
East Division	1896	Single Division
West Division	1898	Single Division
East Division	1899	Single Division
West Division	1900	Single Division
East Division	1903	Single Division
East Division	1905	Single Division
South Division	1906	Single Division
South Division	1908	Single Division
West Division	1912	Single Division
West Division	1914	Single Division
East Division	1915	Single Division
West Division	1916	Single Division
Riverside	1917	Single Division
North Division	1918	Single Division
West Division	1919	Single Division
Riverside	1920	Class A
Riverside	1921	Class A
Riverside	1922	Class A
Riverside	1923	Class A
Washington	1924	Class A
Riverside	1925	Class A
Washington	1926	Class A
Bay View	1928	Class A
Washington	1929	Class A
South Division	1930	Class A
Riverside	1931	Class A
West Division	1932	Class A
Riverside	1935	Class A
Riverside	1936	Class A
Washington	1938	Class A
Washington	1939	Class A
Washington	1940	Class A
Washington	1941	Class A
Washington	1945	Class A
Washington	1946	Class A
Washington	1951	Class A
Rufus King	1955	Class A
North Division	1958	Class A
North Division	1960	Class A
North Division	1961	Class A
Bay View	1966	Class A
South Division	1975	Class A
Custer	1977	Class A
Custer	1979	Class A
Custer	1981	Class A
South Division	1985	Class A
North Division	1992	Division 1
Tech	1995	Division 1
Vincent	2001	Division 1
Vincent	2003	Division 1
Vincent	2005	Division 1
Marshall/ School of Languages	2007	Division 1

Girls Track & Field
School	Year	Division
Riverside University	1986	Class A
Rufus King	1989	Class A
Marshall	1990	Class A
Tech	1996	Division 1
Rufus King	2002	Division 1
Bradley Tech	2009	Division 1
Bradley Tech	2011	Division 1
Riverside University	2012	Division 1
Rufus King	2016	Division 1
Rufus King	2017	Division 1

== List of conference champions ==
=== Boys Basketball ===
School	Quantity	Years
Washington	23	1936, 1939, 1940, 1959, 1977, 1978, 1979, 1980, 1981, 1985, 1987, 1988, 1990, 1991, 1993, 2000, 2008, 2009, 2013, 2017, 2018, 2019, 2025
Rufus King	17	1948, 1952, 1971, 1992, 1994, 1995, 1996, 1997, 1999, 2003, 2004, 2006, 2012, 2013, 2015, 2020, 2022
Lincoln	13	1932, 1933, 1934, 1937, 1938, 1942, 1948, 1960, 1961, 1962, 1966, 1967, 1974
South Division	13	1939, 1944, 1945, 1948, 1949, 1953, 1954, 1955, 1956, 1957, 1982, 2024, 2025
Vincent	10	1998, 1999, 2000, 2001, 2002, 2004, 2005, 2007, 2017, 2026
Bradley (Tech)	9	1939, 1941, 1946, 1973, 1983, 1984, 1986, 1989, 2022
North Division	7	1935, 1958, 1963, 1964, 1965, 1968, 1969
Hamilton	5	1972, 2009, 2010, 2014, 2024
(East Division) Riverside	5	1947, 1979, 2011, 2016, 2017
Juneau	4	2019, 2024, 2025, 2026
Marshall	4	1970, 1976, 1980, 2023
Bay View	3	1999, 2000, 2026
Carmen Northwest	3	2020, 2022, 2023
Golda Meir	3	2018, 2019, 2026
Pulaski	3	1943, 1951, 1952
West Division	3	1938, 1950, 1952
Madison	2	1973, 1975
Audubon Tech	1	2023
(Custer) Obama SCTE	1	1976
Kenosha Bradford	0	
Kenosha Tremper	0	
Malcolm X Academy	0	
Northwest	0	
Racine Park	0	
Reagan Prep	0	
School of Languages	0	
WCLL	0	

=== Girls Basketball ===
School	Quantity	Years
Washington	20	1979, 1980, 1981, 1982, 1984, 1985, 1986, 1989, 1990, 1992, 1993, 1994, 1995, 1996, 1997, 1998, 1999, 2000, 2001, 2002
Rufus King	18	1987, 2003, 2004, 2006, 2008, 2009, 2012, 2014, 2015, 2016, 2017, 2018, 2019, 2020, 2022, 2023, 2024, 2026
Vincent	10	1998, 1999, 2000, 2001, 2007, 2009, 2010, 2011, 2018, 2026
Marshall	9	1976, 1980, 1981, 1995, 1996, 1997, 1999, 2010, 2014
Riverside	5	1978, 1979, 2005, 2013, 2015
Bradley (Tech)	4	1988, 2006, 2011, 2025
Hamilton	4	1978, 1983, 2006, 2018
North Division	4	2008, 2015, 2016, 2023
Pulaski	4	1975, 2003, 2007, 2012
School of Languages	4	2009, 2010, 2013, 2024
Bay View	3	2004, 2016, 2017
Golda Meir	3	2017, 2019, 2025
Madison	2	1980, 2005
(Custer) Obama SCTE	2	2005, 2010
Reagan Prep	2	2018, 2022
West Division	2	1976, 1977
Juneau	1	2024
Carmen Northwest	0	
Kenosha Bradford	0	
Kenosha Tremper	0	
Lincoln	0	
Malcolm X Academy	0	
Northwest	0	
Racine Park	0	
South Division	0	
Champions from 1991 unknown

=== Football ===
School	Quantity	Years
Bradley (Tech)	33	1952, 1954, 1957, 1959, 1960, 1964, 1965, 1966, 1967, 1969, 1972, 1973, 1974, 1975, 1977, 1978, 1979, 1981, 1983, 1985, 1986, 1987, 1988, 1992, 1993, 1994, 1995, 1996, 1997, 2000, 2003, 2007, 2009
(East Division) Riverside	24	1902, 1908, 1910, 1915, 1919, 1920, 1922, 1923, 1926, 1930, 1932, 1933, 1934, 1935, 1936, 1950, 1999, 2001, 2006, 2008, 2010, 2011, 2016, 2018
South Division	24	1896, 1897, 1898, 1900, 1901, 1903, 1904, 1905, 1906, 1907, 1909, 1910, 1911, 1912, 1913, 1918, 1920, 1929, 1940, 1941, 1944, 1954, 2007, 2008
Rufus King	23	1955, 1956, 1958, 1960, 1963, 1970, 1971, 1972, 1996, 2004, 2005, 2006, 2012, 2013, 2014, 2015, 2016, 2017, 2019, 2021, 2022, 2023, 2024
Washington	21	1921, 1930, 1931, 1937, 1938, 1939, 1942, 1943, 1944, 1945, 1946, 1948, 1953, 1954, 1961, 1989, 1990, 1991, 1998, 1999, 2023
(Custer) Obama SCTE	9	1945, 1995, 1997, 1998, 2000, 2002, 2003, 2004, 2024
Vincent	8	1982, 1993, 1994, 1997, 2000, 2001, 2004, 2022
Madison	7	1973, 1975, 1976, 1977, 1978, 1983, 2004
West Division	7	1914, 1917, 1919, 1924, 1925, 1927, 1938
Bay View	6	1936, 1957, 2002, 2005, 2017, 2025
Marshall	6	1966, 1968, 1974, 1984, 2017, 2022
North Division	6	1910, 1916, 1919, 1924, 1944, 1945
Pulaski	5	1949, 1950, 1953, 1962, 2023
Reagan Prep	5	2018, 2019, 2021, 2025, 2026
Kenosha Tremper	3	1980, 1981, 1984
Lincoln	3	1928, 1929, 1947
Hamilton	2	1976, 2015
Fuller Collegiate Academy	1	2026
Juneau	1	1971
Racine Park	1	1982
Kenosha Bradford	0	
Malcolm X Academy	0	
School of Languages	0	

== See also ==
List of high school athletic conferences in Wisconsin
