= Armand Muth =

American musician

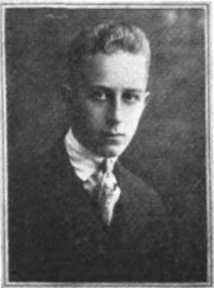
Portrait of Armand W. Muth, c. 1923

Armand W. Muth (1900–1948) was a 20th-century American pianist, composer and piano roll artist. He is remembered by music collectors and historians for cutting thousands of personal arrangements for piano rolls in the early to mid 20th century sold throughout the United States and overseas. He was a contemporary of piano roll artist Robert Billings.

== Early life ==
Armand Waldemar Muth was born into a German-American family in Milwaukee, Wisconsin on March 24, 1900. His parents were Waldemer Aloysius Muth and Ninon Jacobi Muth. Muth was largely self-taught on the piano, playing by ear. He was introduced to player pianos at a young age, after his Father purchased a player piano, on which Muth experimented in roll-making as a pastime. He attended Washington High School in Milwaukee, playing the piano for student vaudeville productions.

== Career ==
Muth was employed as a maintenance man at a piano roll business before being discovered by staff, after which he was hired as a piano roll artist. He first made rolls for the U.S. Music Company of Chicago. Muth was most active at the Billings Roll Co. and related Staffnote Corporation in Milwaukee during the 1920s, which he later acquired from the Billings Roll Co. He joined Staffnote about the year 1920, and was appointed recording department manager in 1923. He published very little sheet music of his own compositions, most of which were only issued on piano rolls. He made one known unissued recording for Paramount Records in 1924 of his own composition, "All My Own".

Muth was also active at radio station WCAY of Milwaukee as a radio performer in the early 1920s. He was billed by WCAY as "popular pianist". He was heard among other musicians and dignitaries over station WEBL in conjunction with RCA at the 1924 Wisconsin State Fair.

Acquiring piano roll equipment from the former Billings firm, Muth continued to make rolls into the early 1930s under his own Playrite label. He continued to produce rolls after moving to Minnesota, with the same equipment. In 1942, he was employed at 'Bob and Jen's Tavern' in the city of Hopkins. Muth remained active as a self-employed musician in Minnesota up until his death in 1948. He was last a resident of Faribault.
