= North Division High School =

North Division High School may refer to:

- North Division High School (Chicago)
- North Division High School (Milwaukee)
