= WCLL =

WCLL may refer to:

- WCLL-CD, a TV station in Columbus, Ohio
- West Central Lacrosse League (WCLL), the former name of the West Central Senior Lacrosse League, an amateur box lacrosse league
- Western Collegiate Lacrosse League (WCLL), a conference in the Men's Collegiate Lacrosse Association
- Wisconsin Conservatory of Lifelong Learning (WCLL), a Public Schools district school in Milwaukee, Wisconsin
