= Washington High School of Information Technology =

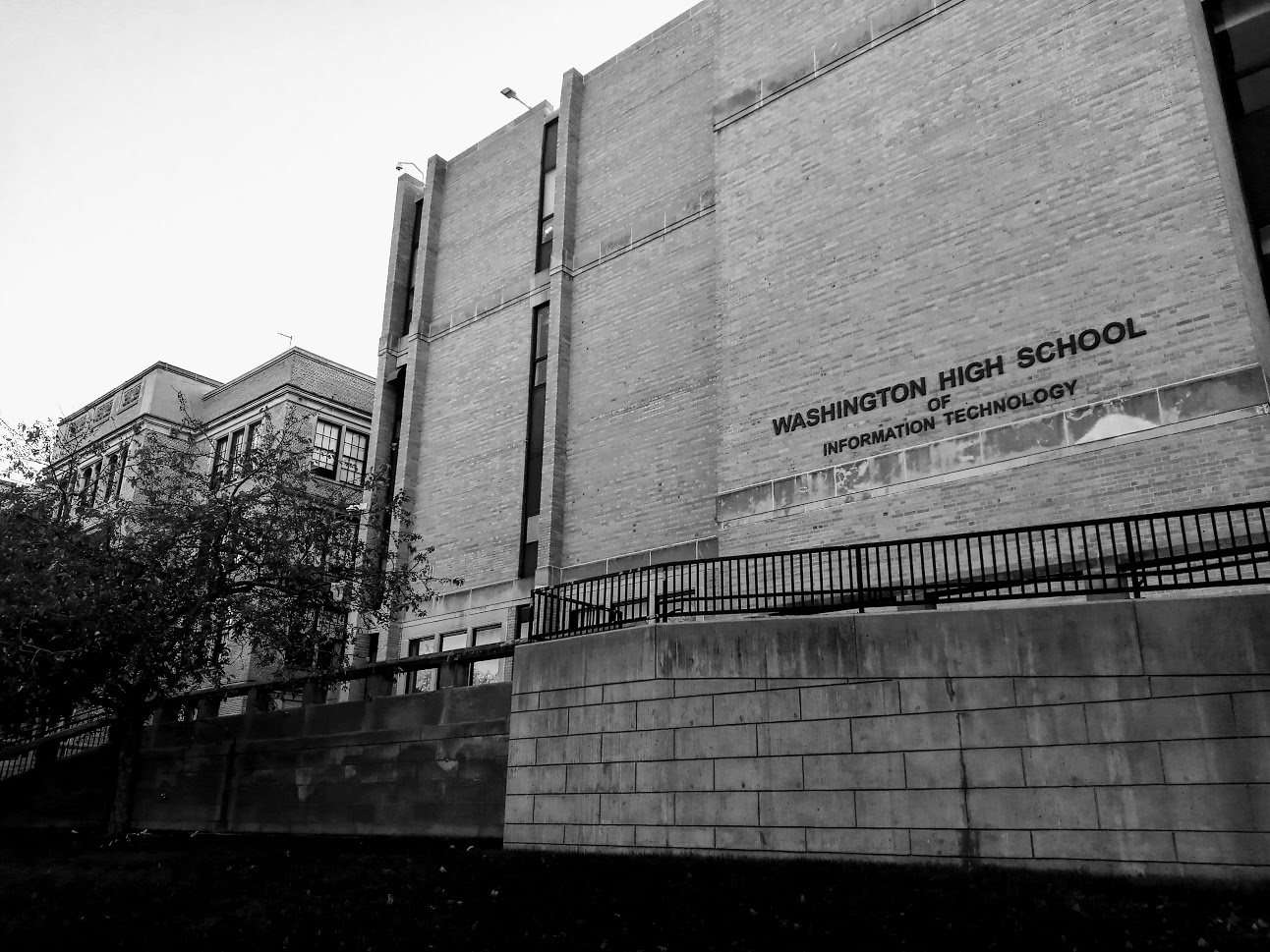

Location
- 2525 North Sherman Blvd. Milwaukee, Wisconsin; United States
- 43°03′55.0″N 87°58′05.5″W

Information
- Type: Public (magnet) secondary
- Established: 1912
- School district: Milwaukee Public Schools
- Teaching staff: 18.06 (FTE)
- Grades: 9–12
- Enrollment: 379 (2023-2024)
- Student to teacher ratio: 20.98
- Colors: purple and gold
- Nickname: Purgolders
- Website: mps.school/washington/

Washington High School of Information Technology (formerly Washington High School) is a magnet high school located in the Sherman Park neighborhood on the north side of Milwaukee, Wisconsin, United States. It is one of the oldest schools in the Milwaukee Public Schools system, and was founded in 1911.

In September 2005 Washington was divided into three "schools within a school," which are divided among the school's four floors. These are the School of Law, Education, and Public Service; Washington High School of Expeditionary Learning; and Washington High School of Information Technology. In June 2010, LEAPS closed and was combined with EL and renamed Washington High School. The Washington High School of Information Technology, which continues the legacy of the Career Specialty Program begun in 1976, has continued to operate.

In June 2011 the combined LEAPS and EL school was closed and merged into Washington High School of Information Technology, creating a single school again.

== Athletics ==
Washington's athletic teams are known as the Purgolders, named for the school's colors of purple and gold. It competes in the Milwaukee City Conference.

Washington has garnered four boys basketball Division 1 state titles since 1985. It is part of an intense three-way rivalry with Rufus King High School and Vincent High School. These schools have accounted for 14 of the last 23 state titles in Division 1 boys basketball.

The girls' basketball team is one of three Milwaukee City Conference girls teams to have won a WIAA state title (Harold S. Vincent High School and Riverside University High School are the others), having done it five times, a Division 1 record. They also won three consecutive state titles (1994, 1995 and 1996).

Washington won the state championship in boys' cross country in 1930 and 1935 and tied for the championship with Bay View High School in 1932 in single-division contests, won the 1952 championship in the larger of two divisions, and won the 1964 championship in the largest of three divisions.

=== Athletic conference affiliation history ===
- Milwaukee City Conference (1911-1980)
- Milwaukee Area Conference (1980-1985)
- Milwaukee City Conference (1985–present)

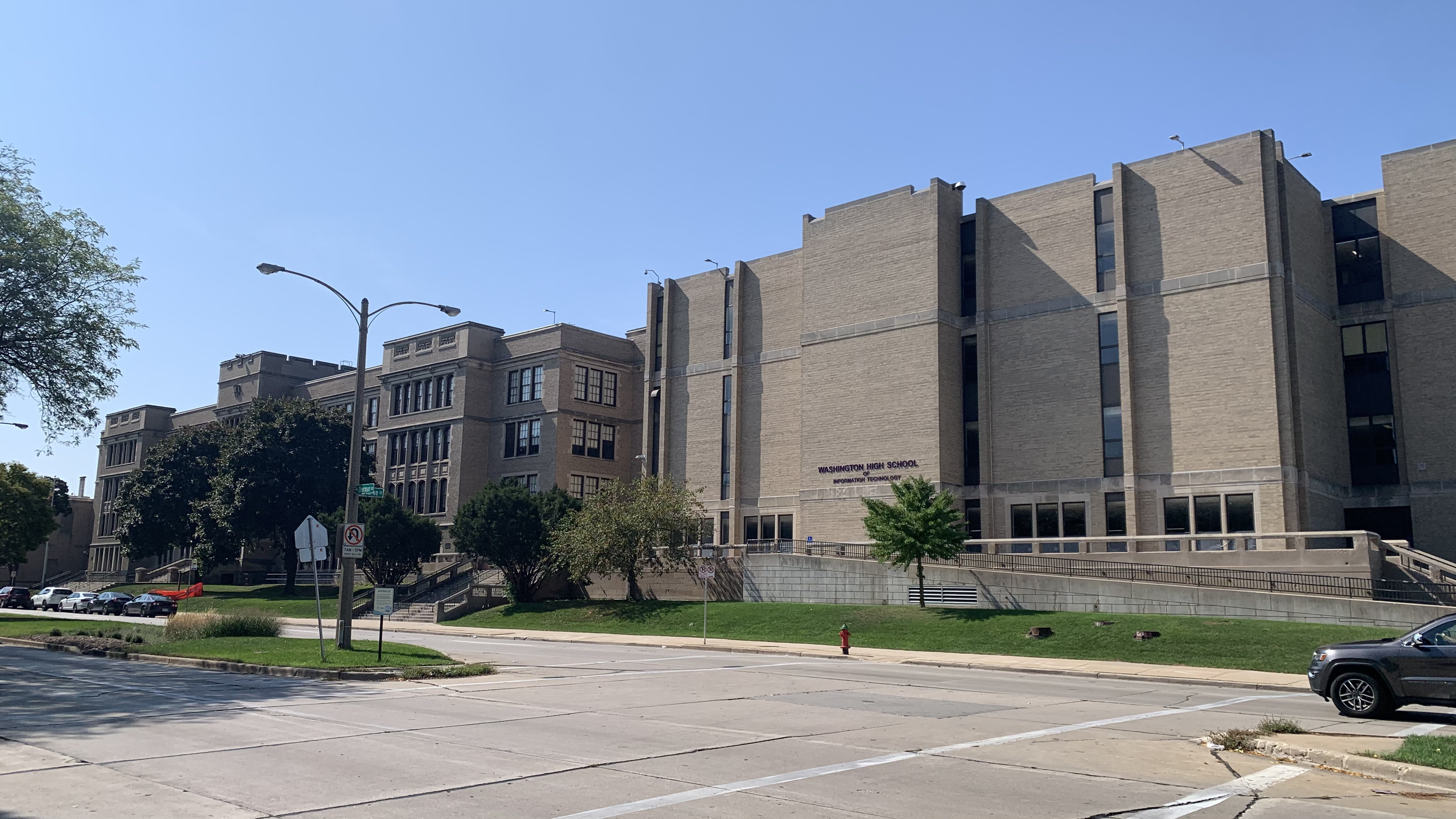
Washington High School in 2023

== Demographics ==
- 77% Black, 774 students
- 15% Asian/Pacific Islander, 150 students
- 8% Hispanic, 80 students
- 0% American Indian/Alaska Native, 2 students

== Notable alumni ==
- Brian Burke, Wisconsin politician and legislator
- Wally Cruice, NFL scout
- Lee S. Dreyfus, Governor of Wisconsin
- Michael Feldman, host of radio show Whad'Ya Know?
- Michael Foster Jr. (born 2003), basketball power forward in the Israeli Basketball Premier League
- Earle W. Fricker, Wisconsin politician
- Pat Harder, UW-Madison and NFL player, 3× NFL scoring leader
- Cy Howard, writer, director and producer
- Otto Junkermann, former Wisconsin State Representative, former Brown County Supervisor
- Norman R. Klug, Wisconsin politician
- Herb Kohl (1935–2023), U.S. Senator, businessman, and philanthropist
- Tom Laughlin, actor, filmmaker, educator, activist, and perennial candidate
- Newton N. Minow (1926–2023), attorney, served as chairman of the Federal Communications Commission
- Abner Joseph Mikva (1926–2016), Chief Judge of the U.S. Court of Appeals for the District of Columbia Circuit, White House Counsel, Member of the U.S. House of Representatives, and legal scholar
- John Allen Paulos, writer, speaker, mathematics professor; wrote Innumeracy: Mathematical Illiteracy
- Stan Pelecky, Wisconsin politician
- Lois Plous, Member of the Wisconsin State Assembly
- Jack (Jackie) Porter, WHS, Class of 1962---sociologist, writer, and political activist
- Mark Ryan, Wisconsin politician
- Bud Selig, former 9th Commissioner of Baseball
- Milton Shadur (1924–2018), United States district judge
- Paul Sicula, lawyer and Member of the Wisconsin State Assembly
- Latrell Sprewell, former NBA basketball player
- Erwin G. Tamms, Wisconsin politician
- Fred W. Vetter Jr., U.S. Air Force general
- Wayne F. Whittow, Wisconsin politician
- Gene Wilder (1933–2016), actor, author, comedian, writer and filmmaker
