= Alexander Hamilton High School (Milwaukee) =

Public high school in Milwaukee, WI

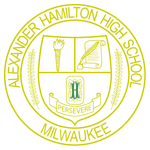

Location
- 6215 West Warnimont Avenue; Milwaukee, Wisconsin 53220; United States; 42°58′42″N 87°59′26″W

Information
- School type: Public High School
- Motto: "Wildcats are number one”
- Established: 1966
- School district: Milwaukee Public Schools
- Principal: Joe Ricciardi
- Staff: 95.48 (FTE)
- Grades: 9 through 12
- Enrollment: 1,485 (2023-2024)
- Student to teacher ratio: 15.55
- Colors: Green and Gold
- Mascot: Wildcat
- Newspaper: Esprit (defunct)
- Yearbook: The Diplomat
- Website: https://k12.mps.school/hamilton/

Alexander Hamilton High School (also known as Milwaukee Hamilton) is a public high school in Milwaukee, Wisconsin, on the city's far southwest side. Named after the first Secretary of the Treasury, Alexander Hamilton, the building was opened in February 1966, with about 450 second-semester sophomores from Pulaski High School. During the 2012–2013 school year enrollment was about 1700.

== Academics ==
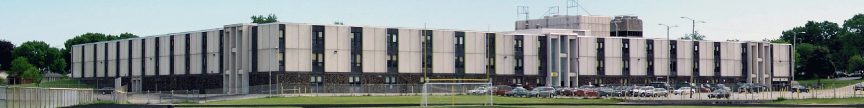
Hamilton High School

== Athletics ==
In athletics Hamilton competes at the Wisconsin Interscholastic Athletic Association Division I level as a member of the Milwaukee City Conference.

=== Athletic conference affiliation history ===
- Milwaukee City Conference (1966-1980)
- Milwaukee Area Conference (1980-1985)
- Big Nine Conference (1985-1993)
- Milwaukee City Conference (1993–present)

== Notable alumni ==
- Marvin Kimble, gymnast
- Kevon Looney (2014), basketball player
- Jessie Rodriguez, Wisconsin state representative
- Kevin Soucie, politician
- Gary Zauner, football coach
