= Harold S. Vincent High School =

Harold S. Vincent High School of Agricultural Science
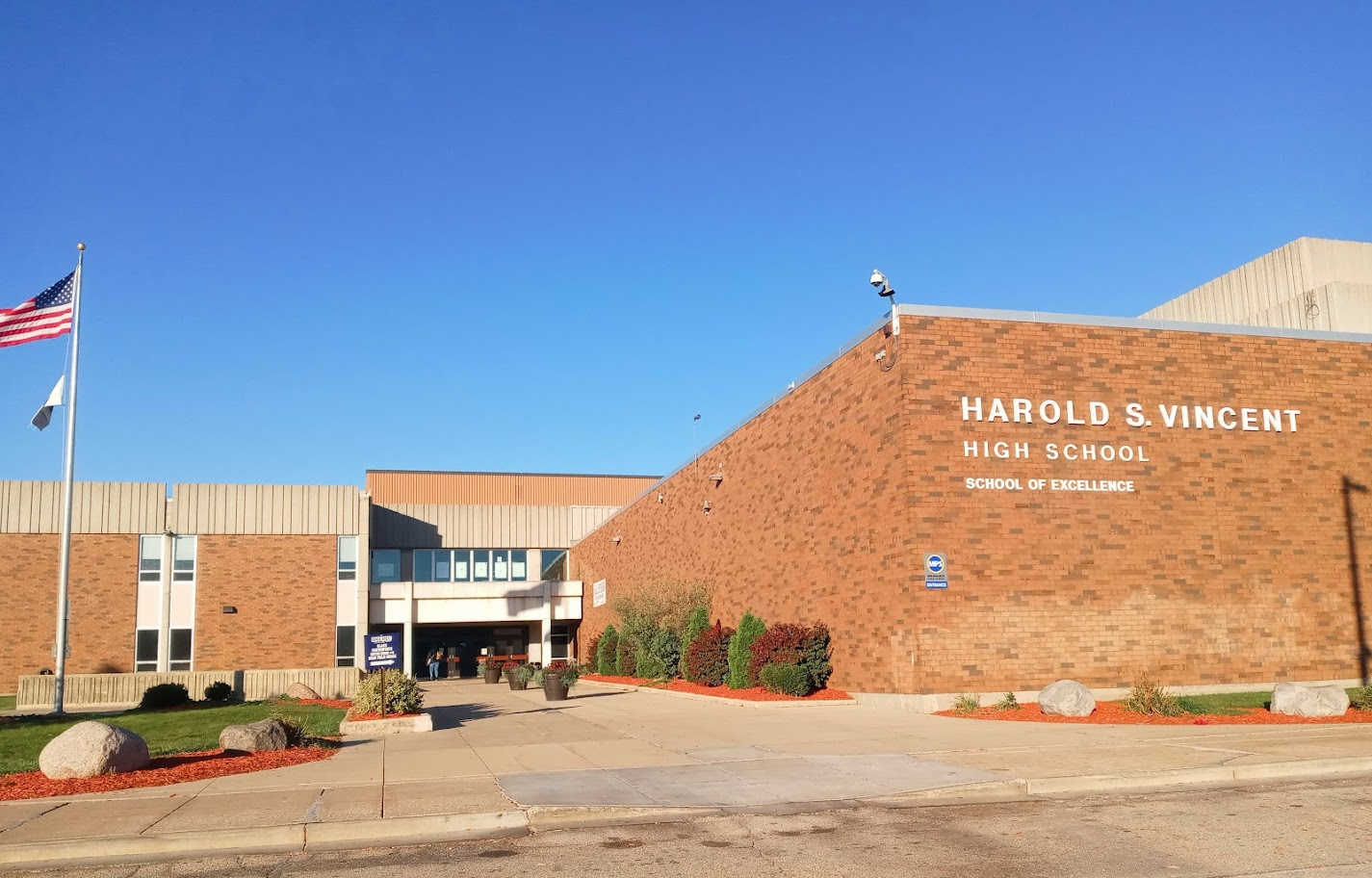

Location
- 7501 North Granville Road; Milwaukee, Wisconsin 53224; United States
- 43°9′16″N 88°1′52″W

Information
- Established: September 1979
- School district: Milwaukee Public Schools
- Superintendent: Dr. Brenda Cassellius, EdD
- Principal: Dr. Richard Watkins
- Teaching staff: 47.82 (FTE)
- Enrollment: 424 (2025-2026)
- Student to teacher ratio: 14.81
- Colors: Maroon and gold
- Athletics conference: Milwaukee City Conference
- Nickname: Vikings
- Rivals: Washington High School of Technology, Madison University High School
- Newspaper: The Viking Voice
- Yearbook: The Saga
- Website: School website

Harold S. Vincent High School of Agricultural Science, colloquially known as just Vincent, is a public high school located on 7501 North Granville Road in Milwaukee, Wisconsin. The school is part of the Milwaukee Public Schools.

Vincent's official student enrollment was 424 for the 2025-2026 school year. Vincent's student enrollment was 1,630 during the 2004–2005 school year. The school's varsity sports are: baseball, basketball, cheerleading, cross country, football, golf, soccer, softball, tennis, track & field, and volleyball.

The school is named for Harold S. Vincent, the Milwaukee School Superintendent from 1950-1967. Vincent High School was awarded a Blue Ribbon Presidential School of Excellence award in 1987 by The United States Department of Education.

It serves the community of Granville and the Calumet Farms Neighborhood in Milwaukee.

Harold S. Vincent High School of Agricultural Science is a one-of-a-kind learning community where urban education meets hands-on agricultural experience. The school is the only urban agriculture high school in the state of Wisconsin. The campus sits on 27 acres of working farmland.

The school's areas of study are: Agricultural Business & Entrepreneurship, Animal Science, Culinary Arts, Environmental Science, Food Science, and Horticulture.

== Demographics ==
As of July 9, 2026, Harold S. Vincent High School is:

- 60.8% African American
- 9.2% Caucasian/White
- 7.3% Asian/Pacific Islander
- 12.7% Hispanic
- 9.7% Two or More Races
- 0.2% American Indian/Alaska Native

Female 46% Male 54% Source:

== Athletics ==
Vincent's athletic teams are nicknamed the Vikings, and they have been affiliated with the Milwaukee City Conference for their entire history. Their traditional rivals are the Washington High School of Information Technology and James Madison High School.

The following sports are offered to students at Vincent:

- Baseball
- Basketball
- Cheerleading
- Cross Country
- Football
- Soccer
- Softball
- Track & Field
- Volleyball
- Wrestling

=== State championships ===
- Boys' track: 2001, 2003, 2005.
- Boys' basketball: 1996, 1997, 1998, 2000, 2001.
- Girls' basketball: 2007, 2008, 2009.

=== Athletic conference affiliation history ===
- Milwaukee City Conference (1979–present)

== Notable alumni ==
- Adrian Battles, Class of 2006, former NFL player
- Chuck Belin, Class of 1988, former NFL player
- Calvin Bellamy (Coo Coo Cal), Class of 1987, rap artist/songwriter
- Rodney Buford, Class of 1995, former NBA player
- Deonte Burton, Class of 2013, former NBA player
- Diante Garrett, Class of 2007, former NBA player, plays in the Israeli Basketball Premier League
- Danny Gokey, Class of 1998, singer/songwriter
- Carl Landry, Class of 2002, former NBA player
- Marcus Landry, Class of 2005, former NBA
- DeAndre Levy, Class of 2005, former NFL player
