= Robert A. Collins =

American politician

Robert A. Collins (November 4, 1924 in Milwaukee, Wisconsin – January 4, 2003) was a member of the Wisconsin State Assembly. He attended St. Anthony High School, Solomon Juneau Business High School, Lawrence University, Marquette University and Marquette University Law School. During World War II, Collins served in the United States Army. He is a member of the American Legion.

== Political career ==
Collins was elected to the Assembly in 1958. He was a Democrat.
