= Dan Turk =

American football player (1962–2000)

No. 51, 50, 67, 66
- Positions: Long snapper, center

Personal information
- Born: June 25, 1962; Milwaukee, Wisconsin, U.S.
- Died: December 23, 2000 (aged 38); Ashburn, Virginia, U.S.
- Listed height: 6 ft 4 in (1.93 m)
- Listed weight: 290 lb (132 kg)

Career information
- High school: James Madison (WI)
- College: Wisconsin
- NFL draft: 1985: 4th round, 101st overall pick

Career history
- Pittsburgh Steelers (1985–1986); Tampa Bay Buccaneers (1987–1988); Los Angeles/Oakland Raiders (1989–1996); Washington Redskins (1997–1999)

Awards and highlights
- Second-team All-Big Ten (1984)

Career NFL statistics
- Games played: 218
- Games started: 40
- Fumble recoveries: 3
- Stats at Pro Football Reference

Daniel Anthony Turk (June 25, 1962 – December 23, 2000) was an American professional football center and long snapper in the National Football League (NFL) for the Pittsburgh Steelers, Tampa Bay Buccaneers, Oakland Raiders, and Washington Redskins. He played college football at the University of Wisconsin–Madison.

== Early life ==
Turk attended James Madison High School. He accepted a football scholarship from Drake University. He transferred to the University of Wisconsin–Madison after his sophomore season.

As a junior, he started every game at center as part of an offensive line that also included future NFL players Jeff Dellenbach, Kevin Belcher and Bob Landsee. As a senior, he received UPI second-team All-Big Ten honors.

== Professional career ==
=== Pittsburgh Steelers ===
Turk was selected by the Pittsburgh Steelers in the fourth round (101st overall) of the 1985 NFL draft. He also was selected by the Jacksonville Bulls in the 1985 USFL Territorial Draft. As a rookie, he missed all but one game during the season with a broken right wrist.

In 1986, he started the season opener against the Seattle Seahawks in place of an injured Mike Webster, who had a streak of 150 consecutive games starts come to an end, while recovering from a dislocated elbow. He would also start the next 3 games in place of an injured Webster. On April 13, 1987, he was traded to the Tampa Bay Buccaneers in exchange for a sixth-round draft choice (#141-Tim Johnson).

=== Tampa Bay Buccaneers ===
In 1987, after the NFLPA strike was declared on the third week of the season, those contests were canceled (reducing the 16 game season to 15) and the NFL decided that the games would be played with replacement players. He crossed the picket line to be a part of the Buccaneer replacement team for the sixth game against the Minnesota Vikings. He was the only regular Buccaneer player to cross the picket line, that didn't need to receive treatment for injuries (3 other players had this situation). He had one start at center and 2 at guard during the season.

In 1988, he started 10 games at right guard. On June 6, 1989, he was declared a free agent, after the Buccaneers withdraw their contract offer.

=== Oakland Raiders ===
In June 1989, he signed as a free agent with the Los Angeles Raiders. He started 5 games at center.

In 1995, as a result of a training camp injury to Don Mosebar, Turk became the fourth starting center in Raider history. That year, he started all 16 games, between Steve Wisniewski at left guard and Kevin Gogan at right guard, for a team finishing with a won-lost record of 8-8, Mike White's first year as head coach.

=== Washington Redskins ===
On July 7, 1997, he signed as a free agent with the Washington Redskins to be the long snapper, becoming along with his brother Matt Turk, the first brother-to-brother snapper-punter combination in NFL history.

In 1999, in his final season with the Redskins and in the NFL, Turk botched several snaps during the regular season. During his last game, a divisional round contest of the 1999–2000 NFL playoffs against his former club, the Buccaneers, he dribbled the snap to holder Brad Johnson, that could have resulted in a game-winning 51-yard field goal. He was not re-signed after the season. It was later revealed that during these later games, he had been playing with a large, malignant tumor in his chest due to undiagnosed mediastinal germ cell tumors.

== Personal life ==
On December 23, 2000, Turk died from testicular cancer at age 38 after being diagnosed earlier that year in April. His brother is former NFL punter Matt Turk. His nephew Michael Turk was a punter for the Arizona State Sun Devils and the Oklahoma Sooners in college, and was signed by the Miami Dolphins in 2023 but was waived before the preseason.
