= Gary Zauner =

American football coach (born 1950)

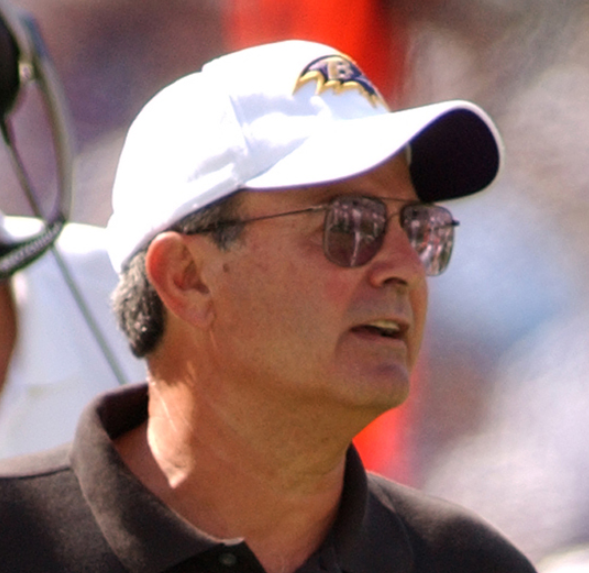
- Zauner with the Baltimore Ravens in 2003

Profile
- Positions: Placekicker, Punter

Personal information
- Born: November 2, 1950 (age 76); Milwaukee, Wisconsin

Career information
- High school: Milwaukee (WI) Hamilton
- College: Wisconsin–La Crosse

Career history
- Brigham Young (1979–1980) Special teams coordinator; San Diego State (1981–1985) Special teams coordinator; New Mexico (1987–1988) Special teams coordinator; Long Beach State (1990–1991) Special teams coordinator; Minnesota Vikings (1994–2001) Special teams coordinator; Baltimore Ravens (2002–2005) Special teams coordinator; Arizona Cardinals (2006) Special teams coordinator; California Redwoods (2009) Special teams coordinator; As kicking consultant: Philadelphia Eagles (1980); Cleveland Browns (1988); San Diego Chargers (1991); San Francisco 49ers (1991); Chicago Bears (1992); Kansas City Chiefs (1992); Seattle Seahawks (1993); New York Giants (1993)

Gary Zauner (born November 2, 1950) is an American football coach. He coached 13 seasons in the National Football League (NFL) with the Minnesota Vikings, Baltimore Ravens and Arizona Cardinals. He has coached kickers for over 35 years in high school, college and the NFL. Further, he was a successful college kicker playing for the University of Wisconsin–La Crosse.

Zauner also operates a kicking consulting service located in Fountain Hills, Arizona.

== Playing career ==
Zauner was a four-year letterman in football and baseball at University of Wisconsin–La Crosse (1968–72). He went to training camp as a punter with the Minnesota Vikings in 1973 and the Houston Oilers in 1974.

== Coaching career ==
=== College ===
==== Brigham Young ====
Zauner began his coaching career in 1979 at Brigham Young University under Head Coach LaVell Edwards. He became the first full-time special teams coach in the NCAA. At BYU he recruited punter/kicker Lee Johnson, a future fifth-round draft choice by the Houston Oilers in 1985.

==== San Diego State ====
He then moved to coach special teams at San Diego State for five Seasons (1981–85) turning the Aztecs into one of the best special teams units in the nation. At SDSU, he helped to recruit current Redwoods defensive assistant coach and longtime NFL safety Robert Griffith.

==== New Mexico ====
Zauner spent the following three seasons (1987–89) at the University of New Mexico where he coached former NFL wide receiver Terance Mathis, who tied an NCAA season record (1989) for three touchdown's on kickoff returns.

==== Long Bech State ====
In 1990, Zauner was hired by George Allen to coach at Long Beach State for two seasons (1990–91).

=== National Football League ===
From 1980 to 1993, Zauner worked as a kicking consultant for the Philadelphia Eagles, Cleveland Browns, San Diego Chargers, San Francisco 49ers, Chicago Bears, Kansas City Chiefs, Seattle Seahawks, and New York Giants.

==== Minnesota Vikings ====
In 1994, Zauner was hired by the Minnesota Vikings to be their special teams coordinator under head coach Dennis Green.

==== Baltimore Ravens ====
In 2002, Zauner was hired by the Baltimore Ravens to be their special teams coordinator under head coach Brian Billick.

==== Arizona Cardinals ====
In 2006, Zauner was hired by the Arizona Cardinals to be their special teams coordinator, rejoining Dennis Green.

=== Post-NFL career ===
In 2009, Zauner would join Dennis Green on the California Redwoods of the United Football League (UFL) as their special teams coordinator.

After leaving the Redwoods, Zauner began a career as a private kicking coach and opened a kicking consulting service based in Fountain Hills, Arizona, where he hosts an annual kicking combine for kickers that are hoping to get drafted or signed by a professional team. He has worked with kickers such as Brandon Aubrey, Donald De La Haye, and Matt Gay.

== Personal life ==
Zauner attended Hamilton High School. He earned bachelor's and master's degrees in physical education from University of Wisconsin–La Crosse.
