= Mark Maddox =

American football player (born 1968)

No. 55, 53
- Position: Linebacker

Personal information
- Born: March 23, 1968 (age 58); Milwaukee, Wisconsin, U.S.
- Listed height: 6 ft 1 in (1.85 m)
- Listed weight: 240 lb (109 kg)

Career information
- High school: James Madison (Milwaukee)
- College: Northern Michigan
- NFL draft: 1991: 9th round, 249th overall pick

Career history
- Buffalo Bills (1991–1997); Arizona Cardinals (1998–2000)

Career NFL statistics
- Tackles: 355
- Fumble recoveries: 5
- Sacks: 2.5
- Stats at Pro Football Reference

Mark Anthony Maddox (born March 23, 1968) is an American former professional football player who was a linebacker for 10 seasons in the National Football League (NFL) for the Buffalo Bills and Arizona Cardinals. He was selected 249th overall in the ninth round of the 1991 NFL draft by the Bills. He played college football for the Northern Michigan Wildcats.

He attended James Madison High School and then Northern Michigan University.
