= Martin E. Schreiber =

American politician

Martin E. Schreiber (November 11, 1904 – January 29, 1997) was a carpenter, real estate agent and Republican politician from Milwaukee who served one term as a member of the Wisconsin State Assembly and 32 years as an alderman of the City of Milwaukee (1944–1976). He was the father of Martin J. Schreiber, later to become a Democratic Governor of Wisconsin.

== Background ==
Schreiber was born in Budsin in Marquette County, Wisconsin. After attending a Lutheran parochial school, he attended North Division high school and Boys Trade and Technical High School, as well at the University of Wisconsin–Extension Center in Milwaukee (later to become part of UW-Milwaukee). He worked as a carpenter and a carpenter foreman, then became a real estate agent, a property manager, and an appraiser for and director of a savings and loan association.

== Running for the Assembly ==
In 1940, after losing a race for alderman, he challenged Socialist incumbent Assembly member Arthur Koegel in the seventh Milwaukee County Assembly district (7th ward of the City of Milwaukee); Schreiber won a four-way Republican primary, but Koegel won the general election with 4248 votes, to 3973 for Schreiber and 1828 for Democrat Clarence Findley.

In 1942, he faced Koegel once more and won, with 2696 votes to 1652 for Progressive Walter Ensslin and only 818 for Koegel. He was assigned to the standing committee on State Affairs.

In 1944, Schreiber defeated veteran Socialist Alex C. Ruffing in the spring municipal election for alderman, and did not seek re-election to the Assembly, although he did serve out his term after being sworn in as alderman. He would remain on the Common Council until 1976. His seat in the Assembly was taken by fellow Republican Clyde Follansbee.
