= Robert R. Heider =

American lawyer and politician

Robert Ray Heider (April 13, 1928 – January 15, 2015) was an American lawyer and politician.

Born in Moline, Illinois, Heider graduated from Bay View High School in the Bay View neighborhood of Milwaukee, Wisconsin. He went to what is now Michigan Technological University and University of Minnesota. He then received his bachelor's degree from University of Wisconsin and his law degree from University of Wisconsin Law School. Heider then practiced law and lived in Elm Grove, Wisconsin. During World War II, he served in the United States Army, and was a Japanese linguist at the General Headquarters in Tokyo after the war. He was a special agent with the Counterintelligence Corps during the Korean War. Heider served in the Wisconsin State Assembly in 1957 and was a Republican. Heider died in West Allis, Wisconsin on January 15, 2015.
