= Patrick Eddie =

American basketball player

Personal information
- Born: December 27, 1967 (age 58) Milwaukee, Wisconsin, U.S.
- Listed height: 6 ft 11 in (2.11 m)
- Listed weight: 240 lb (109 kg)

Career information
- High school: Milwaukee Trade and Technical (Milwaukee, Wisconsin)
- College: Arkansas State (1987–1989); Ole Miss (1989–1991)
- NBA draft: 1991: undrafted
- Position: Center
- Number: 41

Career history
- 1991: New York Knicks
- Stats at NBA.com
- Stats at Basketball Reference

Patrick Eddie is an American former basketball player who played center in the National Basketball Association for the New York Knicks during the 1991–92 NBA season. He was the head coach of the Heritage Christian High School Varsity basketball team in 2012–13 and 2013–14. Eddie played college basketball for Arkansas State and Ole Miss.
