= Adrian Battles =

American football player (born 1988)

Profile
- Position: Offensive guard

Personal information
- Born: October 30, 1986 (age 40)
- Listed height: 6 ft 4 in (1.93 m)
- Listed weight: 300 lb (136 kg)

Career information
- High school: Milwaukee (WI) Vincent
- College: Minnesota State

Career history
- Minnesota Vikings (2010)*; Green Bay Packers (2010–2011)*; Green Bay Blizzard (2014); Cleveland Gladiators (2015–2016)
- * Offseason or practice squad member only

Awards and highlights
- Super Bowl champion (XLV)
- Stats at Pro Football Reference
- Stats at ArenaFan.com

Adrian Battles (born October 30, 1988) is a retired American football offensive guard. He played college football for Minnesota State University, Mankato from 2005 to 2009.

== College career ==
Battles played college football from 2005 to 2009 as an offensive tackle for the Minnesota State Mavericks. He was a four-year starter at Mankato, starting in 43 of 46 games while with the program. According to Mark Craig of the Minneapolis Star-Tribune, Battles "dominated the NCAA Division II ranks" as an offensive lineman for MNSU. Battles credited offensive line coach Mike Cunningham for treating him like a son and keeping him motivated through four years at MNSU.

== Professional career ==
=== Minnesota Vikings ===
In May 2010, Battles signed as a free agent to play professional football with the Minnesota Vikings. He was moved by the Vikings from an offensive tackle to an offensive guard. He told reporters that the position change presented a challenge due to the differences in footwork and technique, but added, "When I get an opportunity, I have to make the most of it." Before playing in his first pre-season game in August 2010, Battles told a reporter, "I haven't even been to an NFL game. To actually play in the first NFL game I go to is awesome. I'm looking forward to it." After completing the entire NFL preseason with the Vikings, Battles was released on September 5, 2010.

=== Green Bay Packers ===
In December 2010, he signed with the Green Bay Packers of the National Football League. He was a member of the Packers practice squad and became "an unofficial good-luck charm" for the Packers who went 7-0 after he joined the team (two regular season games and five postseason games) to become the first No. 6 seed from the NFC to play in the Super Bowl.

Battles was part of the Packers' practice squad at Super Bowl XLV. With the team in Irving, Texas, Battles told a reporter for the Milwaukee Journal Sentinel, "I was a Packer fan growing up. Just to be a part of this organization is great -- especially to be a part of the Super Bowl experience. A lot of guys don't get to experience this, even guys who have long careers. It's a blessing to be here and I'm thankful for it."

At the media day before Super Bowl XLV, Battles showed up wearing a giant "cheesehead." Photographs of the grinning, 6 foot, 3 inch, 315 pound cheesehead were published in multiple newspapers including a featured picture of the day in the United Kingdom's The Daily Telegraph. Battles told reporters, "I'm enjoying every minute of it."

In August 2011, he joined the Packers for their visit to the White House after winning Super Bowl XLV and was prominently featured in photographs as he stood behind President Barack Obama. When his photograph was printed in newspapers across the country, friends of Battles joked that he "must have sneaked in there." Asked about his prominent placement, Battles told the Milwaukee Journal Sentinel, "I just call myself lucky for getting that spot. We went down in rows and I ended up right there in the front."

On July 31, 2011, the second day of the Packers' 2011 training camp, Battles suffered an injury to his Achilles tendon. He was unable to return to the team after the injury and was waived/injured on August 30, 2011. After clearing waivers, he was placed on injured reserve and released with an injury settlement on September 2.

=== Green Bay Blizzard ===
Battles played for the Green Bay Blizzard of the Indoor Football League in 2014.

=== Cleveland Gladiators ===
Battles started the final game of the 2015 season for the Cleveland Gladiators.
