= Fred Rehm =

American basketball player

Personal information
- Born: May 18, 1921
- Died: December 28, 2012 (aged 91)
- Listed height: 6 ft 2 in (1.88 m)

Career information
- High school: Pulaski (Milwaukee, Wisconsin)
- College: Wisconsin (1940–1943)
- Position: Guard

Career history
- 1945: Oshkosh All-Stars
- 1947–1948: Flint Dow A.C.s
- 1948: Oshkosh All-Stars

Career highlights
- NCAA champion (1941)

Frederick R. Rehm (May 18, 1921 – December 28, 2012) was an American basketball player. He was an early professional player in the National Basketball League (which later merged with the Basketball Association of America to form the National Basketball Association) and was a starter on the University of Wisconsin's 1941 national championship team.

Rehm, a 6'2" guard from Pulaski High School in Milwaukee, Wisconsin, played college basketball at Wisconsin for future Hall of Fame coach Bud Foster. Rehm played from 1940 to 1943 and, as a sophomore, was a starting guard for the Badgers' 1941 national championship team. One of the turning points in the season was Foster's decision to insert Rehm into the starting lineup for his defense and rebounding, in place of Bob Alwin.

After the completion of his college career, Rehm played in the National Basketball League for the Oshkosh All-Stars and the Flint Dow A.C.s.
