= Big Nine Conference (Wisconsin) =

Wisconsin high school athletic conference (1985-1993)

The Big Nine Conference is a former high school athletic conference in Wisconsin, operating from 1985 to 1993 and consisting of nine large high schools in southeastern Wisconsin.

== History ==
Location of Big Nine Conference Members

The Big Nine Conference was formed in the aftermath of extensive athletic conference realignment in southeastern Wisconsin following the 1984-85 school year. It was one of three new conferences created that year, along with the North Shore and Suburban Park conferences. This alignment placed the Racine and Kenosha high schools back together in a similar alignment to the old South Shore Conference, but with the addition of four high schools on the south side of Milwaukee. The Milwaukee schools were not in favor of this alignment, going to the length of filing a lawsuit against the WIAA to rejoin the Milwaukee City Conference. This finally happened in 1993, and the Big Nine Conference was disbanded along with the Braveland and Suburban Park Conferences. The five high schools in Racine and Kenosha went on to form the South Division of the new fifteen-member Southeast Conference.

== Conference membership history ==
School	Location	Affiliation	Mascot	Colors	Joined	Left	Conference Joined	Current Conference
Kenosha Bradford	Kenosha, WI	Public	Red Devils		1985	1993	Southeast	
Kenosha Tremper	Kenosha, WI	Public	Trojans		1985	1993	Southeast	
Milwaukee Bay View	Milwaukee, WI	Public	Redcats		1985	1993	Milwaukee City	
Milwaukee Hamilton	Milwaukee, WI	Public	Wildcats		1985	1993	Milwaukee City	
Milwaukee Pulaski	Milwaukee, WI	Public	Rams		1985	1993	Milwaukee City	
Milwaukee South Division	Milwaukee, WI	Public	Cardinals		1985	1993	Milwaukee City	
Racine Case	Racine, WI	Public	Eagles		1985	1993	Southeast	
Racine Horlick	Racine, WI	Public	Rebels		1985	1993	Southeast	
Racine Park	Racine, WI	Public	Panthers		1985	1993	Southeast	

== List of state champions ==
=== Fall sports ===
Boys Cross Country
School	Year	Division
Racine Case	1989	Class A

Football
School	Year	Division
Racine Park	1988	Division 1
Kenosha Tremper	1991	Division 1

Girls Golf
School	Year	Division
Racine Case	1988	Single Division

Girls Volleyball
School	Year	Division
Racine Horlick	1990	Division 1

=== Winter sports ===
None

=== Spring sports ===
Baseball
School	Year	Division
Racine Park	1993	Division 1

Boys Track & Field
School	Year	Division
Milwaukee South Division	1986	Class A
Milwaukee South Division	1987	Class A
Milwaukee South Division	1988	Class A
Milwaukee South Division	1989	Class A

Girls Track & Field
School	Year	Division
Racine Horlick	1987	Class A
Racine Horlick	1988	Class A

== List of conference champions ==
=== Boys Basketball ===
School	Quantity	Years
Racine Horlick	5	1986. 1988, 1989, 1991, 1993
Kenosha Tremper	2	1992, 1993
Milwaukee Bay View	2	1990, 1993
Racine Case	1	1987
Racine Park	1	1991
Kenosha Bradford	0	
Milwaukee Hamilton	0	
Milwaukee Pulaski	0	
Milwaukee South Division	0	

=== Girls Basketball ===
School	Quantity	Years
Racine Horlick	6	1986, 1987, 1988, 1989, 1990, 1991
Racine Case	4	1988, 1991, 1992, 1993
Racine Park	3	1989, 1990, 1991
Kenosha Bradford	0	
Kenosha Tremper	0	
Milwaukee Bay View	0	
Milwaukee Hamilton	0	
Milwaukee Pulaski	0	
Milwaukee South Division	0	

=== Football ===
School	Quantity	Years
Racine Park	5	1985, 1986, 1988, 1989, 1992
Kenosha Tremper	2	1990, 1991
Racine Case	2	1986, 1987
Kenosha Bradford	1	1987
Milwaukee Bay View	0	
Milwaukee Hamilton	0	
Milwaukee Pulaski	0	
Milwaukee South Division	0	
Racine Horlick	0	
