= North Division High School (Milwaukee) =

School in Wisconsin, United States

Coordinates: 43°04′00.4″N 87°55′29.9″W

North Division High School (now North Division Virtual University High School) is one of the major public high schools in Milwaukee, Wisconsin, part of the Milwaukee Public Schools. It began operation in 1906, was abolished in 2006, and was reinstituted in 2011.

== Flourishing years ==
By 1915, it had the highest enrollment of any high school in Milwaukee, at 1082, even though it had just lost almost 200 students to the newly opened Riverside High School.

== "Save North Division" drive ==
After a $20 million renovation program (the new building, just to the east of the old site, opened in September 1978) failed to lure white students to North Division, the school board voted to turn the school into a magnet school specializing in medical and science technology. A "Coalition to Save North Division" was formed, arguing that this school which had produced many African-American leaders for Milwaukee was being abolished, displacing black students and continuing a process of placing the burden of desegregation on them (at the time, the student body was 96.6% black). The Coalition eventually won: on May 1, 1980, the school board reversed itself, and North Division remained heavily African-American in composition.

== Abolition ==
North Division was abolished, and its old campus divided into three smaller charter schools, in 2004. In 2009 the Milwaukee School Board voted to return to a single, large, comprehensive high school in the old building and under the old name, effective in September 2010. In Fall of 2011, it was announced that it was back in operation as North Division Virtual University High School, with "[n]ew classes, teachers and administrative staff for the 2011 - 2012 school year!".

== Athletics ==
NDHS won state championships in boys' cross country in 1958 and 1960.

=== Athletic conference affiliation history ===
- Milwaukee City Conference (1906-1980)
- Milwaukee Area Conference (1980-1985)
- Milwaukee City Conference (1985-present)

== Notable alumni ==
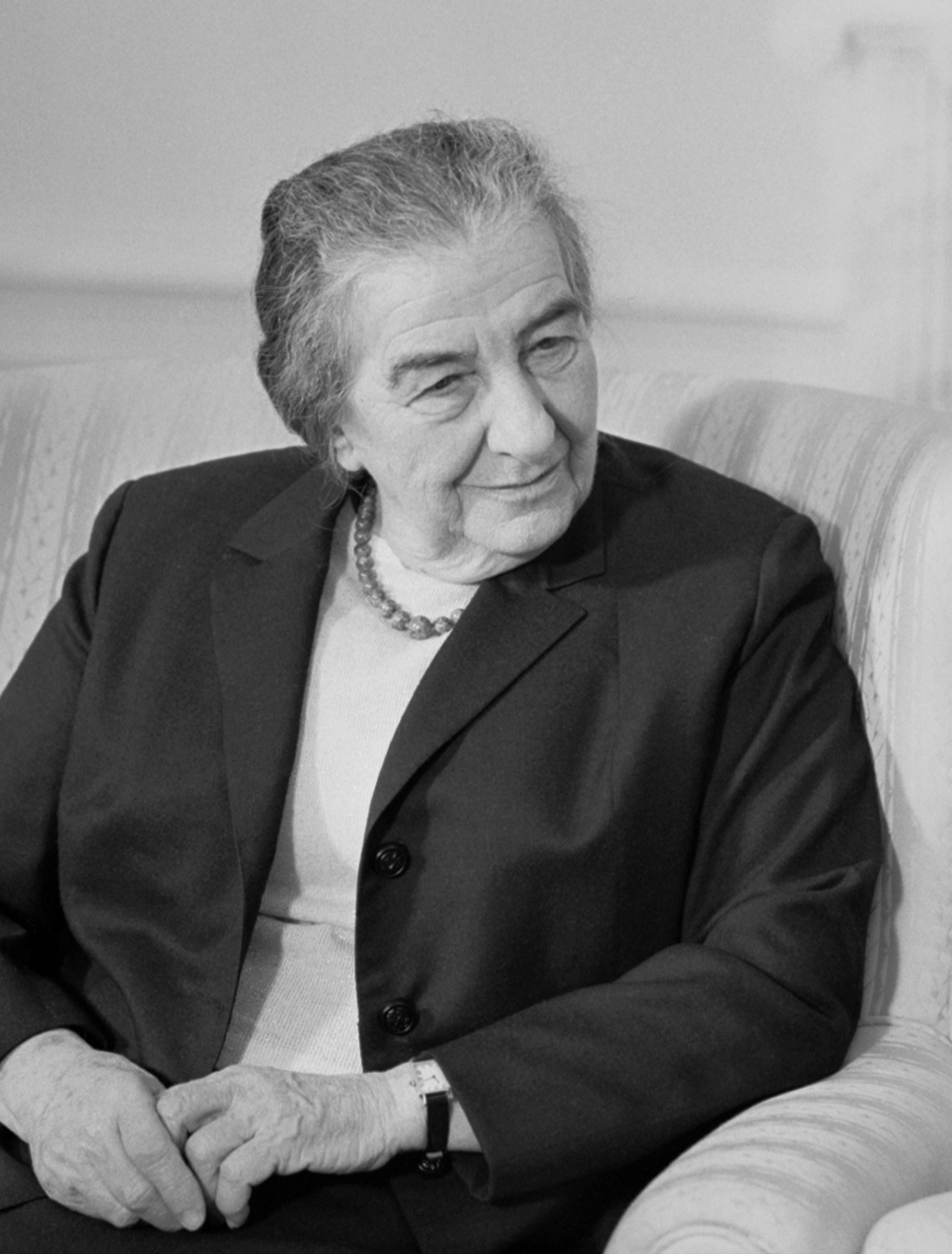
Golda Meir

- Rudolph Beyer, glassblower and Socialist state senator
- Gil Brandt, Vice President of player personnel for the Dallas Cowboys from 1960 to 1988
- Angna Enters, artist and performer
- Frank Glazer, pianist and composer
- Frank Gatson Jr., Director/Choreographer
- Lowell C. Kilday, United States diplomat
- Oscar Koch, U.S. Army brigadier general
- Golda Meir, Prime Minister of Israel
- Gwen Moore, Congresswoman
- Vel Phillips, pioneering African-American politician
- Dave Quabius, basketball player
- Philip D. Reed, president and CEO of GE
- Harvey Scales, R&B musician
- Martin E. Schreiber, State Representative and Milwaukee alderman
- Glenn P. Turner, lawyer and Socialist state representative
- Rabbi Abraham J. Twerski
- Annette Polly Williams, state representative
