= Lynde & Harry Bradley Technology and Trade School =

Coordinates: 43°01′26.7″N 87°54′53.0″W

Lynde & Harry Bradley Technology & Trade High School
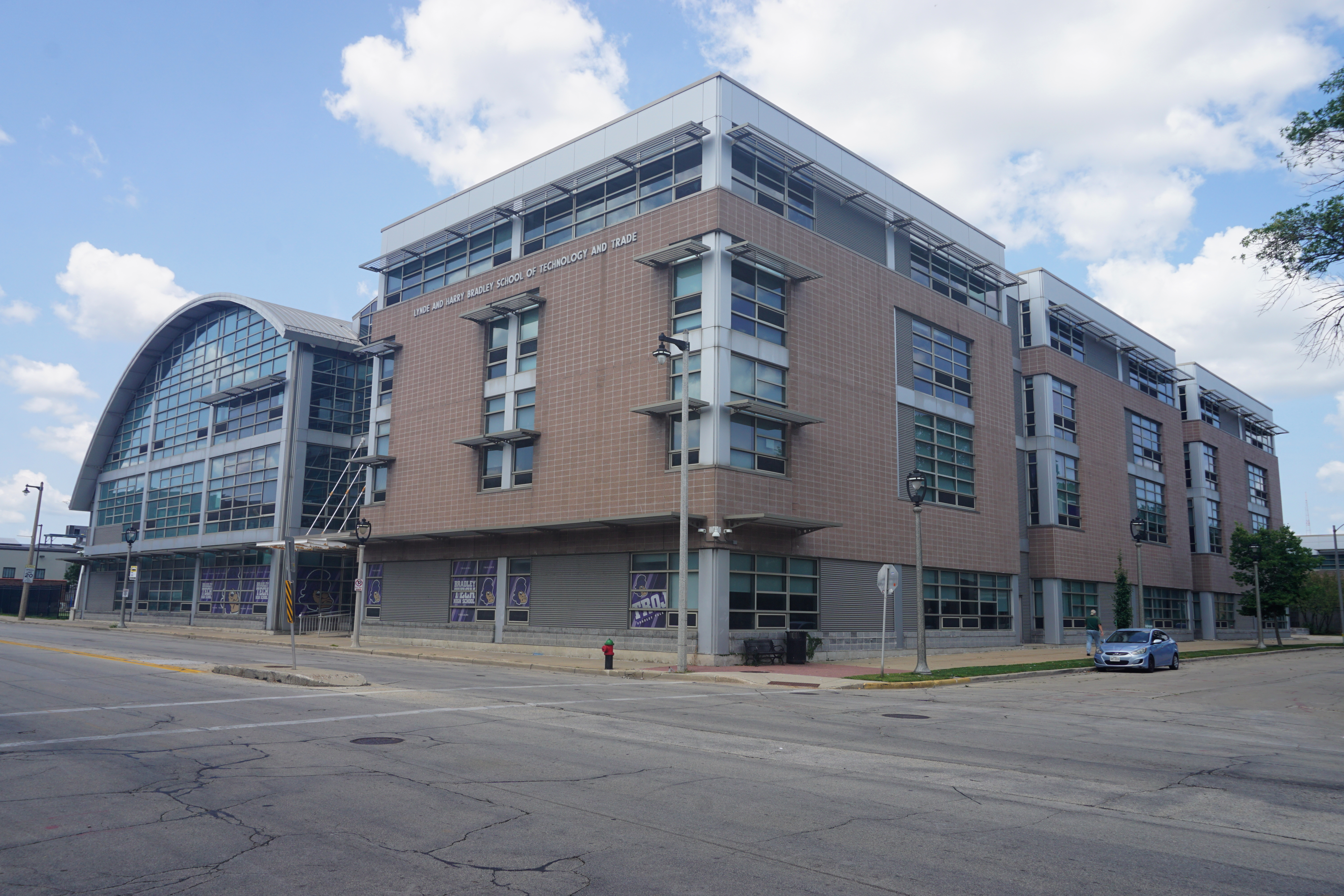

Location
- 700 South 4th Street; Milwaukee, Wisconsin 53204; United States

Information
- School type: Public secondary (magnet)
- Established: 1906
- School district: Milwaukee Public Schools
- Superintendent: Keith P. Posley
- Principal: Jineen McLemore-Torres
- Teaching staff: 54.50 (FTE)
- Grades: 9–12
- Enrollment: 1,002 (2017-18)
- Student to teacher ratio: 18.39
- Campus: Urban Area
- Colour: Purple/White
- Athletics conference: City Conference
- Mascot: The Trojan
- Nickname: The Trojans
- Website: Bradley Tech Homepage

The Lynde and Harry Bradley Technology and Trade School (also known as Bradley Tech) is a high school in Milwaukee, Wisconsin, United States. Located in the Walker's Point neighborhood, Bradley Tech is the primary high school for technology and trade education in the Milwaukee Public Schools. The school offers a range of scholastic options, including college preparatory, tech/trade education, and apprenticeships.

Bradley Tech has three "Academies of Learning", each of which specialize in a different area of technology or trade: Manufacturing; Architecture/Construction; and Design. Bradley Tech also offers extracurricular activities.

== History ==
=== Boys Technical High School ===
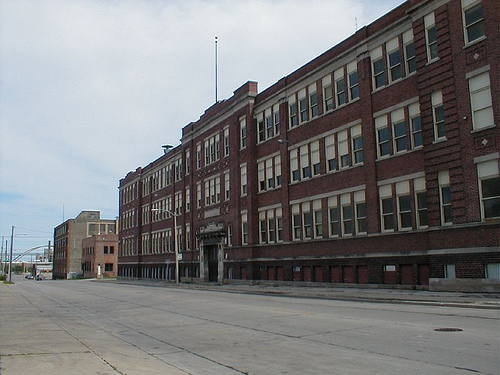
Milwaukee Boys Tech High School

The school was founded in 1906 as Boys Trade and Technical High School. On July 1, 1907, Tech became part of the Milwaukee public school system. Boys Tech was at one time the largest high school in Wisconsin, with an enrollment of 2900 pupils.

=== Milwaukee Trade and Technical High School ===
In 1975, Boys Technical High School changed its name to "Milwaukee Trade and Technical High School", to recognize that girls could now enroll in the school.

=== Lynde and Harry Bradley Technology and Trade School ===
In 2002, the school's name was changed to Lynde and Harry Bradley Technology and Trade School following a donation by Jane Pettit, widow of Lloyd Pettit. Renovations to the school, including a new main building directly south of the old building, were completed in 2002 and in 2006, the original Boys Technical High School building was removed. The area was converted to an athletic field.

== Academics ==
Bradley Tech has three "Academies of Learning", each of which specialize in a different area of technology or trade: Manufacturing; Architecture/Construction; and Design. Honors Level and Advanced Placement (AP) courses are also offered. Students who attend Bradley Tech have the support of local pre-college programs such as Diversity Scholars, My Life! My Plan!, Lead to Succeed, and Upward Bound.

=== Manufacturing ===
Bradley Tech's manufacturing program includes courses in computer-integrated manufacturing, molding and casting processes, welding, metal fabrication, CNC processes and rapid prototyping in cutting edge labs. A wide array of Project Lead the Way courses are also offered to students.

=== Architecture/Construction ===
Students learn current construction processes, architectural design, green building techniques, problem solving, and explore other creative mediums through visits from professional partners, job shadowing, and real world, hands-on projects.

=== Design ===
The design pathway at Bradley Tech offers courses in multimedia (graphic design, animation, audio, and video editing), desktop publishing (image editing, digital photography, page layout), and web design and programming.

== Extracurricular activities ==
=== Clubs ===
Ambassadors - Student Government, Chess Club, Forensics/Debate, Men to Men, National Honor Society, Robotics, Senior Council, Slam Poetry Club, Women to Women, Motorcycle Build Club, and esports.

=== Athletics ===
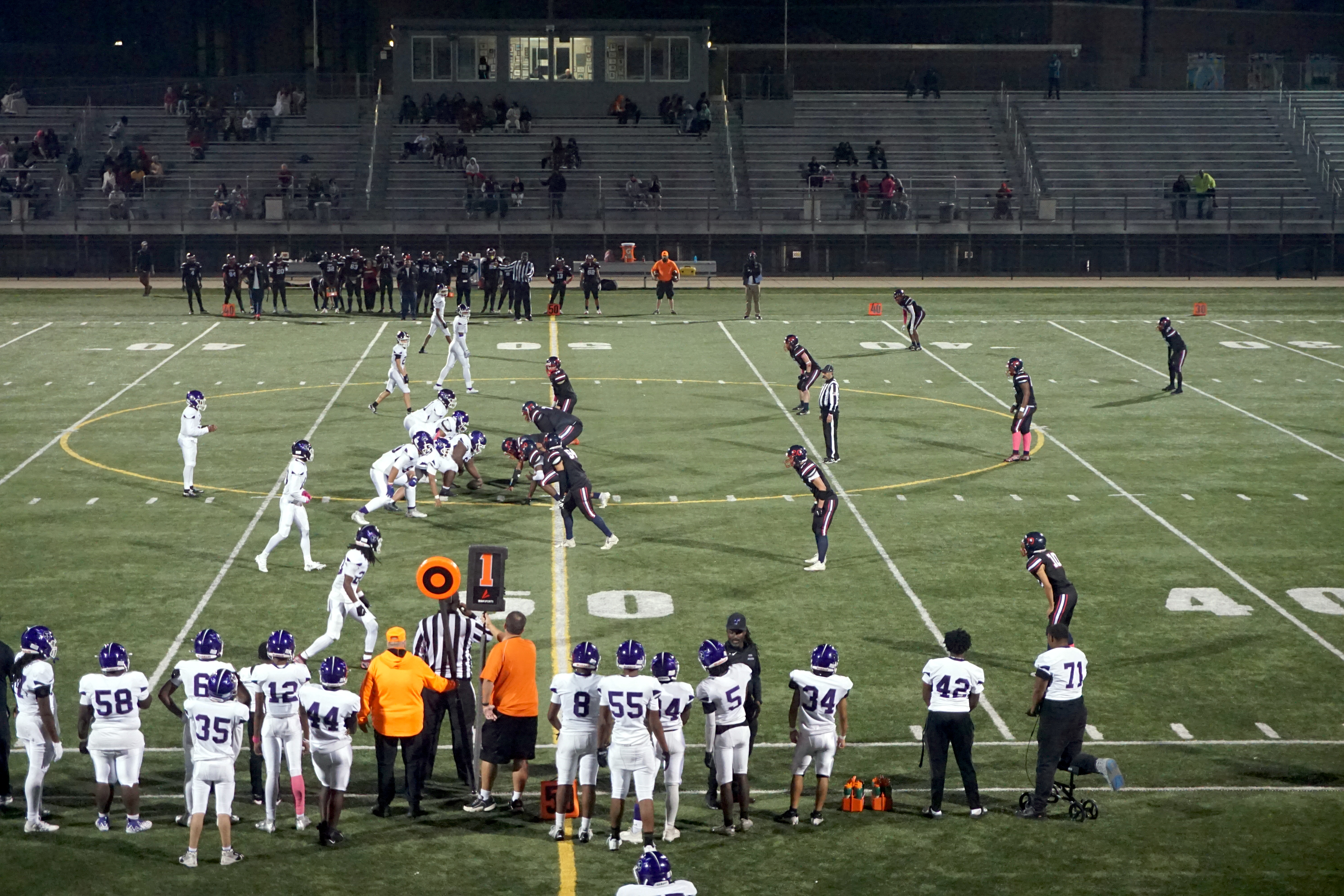
Bradley Tech playing football against Pulaski in 2025

Bradley Tech High School offers 15 varsity and junior varsity teams. All participate in the Milwaukee City Conference and WIAA Division I. Bradley Tech's traditional rivals are the Bay View High School Red Cats.

Fall sports include cheerleading, co-ed cross-country, dance teams, football, boys soccer, girls tennis, and girls volleyball. In 1986, Tech became the first City Conference school to play for the WIAA Division 1 football championship, losing the title game to two-time defending champion Manitowoc 28–20.

Winter sports include boys' basketball, girls' basketball, cheerleading, dance team, co-ed swimming, and wrestling. The boys' basketball program has produced two state championships, in 1979 and 1983. The boys' swim team dominated the Milwaukee City Conference, winning 24 times in 25 years ending with the 1989 school year - the swim team won again in 1992 and 1995.

Spring sports include baseball, girls' soccer, softball, boys' tennis, co-ed track and field. The boys' baseball program earned a state tournament berth in 10 consecutive years from 1980 to 1990, winning the state championship in 1985. The boys' baseball team won the Milwaukee City Conference championship two years in a row from 2009 to 2010 and also won the City Conference Championship in 2018.

==== Athletic conference affiliation history ====
- Milwaukee City Conference (1906-1980)
- Milwaukee Area Conference (1980-1985)
- Milwaukee City Conference (1985-present)

== Alumni ==
- Louis Bashell, polka musician
- Eric Benet, recording artist
- Michael Bennett, NFL running back
- David Bowen, state representative
- Keombani Coleman, NFL linebacker
- Ron Drzewiecki, NFL running back
- Patrick Eddie, NBA center
- Frank Gorenc, United States Air Force Four-Star General
- James T. Harris radio talk show host
- Ken Keltner, MLB third baseman
- Walter Kunicki, 71st Speaker of the Wisconsin State Assembly
- Chet Laabs, MLB outfielder
- Jerry Ordway, comic book artist and writer
- Elliott Payne, Minneapolis City Council Member
- Martin E. Schreiber, State Representative and Milwaukee Alderman
- Wilfred Schuele, State Representative and Senator
- Ken Skowronski, State Representative
- Amaiya Spain, rapper known professionally as Myaap
- Bob Uecker, MLB catcher, sportscaster
