= Ronald Wilson Reagan College Preparatory High School =

High school in Wisconsin, United States

Coordinates: 42.953785°N 87.940062°W

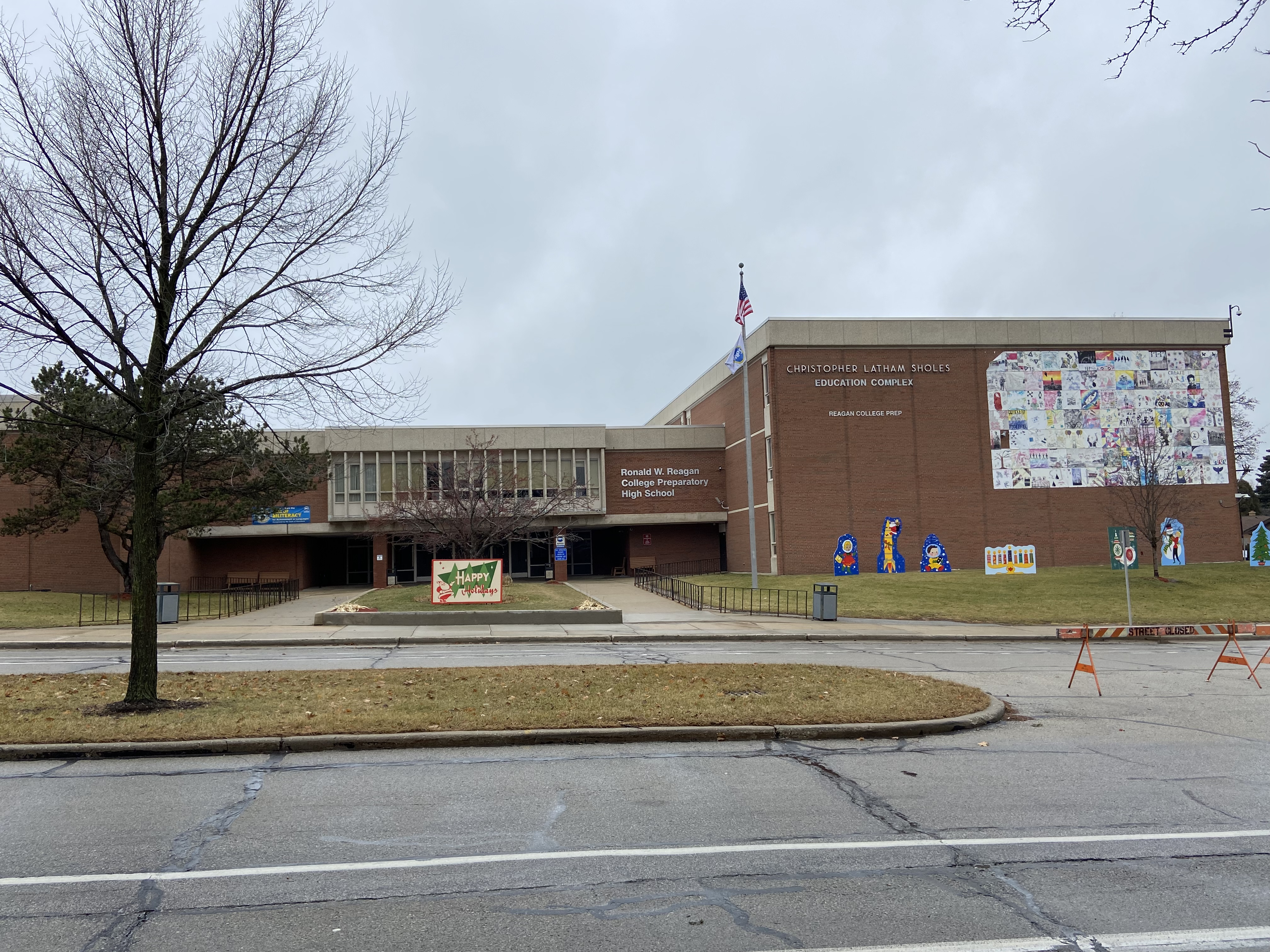

Location
- 4965 S 20th St; Milwaukee, Wisconsin; United States

Information
- School type: Public High school
- Motto: One mission, one vision, one focus: IB
- Established: 2003
- School district: Milwaukee Public Schools
- Superintendent: Keith P. Posley
- Principal: Misa Sato
- Grades: 9 through 12
- Enrollment: 1,349 (2023-2024)
- Campus size: 13.118 Acres
- Color
- Mascot: Husky
- Website: www.ronaldreaganhs.org

Ronald Wilson Reagan College Preparatory High School (RRHS) is a high school located at 4965 South 20th Street in the Town of Lake neighborhood of Milwaukee, Wisconsin, USA. It is a part of Milwaukee Public Schools (MPS).

Formerly known as Town of Lake College Preparatory High School, the school changed its name following the death of former President Ronald Reagan in June 2004. The renaming was approved by the Milwaukee Board of School Directors on September 29, 2004, with the official renaming ceremony taking place on June 3, 2005. Ronald Wilson Reagan College Preparatory High School became an International Baccalaureate (IB) World School. Reagan has an alternating day schedule. The system is known as an A Day and B day system to the students.

== History ==
Around 2004 it had 100 students. By 2010 it had 1,000 students, and so many students applied for admission that the school had a wait list. In the year of 2022, MPS breaks ground on multi-million dollar expansion at Reagan that would be split into three phases the first phase of the project is being funded by $9 million in federal emergency relief funds to help schools move forward from the pandemic. The first phase is also funded by private donors and other fundraising efforts.

== Athletics ==
Reagan Prep's athletic teams are called the Huskies, and they have been members of the Milwaukee City Conference since 2007.

== Notable alumni ==
- Alec Marsh, current pitcher for the Kansas City Royals
- Darrin Madison, politician
