= Casimir Pulaski High School =

High school in Wisconsin, United States

Coordinates: 42.989369°N 87.945862°W

Location
- 2500 West Oklahoma Avenue; Milwaukee, (Milwaukee County), Wisconsin 53215; United States

Information
- Type: Public high school
- Principal: Jason O'Brien
- Staff: 63.00 (FTE)
- Enrollment: 945 (2023-2024)
- Student to teacher ratio: 15.00
- Colors: Crimson and navy
- Fight song: "All Hail Pulaski"
- Athletics conference: Milwaukee City (Richardson)
- Nickname: Rams
- Website: https://mps.school/pulaski/

Casimir Pulaski High School is a public high school located on 2500 W Oklahoma Ave in Milwaukee, Wisconsin. Casimir Pulaski is part of the Milwaukee Public School system. The school had 1600 students during the 2004–2005 school year.

Pulaski is a large high school located on Milwaukee's south side. The school combines with Milwaukee High School of the Arts and Carmen Southeast High School to create several sports teams including football, basketball, baseball, swimming, wrestling, cross country and track and field.

== Namesake ==
It is named after Casimir Pulaski, a Polish nobleman who came to fight in the Continental Army during the American Revolutionary War. He is credited as the founder of the Continental Army Cavalry. Recruited in Paris by Benjamin Franklin, for his talent as a horseman and zeal for liberty, Pulaski joined Gen. George Washington's army in 1777 and led a flanking maneuver that saved the Continental Army at the Battle of Brandywine. In 1778, he volunteered to raise a cavalry unit for the Continental Army. Pulaski created his Cavalry Legion, equipped and armed as lancers and dragoons in the style of his home country and trained to those standards. Many Continental Army officer spoke highly of the unit's fighting ability. He died after being mortally wounded, leading a charge during the Siege of Savannah, Georgia in 1779.

== History ==
Pulaski High School opened in September 1933, with 457 students and 17 teachers. The following September (1934) the enrollment had increased to 801 students and 26 teachers. By 1936, there were 1,400 students and 50 teachers. Pulaski now numbers about 850 students and shares their campus with Carmen Southeast High School, which is a Milwaukee Public Schools Charter. Beginning in 2018, Pulaski became IB Middle Years Program certified.

== Campus ==
Casimir Pulaski High School is located at the corner of Oklahoma and 27th in Milwaukee, Wisconsin. Casimir Pulaski High School is a large orange brick art deco high school.

== Facts ==
- Total Students (2019): 853
- Full-time teachers: 60
- Part of the Milwaukee Public School System

== Athletics ==
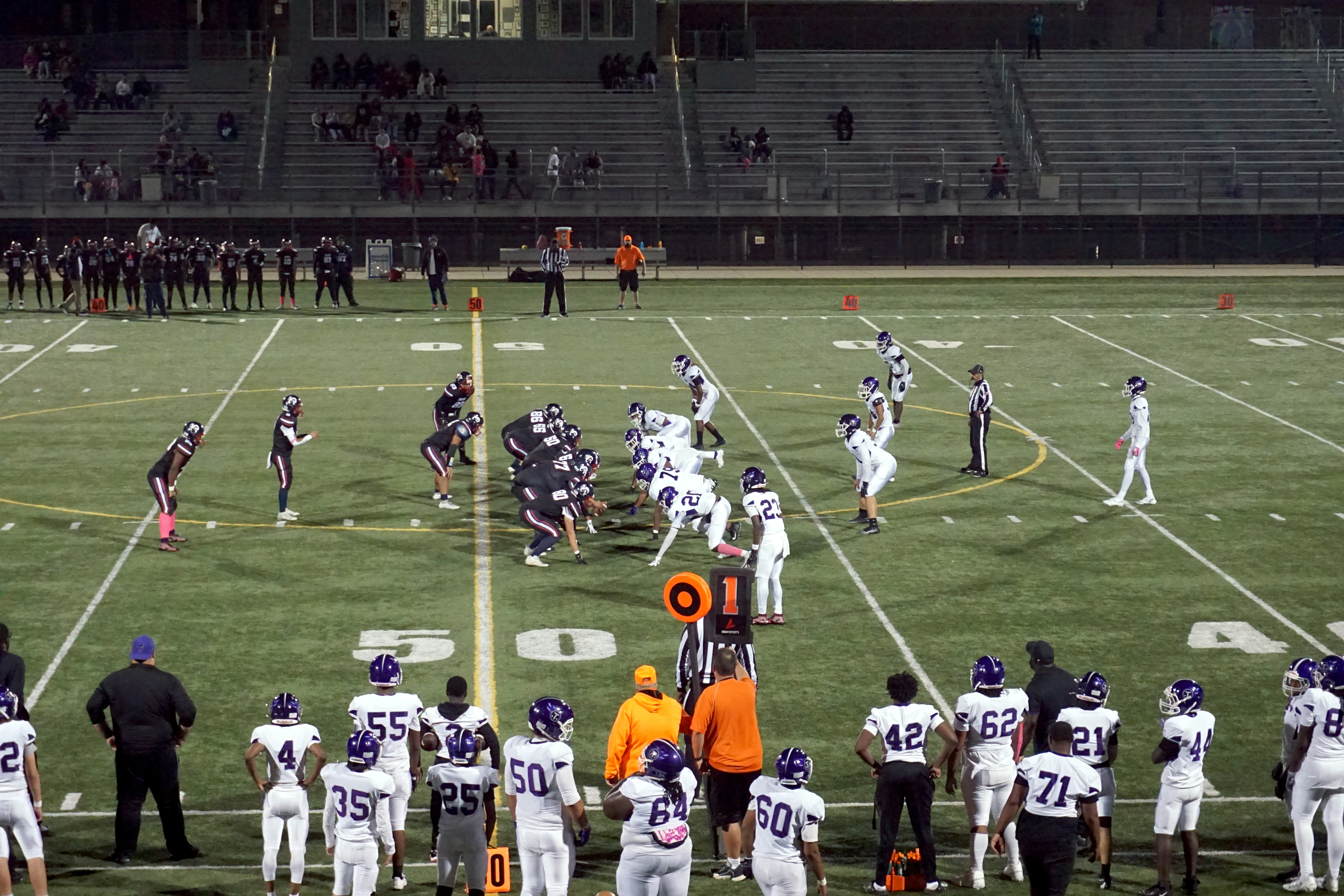
Pulaski playing football against Bradley Tech in 2025

Pulaski's teams are nicknamed the Rams, and they have been affiliated with the Milwaukee City Conference for most of their athletic history.

=== Athletic conference affiliation history ===
- Milwaukee City Conference (1933-1980)
- Milwaukee Area Conference (1980-1985)
- Big Nine Conference (1985-1993)
- Milwaukee City Conference (1993–present)

== Notable alumni ==
- Freddie Goldstein, basketball player
- Robert P. Kordus, Wisconsin State Representative
- Jameel McKay (born 1992), basketball player
- Robert J. Modrzejewski, Medal of Honor
- Fred Rehm (1921–2012), professional basketball player
