= Fred W. Vetter Jr. =

United States Air Force general

Fred William Vetter Jr. (August 13, 1921 – August 8, 2002) was a brigadier general in the United States Air Force.

Vetter was born in Snohomish, Washington in 1921. He graduated from Washington High School in Milwaukee, Wisconsin, and attended the University of Wisconsin-Madison. Vetter died on August 8, 2002.

== Career ==
Vetter was commissioned an officer in the United States Army Air Forces in 1943. He would serve in the final months of World War II. Later he served in the Korean War. In 1955, he was assigned to The Pentagon. After graduating from the Industrial College of the Armed Forces in 1963 he was named Chief of the Programs and Policy Division and Deputy Chief of Staff of Plans of the Military Air Transport Service. In 1965 he was reassigned to The Pentagon and was later selected to become Military Assistant to Secretary of the Air Force Harold Brown. He was later assigned to the Office of the Joint Chiefs of Staff. In 1969, he was given command of the 436th Military Airlift Wing. His retirement was effective on August 1, 1970.

Awards he received include the Legion of Merit with oak leaf cluster, the Air Force Commendation Medal with oak leaf cluster, and the Presidential Unit Citation/Distinguished Unit Citation with oak leaf cluster. Upon his retirement from the United States Air Force, Brigadier General Vetter was named secretary of the Delaware Department of Public Safety. He also served as Associate Administrator of the National Highway Traffic Safety Administration and in the Office of the Federal-States Coordinator for 55 mph Programs under NHTSA Administrator Joan Claybrook. Vetter was a strong supporter and vociferous defender of the 55 mph National Maximum Speed Limit for saving lives and conserving energy.
