= Milwaukee High School of the Arts =

Public magnet high school in Milwaukee, Wisconsin

Location
- 2300 West Highland Avenue; Milwaukee, Wisconsin 53233; United States
- 43°02′42.5″N 87°56′30.9″W

Information
- Type: Public (magnet) secondary
- Established: 1895
- Superintendent: Keith P. Posley
- Principal: Larry Farris
- Teaching staff: 55.73 (FTE)
- Grades: 9-12
- Enrollment: 985 (2023-2024)
- Student to teacher ratio: 17.67
- Colors: Crimson and White
- Website: https://mps.school/mhsa/

Established in 1895, Milwaukee High School of the Arts (MHSA), formerly West Division Sr. High School, is a high school in Milwaukee, Wisconsin, United States. It is a part of the Milwaukee Public Schools system. It specializes in preparation for a profession in the arts.

Students receive a minimum of two hours of arts study each day. Focus is given to creative outlets such as dance, writing, theater, technical theater, visual arts, and music. The school is open for auditions to students from the Milwaukee metropolitan area.

In 2005, the MHSA Artvarks, their ComedySportz Improvisational High School League Team took home the State Championship.

== History ==
West Division High School opened in 1895 in what was known as the "Plankinton library block" on Grand Avenue downtown, but a building was built to house the new school in 1896 between 22nd and 23rd Streets on what was then called Prairie Street. C. E. McLenagan was the first principal. In 1958, the current structure was built, facing the original facility across what was by then called Highland Boulevard.

The Milwaukee Public Schools system began designating a number of specialty or magnet schools in 1976. West Division was designated to house the Law Specialty and Navy ROTC programs, until in 1984 the Milwaukee Board of School Directors moved those programs to Bay View High School and elected to transform West Division into an arts school.

== Athletics ==
High School of the Arts' athletic teams are nicknamed the Crimson Stars, and their colors are crimson and white. When the school was known as West Division, they were called the Redmen. They have been affiliated with the Milwaukee City Conference for most of their history.

=== Athletic conference affiliation history ===
- Milwaukee City Conference (1895-1980)
- Suburban Conference (1980-1985)
- Milwaukee City Conference (1985–present)
