= Carmen High School of Science and Technology =

Charter school in Milwaukee, Wisconsin

Coordinates: 43°00′44.0″N 87°57′13.3″W

Carmen High School of Science and Technology is a charter school in the Milwaukee Public Schools district in Wisconsin. It is located at 1712 South 32nd Street in Milwaukee, Wisconsin. It includes a South Campus and a Northwest Campus. In 2021, it was ranked #1 best school in Wisconsin by U.S. News & World Report.
