= Golda Meir School =

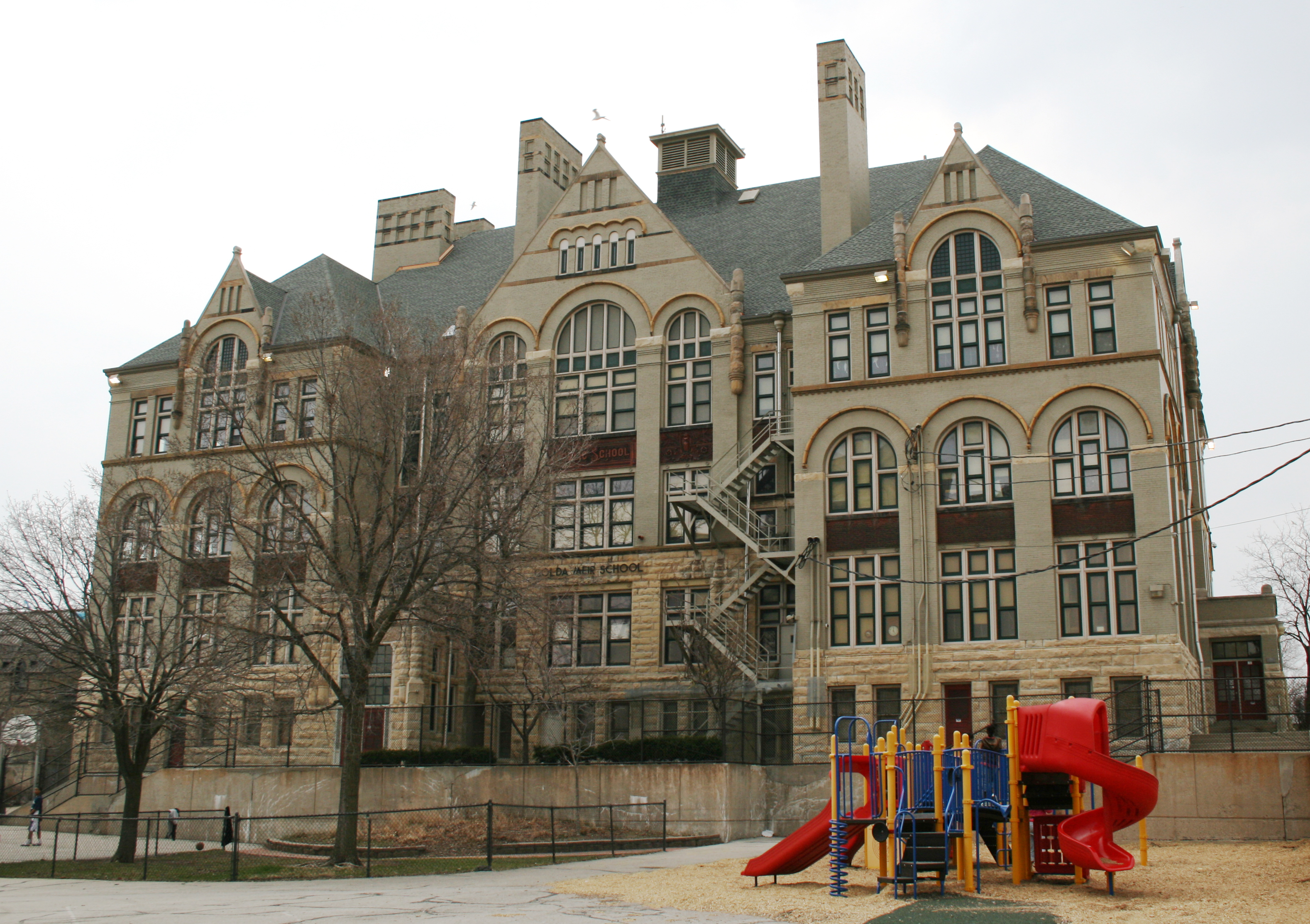

Location
- 1555 N Doctor M.L.K. Jr. Dr; Milwaukee, Wisconsin 53221; United States; 43°03′03.06″N 87°54′55.41″W

Information
- Established: 1889
- School district: Milwaukee Public Schools
- Superintendent: Dr. Brenda Cassellius
- Grades: K-12

The Golda Meir School (originally Fourth Street School) is a public, K-12 school school in Milwaukee, Wisconsin. Founded in 1889, the school offers classes for students in grades three through twelve.

In 1979 the school was renamed in honor of Golda Meir, the fourth Prime Minister of Israel, who attended the institution from 1906 to 1912. The school is split into two separate buildings, or campuses, with the lower campus building being designated as a National Historic Landmark in 1990 for its association with Meir.

== History ==
Situated next to the historic Schlitz Brewing Complex of the same era, the Fourth Street School, now the Meir school's lower campus, was designed in 1889 by Milwaukee architect Henry C. Koch in a Romanesque Revival style. The school was completed by 1890, and began operating on September 2, 1890.

Golda Meir is one of Milwaukee's original magnet schools, with the Gifted and Talented Program being implemented in the 1970s to further stimulate and develop the abilities of talented pupils.

In 1979, a two-block long mural on the school's playground retaining wall, titled "Milwaukee Illustrated", was started by students to commemorate Milwaukee's history. It was later removed in 1998 in favor of a new, updated mural titled, "Golda's Gallery: The Decades on Display."

Originally only containing 4 classrooms, Golda Meir suffered issues with capacity, and required grades 5 through 8 to attend off-campus. Thus, in 2011, the district expanded the school's campus to include the former Malt House of the long-closed Schlitz Brewery, subsequently renamed the Golda Meir School Upper Campus; the original building was thus named the Golda Meir School Lower Campus. This expansion allowed the full student population to be properly housed on-site, with Golda Meir adding grade 9 to the school in 2014.

In commemoration of the events of September 11, 2001, a "Labyrinth of Peace" was drawn on to the school playground. The single circuit labyrinth is used as a tool for students to reflect on what peace means to them.

== Campus ==
Golda Meir's campus is split between two blocks: the original Golda Meir School Upper Campus and the repurposed Lower Campus.

The school's Lower Campus building has an H-shape floor plan and 4 floors (which includes the basement), containing 16 classrooms, as well as an auditorium. A single-story heating plant was added in 1915, with a fuel room constructed in 1937. Fire escapes and enclosure of the stairways were added to comply with new fire codes in 1957. Renovation of the interior and exterior took place in 1976, during which a cafeteria was added.

== Golda Meir ==
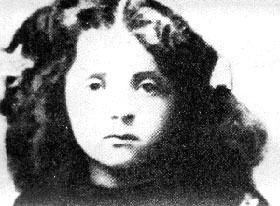
Golda Mabovitch, before 1910

Golda Meir was born Golda Mabovitch in Kiev, Ukraine in 1898 to a Jewish family and spent her early years in the part of Imperial Russia where Jews were allowed to live. In 1903 her father Moshe came to Milwaukee to work as a carpenter. In 1906 Golda, her sister, and her mother followed. The family settled on Walnut Street at the south end of the Brewer's Hill neighborhood, and Golda enrolled at the Fourth Street School.

She recounts in her book My Life that she "learned a lot more than fractions or how to spell at Fourth Street School..." When she was in fourth grade, Meir undertook her first public works project by organizing a fundraiser to pay for her classmates' textbooks. She rented a hall and scheduled a public meeting for the event.

In 1912 the girl who had arrived as a poor Jewish-Ukrainian immigrant with weak English graduated from Fourth Street School as valedictorian. Four years later she graduated from Milwaukee's North Division High School and entered teachers' college, but her interest in Palestine was growing. She joined the Labor Zionist Movement in 1915, led rallies for them, and during WWI worked for Jewish relief programs and taught Yiddish in Milwaukee's Jewish Community Center. She kept Milwaukee as her home base until 1920, when she and her husband moved to New York, then emigrated to Palestine in 1921. She later wrote:

I took a great deal with me from America to Palestine, more perhaps than I can express: an understanding of the meaning of freedom, and awareness of the opportunities offered to the individual in a true democracy and a permanent nostalgia for the great beauty of the American countryside.

In Palestine she worked for the labor organization Histadrut and in the 1930s she traveled back to the U.S. to lecture and raise funds for the Jews of Palestine. During WWII she worked to rescue Jews from the Nazis. In 1948, as European Jews flooded to Palestine and around the time the State of Israel was established, she returned to the U.S. to raise more funds for Israel. In following years she served as Israel's ambassador to the Soviet Union, Minister of Labor, Foreign Minister, and Prime Minister from 1969 to 1974.

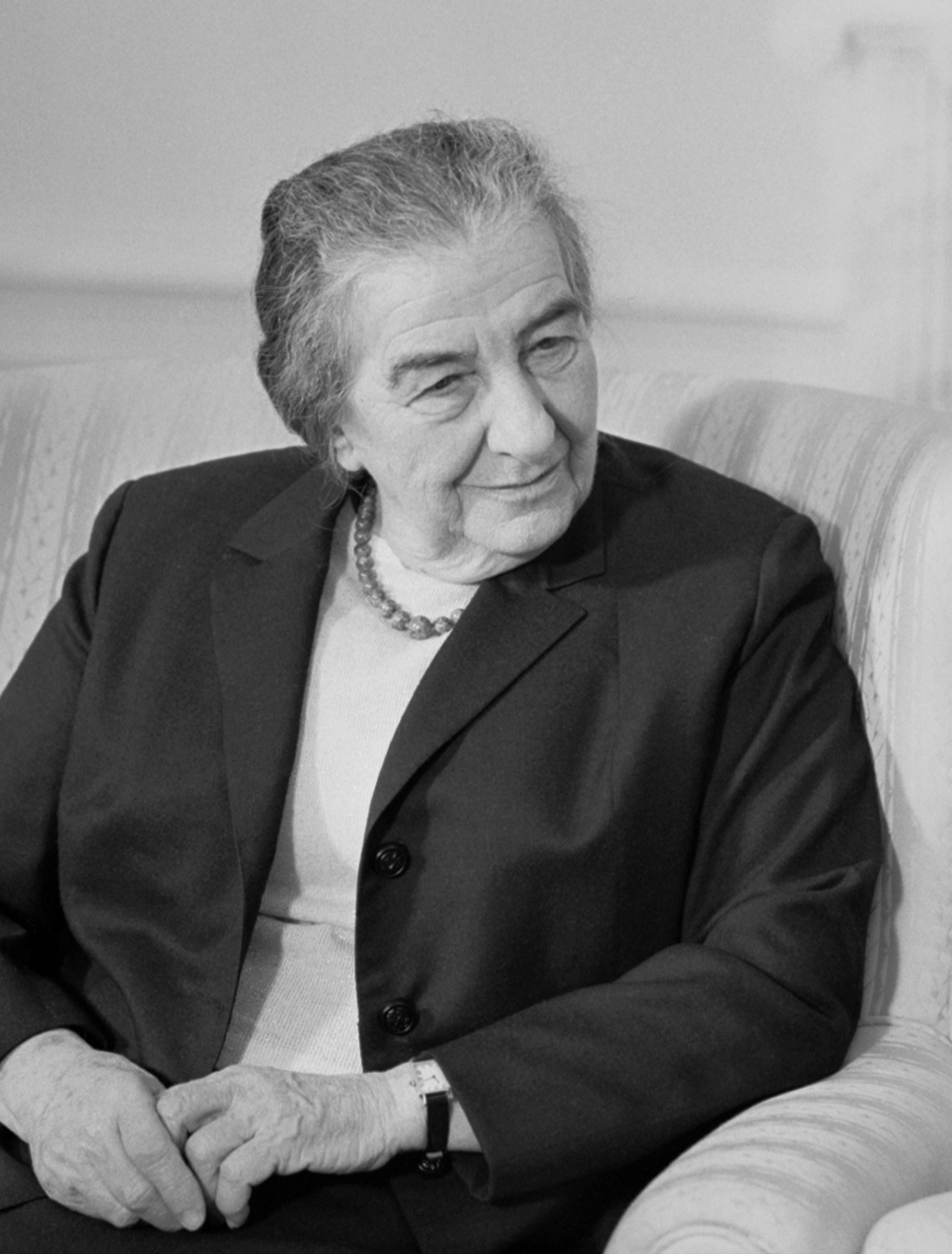
Golda Meir

On October 3, 1969, Prime Minister Meir revisited her old Fourth Street School in Milwaukee, accompanied by U.S. National Security Advisor Henry Kissinger and local Aldermen Vel Phillips and Orville Pitts. The school was renamed in her honor in 1979.

The school was listed on the National Register of Historic Places in 1984. It was declared a National Historic Landmark in 1990. It is one of three buildings in the United States with a significant association with Meir. A plaque mounted outside the front door of the school reads in part "it was here that she learned the values that carried her through life."

== See also ==
- List of National Historic Landmarks in Wisconsin
- National Register of Historic Places listings in Milwaukee, Wisconsin
