= MacDowell Montessori School =

MacDowell Montessori
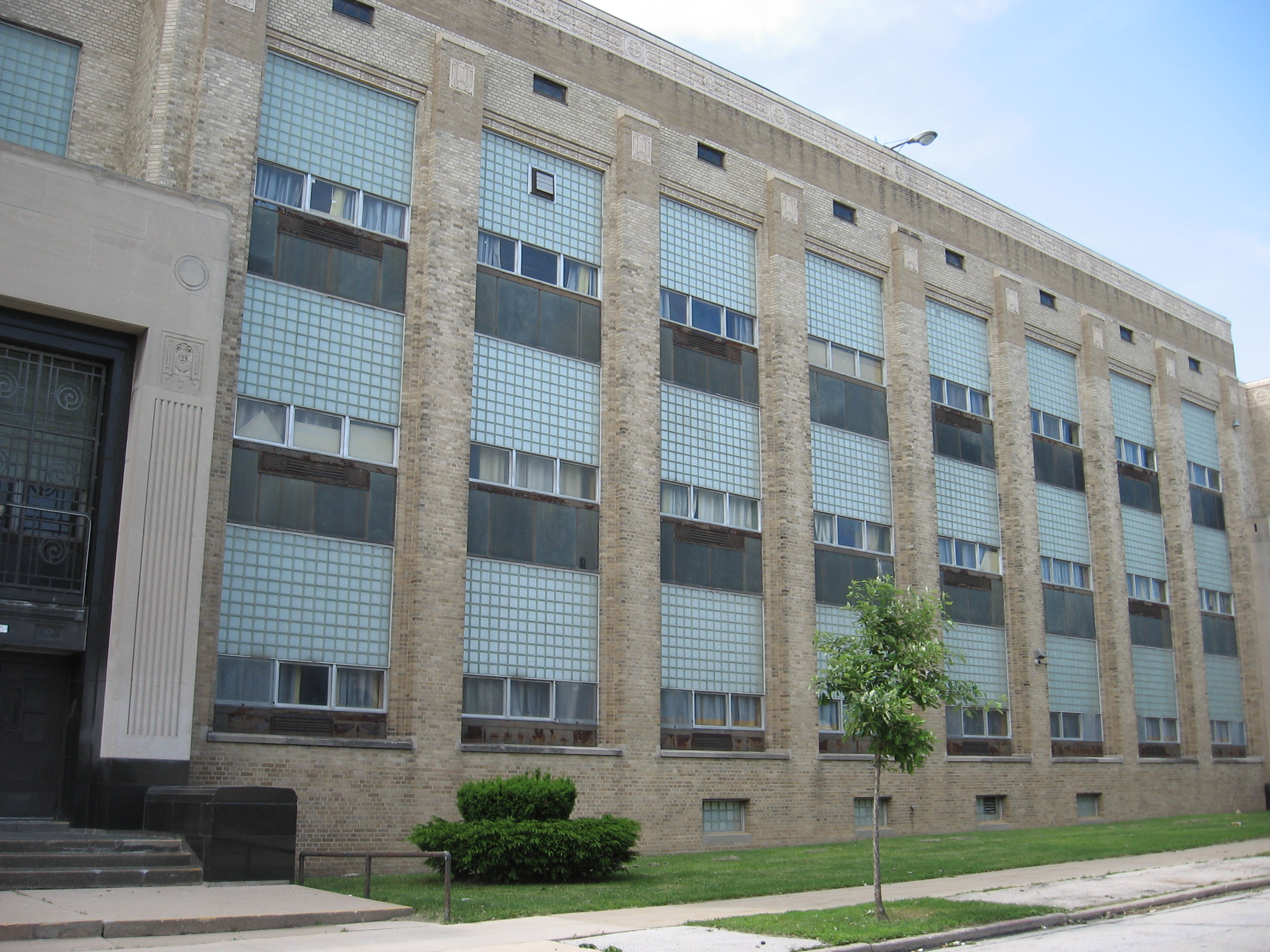

Location
- 6415 W Mt Vernon Ave; Milwaukee, Wisconsin 53213; United States; 43°01′59.4″N 87°59′34.3″W

Information
- School type: Public K-12 (magnet)
- Established: 1932
- School district: Milwaukee Public Schools
- Superintendent: Brenda Cassellius
- Principal: Andrea Corona
- Teaching staff: 44.70 (FTE)
- Grades: K3-12
- Enrollment: 823 (2017-18)
- Student to teacher ratio: 18.41
- Colour: Navy Blue/White/Red
- Athletics conference: Milwaukee City - Blue
- Mascot: Bucky
- Nickname: Pioneers
- Website: https://mps.school/macdowell/

MacDowell Montessori School is a public school that is part of the Milwaukee Public School District. Located at 6415 W Mt Vernon Ave it is on the west side of Milwaukee, Wisconsin in the Bluemound Heights neighborhood. The school building was built in 1932 as the home for Solomon Juneau Business High School which closed down in 2006.

The school began in late August 2009 as Montessori International Baccalaureate High School then during 2012–2013, they merged with Edward A. MacDowell Montessori School to now serve as a K3-12 school with an International Baccalaureate curriculum for grades 11–12, while using Montessori education for K3-12.

== About the School ==
MacDowell Montessori School promotes concentration, practical life, and problem-solving skills as students apply knowledge in all subjects. At the K-8 level, classrooms are multi-age, combining the ages of 3–6, 6–9, 9-12, and 12–14. Students integrate science, history, geography, and the arts through lessons, projects, and community experiences. The high school program combines the Montessori philosophy with the International Baccalaureate program, which provides a rigorous curriculum for college preparation. MacDowell emphasizes the importance of productive community involvement and a humanistic worldview.

== International Baccalaureate ==
There are various diploma program course offerings at MacDowell Montessori that can be taken during grades 11–12.

== Montessori ==
Macdowell Montessori is one of many schools that use the Montessori method of education. The importance of developing a love of learning is central to the Montessori method of education. The Montessori method is based on the research of Italian physician and educator Maria Montessori (1870-1952), who developed the educational philosophy after scientifically observing children in learning environments. Dr. Montessori found that children have the effortless ability to absorb knowledge from their surroundings and develop confidence by teaching themselves. She developed educational plans based on the natural behavior of a child, untouched by adult commands, classroom competition or regimented schedules. Dr. Montessori's philosophy remains the foundation of an astounding educational practice today.

== Athletics and Extra Curricular Activities ==
There are multiple extracurricular activities for grades 1-12, as well as various school occupations for grades 7-12. The Solomon Juneau Business High School athletics program (Juneau Pioneers) is being used by MacDowell Montessori for cross country, girls volleyball, girls & boys basketball, cheerleading, girls & boys golf, and girls & boys tennis under the name Milwaukee Juneau. They co-op with different schools for football, girls & boys swim, girls & boys soccer, wrestling, track & field, baseball, and girls softball.

== School Tradition ==
A tradition from Solomon Juneau High School of not stepping on the Main Entrance Mosaic is also tradition within MacDowell Montessori.

== Notable graduates of Solomon Juneau Business High School ==
- Robert A. Collins, Wisconsin State Assemblyman
- Pat Curran, football player
- James Lovell, astronaut, missions to the Moon with Apollo 8 and Apollo 13
  - Lovell's wife, Marilyn (they met at Juneau)
- Ann Morgan Guilbert, actress
- Dennis J. O'Boyle, professional broadcast announcer, DJ, and MC
