= Riverside University High School =

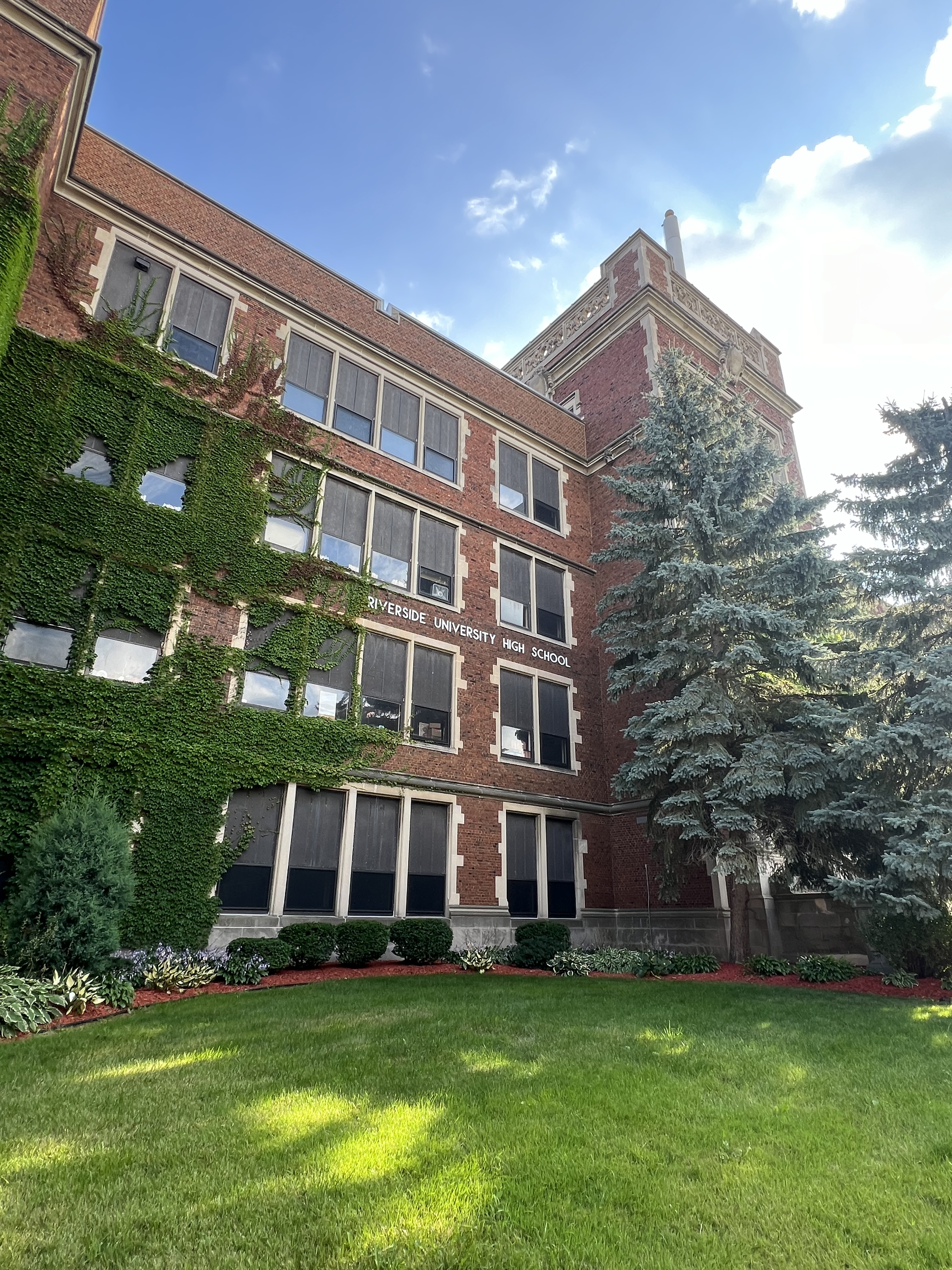

Location
- 1615 East Locust Street; Milwaukee, Wisconsin 53211; United States; 43°4′14″N 87°53′23″W

Information
- Type: Public
- Established: 1912
- Principal: Jeffrey Lasky
- Teaching staff: 78.73 (FTE)
- Grades: 9–12
- Enrollment: 1,162 (2023–2024)
- Student to teacher ratio: 14.76
- Colors: Orange and black and white
- Mascot: Tiger
- Newspaper: Riverside News Network
- Yearbook: The Mercury
- Website: mps.school/riverside/

Riverside University High School is a public high school located on the East Side of Milwaukee, Wisconsin, with a college preparatory curriculum. It is a part of the Milwaukee Public Schools system.

== History ==
=== Pre-1912 ===
Starting in the early 1850s the newly established city of Milwaukee debated establishing a public high school. As early as 1860, Milwaukee had a high school program in the attic of an elementary school in the Brady St. area. The school was at a Jefferson St. location in its founding year of 1868. After several fires and increasing enrollment, East Division High School, also known as East Side High School, opened in the late 1880s. By 1906 ground was broken for a state-of-the-art building at 1615 E. Locust St. (East Locust Street was known at the time as Folsom Place.) Using then modern technology, the architect increased the window size by using a steel frame designed to bear the weight of the building. This also allowed for less restrictive and cheaper construction. This new design attracted local residents as well as residents in surrounding areas. The design was that of a four-story U-shaped building with a three-story square building inside. The buildings were connected via five skywalks on the second, "main", floor for access to the auditorium and two stairwells to access either basement level gym, nicknamed "the dungeon." The dungeon is now home to the liberal arts and theater department. This room is used for rehearsal purposes as well as final dress rehearsals. Many of the buildings around the school were inspired by the English Renaissance, Jacobethan, Collegiate Gothic facade of the school, designed by the Milwaukee architectural firm Van Ryn & DeGelleke.

=== 1912–1945 ===
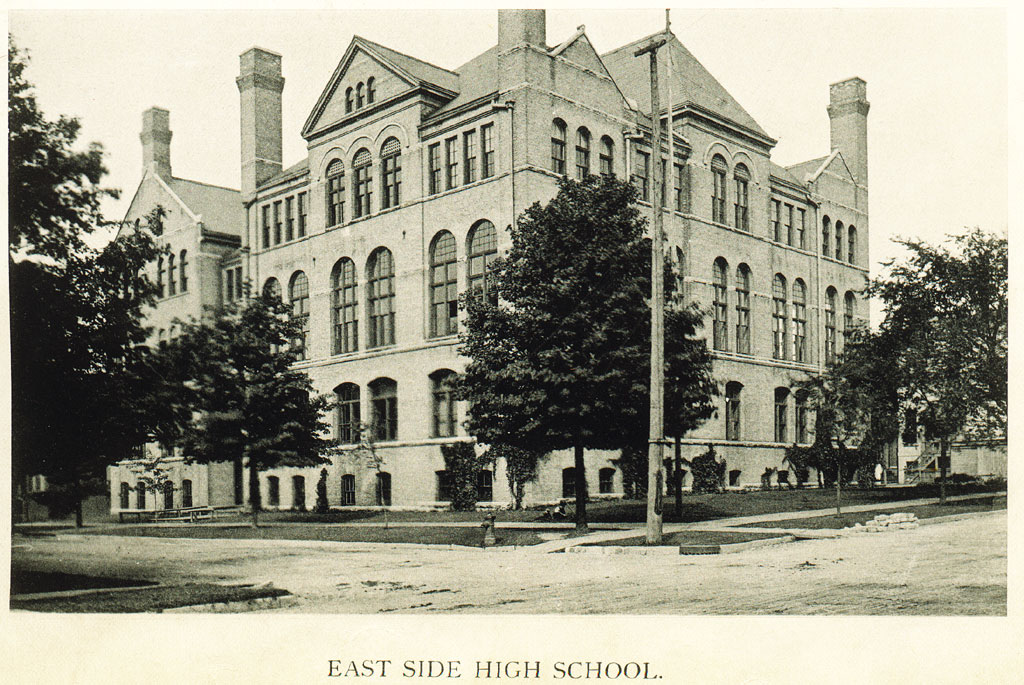
The former East Side High School

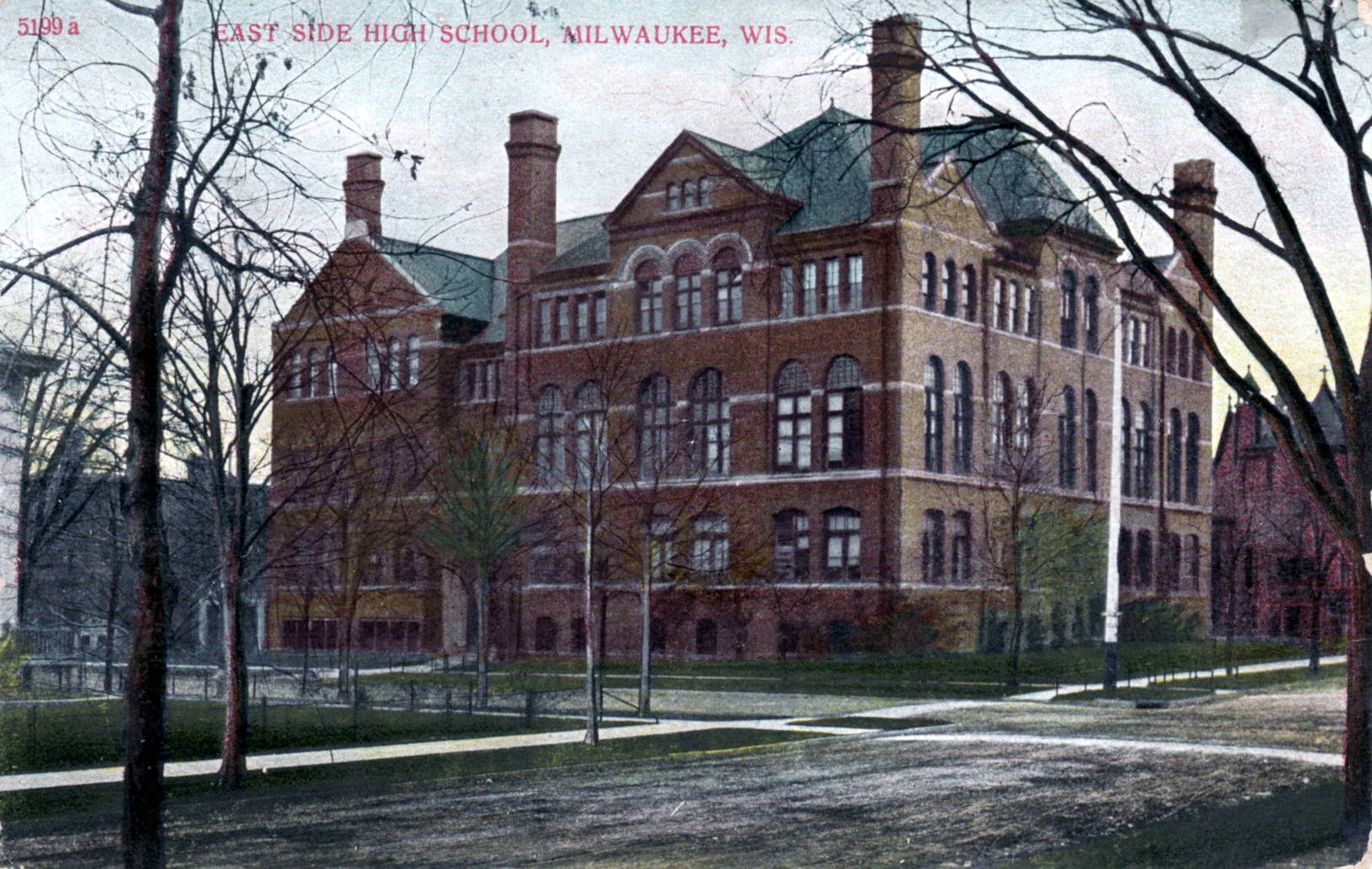
East Side High School, 1908 German postcard

The new building, dubbed Riverside High School, opened for classes in the fall of 1915. The school was also known as East Division High School until the mid-1980s. East Division was a typical early 20th century high school with a mostly Caucasian student population. The population was segregated at the time because many local residents on the east side of Milwaukee only attended. It was considered the neighborhood school.

Until 1941 Riverside did not have a school cafeteria and lacked a full library. Riverside then received a renovation and a three-story addition that added a third gym and a full cafeteria to the rear of the building, turning the U shape of the school into a square on all but the fourth floor. The third gym was originally intended to be a new pool, but cost and a looming war made a new pool impractical.

=== 1945–1960s ===
Riverside celebrated its centennial in 1968, "one hundred years ... since it opened its doors on Jefferson St."

Academic departments at the time of the centennial were English, Mathematics, Physical Science (general science, biology, chemistry, physics), Social Science (geography, sociology, economics, history), Foreign Language (French, Latin, Spanish, German), Business Education (typing, shorthand, business law, salesmanship, data processing), Industrial Arts (mechanical drawing, metalwork, machinery), Home Economics, Music, Art, and Physical Education.

Extracurricular activities then included the Student Council (which began as the Student Board in 1925); the Mercury yearbook (the name also used at East in 1892 for the first student newspaper in Milwaukee, which later became a magazine); the Riverside Rocket student newspaper (which started publication in 1955); musical groups – the Senior Band, the orchestra, five singing groups, as well as the largest drill team in the state (the Rockettes, organized in 1954); other fine-arts clubs and activities – Cue Club (drama, started 1916), Cumudeama (CUlture MUsic DEbate drAMA, 1963), Camera Club (1966), a separate Debate Club (1967), as well as the Junior–Senior play (which was performed as early as 1911); clubs dedicated to the relevant culture of each of the four foreign languages offered; the American Field Service (which started locally in 1958); one or two science clubs; the Social Science Club (established 1963); Camaraderie, a girls' social club (begun 1908); Home Economics Club (started as Household Arts in 1919, renamed in 1945); the vocational clubs Future Business Leaders of America and Future Teachers of America (FTA originating in 1958); athletic clubs, activities, and teams – Pep Club (in its sixth year in 1968), Cheerleaders, Girls Athletic Association. Boys' sports were (in the fall) football, cross country; (winter) basketball, swimming, gymnastics, wrestling; (spring) tennis, golf, baseball, and track.

=== 1970s ===
By the 1970s Riverside High school, like many older urban schools, was in a state of rapid decay. The windows leaked water and snow, and the building's heating system was unable to keep the staff and students warm. Nearly all aspects of the building were in disrepair. It was decided that a second addition and a renovation were in order. After a careful review, the building was retrofitted with new Plexiglass windows. Unfortunately the new windows yellowed over time and blocked much of the sunlight, as well as covered most of the window frame.

In 1978 a new building was added next to Riverside that included a six-lane 25-yard pool, a gym larger than both the original gyms combined, two auto shops, a foundry room, two metal shops, a drivers' education room, a fitness center, and more general classroom space. This extra space allowed the third floor cafeteria to be converted into a large library with three special media centers, while the basement level gym was turned into a cafeteria. The new addition created several dead spaces rarely seen, including the old gym seating behind a wall on the first floor near the rear hallway, and the staircases. The staircases run from the first floor to the fourth floor and are located between the old building and the new building elevator. The new building made Riverside compatible with the Americans with Disabilities Act of 1990 by adding street level and basement level ramps, as well as adding a second elevator; the original elevator is now used primarily as a service elevator. It was one of the first schools in Milwaukee to do so. The addition also added three open "commons" areas, the Cafeteria Commons, the Pool Commons and the Leonard Commons (named after Larry Leonard, a former assistant principal, coach, and special ed teacher who passed in 2003), often used for gatherings.

=== 1980s to 2000s ===
Along with several other schools in Milwaukee, the 1980s saw major curriculum changes for Riverside. Advanced Placement classes were added and the school was rededicated as Riverside University High School. The nicknames "East Division" and "East Side" were dropped from the daily lexicon. With its new partnership with the University of Wisconsin–Milwaukee, Riverside had transformed itself from a decaying urban school into one of the best AP based high schools in the nation. Along with Rufus King International School – High School Campus, Milwaukee High School of the Arts, and Milwaukee School of Languages, Riverside is considered one of the best high schools in the city. In recent years Riverside has made Newsweek's list of the best high schools in America. (2008–2010)

In 1997 the single sheet "Tiger Times" was revamped as a full sized school paper, "Word on the River." During the 2000s the curriculum was altered to add more focus on technology. Several rooms were converted to computer labs and the Anzivino Computer Lab was added. In 2008, the school began renovating the Leonard commons by adding square-wooden seats, carpeting, and two flat screen televisions often displaying photos of the school, different events, art work, and information.

In 2021, Riverside adopted a controversial phone policy, which requires that students' phones be collected in the morning, and only be given back to them at the end of the day. This sparked outrage amongst the student population and angered some parents and led to a petition and a protest. Despite these efforts, the phone policy was not overturned

== Athletics ==
Riverside has won sixteen Wisconsin Interscholastic Athletic Association state championships in boys' cross country (1913–20, 1923–28, 1933, 1935–36), claiming the inaugural meet in 1913 as well as the most in state history. They are a founding member of the Milwaukee City Conference along with South Division High School.

=== Athletic conference affiliation history ===
- Milwaukee City Conference (1893-1980)
- Suburban Conference (1980-1985)
- Milwaukee City Conference (1985–present)

== Performing arts ==
RUHS formerly had a competitive show choir between 1996 and 2004.

== Notable alumni ==
- J. C. Banks, soccer player
- James Batemon III (born 1997), basketball player in the National Basketball League (Australia)
- Fritz Breidster, American football player and Major General U.S. Army
- Brandon Brooks, American football guard, Philadelphia Eagles
- Frederick W. Cords, Jr., electrical engineer and state legislator
- Colleen Dewhurst, Canadian-American actress
- Terence T. Evans, U.S. Appeals Court Judge for the Seventh Circuit
- Thomas E. Fairchild, U.S. Appeals Court Judge for the Seventh Circuit, U.S. Attorney, 31st Attorney General of Wisconsin
- James W. Higgins, Wisconsin politician and businessman
- Tony Knap, college football head coach
- Alvin Kraenzlein, Olympic athlete
- E. James Ladwig, Wisconsin State Assemblyman
- Thomas J. Mahon, Wisconsin State Assemblyman and Milwaukee County judge
- Lester J. Maitland, aviation pioneer, career officer in the United States Army Air Forces, and Episcopal minister
- Eric Murray, American football player, Jacksonville Jaguars
- Phillip Nolan, basketball player
- Ronald G. Parys, Wisconsin State Senator
- Rudolph T. Randa, United States District Judge for the Eastern District of Wisconsin
- Antonio R. Riley, Midwest Regional Administrator of the U.S. Department of Housing and Urban Development
- John Romano, physician and psychiatrist
- Michael Schultz, film, television, and theater director
- Dave Schulz, politician, County Executive of Milwaukee County, Wisconsin from 1988 to 1992
- Nile Soik, politician, educator
- Gerald Walker, rapper
- Alondes Williams, NBA player
- Elmer Winter, co-founder of Fortune 500 company ManpowerGroup and lawyer

== Sources ==
- Johnson, Pat, ed. (1968). Mercury 1968.
- "Remember When...Riverside High School was being built?". Milwaukee Public Library. Remember When... Milwaukee: Milwaukee Journal. November 24, 1913. "When a photographer set up his camera in the middle of Locust St. between the streetcar tracks on a quiet November day in 1913, construction of Riverside High had been under way for some time. Designed by Milwaukee architects Henry J. Van Ryn and Gerrit J. DeGelleke in the Jacobethan style, the school was to have the flavor of an English college or an Elizabethan manor house. New construction techniques of the day allowed for large windows and therefore bright classrooms. Gothic and Tudor ornamentation completed the elegant building. Additions were made in 1941 and 1978, with remodeling in 1980–'85. Photo from the Don Mueller Collection at the Milwaukee Public Library."
- Reyer, Steven. "Golden Age: Riverside High School". Milwaukee Architecture. Archived from the original on March 4, 2016. "An excellent example of English Renaissance school building design, Riverside High School is constructed of red scratch-faced brick and Bedford limestone. The style is sometimes called Jacobethan or 'College Gothic'."
