= James Madison Academic Campus =

Location
- 8135 West Florist Avenue; Milwaukee, Wisconsin 53218; United States
- Coordinates: 43°07′33.8″N 88°00′48.3″W

Information
- School type: High school
- School district: Milwaukee Public Schools
- Superintendent: Jennifer Smith
- Principal: Jineen Mclemore Torres
- Teaching staff: 44.30 (FTE)
- Grades: 9–12
- Enrollment: 779 (2017-18)
- Student to teacher ratio: 17.58
- Website: Official Site

Madison University High School (formerly James Madison High School) is a high school in Milwaukee, Wisconsin, United States, part of the Milwaukee Public Schools system. It changed its name in 1996 to reflect a higher emphasis on meeting academic standards.

== Notable alumni ==
- Mark Maddox, (b 1968) is a former professional American football linebacker for ten seasons in the NFL for the Buffalo Bills.
- Christopher Scarver, (b 1969) convicted murderer best known for killing serial killer Jeffrey Dahmer in prison
- Dan Turk, (1962–2000) was an American football center and long snapper in the National Football League for Oakland Raiders.
