= Wisconsin Conservatory of Lifelong Learning =

Location
- 1017 North 12th Street; Milwaukee, Wisconsin

Information
- School district: Milwaukee Public Schools
- NCES District ID: 5509600
- NCES School ID: 550960000681
- Grades: PK-12
- Website: https://k12.mps.school/wcll/

Wisconsin Conservatory of Lifelong Learning (WCLL) is a Milwaukee Public Schools district school in Milwaukee, Wisconsin. It is located at 1017 North 12th Street.
