= Bay View High School (Milwaukee) =

Location
- 2751 S Lenox St; Milwaukee, Milwaukee County, Wisconsin; United States; 42.9946°N 87.89878°W

Information
- Motto: Believe in Bay View
- Founded: 1914
- School district: Milwaukee Public Schools
- NCES District ID: 5509600
- Superintendent: Keith Posley
- CEEB code: 501335
- NCES School ID: 550960001127
- Principal: Jeffrey Gaddis
- Teaching staff: 59.97 (FTE)
- Grades: 9–12
- Gender: Co-ed
- Enrollment: 956 (2023-2024)
- Student to teacher ratio: 15.94
- Colors: Scarlet and black
- Athletics conference: Milwaukee City Conference
- Sports: Football, Track (B/G), Basketball (B/G), Wrestling, Tennis (B/G), Volleyball (G), Soccer (B)
- Mascot: Redcat
- Newspaper: Oracle
- Yearbook: Oracle
- Website: mps.school/bayview/

Bay View High School (BVHS), previously Bay View Middle/High School (BVMHS), is a high school in Bay View, Milwaukee, Wisconsin. It is part of the Milwaukee Public Schools. Academic specialties include law, mathematics, science, and construction.

== History ==
Bay View High School opened in September 1914 with 150 students and 7 teachers. The school was then a one-building barracks without central heating. With German teacher Gustav Fritsche as principal, the barracks grew to a bungalow, and in 1922 classes were held in a new school, still in use today.

The four-story brick building was a vast improvement over the wooden barracks. Later renovations included the modernization of rooms and lighting; the separation of the east and west study halls into one-story units, later converted to classrooms; a library; and a little theater/conference center. In 1976, another addition to the building included a gym with 1200 seats for spectators.

The Oracle Newspaper was first issued in 1915. In 1917, the Oracle, then a booklet of 48 half-pages, began publication as a yearbook. With new facilities, athletics became an important extra-curricular activity, and included football, track and field, basketball, swimming and cross country. Early clubs included Girls' Club (1914), Stage Crew (1924), Art Club (1932) and X Club (1938). A student government association was organized in 1947, and the Redcat mascot was adopted in the early 1950s. In 1985, the girls softball team won the WIAA state championship.

=== Mid-20th century to 21st century ===
Bay View, prior to racial integration, was overwhelmingly populated with residents of Bay View. After desegregation, Bay View's student body changed its composition, and now the school's students come from all over Milwaukee. Older residents felt that the school lost its identity.

In 2010 the school had 1,153 students. 839 students living in the Bay View attendance zone went to other MPS schools, and that year 86 students at Bay View High lived in the school's attendance zone, making up 7.5% of the school's students. In the 2009-2010 school year the State of Wisconsin ranked it as among the lowest performing schools in Wisconsin, and area parents avoided the school due to substandard graduation rates and test scores. In 2012 Bay View was one of the high schools designated by MPS as a "metro school", meaning one of its lowest performing.

In 2010 Bay View became a combined middle and high school after Fritsche Middle School was consolidated into it.

The projected enrollment for fall 2011 was 1,761. That year a group of area parents started a grass-roots advocacy to have a university preparatory program at Bay View High due to the difficulty in admissions in area magnet schools.

Around 2011 the school installed Jesse Mazur as its principal. In 2012 various staff and others asked MPS officials to keep Mazur after Mazur revealed that MPS was listing the position of principal as being "vacant" for 2012.

In 2012 Milwaukee alderman Tony Zielinski described the school as unsafe after a fight at Bay View resulted in 30 students being arrested.

In 2014 the school had 900 students. That year Alan J. Borsuk of the Milwaukee Journal-Sentinel reported that the staff at Bay View were making efforts to improve the school's performance. In 2014 fewer than 20 students from Humboldt Park School matriculated to Bay View, due to the efforts of SpringBoard, an Advanced Placement (AP) preparation program.

In 2027, an article by Megan O'Matz published in ProPublica highighlighted that Bay View relies on public funds while alleging that the school earned "one star on the state report card." O'Matz indicated that, at the time of the article's publication, a tab on the Bay View High School website labeled as "Build Your Own Curriculum" is inactive.

== Demographics ==
As of 2014 there were 900 students. 58% were Black, 30% were Hispanic or Latino, and 10% were White. 65% of all students lived within 5 miles (8.0 km) of the school, and 10% lived within 2 miles (3.2 km) of the school.

== Academics ==
In 2009 the staff of the Discovery World museum created the course "The Art and Archaeology of Me" which allows students to document historical artifacts and historical information in Bay View historical sites.

== Athletics ==
BVHS won the state championship in boys' cross country in 1943, 1944, 1945, 1959 and 1960.

Bay View High School's traditional rivals are the Bradley Tech High School Trojans.

=== Athletic conference affiliation history ===
- Milwaukee City Conference (1914-1980)
- Milwaukee Area Conference (1980-1985)
- Big Nine Conference (1985-1993)
- Milwaukee City Conference (1993–present)

== Notable alumni ==
- Laurie "Bambi" Bembenek, former police officer convicted of murdering her husband's ex-wife
- Dwight Buycks, Former NBA Player, currently playing for Kalleh Mazandaran of the Iranian Basketball Super League
- Irv Comp, NFL player with Green Bay Packers in 1940s; member of Packers Hall of Fame
- David Crowley, 47th governor of Wisconsin, Milwaukee County executive and state representative
- Robert R. Heider, Wisconsin State Representative
- Salome Jens, actress
- Cavalier Johnson, Mayor of Milwaukee
- Esther Jones, 1992 U.S. Olympic gold medalist in track
- Amar Kaleka, filmmaker
- Tony Kubek, MLB player with New York Yankees
- Cal Luther, college basketball coach
- Michael McGee, Jr., former alderman of Milwaukee's Sixth District
- Sandy Pasch, Wisconsin State Representative
- Rosemary Potter, Wisconsin State Representative
- James A. Rutkowski, Wisconsin State Representative
- Lance Sijan, Air Force Officer and Medal of Honor recipient
- Christine Sinicki, Wisconsin State Representative
- Louise M. Tesmer, Wisconsin State Representative and Wisconsin circuit court judge
- Angela Nicole Walker, labor organizer and 2016 Socialist Party USA vice-presidential nominee
