= Madison City Series =

Wisconsin high school athletic conference (1923-2017)

The Madison City Series is a former high school athletic competition series, beginning in 1923 and ending in 2017. All members were located in the city of Madison, Wisconsin, including all four high schools currently associated with the Madison Metropolitan School District. The competition's six public members were affiliated with the Wisconsin Interscholastic Athletic Association, while the one private school that competed belonged to the Wisconsin Independent Schools Athletic Association.

== History ==
=== 1923-1930 ===
Location of Original Madison City Series Members

When Madison East High School opened in 1922, it became the third public high school in the city, joining Madison Central (founded in 1853 as Madison's first public high school) and the University of Wisconsin High School (opened in 1911). The next year, interscholastic competition began between the three schools. While the Madison City Series was never officially formed as an organization, the two major local newspapers (the Capital Times and the Wisconsin State Journal) kept standings between the three schools and the Knights of Columbus began offering a traveling trophy to the city's football champions on an annual basis. In 1925, two of the three high schools (Madison Central and Madison East) joined the Southern Wisconsin Conference (later to be known as the Big Eight) but retained the City Series competition alongside. Wisconsin High gained their own conference affiliation in 1928, when they joined the Southern Six.

=== 1930-1974 ===
Madison West became a member of both the City Series and the Big Eight after opening in 1930, bringing the City Series to four schools. This would decrease to three in 1934 after the loss of Wisconsin High, citing difficulty in maintaining both a Southern Six and City Series schedule concurrently and lack of competitive balance as reasons for leaving. In 1947, the Zor Shrine took over sponsorship of the football championship trophy from the Knights of Columbus. Central, East and West competed in the City Series for just over three decades before new high schools were opened in Madison due to overcrowding of existing facilities. La Follette High School opened in 1963 on the city's far east side, and Madison Memorial High School followed suit on Madison's far west side in 1967. Both schools joined the City Series immediately after opening, offsetting the closing of Central-University High School in 1969. In 1974, Edgewood High School joined the City Series, the first time a private high school had ever been included in the competition.

=== 1974-2017 ===
Location of Final Madison City Series Members

While the City Series held a level of significance among Madison high schools in its early years, the rise of conference competition in the Big Eight and state-level competition eventually superseded the City Series in both prestige and popularity. The Zor Shrine continued to sponsor a city championship among Madison's public high schools until 2017, but most City Series competitions tapered off in the late 1980s and early 1990s. Edgewood left the City Series at the conclusion of the 1988-89 season, which was the last time city standings were kept by the local media. The last championship awarded for hockey occurred in 1991, with Madison Memorial taking home top honors.

== Membership history ==
=== Final members ===
School	Location	Affiliation	Mascot	Colors	Joined	Left	Primary Conference
Madison East	Madison, WI	Public (MMSD)	Purgolders		1923	2017	Big Eight
Madison La Follette	Madison, WI	Public (MMSD)	Lancers		1963	2017	Big Eight
Madison Memorial	Madison, WI	Public (MMSD)	Spartans		1967	2017	Big Eight
Madison West	Madison, WI	Public (MMSD)	Regents		1930	2017	Big Eight

=== Former members ===
School	Location	Affiliation	Mascot	Colors	Joined	Left	Primary Conference
Edgewood	Madison, WI	Private (Catholic)	Crusaders		1974	1989	Independent
Madison Central	Madison, WI	Public (MMSD)	Tigers		1923	1969	Big Eight
Wisconsin High	Madison, WI	Public (University of Wisconsin)	Badger Preps		1923	1934	Southern Six

== List of city champions ==
=== Boys Basketball ===
School	Quantity	Years
Madison West	30	1932, 1933, 1934, 1935, 1937, 1943, 1944, 1945, 1949, 1951, 1953, 1955, 1957, 1958, 1959, 1960, 1963, 1965, 1969, 1971, 1972, 1973, 1975, 1976, 1977, 1980, 1982, 1983, 1984, 1988
Madison East	23	1927, 1932, 1936, 1937, 1938, 1941, 1943, 1948, 1950, 1952, 1954, 1955, 1956, 1958, 1961, 1962, 1963, 1965, 1966, 1967, 1970, 1973, 1979
Madison Central	16	1928, 1929, 1930, 1937, 1939, 1940, 1942, 1943, 1946, 1947, 1953, 1954, 1955, 1963, 1964, 1965
Madison La Follette	6	1968, 1974, 1981, 1985, 1986, 1989
Wisconsin High	6	1923, 1924, 1925, 1926, 1930, 1931
Edgewood	4	1975, 1976, 1978, 1987
Madison Memorial	3	1969, 1977, 1983

=== Football ===
School	Quantity	Years
Madison West	38	1931, 1932, 1936, 1937, 1938, 1939, 1942, 1943, 1944, 1945, 1946, 1948, 1951, 1954, 1955, 1957, 1958, 1961, 1963, 1964, 1965, 1969, 1971, 1972, 1975, 1976, 1977, 1980, 1981, 1985, 1986, 1989, 1994, 1998, 2008, 2012, 2016, 2017
Madison East	27	1930, 1931, 1934, 1935, 1939, 1944, 1945, 1947, 1949, 1950, 1951, 1956, 1959, 1960, 1962, 1968, 1969, 1973, 1974, 1980, 1986, 1990, 1992, 1994, 1997, 2004, 2011
Madison La Follette	21	1966, 1967, 1969, 1971, 1978, 1987, 1988, 1989, 1993, 1994, 1995, 1999, 2000, 2001, 2002, 2006, 2007, 2011, 2013, 2014, 2015
Madison Memorial	18	1970, 1971, 1978, 1979, 1980, 1982, 1983, 1984, 1986, 1989, 1990, 1991, 1996, 2003, 2005, 2009, 2010, 2011
Madison Central	13	1923, 1924, 1925, 1926, 1927, 1928, 1929, 1933, 1939, 1940, 1941, 1952, 1953
Wisconsin High	1	1931
Edgewood	0	

=== Boys Hockey ===
School	Quantity	Years
Madison East	15	1959, 1961, 1964, 1965, 1967, 1968, 1971, 1972, 1973, 1975, 1979, 1980, 1981, 1984, 1987
Madison West	12	1957, 1958, 1966, 1968, 1970, 1971, 1978, 1982, 1983, 1986, 1989, 1990
Madison Memorial	8	1974, 1976, 1977, 1979, 1980, 1981, 1985, 1991
Madison Central	4	1960, 1962, 1963, 1969
Madison La Follette	1	1988
