= Franklin School =

Franklin School may refer to:

- Franklin School (Boise, Idaho), listed on the NRHP in Idaho
- Franklin School (Jamestown, North Dakota), listed on the NRHP in North Dakota
- Franklin School (Lexington, Massachusetts), listed on the NRHP in Massachusetts
- Franklin School (Missoula, Montana)
- The Franklin School (New York, NY), a college prep school on Manhattan's Upper West Side, merged with the Dwight School in the 1990s
- Franklin School (Omaha, Nebraska), listed on the NRHP in Nebraska
- Franklin School (Phoenix, Arizona), listed on the National Register of Historic Places (NRHP) in Arizona
- Franklin School (St. Louis, Missouri), listed on the NRHP in Missouri
- Franklin School (Schenectady, New York), listed on the NRHP
- Franklin School (Washington, D.C.), NRHP-listed and a U.S. National Historic Landmark

== See also ==
- Franklin Elementary School (disambiguation)
- Franklin High School (disambiguation)
- Franklin Middle School (disambiguation)
