= Franklin Elementary School (disambiguation) =

Franklin Elementary School is a school in Kirkland, Washington.

Franklin Elementary School may also refer to:

== United States schools by state ==
- Franklin Elementary School (Corona, California), Corona-Norco Unified School District
- Franklin Elementary School (Burlingame, California)
- Franklin Elementary School (Franklin, Sacramento County, California), Elk Grove Unified School District
- Franklin Elementary School (Long Beach, California), Long Beach, California
- Franklin Elementary School (Loomis, California), Loomis Union School District, Loomis, California
- Franklin Elementary School (Oakland, California),
- Franklin Elementary School (Redlands, California), Redlands, California
- Franklin Elementary School (San Diego, California), San Diego Unified School District
- Franklin Elementary School (Santa Ana, California)
- Franklin Elementary School (Santa Monica, California), Santa Monica, California
- Franklin Elementary School (East Chicago, Indiana), East Chicago, Indiana
- Franklin Elementary School (Vincennes, Indiana), Vincennes, Indiana
- Franklin Elementary School (Muscatine, Iowa), Muscatine, Iowa
- Franklin Elementary School (Reisterstown, Maryland)
- Franklin Elementary School (North Andover, Massachusetts), North Andover, Massachusetts
- Franklin Elementary School (Detroit, Michigan) Detroit Public Schools
- Franklin Elementary School (Royal Oak, Michigan), Royal Oak Public Schools
- Franklin Elementary School (Anoka, Minnesota), Anoka, Minnesota
- Franklin Elementary School (Columbus, Mississippi), Columbus, Mississippi
- Franklin Elementary School (Liberty, Missouri) Liberty Public Schools
- Franklin Elementary School (Missoula, Montana) Missoula County Public Schools
- Franklin Elementary School (Omaha, Nebraska), Omaha Public Schools
- Franklin Elementary School (Summit, New Jersey), Summit, New Jersey
- Franklin Elementary School (Westfield, New Jersey)
- Franklin Elementary School (Franklin Park, Pennsylvania)
- Franklin Elementary School (Franklin, Tennessee) Franklin Special School District
- Franklin Elementary School (Houston, Texas) Houston Independent School District
- Franklin Elementary School (Pullman, Washington), Pullman, Washington
- Franklin Elementary School (Spokane, Washington), listed on the National Register of Historic Places
- Franklin Elementary School (Tacoma, Washington), Tacoma School District
- Franklin Elementary School (Pendleton County, West Virginia), Pendleton County, West Virginia
- Franklin Elementary School (Madison, Wisconsin), Madison Metropolitan School District
- Franklin Elementary School (West Allis, Wisconsin) West Allis - West Milwaukee School District
