= George Nelson Tremper High School =

Location
- 8560 26th Avenue; Kenosha, Wisconsin 53143; United States; 42.54958°N 87.84142°W

Information
- Type: public
- Motto: Be Respectful, Be Responsible, Be Safe, Be Your Best
- Established: 1964
- Principal: Steven Knecht
- Staff: 84.72 (FTE)
- Grades: 9-12
- Enrollment: 1,458 (2023-2024)
- Student to teacher ratio: 17.21
- Campus type: suburban
- Colors: Royal blue, scarlet and white
- Mascot: Trojans
- Website: www.kusd.edu/tremper/

George Nelson Tremper High School is a high school located in Kenosha, Wisconsin. Part of the Kenosha Unified School District, it was named after George Nelson Tremper, the principal of Kenosha High School from 1911 to 1944. The mascot of Tremper High School is the Trojan.

== History ==
Built to relieve overcrowding at Bradford High School, the original 272,786-square-foot (25,342.6 m^{2}) school was completed in the fall of 1964, with the first class graduating in June 1965. A successful referendum in 2005 gave the school a new, larger field house, team locker rooms, and a new weight room. In the summer of 2009, the cafeteria was remodeled and expanded into the original commons. A 2015 referendum enabled the renovation of Ameche Field in the summer of 2017, including new bleachers and press box, a new track, and new team locker rooms, as well as enlargement of the tennis courts and turfing of the softball and baseball fields.

== Controversies ==
=== Transgender Rights ===
In 2016, the school disallowed a transgender student from running for prom king, suggesting that he instead run for prom queen. The student initiated an online petition, and some of his schoolmates organized sit-ins, leading the Kenosha Unified School District to require the prom court ballot to list candidates "under the gender for which they identify". The school had also barred the student from using the boys' bathroom. The student filed a lawsuit against the school district with the U.S. Department of Education's Office for Civil Rights, seeking to be able to use the boys' bathroom.

=== Sexual Harassment ===
In 2019, the ACLU filed a demand letter to Kenosha Unified School District regarding the treatment of cheerleaders at Tremper and Mary D. Bradford High School. The letter discussed awards given out for teenager cheer athletes at Tremper having large breasts, as well as coaches making commentary on their genitals and other sexual comments on their bodies.

== Extracurricular activities ==
=== The Classic ===
Tremper's 2002 edition of the Classic yearbook Coming Up for Air, was awarded the Journalism Education Association First Place, Best of Show in April 2003. In 2006, the yearbook Shift Within placed second at the JEA/NSPA Denver, 2007 Conference.

=== Blood drive ===
Tremper Student Government annually organizes the largest student-led blood drive in Wisconsin (Approximately 2000 donors), as verified by The Blood Centers of Southeast Wisconsin.

=== Athletics ===
The athletic teams compete in the WIAA Southeast Conference. Athletic teams include:

- Girls' bowling
- Cross country - boys state championship in 1971
- Football
- Wrestling
- Hockey (Kenosha combined team)
- Baseball
- Softball
- Girls' gymnastics
- Boys' basketball
- Girls' basketball
- Boys' golf
- Girls' golf
- Boys' soccer
- Girls' soccer
- Boys' swimming/diving
- Girls' swimming/diving
- Boys' tennis
- Girls' tennis
- Boys' track
- Girls' track-2014 and 2015 Division 1 State Champions
- Boys' volleyball
- Girls' volleyball-2008 Division 1 State Champions
- Cheerleading
- Dance team

==== Conference affiliation history ====
- Big Eight Conference (1964–1970)
- South Shore Conference (1970–1980)
- Milwaukee Area Conference (1980–1985)
- Big Nine Conference (1985–1993)
- Southeast Conference (1993–present)

== Notable alumni ==
- John Antaramian, Wisconsin state representative (1983–1993) and 48th & 50th mayor of Kenosha (1992–2008 & 2016–2024)
- Kennedy Cummins, professional wrestler who goes by the name Carlee Bright
- Tristan Jass, basketball player and social media influencer
- James Kreuser, Wisconsin state representative (1993–2009) and Kenosha County executive (2008–2022)
- Reince Priebus, American lawyer and politician
- John Steinbrink, Wisconsin state representative (1997–2013)
