= Big Eight Conference (Wisconsin) =

Wisconsin high school athletic conference

The Big Eight Conference is a high school athletic conference with its membership concentrated in south central Wisconsin. All member schools are affiliated with the Wisconsin Interscholastic Athletic Association.

== History ==
=== 1925–1964 ===
Location of Big Eight Conference Members (1930-1964)

The Big Eight Conference was originally formed in 1925 as the Big Six Conference and its original members were Beloit Memorial, Janesville, Kenosha, Madison Central, Madison East and Racine. It consisted of the largest high schools in southern Wisconsin that were located outside of the greater Milwaukee area and was alternatively known by its official name (the Southern Wisconsin Conference) during its early years. The conference added a seventh high school in 1929, a year after Racine High School split into William Horlick High School on the north side and Washington Park High School on the south side of the city. Park took Racine's place in the conference when it was split in 1928, and Horlick joined the conference a year later. However, it wouldn't be known as the "Big Seven" for long as Madison added a third high school on the west side of the city in 1930, and they immediately became members upon opening. The original Big Eight lineup lasted for over thirty years before rapid growth created a rift that changed its membership in the modern era.

=== 1964–1970 ===
Location of Big Eight Conference Members (1967-1969)

As the metropolitan areas of the Big Eight grew, so too did the need for more space for high school students to relieve overcrowding. Madison opened a fourth high school on the city's far east side in 1963 named after Wisconsin politician Robert M. LaFollette. They joined the Big Eight in 1964 along with the new George Nelson Tremper High School on the south side of Kenosha. The existing high school in Kenosha was also renamed after local educator Mary D. Bradford. More changes were on the horizon, and three more recently opened high schools joined the conference. Jerome I. Case High School opened on Racine's west side in 1966, and two others joined in 1967: James Madison Memorial High School (renamed after Wisconsin politician Vel Phillips in 2021) on Madison's far west side and George S. Parker High School on Janesville's west side. Janesville's current high school was also named after local politician Joseph A. Craig in the process.

By this time, the Big Eight had ballooned to thirteen members (twelve after Central-University High School closed in 1969), and along with that growth came greater problems with scheduling and travel. In 1967, the five Madison high schools announced their exit from the Big Eight Conference and gave the three high schools in Rock County the option of joining them in a new conference, which they accepted. The five high schools in Racine and Kenosha formed the South Shore Conference after their forced removal from the Big Eight, which had a tumultuous ten-year history before it was finally disbanded in 1980.

=== 1970–present ===
With the Madison-area schools having successfully split from those in southeastern Wisconsin, the new-look Big Eight Conference began play in 1970 with seven schools (Beloit Memorial, Janesville Craig, Janesville Parker, Madison East, Madison La Follette, Madison Memorial and Madison West). Membership increased back to eight with the addition of Sun Prairie High School from the Badger Conference in 1977, and in later years the Big Eight added two other large metropolitan Madison high schools: Middleton in 1994 and Verona in 2008 (both formerly of the Badger Conference). Membership stayed at ten schools until 2022, when Sun Prairie High School completed its split into two schools. Sun Prairie High School became Sun Prairie East and Sun Prairie West High School was completed on the west side of the district. The following year, Beloit Memorial left the Big Eight after nearly a century of membership to join the Southern Lakes Conference.

=== Football-only alignment ===
In February 2019, in conjunction with the Wisconsin Football Coaches Association, the WIAA released a sweeping football-only realignment for Wisconsin to commence with the 2020 football season and run on a two-year cycle. The Big Eight Conference decreased its football membership from ten to eight schools, with the two Janesville schools leaving for membership in the Badger Conference's large-school division. They would return to the Big Eight for football in 2022, exchanging affiliation with the newly split Sun Prairie East and Sun Prairie West, who took their place in the large-school division of the Badger Conference. Beloit Memorial also left to join the Southern Lakes Conference for football, one year prior to moving over as full members in 2023.

== List of member schools ==
=== Current members ===
School	Location	Affiliation	Enrollment	Mascot	Colors	Joined
Janesville Craig	Janesville, WI	Public	1,521	Cougars		1967
Janesville Parker	Janesville, WI	Public	1,456	Vikings		1967
Madison East	Madison, WI	Public	1,763	Purgolders		1925
Madison La Follette	Madison, WI	Public	1,607	Lancers		1964
Madison West	Madison, WI	Public	2,302	Regents		1930
Middleton	Middleton, WI	Public	2,454	Cardinals		1994
Sun Prairie East	Sun Prairie, WI	Public	1,392	Cardinals		1977
Sun Prairie West	Sun Prairie, WI	Public	1,439	Wolves		2022
Vel Phillips Memorial	Madison, WI	Public	2,027	Spartans		1967
Verona	Verona, WI	Public	1,876	Wildcats		2008

=== Current associate members ===
School	Location	Affiliation	Mascot	Colors	Primary Conference	Sport(s)
Beloit Memorial	Beloit, WI	Public	Purple Knights		Southern Lakes	Boys Hockey (Note: Co-operative with Brodhead, Clinton, Hononegah (IL), Parkview, The Lincoln Academy and Turner)
DeForest	DeForest, WI	Public	Norskies		Badger	Boys Volleyball (Note: Joining the Badger Conference when it begins sponsorship of boys volleyball for the 2027-28 school year)
Edgewood	Madison, WI	Private (Catholic)	Crusaders		Badger	Boys Volleyball
Fort Atkinson	Fort Atkinson, WI	Public	Blackhawks		Badger	Boys Volleyball

=== Current co-operative members ===
Team	Colors	Host School	Co-operative Members	Sport(s)
Janesville Bluebirds		Janesville Parker	Janesville Craig	Boys Hockey
Janesville Phoenix		Janesville Craig	Fort Atkinson, Janesville Parker, Milton	Boys Lacrosse
La Crosse Lightning		La Crosse Central	Aquinas, Holmen, La Crosse Logan, Luther, Onalaska, West Salem	Boys Lacrosse
Madison Knights		Madison La Follette	Madison East, Madison West, Vel Phillips Memorial	Boys Lacrosse
Sun Prairie United		Varies by sport	Sun Prairie East, Sun Prairie West	Gymnastics, Boys Hockey, Boys Lacrosse, Boys Volleyball (Note: Splitting boys volleyball co-operative for 2027-28 school year)

=== Former members ===
School	Location	Affiliation	Mascot	Colors	Joined	Left	Conference Joined	Current Conference
Beloit Memorial	Beloit, WI	Public	Purple Knights		1925	2023	Southern Lakes	
Janesville	Janesville, WI	Public	Bluebirds		1925	1967	Closed (split into Janesville Craig and Janesville Parker)	
Kenosha Bradford	Kenosha, WI	Public	Red Devils		1925	1970	South Shore	Southeast
Kenosha Tremper	Kenosha, WI	Public	Trojans		1964	1970	South Shore	Southeast
Madison Central	Madison, WI	Public	Tigers		1925	1969	Closed in 1969	
Racine	Racine, WI	Public	Black and Gold		1925	1928	Closed (split into Racine Horlick and Racine Park)	
Racine Case	Racine, WI	Public	Eagles		1966	1970	South Shore	Southeast
Racine Horlick	Racine, WI	Public	Rebels		1929	1970	South Shore	Southeast
Racine Park	Racine, WI	Public	Panthers		1928	1970	South Shore	Southeast

== Membership map ==
Big Eight Conference
Location of Big Eight Conference full members:
1 Janesville Craig
2 Janesville Parker
3 Madison East
4 Madison LaFollette
5 Madison West
6 Middleton
7 Sun Prairie East
8 Sun Prairie West
9 Vel Phillips Memorial
10 Verona

== Sponsored sports ==
	Baseball	Boys Basketball	Girls Basketball	Boys Cross Country	Girls Cross Country	Football	Boys Golf	Girls Golf	Gymnastics	Boys Hockey	Boys Lacrosse	Boys Soccer	Girls Soccer	Softball	Boys Swim & Dive	Girls Swim & Dive	Boys Tennis	Girls Tennis	Boys Track & Field	Girls Track & Field	Boys Volleyball	Girls Volleyball	Boys Wrestling	Girls Wrestling
Janesville Craig	●	●	●	●	●	●	●	●	●		● (Note: Janesville Phoenix co-operative)	●	●	●	●	●	●	●	●	●		●	●	●
Janesville Parker	●	●	●	●	●	●	●	●	●	● (Note: Janesville Bluebirds co-operative)		●	●	●	●	●	●	●	●	●		●	●	●
Madison East	●	●	●	●	●	●	●	●				●	●		● (Note: Co-operative with Madison La Follette)	●	●	●	●	●	●	●	●	●
Madison La Follette	●	●	●	●	●	●	●	●	● (Note: Co-operative with Madison East)		● (Note: Madison Knights co-operative)	●	●	●		●	●	●	●	●	●	●	●	●
Madison West	●	●	●	●	●	●	●	●	●	●		●	●	●	●	●	●	●	●	●	●	●	●	●
Middleton	●	●	●	●	●	●	●	●	●	●	●	●	●	●	●	●	●	●	●	●	●	●	●	●
Sun Prairie East	●	●	●	●	●		●	●		● (Note: Sun Prairie United co-operative (host school))	●	●	●	●	●	●	●	●	●	●		●	●	●
Sun Prairie West	●	●	●	●	●		●	●	●			●	●	●	●	●	●	●	●	●	●	●	●	●
Vel Phillips Memorial	●	●	●	●	●	●	●	●	●	●		●	●	●	●	●	●	●	●	●	●	●	●	●
Verona	●	●	●	●	●	●	●	●	●	●	● (Note: Co-operative with Mount Horeb)	●	●	●	●	●	●	●	●	●		●	●	●

== List of state champions ==
=== Fall sports ===
Boys Cross Country
School	Year	Division
Madison West	1947	Single Division
Racine Park	1948	Single Division
Racine Park	1949	Large Schools
Janesville	1950	Large Schools
Madison West	1951	Large Schools
Madison West	1955	Large Schools
Janesville	1961	Large Schools
Janesville	1962	Large Schools
Madison West	1963	Large Schools
Racine Horlick	1966	Large Schools
Madison Memorial	1967	Large Schools
Madison Memorial	1969	Large Schools
Madison Memorial	1991	Division 1
Madison West	2004	Division 1
Madison La Follette	2006	Division 1
Madison La Follette	2007	Division 1
Madison West	2012	Division 1
Madison West	2014	Division 1
Madison West	2016	Division 1
Middleton	2017	Division 1
Middleton	2019	Division 1

Girls Cross Country
School	Year	Division
Madison Memorial	1980	Class A
Madison Memorial	1984	Class A
Janesville Craig	1991	Division 1
Middleton	1995	Division 1
Middleton	1996	Division 1
Middleton	1997	Division 1
Middleton	2006	Division 1
Sun Prairie	2016	Division 1
Sun Prairie	2017	Division 1
Middleton	2020-21	Alternate Season
Middleton	2021	Division 1

Football
School	Year	Division
Madison West	1977	Division 1
Sun Prairie	1995	Division 1

Girls Golf
School	Year	Division
Madison West	1972	Single Division
Madison West	1973	Single Division
Madison West	1974	Single Division
Madison West	1975	Single Division
Madison West	1976	Single Division
Madison Memorial	1977	Single Division
Madison Memorial	1979	Single Division
Madison Memorial	1980	Single Division
Middleton	2009	Division 1
Verona	2014	Division 1
Middleton	2015	Division 1
Middleton	2019	Division 1
Middleton	2020-21	Alternate Season

Boys Soccer
School	Year	Division
Madison West	1984	Single Division
Madison West	1987	Single Division
Madison West	1988	Single Division
Middleton	2004	Division 1
Madison Memorial	2006	Division 1
Verona	2019	Division 1
Verona	2022	Division 1
Middleton	2023	Division 1

Girls Swimming & Diving
School	Year	Division
Madison Memorial	1970	Single Division
Madison Memorial	1971	Single Division
Madison Memorial	1972	Single Division
Madison West	1973	Single Division
Madison Memorial	1974	Single Division
Madison Memorial	1975	Single Division
Madison Memorial	1976	Single Division
Madison West	1977	Single Division
Madison Memorial	1978	Single Division
Madison Memorial	1979	Single Division
Madison West	1980	Single Division
Madison West	1981	Single Division
Madison West	1982	Single Division
Madison West	1983	Single Division
Madison West	1986	Single Division
Madison Memorial	1988	Single Division
Madison West	1989	Single Division
Madison West	1990	Single Division
Madison West	1991	Single Division
Madison West	1992	Division 1
Madison Memorial	1993	Division 1
Madison Memorial	1994	Division 1
Madison West	1995	Division 1
Madison West	1996	Division 1
Madison West	1997	Division 1
Madison West	1998	Division 1
Madison Memorial	1999	Division 1
Madison Memorial	2000	Division 1
Madison Memorial	2001	Division 1
Madison East	2007	Division 1
Middleton	2016	Division 1
Middleton	2017	Division 1
Middleton	2018	Division 1
Middleton	2023	Division 1

Girls Tennis
School	Year	Division
Madison Memorial	1987	Single Division
Madison Memorial	1988	Single Division
Middleton	2013	Division 1
Middleton	2020-21	Alternate Season

Boys Volleyball
School	Year	Division
Madison West	1947	Single Division
Madison Central	1949	Single Division
Madison Central	1950	Single Division
Middleton	2023	Single Division

=== Winter sports ===
Boys Basketball
School	Year	Division
Beloit Memorial	1932	Single Division
Beloit Memorial	1933	Single Division
Beloit Memorial	1934	Class A
Beloit Memorial	1937	Class A
Racine Park	1943	Single Division
Madison West	1945	Single Division
Beloit Memorial	1947	Single Division
Madison East	1958	Single Division
Beloit Memorial	1969	Single Division
Janesville Parker	1971	Single Division
Beloit Memorial	1973	Class A
Madison La Follette	1977	Class A
Madison La Follette	1982	Class A
Madison West	1992	Division 1
Madison La Follette	2002	Division 1
Madison Memorial	2005	Division 1
Madison Memorial	2009	Division 1
Madison Memorial	2011	Division 1

Girls Basketball
School	Year	Division
Madison West	1976	Class A
Madison West	1982	Class A
Janesville Parker	1993	Division 1
Janesville Parker	2000	Division 1
Janesville Parker	2001	Division 1
Verona	2016	Division 1

Gymnastics
School	Year	Division
Madison La Follette	1983	Class A
Madison East	1987	Class A
Verona/Edgewood	2023	Division 1

Boys Hockey
School	Year	Division
Madison East	1975	Single Division
Madison Memorial	1976	Single Division
Madison Memorial	1977	Single Division
Madison East	1978	Single Division
Madison Memorial	1979	Single Division
Madison Memorial	1980	Single Division
Madison West	1983	Single Division
Madison Memorial	1985	Single Division
Madison East	1987	Single Division
Madison Memorial	1988	Single Division
Sun Prairie	1997	Single Division
Madison Memorial	1998	Single Division
Beloit Memorial	1999	Single Division
Madison Memorial	2000	Single Division
Verona	2014	Single Division
Verona	2020	Division 1

Skating
School	Year	Division
Madison Central	1926	Single Division
Madison Central	1928	Single Division

Boys Swimming & Diving
School	Year	Division
Kenosha	1929	Single Division
Kenosha	1930	Single Division
Kenosha	1931	Single Division
Kenosha	1934	Single Division
Kenosha	1952	Single Division
Janesville	1955	Single Division
Janesville	1961	Single Division
Beloit Memorial	1975	Single Division
Beloit Memorial	1976	Single Division
Madison West	1977	Single Division
Madison West	1978	Single Division
Madison West	1979	Single Division
Madison Memorial	1980	Single Division
Madison Memorial	1981	Single Division
Madison West	1982	Single Division
Madison West	1983	Single Division
Madison West	1984	Single Division
Madison West	1985	Single Division
Madison Memorial	1986	Single Division
Madison West	1987	Single Division
Madison West	1988	Single Division
Madison West	1989	Single Division
Madison West	1990	Single Division
Madison West	1991	Single Division
Madison Memorial	1992	Single Division
Madison West	1993	Division 1
Madison Memorial	1994	Division 1
Madison Memorial	1996	Division 1
Madison Memorial	2005	Division 1
Madison Memorial	2006	Division 1
Madison Memorial	2007	Division 1
Madison Memorial	2009	Division 1
Madison Memorial	2011	Division 1
Madison Memorial	2012	Division 1
Madison Memorial	2013	Division 1
Madison Memorial	2014	Division 1
Madison Memorial	2015	Division 1
Madison Memorial	2016	Division 1
Madison West	2018	Division 1
Madison West	2019	Division 1
Middleton	2020	Division 1
Sun Prairie	2021	Division 1
Middleton	2023	Division 1
Middleton	2024	Division 1
Middleton	2026	Division 1

Boys Wrestling
School	Year	Division
Madison East	1955	Single Division
Kenosha	1956	Single Division
Madison West	1965	Single Division
Racine Park	1967	Single Division
Racine Park	1969	Single Division

=== Spring sports ===
Baseball
School	Year	Division
Madison Central	1949	Single Division
Madison West	1952	Single Division
Kenosha	1963	Single Division
Beloit Memorial	1965	Single Division
Madison East	1967	Single Division
Kenosha Tremper	1969	Single Division
Janesville Parker	1977	Single Division
Janesville Craig	1983	Class A
Janesville Craig	1984	Class A
Janesville Craig	1988	Class A
Madison Memorial	1990	Class A
Madison Memorial	1992	Division 1
Sun Prairie	1994	Division 1
Sun Prairie	1997	Division 1
Middleton	2003	Division 1
Sun Prairie	2005	Division 1
Sun Prairie	2006	Division 1
Sun Prairie	2012	Division 1
Sun Prairie	2013	Division 1
Sun Prairie	2014	Division 1
Janesville Craig	2015	Division 1
Sun Prairie	2021	Division 1

Boys Golf
School	Year	Division
Kenosha	1929	Single Division
Racine Park	1931	Single Division
Beloit Memorial	1932	Single Division
Madison West	1934	Single Division
Madison West	1935	Single Division
Madison West	1936	Single Division
Beloit Memorial	1945	Single Division
Racine Park	1947	Single Division
Racine Park	1948	Single Division
Madison West	1949	Single Division
Racine Horlick	1950	Single Division
Janesville	1951	Single Division
Racine Horlick	1952	Single Division
Janesville	1953	Single Division
Madison West	1956	Single Division
Madison West	1957	Single Division
Racine Park	1958	Single Division
Madison West	1960	Single Division
Madison West	1961	Single Division
Madison West	1962	Single Division
Janesville	1963	Single Division
Madison East	1965	Single Division
Madison West	1966	Single Division
Madison West	1967	Single Division
Racine Park	1968	Single Division
Racine Park	1970	Single Division
Madison Memorial	1972	Single Division
Madison West	1976	Single Division
Madison Memorial	1984	Single Division
Madison West	1987	Single Division
Madison West	1988	Class A
Madison Memorial	1990	Class A
Sun Prairie	1991	Division 1
Madison West	1995	Division 1
Middleton	1997	Division 1
Middleton	1998	Division 1
Middleton	1999	Division 1
Madison La Follette	2003	Division 1
Middleton	2011	Division 1
Middleton	2026	Division 1

Boys Lacrosse
School	Year	Division
Middleton	2024	Single Division

Girls Soccer
School	Year	Division
Madison Memorial	1986	Single Division
Madison Memorial	1987	Single Division
Madison West	1988	Single Division
Madison West	1991	Single Division
Madison West	1999	Division 1
Madison West	2000	Division 1
Middleton	2006	Division 1
Verona	2010	Division 1
Madison West	2012	Division 1

Softball
School	Year	Division
Madison West	1976	Single Division
Sun Prairie	2018	Division 1

Boys Tennis
School	Year	Division
Racine Park	1931	Single Division
Madison West	1948	Single Division

Boys Track & Field
School	Year	Division
Kenosha	1927	Class A
Madison West	1942	Class A
Madison West	1944	Class A
Kenosha	1947	Class A
Madison West	1948	Class A
Beloit Memorial	1949	Class A
Madison West	1951	Class A
Madison West	1952	Class A
Madison West	1953	Class A
Madison West	1956	Class A
Kenosha	1957	Class A
Madison West	1964	Class A
Kenosha Bradford	1965	Class A
Racine Horlick	1968	Class A
Madison La Follette	1969	Class A
Madison Memorial	1970	Class A
Racine Case	1970	Class A
Madison Memorial	1973	Class A
Beloit Memorial	1977	Class A
Beloit Memorial	1991	Division 1
Madison La Follette	2002	Division 1

Girls Track & Field
School	Year	Division
Madison Memorial	1972	Class A
Madison Memorial	1973	Class A
Madison West	1974	Class A
Madison West	1975	Class A
Madison East	1977	Class A
Madison Memorial	1977	Class A
Madison Memorial	1979	Class A
Madison West	1980	Class A
Madison West	1981	Class A
Madison West	1982	Class A
Madison West	1985	Class A
Middleton	1997	Division 1
Middleton	1998	Division 1
Madison Memorial	2003	Division 1
Sun Prairie East	2026	Wheelchair

== List of conference champions ==
=== Boys Basketball ===
School	Quantity	Years
Beloit Memorial	21	1926, 1929, 1930, 1931, 1932, 1933, 1934, 1936, 1937, 1938, 1941, 1947, 1962, 1963, 1969, 1970, 1973, 1976, 1977, 1990, 2000
Madison West	18	1944, 1945, 1947, 1951, 1952, 1958, 1960, 1965, 1972, 1973, 1975, 1982, 1983, 1988, 1992, 1996, 1999, 2000
Janesville Craig	13	1971, 1972, 1978, 1980, 1981, 1984, 1987, 1989, 1991, 1994, 1995, 1997, 1999
Vel Phillips Memorial	13	2004, 2005, 2006, 2007, 2008, 2009, 2011, 2012, 2014, 2015, 2016, 2017, 2026
Madison East	12	1947, 1948, 1952, 1958, 1961, 1962, 1966, 1979, 1993, 2010, 2019, 2020
Janesville	9	1939, 1946, 1948, 1950, 1954, 1956, 1957, 1959, 1965
Madison Central	8	1926, 1927, 1928, 1929, 1939, 1940, 1942, 1947
Racine Park	8	1941, 1942, 1943, 1946, 1948, 1963, 1967, 1968
Madison La Follette	8	1974, 1982, 1985, 1986, 2002, 2003, 2020, 2022
(Sun Prairie) East	6	1996, 2013, 2016, 2017, 2018, 2025
Middleton	5	1998, 2001, 2016, 2023, 2026
Racine Horlick	5	1936, 1949, 1953, 1955, 1965
(Kenosha) Bradford	4	1927, 1931, 1935, 1964
Janesville Parker	1	1982
Sun Prairie West	1	2024
Kenosha Tremper	0	
Racine	0	
Racine Case	0	
Verona	0	

=== Girls Basketball ===
School	Quantity	Years
Janesville Parker	18	1982, 1987, 1990, 1991, 1992, 1993, 1994, 1995, 1997, 1999, 2000, 2001, 2002, 2005, 2006, 2007, 2008, 2013
Middleton	11	2007, 2008, 2009, 2010, 2011, 2012, 2014, 2016, 2017, 2019, 2020
Verona	9	2009, 2010, 2011, 2015, 2016, 2022, 2023, 2024, 2025
Madison West	8	1976, 1977, 1982, 1983, 1984, 1988, 1999, 2003
(Sun Prairie) East	5	1995, 1996, 2017, 2018, 2022
Madison La Follette	4	1975, 1978, 1986, 2026
Beloit Memorial	3	1979, 1998, 2004
Janesville Craig	3	1980, 1981, 2015
Vel Phillips Memorial	3	1987, 2020, 2026
Madison East	2	1985, 1989
Sun Prairie West	0	

=== Football ===
School	Quantity	Years
(Sun Prairie) East	19	1986, 1987, 1988, 1992, 1993, 1994, 1995, 1996, 1998, 2000, 2007, 2009, 2010, 2012, 2013, 2016, 2017, 2018, 2021
Beloit Memorial	17	1931, 1933, 1936, 1938, 1947, 1948, 1952, 1953, 1962, 1963, 1965, 1972, 1980, 1989, 1990, 1991, 1994
Madison West	16	1938, 1943, 1944, 1946, 1954, 1957, 1961, 1962, 1975, 1976, 1977, 1981, 1985, 1989, 1990, 2005
(Kenosha) Bradford	11	1925, 1929, 1932, 1934, 1942, 1945, 1950, 1951, 1955, 1956, 1959
Madison East	11	1935, 1937, 1941, 1944, 1949, 1960, 1962, 1968, 1973, 1985, 2003
Vel Phillips Memorial	11	1970, 1971, 1973, 1978, 1979, 1982, 1984, 2003, 2009, 2018, 2019
Middleton	9	1997, 1999, 2004, 2008, 2009, 2010, 2014, 2015, 2025
Verona	9	2008, 2009, 2010, 2011, 2016, 2022, 2023, 2024, 2026
Janesville Parker	6	2000, 2001, 2002, 2003, 2006, 2009
Janesville Craig	5	1970, 1974, 1979, 1983, 1990
Madison Central	5	1926, 1927, 1928, 1940, 1941
Racine Horlick	5	1953, 1954, 1964, 1966, 1967
Madison La Follette	4	1967, 1969, 1976, 2007
Racine Park	4	1930, 1939, 1958, 1960
Janesville	2	1937, 1942
Sun Prairie West	0	
Kenosha Tremper	0	
Racine	0	
Racine Case	0	

=== Boys Hockey ===
School	Quantity	Years
Vel Phillips Memorial	18	1974, 1976, 1977, 1979, 1980, 1981, 1985, 1988, 1991, 1992, 1993, 1994, 1998, 1999, 2002, 2003, 2004, 2005
Verona	12	2009, 2012, 2013, 2014, 2017, 2018, 2019, 2020, 2022, 2023, 2024, 2025
Madison West	8	1978, 1983, 1986, 1987, 1989, 1990, 1995, 1996
Middleton	7	2006, 2010, 2011, 2015, 2016, 2024, 2025
Sun Prairie	6	1988, 1996, 1997, 2000, 2001, 2007
Madison East	5	1975, 1979, 1982, 1984, 1987
Janesville Bluebirds	2	2006, 2008
Beloit Memorial	1	1988
Madison La Follette	1	1988
Sun Prairie United	1	2026
Janesville Craig	0	
Janesville Parker	0	
Madison Lakers	0	

== See also ==
- List of high school athletic conferences in Wisconsin
