= Franklin High School =

Franklin High School or Franklin Senior High School may refer to the following high schools, all located in the United States:

== California ==
- Franklin High School (Elk Grove, California)
- Franklin High School (Los Angeles, California)
- Franklin High School (Stockton, California)

== New Jersey ==
- Franklin High School (New Jersey), in Somerset County
- Franklin High School (Sussex County, New Jersey)

== Ohio ==
- Felicity-Franklin High School, Felicity, Ohio
- Franklin High School (Franklin, Ohio)

== Texas ==
- Franklin High School (El Paso, Texas)
- Franklin High School (Franklin, Texas)

== Other states ==
- Franklin Senior High School (Indiana)
- Benjamin Franklin High School (New Orleans), Louisiana
- Franklin High School (Reisterstown, Maryland)
- Franklin High School (Massachusetts)
- Franklin High School (Meadville, Mississippi), part of the Franklin County School District (Mississippi) in Meadville, Mississippi
- Franklin High School (Livonia, Michigan)
- Franklin High School (New Hampshire)
- Benjamin Franklin High School (New York City), New York
- Franklin High School (North Carolina)
- Franklin High School (Portland, Oregon)
- Benjamin Franklin High School (Philadelphia), Philadelphia
- Franklin High School (Tennessee)
- Franklin High School (Virginia)
- Franklin High School (Seattle), Washington
- Franklin High School (Wisconsin)

== See also ==
- Franklin County High School (disambiguation)
- Franklin Parish High School
- Franklin School (disambiguation)
- List of places named for Benjamin Franklin #Elementary, middle, and high schools
