= Delaphine Grace Wyckoff =

American microbiologist and educator (1906–2001)

- Born: Delaphine Grace Rosa; September 11, 1906; Beloit, Rock County, Wisconsin, United States
- Died: July 28, 2001 (aged 94)
- Education: Madison Central High School; University of Wisconsin–Madison
- Spouse: John Franklin Wyckoff (m. 1942)
- Scientific career
- Thesis: The Variability of Caseolytic and Sucrose-Fermenting Characteristics of Certain Bacteria (1938)

Delaphine Grace Wyckoff (née Rosa, September 11, 1906 – July 28, 2001) was an American microbiologist and educator.

== Biography ==
Wyckoff was born on September 11, 1906, in Beloit, Rock County, Wisconsin, United States. She had a brother, Ronald Chamberlin Rosa. She married John Franklin Wyckoff on August 17, 1942.

== Education ==
Wyckoff was educated at Madison Central High School. She then studied at the University of Wisconsin–Madison, graduating with a PhD in bacteriology in 1938. Her thesis questioned the reliability of fermentation and proteolytic reactions and was titled "The Variability of Caseolytic and Sucrose-Fermenting Characteristics of Certain Bacteria."

== Career ==
After graduating, Wyckoff taught at a North Dakota State University of Agriculture and Applied Sciences (now North Dakota State University) in North Dakota for four years. Wyckoff was then appointed associate professor of botany (Bacteriology) at Wellesley College, Massachusetts, later becoming Dean of Women at the institution.

In 1955, Wycoff published A Laboratory Guide in General Bacteriology. In 1960, Wycoff contributed to a film on Biological techniques, which was produced by Thorne Films in collaboration with the American Institute of Biological Sciences.

Wyckoff was a member of the American Association for the Advancement of Science, the American Society of Microbiology, the Society of General Microbiology and the National Association of Biology Teachers.

== Death ==
Wyckoff died on July 28, 2001, and was buried at Stroudsburg Cemetery in Pennsylvania.
