= Tom Braatz =

American football player and executive (1933–2018)

No. 84, 83, 85, 51
- Positions: Linebacker, defensive end

Personal information
- Born: May 12, 1933; Kenosha, Wisconsin, U.S.
- Died: October 30, 2018 (aged 85); Fort Lauderdale, Florida, U.S.
- Listed height: 6 ft 1 in (1.85 m)
- Listed weight: 216 lb (98 kg)

Career information
- High school: Bradford (Kenosha)
- College: Marquette
- NFL draft: 1955: 14th round, 159th overall pick

Career history
- Washington Redskins (1957–1958); Los Angeles Rams (1958); Green Bay Packers (1959)*; Washington Redskins (1959); Dallas Cowboys (1960–1961)
- * Offseason or practice squad member only

Career NFL statistics
- Interceptions: 2
- Fumble recoveries: 1
- Sacks: 1
- Stats at Pro Football Reference

Thomas Myron "Bubbles" Braatz (May 12, 1933 – October 30, 2018) was an American professional football player who was a linebacker in the National Football League (NFL) for the Washington Redskins, Los Angeles Rams, and Dallas Cowboys. He also was the former general manager of the Atlanta Falcons and Green Bay Packers. He played college football for the Marquette Golden Eagles.

== Early life ==
Braatz attended Mary D. Bradford High School, where he was a teammate of future Pro Bowl player Alan Ameche. He also practiced basketball and track.

He accepted a football scholarship from Marquette University, where he played as a two-way End. He was named the team's co-captain as a senior.

== Professional career ==
=== Washington Redskins (first stint) ===
Braatz was selected in the fourteenth round (159th overall) of the 1955 NFL draft by the Washington Redskins. He spent two years out of football, while serving in the United States Army during the Korean War from 1955 to 1956 as a crypto operator. He returned in 1957 playing both at defensive end and linebacker. He was waived on October 13, 1958.

=== Los Angeles Rams ===
On October 16, 1958, he signed with the Los Angeles Rams to play as a defensive end. After playing in one game, he was released to make room for halfback Clendon Thomas on October 20, 1958.

=== Green Bay Packers ===
In 1959, he was signed by the Green Bay Packers. He was released on September 22.

=== Washington Redskins (second stint) ===
In 1959, he returned to the Washington Redskins and was asked to concentrate on playing linebacker.

=== Dallas Cowboys ===
Braatz was selected by the Dallas Cowboys in the 1960 NFL expansion draft. He was used as a reserve linebacker, registering 49 tackles and one interception. He was placed on the injured reserve list on August 29, 1961. He would later announce his retirement.

== NFL executive career ==
After retiring as a player, he joined the expansion Atlanta Falcons as a part time area scout in 1965. In 1968, he was promoted to director of player personnel. He became general manager of the Falcons in 1983, a promotion merited by his success as director of player personnel for the club. In what was his 19th year with the Falcons, Braatz was recognized as one of professional football's finest talent scouts, a fact substantiated by the fact that nine different Falcons have gone to the Pro Bowl from 1980 to 1983. Braatz's input and direction of acquisitions enabled the Falcons to become not only competitive but also a viable contender for yearly playoff appearances, a feat accomplished three times since 1978. In addition to heading the scouting department, Braatz was also actively involved in player contract negotiations and personnel moves. Braatz's success, however, along with the Falcons, had not been sudden, working his way up through the organization over nearly 20 years and ultimately spending 22 years with the club. "I think Tom has proven over the years that he is a knowledgeable football man, and has earned the respect of people throughout the NFL," said Falcon owner Rankin Smith upon promoting Braatz. Braatz was featured in a front page article in April 1982 in the Wall Street Journal. During his time with the Falcons, the team drafted or acquired 24 players who played in 68 Pro Bowls, including Tommy Nobis, Jim Mitchell, Claude Humphrey, Jeff Van Note, William Andrews, Gerald Riggs, Steve Bartkowski, Junior Miller, Mike Kenn, Bill Fralic, R.C. Thielemann and Bobby Butler. The group also includes some lesser known Pro Bowlers such as George Kunz, John James, Scott Case and Jim "Cannonball" Butler. Buddy Curry and Al Richardson were named AP co-rookies of the year from the 1980 draft.

On January 31, 1987, he was hired by the Green Bay Packers as the franchise's first director of football operations. The position was created following several disappointing drafts under head coaches Bart Starr and Forrest Gregg. He was later promoted to executive vice president of football operations as the team record improved from 5-9-1 in 1987 to 10-6 and tying the Vikings for best record in the NFC Central in 1989. Bob Harlan was named president and CEO of the club in 1991 and he was replaced with Ron Wolf. During his tenure, Braatz drafted key players such as Sterling Sharpe, Leroy Butler, Chuck Cecil, Don Majkowski and Bryce Paup, among others.

Braatz was named the Dolphins' director of college scouting on June 12, 1992. During his tenure, he was responsible for the scouting of college players and Miami's preparation for the NFL draft, and in that role, he worked closely with Dolphins Head Coach's Don Shula, Jimmy Johnson and Dave Wannstedt and the rest of the team's football staff. During his time with the club, he played a key role in the selection of a number of players who made an immediate impact as rookies, including the 1994 NFL Defensive Rookie of the Year, Tim Bowens, wide receivers O.J. McDuffie and Chris Chambers, linebackers Zach Thomas and Derrick Rodgers, defensive ends Daryl Gardener, Jason Taylor, Kenny Mixon and Lorenzo Bromell, and cornerbacks Sam Madison and Patrick Surtain. He retired from the Dolphins in May, 2003.

In 39 seasons as an NFL executive, he drafted or acquired 45 players who participated in 117 Pro Bowls. His teams played in 17 playoff games. He was inducted into the Pro Scouting Hall of Fame and was awarded the Lifetime Achievement Award from Marquette University. He died on October 30, 2018, in Fort Lauderdale, Florida.
