= South Shore Conference =

Wisconsin high school athletic conference (1970-1980)

The South Shore Conference is a former high school athletic conference in Wisconsin, operating from 1970 to 1980 with its membership concentrated in Racine and Kenosha.

== History ==
Location of South Shore Conference Members

Prior to the creation of the South Shore Conference, the public high schools in Racine and Kenosha were part of the Big Eight, a conference of large high schools in southern Wisconsin that also included schools from Madison, Janesville and Beloit. As new schools were added to districts due to population growth, membership had experienced a net increase to twelve by the end of the 1960s. Tensions increased between the Madison-area schools and those in southeastern Wisconsin, and the South Shore Conference was formed in 1970 after the five schools in Racine and Kenosha were forced out by the rest of the Big Eight members. This was a move that was met with some opposition by the WIAA since a five-team conference was widely seen as inadequately sized. After several years of attempting to merge the South Shore Conference with several large conferences in southern Wisconsin (including a failed attempt to create a cross-border league with high schools in northern Illinois), the conference was dissolved in 1980. The five schools were spread out over four existing conferences before reconstituting as the Big Nine Conference (along with four high schools on the south side of Milwaukee) in 1985.

== Conference membership history ==
School	Location	Affiliation	Mascot	Colors	Joined	Left	Conference Joined	Current Conference
Kenosha Bradford	Kenosha, WI	Public	Red Devils		1970	1980	Braveland	Southeast
Kenosha Tremper	Kenosha, WI	Public	Trojans		1970	1980	Milwaukee Area	Southeast
Racine Case	Racine, WI	Public	Eagles		1970	1980	Parkland	Southeast
Racine Horlick	Racine, WI	Public	Rebels		1970	1980	Suburban	Southeast
Racine Park	Racine, WI	Public	Panthers		1970	1980	Milwaukee Area	Southeast

== List of state champions ==
=== Fall sports ===
Boys Cross Country
School	Year	Division
Kenosha Tremper	1971	Large Schools
Racine Case	1973	Class A
Racine Case	1975	Class A

Girls Cross Country
School	Year	Division
Racine Case	1979	Class A

Football
School	Year	Division
Kenosha Tremper	1979	Division 1

Boys Golf
School	Year
Racine Case	1974
Racine Case	1975

=== Winter sports ===
None

=== Spring sports ===
Boys Golf
School	Year	Division
Racine Park	1973	Single Division

Boys Track & Field
School	Year	Division
Racine Park	1974	Class A

Girls Track & Field
School	Year	Division
Racine Park	1978	Class A

== List of conference champions ==
=== Boys Basketball ===
School	Quantity	Years
Kenosha Bradford	3	1973, 1974, 1979
Racine Case	3	1971, 1977, 1978
Racine Horlick	2	1975, 1980
Racine Park	2	1972, 1976
Kenosha Tremper	0	

=== Girls Basketball ===
School	Quantity	Years
Racine Horlick	1	1980
Racine Park	1	1979
Kenosha Bradford	0	
Kenosha Tremper	0	
Racine Case	0	

=== Football ===
School	Quantity	Years
Kenosha Tremper	5	1970, 1971, 1973, 1977, 1979
Racine Horlick	5	1972, 1975, 1976, 1977, 1978
Racine Case	3	1974, 1977, 1978
Kenosha Bradford	0	
Racine Park	0	
