= George S. Parker High School =

Public secondary school in Wisconsin, US

Location
- 3125 Mineral Point; Janesville, Rock County, Wisconsin 53548; United States; 42.68555°N 89.06432°W

Information
- Type: public secondary
- Motto: Everybody's Somebody at Parker
- Opened: 1968
- School district: School District of Janesville
- Superintendent: Mark Holzman
- Principal: Christopher Laue
- Staff: 97.28 (FTE)
- Grades: 9-12
- Gender: coed
- Enrollment: 1,291 (2023–24)
- Student to teacher ratio: 12.85
- Colors: green & gold
- Fight song: "Green & Gold"
- Athletics conference: WIAA Big Eight Conference
- Mascot: Victor the Viking
- Nickname: Cow Pie High
- Team name: Vikings
- Rival: Joseph A. Craig High School
- Yearbook: Valhalla
- Website: http://www.janesvilleparker.org/

George S. Parker High School is a comprehensive public high school located on the west side of the city of Janesville, Wisconsin. The school, named for George S. Parker, founder of the Parker Pen Company, is a part of the School District of Janesville and was constructed in 1967. The rival east side school is Joseph A. Craig High School.

In Nov 2006, a referendum passed that provided nearly $71 million for updates and renovation to both Parker and Craig High Schools. Construction began in October 2007 and lasted two years.

== Athletics ==
The school sports teams compete in the Big Eight Conference. State level competition is governed by the Wisconsin Interscholastic Athletic Association (WIAA).

=== Baseball ===
- 1977 State champion; beat Middleton, 6-2

=== Basketball (boys) ===
- 1971 State champion; beat Milwaukee King, 79-68

=== Basketball (girls) ===
- 1993 State champion; beat Middleton, 58-40
- 2000 State champion; beat Hudson, 57-56
- 2001 State champion; beat Stevens Point 51-44

=== Conference affiliation history ===
- Big Eight Conference (1967-present)

== Notable alumni ==
- Mistie Bass, basketball player in the WNBA
- Steve Preston, administrator of the Small Business Administration, 2006-2008, and 14th Secretary of the U.S. Department of Housing and Urban Development (HUD), 2008-2009
- Terry Ryan, general manager of the Minnesota Twins
- Michael J. Sheridan, Wisconsin State Assembly
