= George Nelson Tremper =

American educator

George Nelson Tremper (May 30, 1877 – February 23, 1958) was an educator and principal of Kenosha High School from 1911 to 1944. Kenosha Tremper High School is named in his honor.

== Biography ==
=== Early life and education ===
George Nelson Tremper was born May 30, 1877, in Pontiac, Michigan. He married Metta Robins on September 19, 1901. After completing his education at the University of Michigan, the Trempers taught for three years in then unsettled Philippines. Following their return to America, Tremper taught in Franklin, Indiana, and later went on to become a principal in a Cincinnati high school. He also taught at the University of Illinois School of Education while he worked toward his master's degree.

=== Kenosha ===
Tremper and his wife then moved to Kenosha, Wisconsin, in 1911, where he headed a 13 faculty staff as the new principal of then Kenosha High School. The school had just 300 students. Tremper resigned as principal of Bradford in 1944.

Tremper joined the Kenosha Chapter of DeMolay, served as president of its council, was a member of the Scout Court of Honor, and was commissioner of Boy Scouts. He was also a member of the Kenosha County Historical Society, president of the Wisconsin Society, and was active in the Sons of the American Revolution.

He was county chairman of the Citizens Military Training Corps, active in the Rotary and Elks clubs, and chairman of the Kenosha County Civilian Aid Committee. Tremper died on February 23, 1958.

== Legacy ==
A contest was created for the name of the Kenosha high school built in 1964. It was named Tremper in honor of George Nelson Tremper.
