= Kathryn Morrison (politician) =

American politician

Kathryn Morrison (May 22, 1942 – June 30, 2013) was an American educator and Democratic Party politician who was the first woman to be elected to serve in the Wisconsin Senate. Morrison was born in Madison, Wisconsin, and graduated from Madison East High School. Morrison was elected November 1974, seated January 1975 and served one term representing the 17th District.

After leaving the Wisconsin State Senate Morrison pursued a career in health care administration with the United States Government, the New York City Health and Hospitals Corporation, and the March of Dimes. She published about the topic of health care economics. Morrison had a BA and MBA from the University of Wisconsin–Madison.

== Early life ==
Kathryn Morrison was born in Madison to parents Gould E. and Geraldine D. Morrison. She went through the Madison public school system, where she attended Lowell Grade School and Madison East High School. She decided to stay local for her higher education and earned her bachelor's and her master's degree in business administration both at UW-Madison, where she earned her M.B.A. in 1965.

== Early activism ==
At the time Morrison was elected to a seat in the Wisconsin Senate, she was an economics professor at the University of Wisconsin–Platteville. In the book, What Two Can Do: Sam & Mandy Stellman's crusade for social justice, the author discuss the events and political environment that led to Morrisons's decision to run for the Senate seat. Morrison was active in various progressive women's movements throughout the state, working closely with Mandy Stellman on numerous issues that plagued the state, including supporting the change to the language in Wisconsin state statutes and legislation to make them gender neutral. Hearings were held on October 19, 1973, to address this issue, and the committee was chaired by State Senator Gordon Roseleip, who Morrison would later run against and then defeat. Roseleip belittled Stellman and was against any attempts to change the terminology. The bill eventually got out of committee and passed by a wide margin, but that was one of many examples of Senator Roseleip fighting against any advancements of women in the state and politics. After Stellman's negative encounter with Roseleip in the committee hearings, Stellman and some of her esteemed peers in the women's rights movement, such as Gene Boyer, Midge Miller, Mary Lou Muntz, Barbara Ulichny, and Morrison, were eating at a restaurant on State Street to regroup after the difficult hearings. Their frustration with Roseleip led to their desire to rid him from office, and these women helped create the spark that would lead to Morrison later running for office. When she went back to the capitol to lobby for various women's rights issues, it was her looking at the male legislators and realizing that she could do it too. Watching the men legislate and hearing the encouragement from several of her peers provided Morrison with the confidence to run for state office to be the first female state senator.

=== Sexual Assault Act of 1976 ===
Before Morrison was a state senator, she was an associate professor of economics at the University of Wisconsin-Platteville. After she was elected, the Sexual Assault Act of 1976 was passed, but she was active in the women's liberation movement before she was elected, and helped lay the foundations for the eventual support of the Sexual Assault Act. In 1974, Morrison worked with Barbara Ulichny to organize a summit meeting for women in leadership positions throughout the state. Ulichny eventually was elected to the State Assembly in 1978, to the State Senate later, and then eventually became a private attorney. The women's summit's goal was to write the first draft for a new sexual assault law, and help push the legislation through many state congressional meetings and with important key players, including women that Morrison worked with such as Sandra Edhlund, Sara Bates, Julilly Kohler, and Linda Roberson. The Sexual Assault Law's plan was to move the state forward in terms of progressive legislation that would protect rape victims and close the loopholes in the previous laws. It broadened the definition of sexual assault by dividing it into four categories, such as touching without permission to forced intercourse. They wanted to have the punishment fit the crime, the previous law defined sexual assault only as rape, and the only legal punishment was 30 years. The women activists wanted these different levels of punishment, in order to reassure many male legislators and judges, who were reluctant to place a man behind bars for 30 years for a smaller crime. There was still rampant negative attitudes towards brushing off sexual assault cases that allowed many offenders to walk free, so their attempts to create this middle ground legislation gained a lot of supporters. The proposed law also included the provision to change the name "rape" to "sexual assault" in legal wordings, to be more all-encompassing and ensure more acts of sexual assault would be punished. Other aspects of the law that Morrison and other female activists supported was to put to rest the myth that unless a woman physically fought her attacker she consented to the sexual action, and they also wanted to ensure that if a woman had to testify or go through any legal proceedings that her previous sex life wouldn't also go on trial. Morrison and other activists held a public forum on September 23, 1974, at the University of Wisconsin-Milwaukee. Their efforts got the attention of many, but it still took a few years for the legislation to pass, later in 1976.

=== Morrison's election ===
She took a leave of absence from teaching at UW-Platteville in order to run for the Senate. Morrison decided to run for state senate in 1975, where she was elected to one term in the legislature, as a member of the Democratic party. She flipped the seat in what was a very Republican 17th Senate District when she was elected, and it was the first time in 82 years that the Democrats regained control of Wisconsin's higher chamber. Since Morrison's win the district is no longer considered super Republican. It was a very agricultural district in the western part of the state, but now there were some liberal streaks to the district that caused it to be a little unpredictable. Morrison was the first representative that was not a Republican to represent District 17 since S. J. Todd back in 1867, who was a member of the National Union Party. The first ever Democratic senator in that district was Philo White, back when Wisconsin was first established as a state back in 1848, and Morrison was the second Democrat ever to represent the district. She defeated incumbent Gordon Roseleip, a resident of Darlington, a vocal opponent of women's rights and one of the most conservative members of the State Senate, in order to win the seat. Roseleip was a staunch anti-communist, who was also very anti-birth control and pro-war, but his fame predominantly came from his famous blindfolded attempt to tell the difference between margarine and butter back in 1965, which failed. Roseleip, who previously had won by margins as large as 60 percent or more in all of his elections, attributed his lose to their differences in opinions on education, specifically when it came to funding. Since Morrison was a professor, her expertise on the subject brought her credibility over the state senator that had education low on his priorities. Morrison's platform included an economic focus while appealing to younger students and older seniors, so her unusual electorate plus her title of economics professor helped her win her election. Morrison had to overcome a lot of doubt directed towards her, as many conservatives agreed with Roseleip that Morrison shouldn't serve in the state senate. When Morrison was elected there weren't even women's bathrooms near the senate floor, but she ensured that at least one bathroom was converted to a women's bathroom.

== State Senate ==
Since her inauguration, there have been 18 women senators, as of 2003, 13 of whom had previously served in the assembly. Morrison was fairly liberal on most of her political stances, but her focus was on women's rights, and she helped pass multiple important bills that increased the rights women had over their economic affairs. Her most notable achievements include helping to pass laws such as the Farmland Preservation Act, plus an act that lowered the inheritance tax on both widows, specifically farm wives, and widowers, and also ensured that no-fault divorce in the state of Wisconsin would pass. She supported the expansion of funding for roads in her district, including enlarging Highway 18-151 that ran between Dodgeville and Mount Horeb. There was still much resistance towards equal rights for women, as she had to fight hard to keep 13 amendments from passing that attempted to dilute a broad gender equality bill that did end up passing in 1975. She ensured the passage of a bill that placed limits on court expenses, fees for attorneys, and court awards for medical malpractice lawsuits, despite major lobbying against her actions from doctors, insurance companies, lawyers, and various consumers. The Wisconsin Sexual Assault Act of 1976, a piece of legislation that she helped create while she was still a professor, passed during her time in the State Senate. The act passed with 30 votes to 1, and it was considered as the best piece of rape punishment legislation in the country, and inspired other states to reform their own laws as well Her business background helped make the Democratic Caucus's decision easy to elect Morrison became the first woman to be a part of the highly influential Joint Finance Committee in 1976 (Women in Wisconsin). 1976 was also the year that the Wisconsin State Journal awarded Morrison Woman of the Year in State Politics.

== Later career ==
Morrison ended up losing the 1978 election to Republican challenger Richard Kreul, a cattle and dairy farmer from Fennimore, Wisconsin. After her brief stint in the Wisconsin State Senate, she continued to work in government and politics, but no longer in public office. She was a part of the Carter administration by working in the U.S. Department of Health and Human Services, the Department of Housing and Urban Development, and was the Deputy Commissioner of the Department on Aging. After working for Carter, she came back to Wisconsin to work for the Wisconsin Regional Geriatrics Center in Milwaukee as an economics specialist, then later she became the administrator of the Wisconsin Division of Health in 1983. She continued to work in the healthcare field, and by 1987 Morrison had worked her way up to become the chief financial officer at New York City Health and Hospitals Corps., which oversaw the 17 public hospitals throughout New York City. She also dabbled in education, when she was an adjunt professor at New York University. In 1990 Morrison moved into the nonprofit sector, where she became senior vice president for finance and administration for the March of Dimes, a position she held until her retirement in 2004.

After leaving the Senate, she served for a time in the United States Department of Health and Human Services as a Deputy Commissioner of the Department on Aging, and was Administrator of the Division of Health in Wisconsin.

== New York City Health and Hospital Corporation ==
Morrison was the chief financial officer of the New York City Health and Hospital Corporation which runs the public hospital system in New York City.

== March of Dimes ==
Morrison was the Senior Vice President for Finance and Administration at the March of Dimes, a not for profit organization focused on preventing birth defects and infant mortality.

== Retirement ==
After she retired she devoted her time to her hobbies, such as reading, traveling all over the world, and collecting folk art. She also volunteered her time to be treasurer of the Transition Network—a network for women transiting to life after their careers.

== Death ==
She died after a long battle from breast cancer at Agrace HospiceCare Center in Fitchburg, Wisconsin, on June 30, 2013.

== Legacy ==
After Morrison died she was honored by many from all over the state for being the first woman in the State Senate and paving the way for other women to follow after her. University of Wisconsin-Platteville faculty and staff, various members of the community, and legislators from all over the state attended a ceremony in Morrison's honor on December 15, 2014. Notable people in attendance included Wisconsin State Senators Dale Schultz, Tim Cullen, and Fred Risser as well as former University of Wisconsin System President Katharine C. Lyall, a dear friend of Morrison's, as well as various members of her family. Held in the Nohr Gallery in Ullsvik Hall, a plaque memorializing her work was revealed during the ceremony. Morrison was well-remembered for her time in the Wisconsin State Senate and is included in various governmental and educational curriculums and programs, including the Wisconsin State Senate Scholar Program. Morrison is survived by two brothers, Phillip and his wife Pam who live in Mesa, Arizona, and Paul and his wife Lynn, who live in Fort Collins, Colorado; her nephews David Morrison, Scott Morrison, and Kenneth Morrison, and her niece, Valorie Smith She was interred in Wheeler in Dunn County at a private ceremony.

== Works ==
- Morrison, Kathryn, "Internal Budgeting at HHC" (1992) in Public hospital systems in New York and Paris. New York: New York University Press.
