= Malcolm Shabazz City High School =

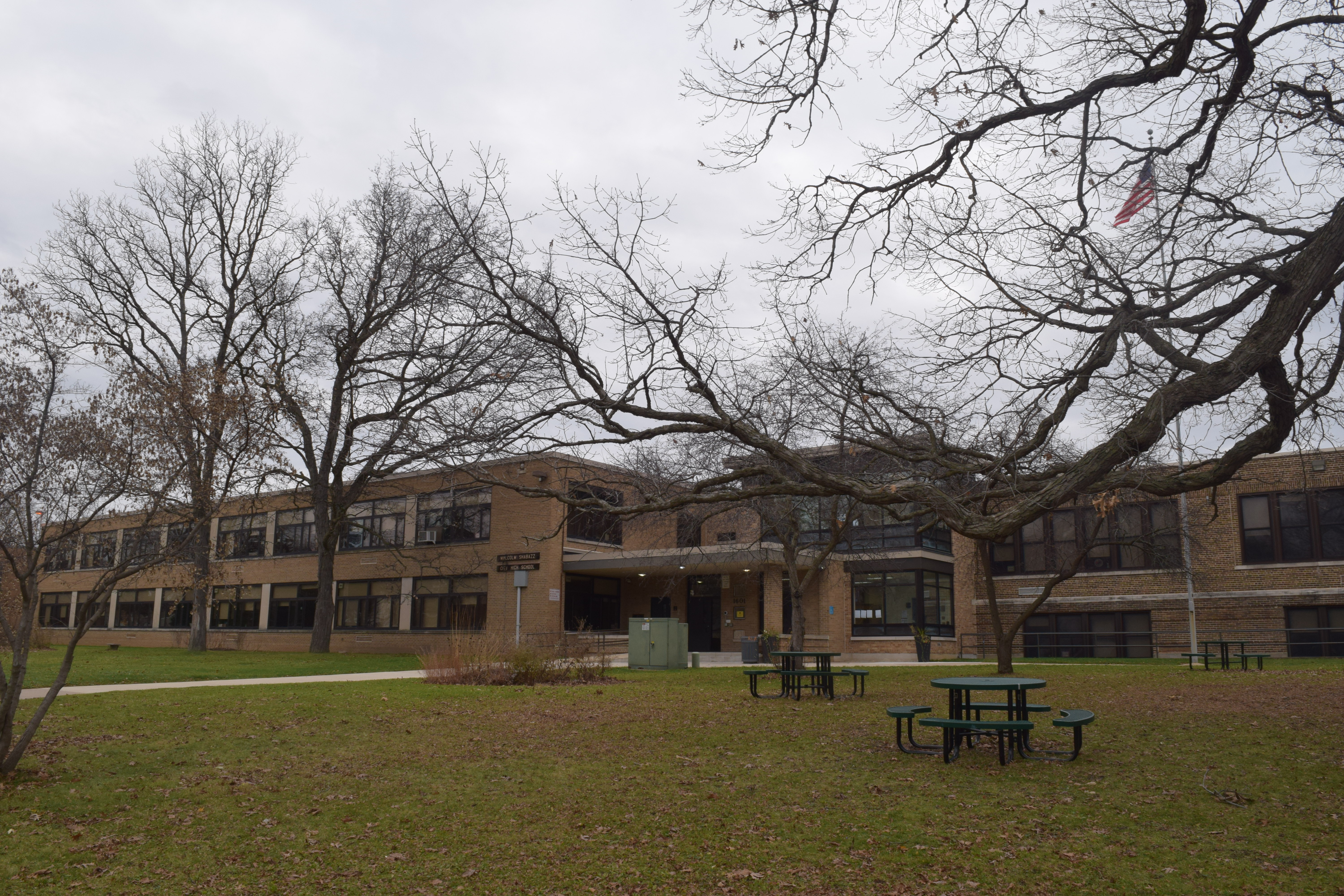

Location
- 1601 N Sherman Avenue; Madison, Wisconsin 53704; United States; 43.117756°N 89.362965°W

Information
- Type: Public secondary
- Established: 1971
- School district: Madison Metropolitan School District
- Principal: Nathan O'Shaughnessy
- Faculty: 12
- Grades: 9–12
- Enrollment: 114 (2023-2024)
- Website: shabazz.madison.k12.wi.us

Malcolm Shabazz City High School is a public high school in Madison, Wisconsin, United States. It was founded in 1971 as Malcolm Shabazz High School, changing its name in 1979 after merging with City High School which was founded 1972. Shabazz is one of six secondary schools in the Madison Metropolitan School District. It was named in honor of the activist Malcolm X, also known as Malcolm Shabazz.

Shabazz is known for its informal atmosphere (students refer to teachers and the principal by their first names) and emphasis on individuality and social and political activism. According to former a social studies teacher, Gene Delcourt, "Shabazz was designed to be an alternative school for the sake of it being an alternative school, rather than it being a last chance for diploma completion or the last chance for kids who were falling through the cracks. When the school was founded, it was originally founded by students who were motivated to learn something other than what mainstream schools were teaching. Teachers responded to that by teaching their passion."

== Admission ==
Students must apply for admission to Shabazz, with new students being accepted at the beginning of each semester.

== Academics ==
Shabazz operates on a semester schedule. It offers a varied selection of courses, including The First Amendment (social studies), science of global warming, rap as poetry (English), and American Sign Language. All new students are required to take an anti-discrimination social studies course called Mirrors.

Students at Shabazz have dual enrollment with their "home school" (neighborhood school within the Madison Metropolitan School District) and are eligible to take courses at both schools.

== Service-learning ==
Shabazz is a National Demonstration Site for Service Learning and is considered a "leader school" in the service-learning movement. Shabazz has presented at multiple national service learning conferences since 2000. Service-learning projects are incorporated into courses such as Road to Indian Country, a social studies class on contemporary Native Americans that involves a week-long service trip to the Pine Ridge Indian Reservation, or the Project Green Teen started in 2005) a series of classes "centered around the themes of understanding freshwater ecosystems and environmental restoration".

== Notable alumni ==
Logan Severson, lead singer of the band Disq, attended Shabazz City High School. Actor Skyler Davenport also attended Shabazz City High School.
