= Jerome I. Case High School =

Location
- 7345 Washington Ave. Racine, Wisconsin 53406; United States; 42°42′58″N 87°52′20″W

Information
- Type: Public secondary
- Established: 1966
- Principal: Cassie Kuranz
- Teaching staff: 129.80 (FTE)
- Grades: 9–12
- Enrollment: 1,845 (2023-2024)
- Student to teacher ratio: 14.21
- Colors: Green and gold
- Mascot: Casey the Eagle
- Newspaper: Just in Case
- Yearbook: Hesperian
- Website: https://www.rusd.org/o/chs

Jerome I. Case High School (also known as Case, J. I. Case or Racine Case High School) is located in Mount Pleasant, Wisconsin, a suburb of Racine in the United States. It is a public school for grades 9 to 12 with an estimated student enrollment of 2,022.

Built in 1966, Case was named for Jerome Increase Case, founder of Racine Threshing Works, now a part of CNH Global. Case students are divided into three academies: Business, Health Sciences, and Computer Science Education and Technical Services. The school mascot is "Casey the Eagle". The school is the first of ten authorized Wisconsin high schools to offer the International Baccalaureate program. In May 2015, Case earned the approval from IBO to become an IB Career Programme Candidate school. In May 2025, Case earned approval for IB Middle Years Programme (MYP). All Freshman and Sophomores at Case are now IB MYP students.

Case is an Academy of Racine, which is a program released by RUSD with hopes to give students the opportunity to become "College or career ready".

It serves residents of: Sturtevant, Mount Pleasant and sections of Caledonia.

== Athletics ==
Case won state championships in boys cross country in 1973, 1975 and 1989.

=== Conference affiliation history ===
- Big Eight Conference (1966-1970)
- South Shore Conference (1970-1980)
- Parkland Conference (1980-1983)
- Suburban Conference (1983-1985)
- Big Nine Conference (1985-1993)
- Southeast Conference (1993-present)

== Notable alumni ==
- Caron Butler, basketball player
- Duane Kuiper, Major League Baseball player and broadcaster
- Linda Leigh, botanist and Biosphere 2 crew member
- Samantha Logic, basketball player
- Jesse Marsch, former Major League Soccer player and current coach of the Canadian men's national soccer team
- Cory Mason, Mayor of Racine
- Kim Merritt - American long-distance runner
- Tom Sorensen - American volleyball player
