= Franklin County High School =

Franklin County High School may refer to:

- Franklin County High School (Florida), Eastpoint, Florida
- Franklin County High School (Georgia), Carnesville, Georgia
- Franklin County High School (Idaho), Preston, Idaho - Preston School District
- Franklin County High School (Indiana), Brookville, Indiana
- Franklin County High School (Kentucky), Frankfort, Kentucky
- Franklin County High School (Mississippi), Meadville, Mississippi
- Franklin County High School (Tennessee), Winchester, Tennessee
- Franklin County High School (Rocky Mount, Virginia), Rocky Mount, Virginia

== See also ==
- Franklin High School (disambiguation)
