= Archie Simonson =

American judge (1924–2018)

- Simonson in 1977

Dane County judge
- In office September 15, 1972 – September 7, 1977
- Preceded by: Russell J. Mittelstadt
- Succeeded by: Moria Krueger

Personal details
- Spouse: Edel-Lore Schultz (m. 1949–2011)
- Children: 4

Archie Evans Simonson (December 25, 1924 – June 15, 2018) was an American lawyer and jurist who served as a judge in the Dane County Circuit Court, Wisconsin from 1972 to 1977. Simonson was recalled in a judicial recall election following his ruling on a 1977 rape case where he sentenced a 15-year-old boy who had raped a 16-year-old female schoolmate to probation, stating that "given the way women dress, rape is a normal reaction", and that "whether women like it or not, they are sex objects". Following the recall election, Simonson was replaced by 33-year old lawyer Moria Krueger, who became the first female judge in Dane County.

== Early life ==
Simonson was born in Baraboo, Wisconsin on December 25, 1924. He was raised in Richmond, Indiana, graduating from high school in 1943. The same year he was drafted into the United States Army and served in New Guinea during World War II. Following a medical discharge from the army in 1946, Simonson returned to Wisconsin and studied business and law at the University of Wisconsin–Madison, graduating in 1952. Simonson was a member of the University of Wisconsin fencing team and became the team's head coach in 1951, a position he held until he was elected as Dane County Judge in 1972 and retired from coaching. Simonson also served as vice chairman of the United States Fencing Association for the 1972 Summer Olympics. In 1949, Simonson married Edel-Lore Schultz; the couple had four children.

== Legal career ==
After graduating law school, Simonson worked as an associate in a law firm, before forming his own firm of Smith and Simonson with fellow attorney William Bradford Smith in 1957. He served as an alderman in the 11th ward of the Madison Common Council from 1953 to 1955. Simonson ran for election as the Dane County Circuit Court judge in the April 4, 1972, elections, against the incumbent, Russell J. Mittelstadt. He won by over 10,000 votes.

Simonson drew national attention in 1977 when on May 25 he sentenced a 15-year-old boy to one year of house arrest after being found guilty (along with two other 15-year-old boys) of raping a 16-year-old female schoolmate in a stairwell at Madison West High School. In his sentencing remarks, Simonson stated that "given the way women dress, rape is a normal reaction", and that "whether women like it or not, they are sex objects". These statements drew the attention of feminist groups such as the local Rape Crisis Centre, and the National Organization for Women (NOW). On May 26, a small protest took place outside the courthouse by feminists, which was covered in national newspapers. During this protest a number of women spoke to Simonson, seeking an explanation for his remarks. When he doubled down on his beliefs, the women decided that they would seek to remove Simonson from his position through the judicial recall process, something that had never before occurred in the history of the state. A number of prominent individuals and organisations soon voiced criticism of Simonson's remarks, such as a number of faculty members of the University of Wisconsin Law School, the Wisconsin Civil Liberties Union, and state senator Timothy Cullen. Folk singer Malvina Reynolds wrote a song, "The Judge Said", in protest of the statements. The recall campaign was led by feminist activists, primarily from local chapters of organisations such as the NOW, the Women's International League for Peace and Freedom, and the Democratic Party. Campaigners were at one point accused of racism after it was revealed that the three assailants in the case were black, and the victim white. This led some, such as The Capital Times, a local paper that had been in favour of recall, and the president of the local NAACP to distance themselves from the recall petition and simply demand an apology from Simonson instead. Protestors argued against these views by stating that the races of the juveniles involved had not been publicly known when the protests began and that the point of contention was not the sentencing, but Simonson's statements. Simonson requested that the transcript of the sentencing be released, believing this would sway public opinion to his side. It had the opposite effect, revealing to the public further comments he had made regarding women's dress in his court and the availability of sex in Madison. These comments, and his continued statements attempting to discredit local feminists and the NOW, led only to increased public support for his recall.

The recall petition was successful; it required 21,000 valid signatures from Dane County residents and received 35,319. Local attorney Moria Krueger, who had been active in supporting the recall petition and previously had expressed her willingness to seek election as judge, announced that she would stand in the recall election. She was endorsed by the Dane County Women's Political Caucus. Elections were held on the September 7, 1977. Simonson stood for re-election, against Krueger and four other candidates. He was unsuccessful, coming second with 18,435 votes to Krueger's 27,244.

== Later life and death ==
After the special election, Simonson returned to practicing law. He remained adamant that "there is a link between a permissive society and sex crimes" and that he did not have regrets about his statements. In 1984, jailed serial killer and white supremacist Joseph Paul Franklin admitted to the police that he had murdered an interracial couple in Madison in 1977, claiming that he had been in the city with the purpose of assassinating Simonson, because of his lenient sentencing of the black defendants in the rape case. Simonson stated he was unaware of the supposed plans. Simonson retired from practicing law in 2000. He died on June 15, 2018.
