= Bradford Community Church =

Historic church in Wisconsin, United States

- Boys and Girls Library
- U.S. National Register of Historic Places
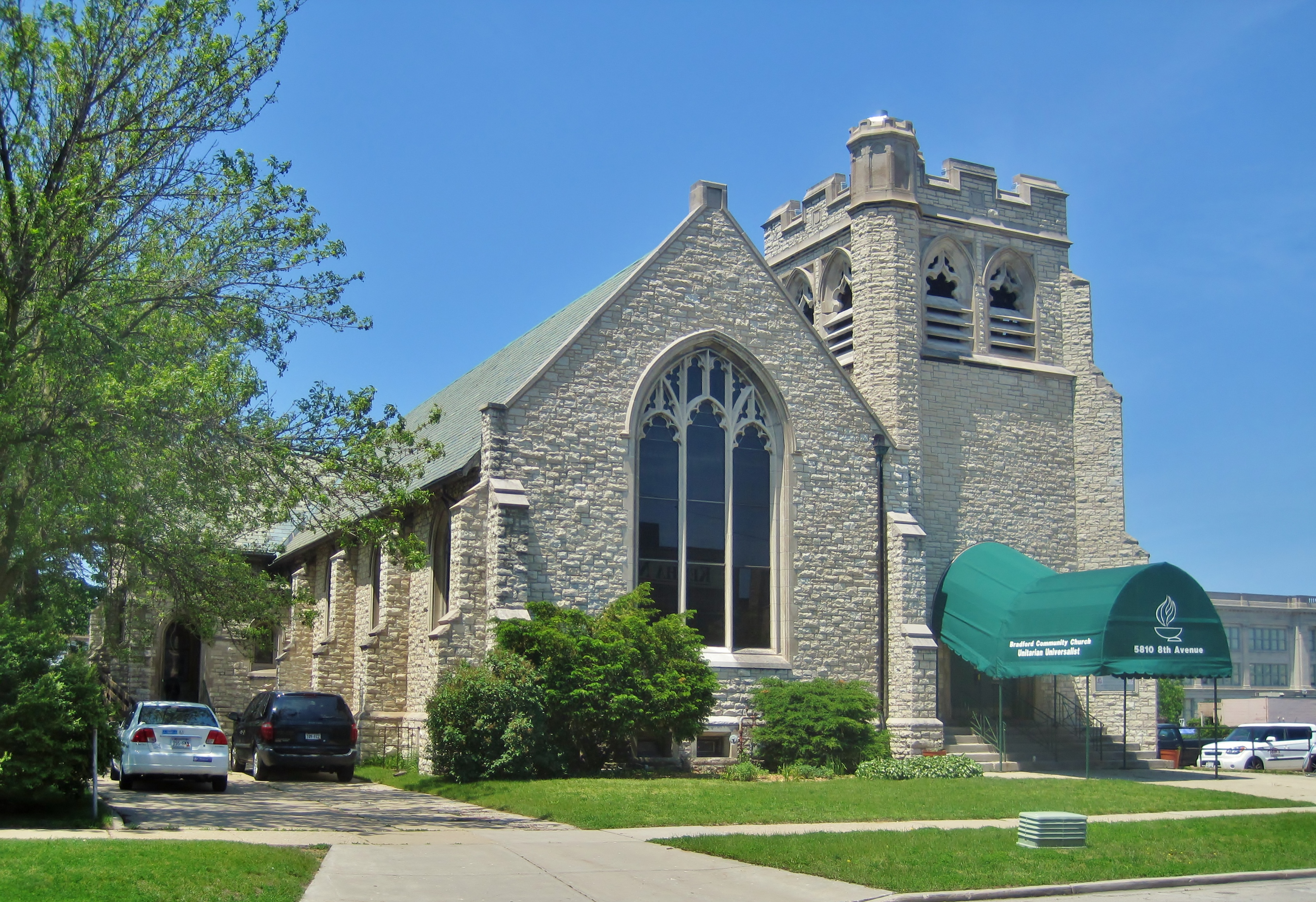

- Location within Wisconsin Location within the United States
- Location: 5810 8th Ave., Kenosha, Wisconsin
- Coordinates: 42°34′57″N 87°49′14″W
- Area: less than one acre
- Built: 1907
- Architect: N. Max Dunning
- Architectural style: Gothic Revival
- NRHP reference No.: 80000144
- Added to NRHP: October 24, 1980

The Bradford Community Church, originally the Henry M. Simmons Memorial Church and later the Boys and Girls Library, is a historic church built in 1907 in Kenosha, Wisconsin, United States under the leadership of Kenosha's first woman pastor.

== History ==
The Henry M. Simmons Memorial Church was built in 1907 for pastor Florence Buck. Buck was ordained at the Meadville Theological School in Chicago, Illinois and came to Kenosha, Wisconsin to preach in 1901. She was the first woman to have a ministry in Kenosha and was involved in the design of the church. Buck was later named the acting director of the Department of Religious Education for the American Unitarian Association. The building was designed by N. Max Dunning, a Kenosha native.

In 1929, the church was purchased by the city of Kenosha. It was converted into the "Boys and Girls Library," for the youth of the community, and was dedicated on April 12, 1929 as the first dedicated children's library in the state and the third in the country. Closed in 1979 after five decades of service, the city then sold the building to a private developer, beginning a period where it was used for various restaurants and bars. On October 24, 1980, the building was recognized by the National Park Service with a listing on the National Register of Historic Places. The Kenosha Chapter of the Unitarian Universalist Church purchased the building in 1993, restoring it to the Unitarian Universalist Association. It was renamed the Bradford Community Church after Mary D. Bradford, an educational reformer who was also a leader in the original congregation, and after whom one of Kenosha's public high schools was also named.

In 2020, the adjoining car lot was burned during the Kenosha unrest.

== Architecture ==
The church was designed in the Gothic Revival style. The limestone building sits on a differently-coursed limestone foundation. The main building has a prominent water table. The northeast corner of the church features a crenelated square tower. The double-door entrance, centered on the tower on the main facade, is in a pointed arch with stone molding. The rest of the building is a gable-roofed nave. The main facade of this gable features a large decorative leaded glass window. A small organ room was built on the north side of the building; this room was later used as a chapel and now serves as the minister's office and library.
