= Madison East High School =

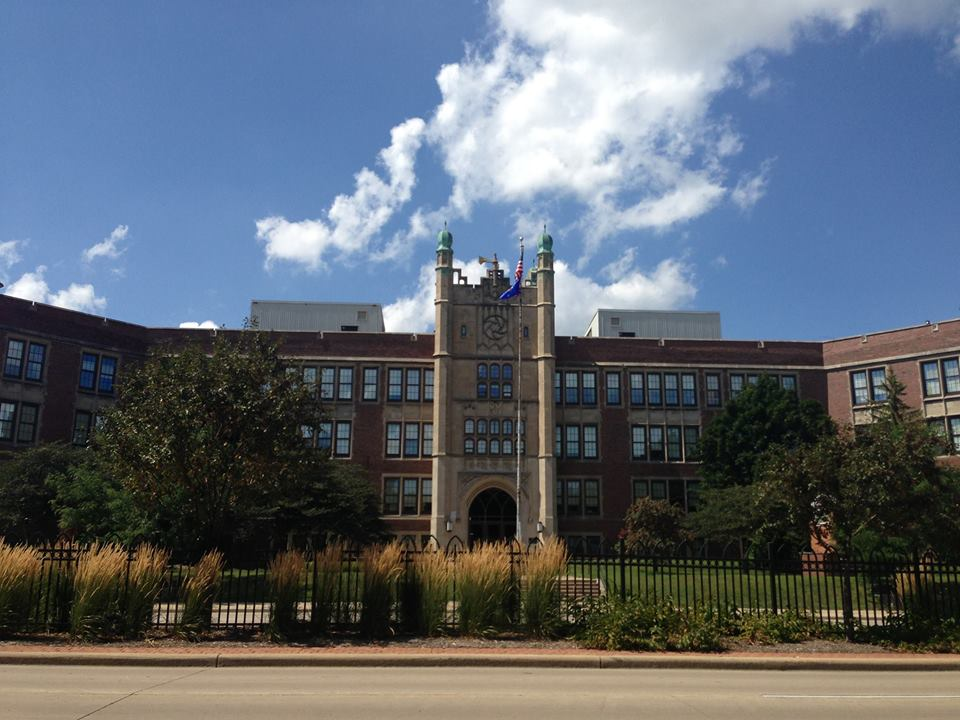

Location
- 2222 E Washington Ave; Madison, Wisconsin 53704; United States; 43.09745°N 89.35419°W

Information
- Type: Public secondary
- Motto: Diversity and Pride
- Established: 1922
- Oversight: Madison Metropolitan School District (MMSD)
- Principal: Patrice Haste
- Teaching staff: 108.80 (FTE)
- Grades: 9–12
- Enrollment: 1,784 (2026-2027)
- Student to teacher ratio: 15.11
- Color
- Athletics conference: Big 8
- Mascot: Peppy the Purgolder
- Rival: La Follette High School
- Accreditation: AdvancED
- Newspaper: Tower Times
- Website: East High School

Madison East High School is a public high school on the east side of Madison, Wisconsin, United States. It was established in 1922, making it the oldest operating public high school in Madison, and is one of six secondary schools in the Madison Metropolitan School District. The school mascot is "Peppy the Purgolder", an animal resembling a feline. Madison East athletes compete in the WIAA Big Eight Conference.

== Facility ==
Madison East was built by architect Frank Riley in 1922, in the Collegiate Gothic style. Since it was first built, four additions to the school have been constructed, in 1925, 1932, 1938-1939 and 1962–1963. Madison East has an inside mall, which was built from bricks from the older building before the school was expanded. This area houses most of the lockers in the school and serves as a place for students to congregate. The forum is normally reserved for freshman, but upperclassmen are also allowed to use it. Above the freshman forum is the "Sophomore Wall"; closer to the cafeteria are the "Junior" and "Senior" walls. In 2017, the Madison East theater underwent a major renovation, costing $4.7 million and radically changing the school's main performing arts space. Beginning in 2022, East underwent major renovations as part of a 2020 referendum.

== Academics ==
Honors and advanced classes are part of the curriculum. As of the 2026-27 school year, the Advanced Placement (AP) courses include:

AP Classes offered by category
English	Science	Social Studies	Mathematics	World Language and Other
English Language and Composition	Physics (1, 2 and C)	World History	Precalculus	French Language
English Literature and Composition	Biology	US Government & Politics	Calculus AB	Spanish Language
Seminar (AP Capstone )	Chemistry	US History	Calculus BC	Music Theory
Research (AP Capstone)	Environmental Science	African American Studies	Statistics	
		European History		

The school also has a music program. The band program includes Freshman Band, Concert Band, Pep Band, Jazz Band, Jazz Orchestra and the highest level, Sinfonietta. The orchestra program includes the Concert Orchestra, the Symphony Orchestra and the Philharmonic Orchestra. The choir program has both concert choirs and show choirs. The concert choirs include Chorale, Treble Choir and Concert Choir. The school no longer sports a show choir, though Cypher is a student-driven arts group that performs in local spaces.

== Extracurricular activities ==
=== Athletics ===
East's sports include softball, volleyball, football, baseball, track and field, soccer, tennis, golf, gymnastics, wrestling, cross country, cheerleading, basketball, ice hockey, swimming, and ultimate frisbee.

==== Conference affiliation history ====
- Big Six Conference (1925–1929)
- Big Seven Conference (1929–1930)
- Big Eight Conference (1930–present)

=== Theater ===
The Margaret Williams Theater in East High School once had enormous chandelier. However, in the 1970s, the theater was renovated and the back was walled up to allow for the creation of the Barrett and Randall rooms as study halls. The chandelier was removed and the theater's seats were replaced with desks for more study halls. The theater was renovated in 2017. This renovation included the construction of a new balcony, and made the theater fully handicap-accessible.

Madison East High has a student theater program called the Eastside Players.

== Notable alumni ==
- Melissa Agard (Class of '87), Wisconsin State Legislator
- Andrea Arlington, model, television personality, life coach, and minister
- Connie Carpenter-Phinney (class of '75), professional cycle racer/speed skater and 1984 Summer Olympics Gold Medalist
- Michael Cole (actor), (class of '58), actor best known for his work on the television series The Mod Squad
- Dale Hackbart (class of '56), NFL linebacker/safety, Green Bay Packers (1960), Washington Redskins (1961–1963), Minnesota Vikings (1966–1970), St. Louis Cardinals (1971–1972), Denver Broncos (1973)
- Donald Hayes, (class of '94) NFL wide receiver, Carolina Panthers (1998–2001, 2004), New England Patriots (2002–2003)
- Gabe Jennings, (class of '97) middle-distance runner who competed in the 1,500 meters at the 2000 Sydney Olympics
- Jerry Kelly (class of '85), professional golfer, Nike Tour (1995), PGA Tour (1996-current)
- Konrad Bates Krauskopf (1910–2003), geologist
- Joe Kurth, NFL tackle, Green Bay Packers (1933–1934)
- Greg Mattison, NFL and NCAA football coach
- Jim Montgomery (class of '73), swimmer and gold medalist at the 1976 Summer Olympics
- Kathryn Morrison, legislator
- Pat Richter (class of '59), NFL tight end, Washington Redskins (1963–1970), University of Wisconsin–Madison Athletic Director (1989–2004)
- Kelda Roys, Wisconsin State Legislator
- Ken Starch, NFL running back, Green Bay Packers (1976)
- Bob Suter, (class of '75) 1980 "Miracle on Ice" Hockey Team Olympic Gold Medalist, professional hockey player
- Gary Suter, (class of '82) 2002 Hockey Team Olympic Silver Medalist, professional hockey player
- Louis Jolyon West, psychiatrist
- Bradley Whitford (class of '77), actor, most well known for his work on the television series The West Wing
- Eric Hovde (class of '82) Banking executive, American businessman, candidate for 2024 Senate (Republican)
