= Franklin Middle School =

Franklin Middle School is the name of many middle schools, usually named after Benjamin Franklin, including:

- Franklin Middle School (Long Beach, California)
- Franklin Middle School (Vallejo, California)
- Franklin Middle School (Pocatello, Idaho)
- Franklin Middle School (Champaign, Illinois)
- Franklin Middle School (Springfield, Illinois)
- Franklin Middle School (Wheaton, Illinois)
- Franklin Middle School (Baltimore, Maryland)
- Franklin Middle School (Cedar Rapids, Iowa)
- Franklin Middle School (Nutley, New Jersey)
- Franklin Middle School (Franklin Township, New Jersey)
- Franklin Middle School (Somerset, New Jersey)
- Franklin Middle School (Dallas, Texas)
- Franklin Middle School (Chantilly, Virginia)
- Franklin Middle School (Yakima, Washington)
- Franklin Middle School (Green Bay, Wisconsin)
- Franklin Middle School (Janesville, Wisconsin)
- Franklin Middle School(Wayne, Michigan)
