= Madison West High School =

Public secondary school in Madison, Wisconsin, United States

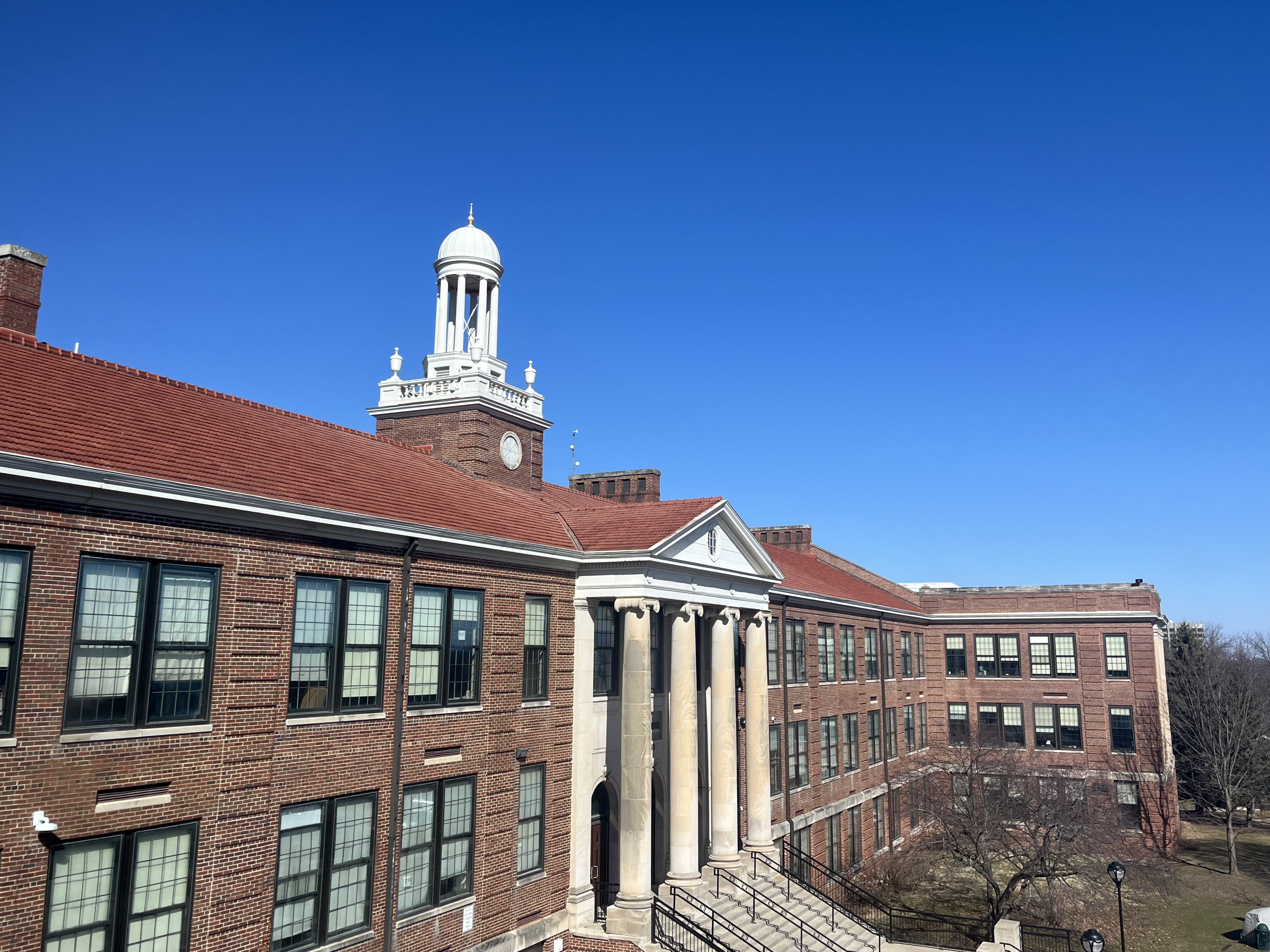

Location
- 30 Ash Street; Madison (MMSD), Wisconsin 53726; United States; 43°4′7″N 89°25′33″W

Information
- Type: Public secondary
- Established: 1930
- School district: Madison Metropolitan School District MMSD
- Principal: Daniel Kigeya
- Teaching staff: 137.30 (FTE)
- Grades: 9–12
- Enrollment: 2,222 (2024–2025)
- Student to teacher ratio: 16.18:1
- Colors: Maize and blue
- Athletics conference: Big Eight Conference
- Mascot: Reggie the Regent (lions)
- Teams: Regents
- Accreditation: AdvancED
- Newspaper: The Regent Review
- Yearbook: Westward Ho
- Website: west.madison.k12.wi.us

Madison West High School is a public high school on the west side of Madison, Wisconsin, United States. It was founded in 1930 and is one of six secondary schools in the Madison Metropolitan School District. It serves students from Madison, Shorewood Hills, and Fitchburg.

Located near the University of Wisconsin–Madison and the Wisconsin State Capitol, the school was rated "Exceeds Expectations" on the 2024–2025 School Report Card by the Wisconsin Department of Public Instruction. Its athletic teams, known as the Regents, compete in the WIAA Big Eight Conference.

== History ==
=== 20th century ===
Established in 1930, Madison West High School began as a junior-senior high before becoming a four-year high school in the 1960s. The building is an example of Collegiate Gothic Revival architecture, featuring pointed arches, stonework, and ornamental detailing. At the time of its construction, the school was located at the western edge of Madison, inspiring its name. In the early 20th century, Madison's only public high school was located downtown on the isthmus. A second school, East High School, opened in 1924 on the far east side. As western neighborhoods such as Nakoma, Wingra Park, and Westmorland grew, the school board selected the Carpenter farm on Regent Street for a new high school. The site, bordered by Highland Avenue at the city limits, was controversial. On April 22, 1924, the Capital Times reported that board member E.E. Brossard opposed the location, citing concerns that Madison would not expand far enough west for the site to be considered central.

Fifty-seven alumni from the classes of 1931 to 1944 are recognized as Gold Star alumni, having sacrificed their lives in military service for the United States in World War II.

In 1977, three fifteen-year-old boys were found guilty of raping a sixteen-year-old girl in a stairwell at the school. The rapists were given lenient sentences, with judge Archie Simonson stating that "given the way women dress, rape is a normal reaction", and that "whether women like it or not, they are sex objects". These statements drew national outrage, and Dane County voted to remove him via the judicial recall process, which had never before been done in Wisconsin.

=== 21st century ===
In October 2019, a Black security assistant was terminated after using a racial slur while advising a student not to use it. The incident prompted student protests, and the staff member was subsequently reinstated.

In 2020, MMSD implemented a policy setting 50% as the minimum grade for assignments, including those that were not turned in. Critics raised concerns about grade inflation and its effects on academic preparedness. From 2021 to 2024, the MMSD school board also considered removing honors classes, though the proposal was not adopted following community opposition.

In 2020, Madison voters approved a $317 million referendum to improve school facilities across the district. These renovations aimed to address overcrowding and accommodate a projected student population of 2,200. As part of this plan, extensive renovations began at West High in summer 2022 and were completed in the fall of 2024. The renovation included a new pool and gym with updated locker rooms, new classrooms and team rooms, and integrated wrestling and weight training facilities. Other additions include a library media center, expanded science labs, a welcome center, and a four-story accessibility addition to connect all school levels.

In April 2021, the conservative Wisconsin Institute for Law and Liberty threatened to sue both Madison West and the MMSD following virtual discussions on race (following the Derek Chauvin trial verdict) where parents were divided into groups for "white parents" and "parents of color," as noted in school emails. In response, the district apologized for the "poorly worded message" and noted that students and families themselves had requested the separate affinity groups.

== Academics ==
=== School Ranking ===
Scope	Niche	US News & World Report
District	N/A	1
Metro Area	2	3
State	12	24
Nation	983	997

West High School has at times produced more National Merit Scholarship semifinalists and finalists than any other high school in Wisconsin.

=== Advanced Placement (AP) Offerings ===
Madison West offers 20 AP courses.

=== Postsecondary Enrollment ===
In 2022, 78% of West High School graduates planned to immediately enroll in a postsecondary institution: 58% in a four-year college or university, 19% in a two-year college, and 1% in the military.

== Extracurriculars ==
Madison West High School offers 101 extracurricular organizations and activities, alongside 21 interscholastic sports. Prominent academic competitive clubs with strong records in local, state, national, and international tournaments include:

- FBLA Future Business Leaders of America
- DECA (formerly Distributive Education Clubs of America)
- HOSA Future Health Professionals
- Mock Trial
- Math Team (offers exams for AMC 8, AMC 10, AMC 12, AIME, USAMO/USAJMO, and IMO)
- National Speech & Debate Association (NSDA): Forensics Team, and Debate Team are separate clubs under NSDA.
- Rocket Club
- Science Olympiad

=== Math Team ===
The Madison West Math Team took first place in the 2015 state math meet. In 2016, they took first in the state math meet, the Wisconsin Math League, and the International Online "Purple Comet! Math Meet" for Wisconsin (20th in the U.S.).

=== Rocket Club ===
The Madison West Rocket Club was founded in 2003 by freshman Thomas Hanzlik. The club won the national Team America Rocketry Challenge (TARC) in 2009, 2012, and 2019, and represented the U.S. in international competition. In 2020, the club launched Project Ariadne, sending slime mold into suborbital flight to study its behavior in microgravity, as part of the NASA Student Launch Challenge. In 2025, the club won first place in the Rockets for Schools Class 2 and Class 1 Senior divisions.

=== Science Olympiad ===
Founded in 1985, the Madison West Science Olympiad team placed in the national top 10 for three consecutive years from 1989 to 1991, finishing 2nd in 1989. The team has earned earned 20 state titles, 19 runner-up finishes, and 27 national appearances; recently, its achievements have included notable 7th and 4th place national finishes in 2025 and 2026 respectively, and a high degree of success in physics and build events.

=== Athletic conference affiliation history ===
- Big Eight Conference (1930–present)

== Historical archives ==
The school, in partnership with Advantage Archives, digitized its 2,414 pages of the West High Times (1930–1962) and 14,105 pages of yearbooks (1933–2020).

== Notable alumni ==
- Jim Bakken – former NFL place kicker, St. Louis Cardinals
- Drake Baldwin – MLB catcher
- Tammy Baldwin – U.S. representative and U.S. senator
- Carol A. Buettner – Wisconsin state senator
- Alex Compton – former Philippine Basketball Association player and head coach
- Jeff Conrad – drummer for the band Phantom Planet
- Jim Doyle, class of 1963 – 44th governor of Wisconsin
- Reece Gaines – former NBA guard, Orlando Magic, Houston Rockets, Milwaukee Bucks
- Alexander R. Grant – Wisconsin state representative
- Olin Hacker – professional track and field athlete
- Beth Heiden – Olympic bronze medalist speed skater in the 1980 Winter Olympic Games; professional cyclist
- Eric Heiden – Olympic gold medalist speed skater at the 1980 Winter Olympic Games; professional cyclist
- Phil Hellmuth – professional poker player
- Francesca Hong - member of the Wisconsin Assembly and 2026 candidate for governor of Wisconsin.
- Dan Immerfall – Olympic speed skater at 1976 Winter Olympic Games, 1980 Winter Olympic Games
- Daniel Kane – mathematician; Morgan Prize (2007), Putnam Fellow (2003–2006)
- Peter Koechley – co-founder of Upworthy
- Fred Lerdahl – composer and music theorist
- Awonder Liang – chess player, third youngest American to qualify for the title of Grandmaster
- Barbara Lorman – Wisconsin state senator
- Denny Love – actor
- David Maraniss – journalist and author
- K. T. McFarland – deputy national security advisor
- Dalia Mogahed – Director of Research at the Institute for Social Policy and Understanding
- Ward Moorehouse – anti-corporate activist, publisher
- Jay Mortenson – Olympic gold medalist in swimming in 1988
- Cyrus Nowrasteh – filmmaker
- Sarayu Rao – actress
- John Reynolds – actor and writer
- Sarah T. Roberts – researcher
- David L. Rose – business executive
- Leo Sidran – musician
- Charles P. Smith – Wisconsin state treasurer
- John Stamstad – bike racer and trail runner, member of the Mountain Bike Hall of Fame
- Scott Stantis – editorial cartoonist for The Chicago Tribune and creator of the comic strips The Buckets and Prickly City
- Tim Stracka – former NFL tight end, Cleveland Browns
- Mike Sui – actor
- Chris Tallman – actor
- Donnel Thompson – former NFL linebacker, Pittsburgh Steelers, Indianapolis Colts
- Tim Van Galder – former NFL quarterback, St. Louis Cardinals
- Stu Voigt – former NFL tight end, Minnesota Vikings
- J.D. Walsh – actor
- Marc Webb – film director
- Bob Whitsitt – general manager of the Portland Trail Blazers and the Seattle SuperSonics in the NBA; the Seattle Seahawks in the NFL
- Ben Wikler – chair of the Democratic Party of Wisconsin
