= Mary D. Bradford High School =

- Rowdy the Red Devil

Location
- 3700 Washington Road; Kenosha, Wisconsin 53144; United States
- Coordinates: 42.60404°N 87.85458°W

Information
- School type: Public High School
- Established: 1845; 181 years ago
- School district: Kenosha Unified School District
- Principal: Jered J. Kotarak
- Teaching staff: 85.03 (FTE)
- Grades: 9–12
- Enrollment: 1,448 (2023–2024)
- Student to teacher ratio: 17.03
- Colors: Cardinal and black
- Mascot: Rowdy the Red Devil
- Website: Bradford High School

Bradford High School is a high school located in Kenosha, Wisconsin, United States, that serves students in grades 9 to 12. It is the main high school for students on the north side of the city.

== History ==
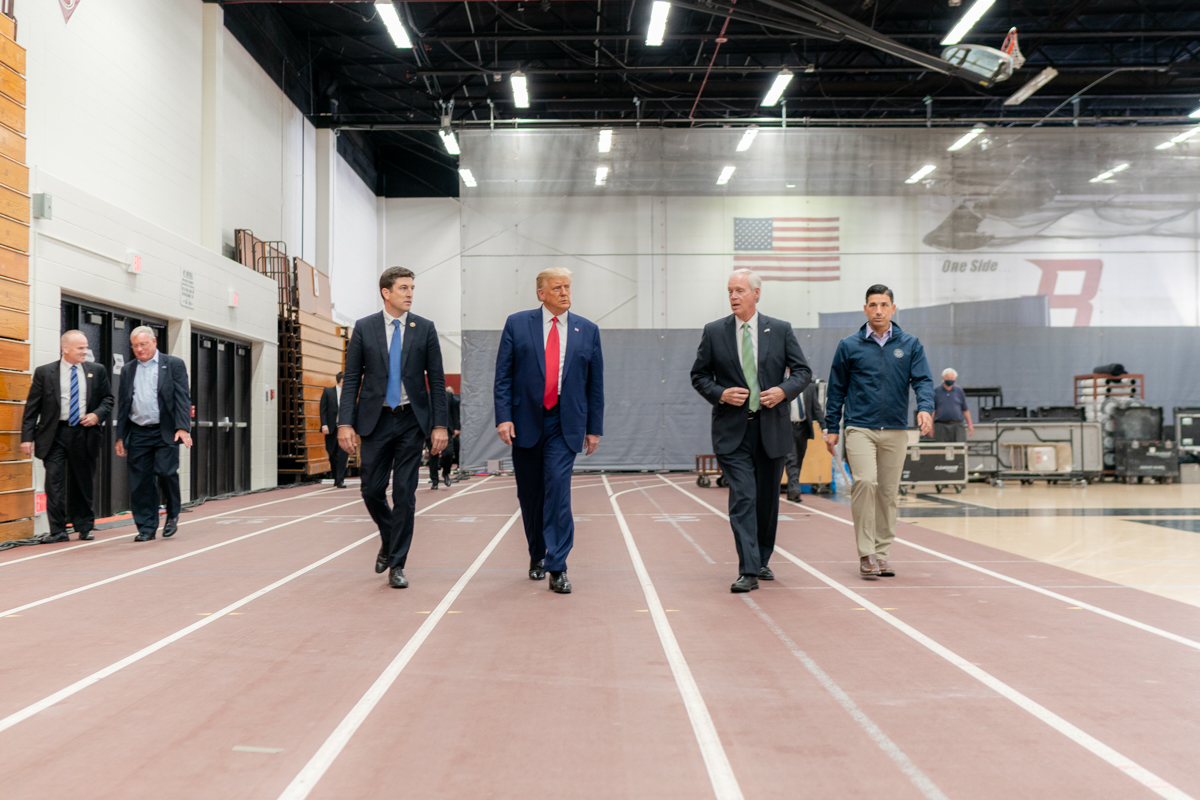
U.S. President Trump at Mary D. Bradford High School, 2020

Bradford High School was named after Mary D. Bradford, who was superintendent of schools for the Kenosha school system from 1878 to 1894, and again from 1910 to 1921. The former Mary Davison was born in Kenosha County in 1856 and graduated from Oshkosh Normal School in 1876, after which she taught at Kenosha High School from 1876 to 1878. She became a member of the board of visitors of the Milwaukee Normal School in 1892, joined the new faculty of Stevens Point Normal in 1894, the Stout Institute in 1906, and Whitewater State Normal in 1909, where she worked for one year before returning to Kenosha. She retired in 1921 after 45 years in education. Bradford died in Kenosha in 1943 at the age of 87.

The original high school building was built in 1849 and housed "all the children who attended public school classes in the town, from first grade up" but was deemed inadequate by 1890, and a second iteration of the high school opened in 1891, situated on the site of a former grade school. It was poorly constructed and by 1910 the auditorium and assembly hall portions of the building had been condemned.

The third iteration, that became the original Mary D. Bradford High School building, was built in 1924 and is located at Sheridan Road and 57th Street. The building took three years to complete, opening in 1927. The school eventually expanded into the former high school building, which became the Mary D. Bradford High School Annex. This building was razed in 1980. In 1975, the Kenosha Unified School Board purchased the former University of Wisconsin-Extension Center located at 39th Avenue and Washington Road, which had been built in 1961, with an addition in 1965. A major addition was constructed to the building in 1979 which included all of the components of a contemporary high school. In 1980, the Bradford building located on Sheridan Road was vacated and the building on 39th Avenue and Washington Road became the new Mary D. Bradford High School. At the same time, Reuther Central High School, which had been housed at the UW-Extension Center, moved into the Bradford building downtown, and remains a school in the Kenosha Unified School District.

Since Bradford High School moved to the Washington Road location, two soccer fields have been added north of the school, a varsity baseball stadium has been created to the northeast, and three practice American football fields have been created north of the ravine. A successful referendum in 2005 gave the school a new weight room and renovations and expansions to the locker rooms and further renovations to the indoor athletic facilities.

A 2015 referendum gave the school its first home football stadium, with the tennis courts and soccer fields moving to the Bullen Middle School site to make room for the stadium.

On September 1, 2020, President Donald Trump visited the school following a period of violence and unrest in the city.

== Athletics ==
Bradford competes in WIAA in Division 1. The school has been a member of the WIAA Southeast Conference and has been in a cross-town rivalry with Tremper High School since 1964, and Indian Trail High School and Academy since 2012

=== Teams ===
- Boys' American football
- Boys' basketball
- Girls' basketball
- Baseball
- Softball
- Cheerleading
- Dance team
- Boys' cross country
- Girls' cross country
- Boys' gymnastics
- Ice Hockey
- Boys' golf
- Girls' golf
- Girls' gymnastics
- Boys' soccer
- Girls' soccer
- Girls' softball
- Boys' swimming
- Girls' swimming
- Boys' tennis
- Girls' tennis
- Boys' track and field
- Girls' track and field
- Boys' volleyball
- Girls' volleyball
- Girls' lacrosse
- Wrestling

==== Athletic conference affiliation history ====
- Big Six Conference (1925-1929)
- Big Seven Conference (1929-1930)
- Big Eight Conference (1930-1970)
- South Shore Conference (1970-1980)
- Braveland Conference (1980-1983)
- Milwaukee Area Conference (1983-1985)
- Big Nine Conference (1985-1993)
- Southeast Conference (1993–present)

== Notable alumni ==
- Alan Ameche, Heisman Trophy winner, NFL rookie of the year 1955
- Joseph F. Andrea, Wisconsin State Senate
- Tom Braatz, former NFL player and Executive
- Joe Cerne, former NFL player
- Jeff Cohen, professional basketball player
- Eugene Dorff, Wisconsin State Assembly
- Gene Englund, basketball player for Wisconsin 1941 national champions
- Melvin Gordon, Denver Broncos running back, #15 pick in 2015 NFL draft
- Alfred C. Grosvenor, Wisconsin State Assembly
- Brock Lampe, New England Patriots Fullback, Signed with the New England Patriots as a Undrafted Free Agent on May 9, 2025
- Al Molinaro, actor, Happy Days
- Phil Pettey, former NFL player and coach
- Mark Pocan, Wisconsin State Assembly, U.S. House of Representatives
- Augie Schmidt, baseball player and coach
- Elga Meta Shearer, educator
- Charles Siebert, actor
- Daniel J. Travanti, actor, Hill Street Blues
- Trae Waynes, Minnesota Vikings cornerback, #11 pick in 2015 NFL draft
