= Madison Metropolitan School District =

School district in Wisconsin, United States

Location
- 545 West Dayton Street; Madison, Wisconsin United States

District information
- Type: Public
- Grades: Pre-K–12th
- Superintendent: Dr. Joe Gothard
- Schools: 54
- Budget: $530 million (2021-22)
- NCES District ID: 5508520

Students and staff
- Students: 25,247 (2023–24)
- Teachers: 2,046.29 (on an FTE basis)
- Staff: 4,048.38 (on an FTE basis)
- Student–teacher ratio: 12.34:1

Other information
- Website: www.madison.k12.wi.us

The Madison Metropolitan School District (MMSD) is a public school district headquartered in Madison, Wisconsin. It serves the cities of Madison and Fitchburg, the villages of Shorewood Hills and Maple Bluff, and the towns of Blooming Grove and Burke.

The school district includes four comprehensive high schools and two alternative high schools, 12 middle schools and 32 elementary schools, for a total of 52 schools.

== General information ==
As of the 2020-2021 school year, the district serves 26,121 students, making it the second largest in Wisconsin. It has 52 schools, including 32 elementary schools (grades K-5), 12 middle schools (grades 6–8), and 6 high schools. The district also has early childhood programs and alternative programs at the secondary level.

The district covers about 65 square miles (170 km^{2}), including all or part of the cities of Madison and Fitchburg, the villages of Maple Bluff and Shorewood Hills, and the towns of Blooming Grove and Burke.

In an effort to encourage the involvement of students, the Madison Student Senate (MSS) was formed. It allows eight representatives from each high school (including affiliated alternatives) to meet bi-weekly with members of the board to discuss and change district policies for the benefit of Madison students.

== History ==
The first public school in Madison held classes in 1838 in a room of the home of Isaac H. Palmer, with schoolteacher Louisa Brayton. The school district was recognized by the territorial government in December 1841. Following the incorporation of the city of Madison in 1846, a board of education was organized and the first superintendent was chosen: Damon Kilgore, a teacher who had begun teaching in Madison two years earlier.

=== First high school ===
According to the Dane County Historical Society, the county's first public high school (Madison Central High) began in 1853 in the basement of a Methodist Church, with 90 students and just one teacher. In ensuing years, it had several names, starting as Madison High School, with graduates including noted architect Frank Lloyd Wright. Then in 1922 it was renamed as Madison Central High School after a new school -- Madison East High School—became the city's second high school. Noted artist Georgia O'Keeffe attended Central High School. In 1965, the name was changed to Central-University High School until its closure in 1969.

=== Desegregation ===
In December 1983, the Madison School Board adopted a desegregation plan that was implemented on August 28, 1984. The plan aimed to reduce the disproportionate number of minority students at Lincoln and Franklin elementary schools, both on the south side of Madison, to approximately 30%. Franklin Elementary was paired with Randall Elementary and Midvale Elementary with Lincoln Elementary. Since then, Lapham Elementary School and Marquette Elementary School have also joined as sister schools. Franklin, Midvale and Lapham serve grades K-2, and Randall, Lincoln and Marquette serve grades 3–5.

The district allows students to use the pronouns they prefer, something the Wisconsin Supreme Court upheld.

== Schools ==
=== High schools ===
School	Year built	Notes
Vel Phillips Memorial High School	1966	Formerly named James Madison Memorial High School, renamed in 2021.
Madison West High School	1930	A junior high school was built later but closed to accommodate space for the growing senior high school.
Madison East High School	1922	The oldest continuously running public high school in Madison.
LaFollette High School	1963	Named after U.S. Senator and Governor for Wisconsin Robert M. La Follette.
Capital High School	2016	Until 2023, Capital had two campuses.
Shabazz City High School	1971	Alternative high school established in 1971 that merged with City High School in 1979 and changed its name to honor activist Malcolm X.

=== Middle schools ===
School	Year built	Notes
Black Hawk Middle School		Formerly named Gompers Middle School
Cherokee Heights Middle School		
Velma Hamilton Middle School		Formerly named Van Hise Middle School
Ezekiel Gillespie Middle School	1970	Formerly named Thomas Jefferson Middle School, renamed in 2023.
Georgia O'Keeffe Middle School		Formerly named Marquette Middle School
Ray F. Sennett Middle School		
Sherman Middle School		
Spring Harbor Middle School		Environmental magnet middle school
Akira R. Toki Middle School		Formerly named Orchard Ridge Middle School
Annie G. Whitehorse Middle School		Formerly named Schenk Middle School
James C. Wright Middle School	1997	Originally named Middle School 2000. Magnet school with a focus on social justice and activism
Badger Rock Middle School	2011	Agro-urban charter

=== Elementary schools ===
- Milele Chikasa Anana (formerly Philip H. Falk Elementary School)
- César Chávez Elementary School
- Crestwood Elementary School
- Conrad A. Elvehjem Elementary School
- Emerson Elementary School
- Franklin Elementary School
- Samuel Gompers Elementary School
- Hawthorne Elementary School
- Henderson Elementary School (formerly Glendale Elementary School)
- Ray W. Huegel Elementary School
- John F. Kennedy Elementary School
- Lake View Elementary School
- Lapham Elementary School
- Aldo Leopold Elementary School
- Abraham Lincoln Elementary School
- Charles Lindbergh Elementary School
- Lori Mann Carey Elementary School (also known as Southside Elementary School, new building serving former Frank Allis Elementary School students)
- Lowell Elementary School
- Marquette Elementary School
- Mendota Elementary School
- Midvale Elementary School
- John Muir Elementary School
- Nuestro Mundo Community School (Frank Allis)
- Paul J. Olson Elementary School
- Orchard Ridge Elementary School
- Randall Elementary School
- Carl Sandburg Elementary School
- Schenk Elementary School
- Shorewood Hills Elementary School
- Glenn Stephens Elementary School
- Thoreau Elementary School
- Van Hise Elementary School

== Leadership ==
=== Board of education ===
The district is run by a seven-member school board. Members are elected in April for staggered three-year terms. The superintendent of the district is chosen by the Board.

Position	Name	Assumed office	Term ends	Electoral history	Refs
Vice President Seat 1	Maia Pearson	2021	2024	Elected in 2021.	
Member Seat 2	Savion Castro	2019	2024	Appointed to continue Mary Burke's term. Elected to finish Burke's term in 2020. Elected to full term in 2021.	
Member Seat 3	Laura Simkin	2022	2025	Elected in 2022.	
President Seat 4	Ali Janae Muldrow	2019	2025	Elected in 2019. Re-elected in 2022.	
Treasurer Seat 5	Nichelle Nichols	2022	2025	Elected in 2022.	
Member Seat 6	Christina Gomez Schmidt	2020	2023	Elected in 2020.	
Clerk Seat 7	Nicki Vander Meulen	2017	2023	Elected in 2017. Re-elected in 2020.	

== Partnerships ==
The Madison Metropolitan School District has many partnerships in the area. "At Home In Madison" is a partnership of business, community, school and city leaders that provides information to home buyers and relocating families about Madison's schools, neighborhoods and resources for home ownership.

Several before and after school programs are offered by local business and organizations. The local YMCA provides services for several of the local schools, including before and after school programs at Elvehjem, Gompers, Kennedy, Sandburg, and Schenk Elementary schools. Madison School and Community Recreation (MSCR) offers after school programs known as The Safe Haven Community and Learning Center, to which students must apply in order to participate. The Playful Kids Learning Clubhouse offers after school programs at Crestwood and Muir Elementary schools, and the Red Caboose does so at Lapham and Marquette Elementary schools. The Wisconsin Youth Company offers both before and after school at specific locations.

Madison Metropolitan School District also has a partnership with the local universities and colleges. Forward Madison is a partnership between Madison Metropolitan School District and UW-Madison's School of Education. As well, students from the University of Wisconsin–Madison, University of Wisconsin–Whitewater, Edgewood University, and Madison Area Technical College are welcomed into the classrooms of several schools within MMSD as a part of their degree program. Additionally, the schools are a resource for research and information for the universities.

== Controversies ==
In 2019, Madison West High School received international attention after the school fired Marlon Anderson, the school's security assistant, after he asked a student not to call him the N-word, while repeating it himself. Students at the school participated in a walk out, American singer Cher offered to pay Anderson's legal fees if he choose to pursue legal action, and national pushback was received. MMSD rescinded his firing a week later.

In February 2020, the school district was sued by a group of parents, represented by the Wisconsin Institute for Law and Liberty, alleging that new policies regarding gender identity were a violation of federal law. The new policy instructs teachers how to assist children as young as five in social transition to another gender, and prohibits notifying the parents without the child's permission. This assistance could involve using different names and pronouns, or could include allowing access to opposite sex restrooms, changing rooms, and sports. The plaintiff parents allege this is a violation of parental rights and Family Educational Rights and Privacy Act (FERPA), particularly given that the teachers received instructions on how to avoid triggering FERPA requirements. In September 2020, a Dane County judge issued an injunction prohibiting MMSD from implementing the policy in a way that "allows or requires District staff to conceal information or to answer untruthfully in response to any question that parents ask about their child at school."

In 2021, a controversy developed around an East High School teacher's use of hidden surveillance cameras in hotel bathrooms on a field trip.

In early 2022, a controversy happened at La Follette High School when a teen was attacked by a group of kids and the school administration was accused of not acting appropriately.
