= Franklin School (Boise, Idaho) =

Historic building in Boise, Idaho

- U.S. National Register of Historic Places
- School (left, 1905) and High School (right, 1926), from northwest in 1947

- Location within the United States Location within Idaho
- Location: 5007 Franklin Road; Boise, Idaho, U.S.
- Coordinates: 43°36′09″N 116°14′38″W
- Area: 8.3 acres (3.4 ha)
- Built: 1926; 100 years ago
- Architect: Tourtellotte & Co., Tourtellotte & Hummel
- Demolished: 2009; 17 years ago
- MPS: Boise Public Schools TR
- NRHP reference No.: 82000200
- Added to NRHP: November 8, 1982

Franklin School was a two-story brick and stucco building in the western United States, located in Boise, Idaho. Designed by Tourtellotte & Hummel and constructed in 1926, the school featured a flat roof with a decorated concrete parapet. Added to the National Register of Historic Places (NRHP) in 1982, it was demolished in 2009.

== History ==
In 1876, William B. Morris established an irrigation canal from the Boise River to his property, the Morris Ranch, in an area that became Boise's Central Bench. His nephew, William H. Ridenbaugh, completed the project in 1878, and the ditch became known as the Ridenbaugh Canal. Settlers established farms in the area of the Morris Ranch, later named the Ridenbaugh Ranch, after completion of the canal. In the 1880s, Benjamin Scott purchased the Ridenbaugh Ranch, and he donated land for construction of a one-room school at the corner of Franklin and Orchard Roads. Scott School was part of the community of Franklin, about three miles (5 km) west of downtown Boise City, and it was the only school in District #45, the Scott School District. The schoolhouse was enlarged to two rooms in 1901; by 1903, the district had 132 students, and it was ready for a larger school building.

In 1905, a new school was designed for the site by Tourtellotte & Co., a two-story, five-room building with sandstone facade, and it was known as Franklin School by 1906. District #45 was renamed the Franklin School District.

In 1926, Tourtellotte & Hummel designed an eight-room high school at the site, west of Franklin School. The 1926 building, Franklin High School, was constructed by contractor L.S. Mallory, and it was added to the NRHP in 1982.

A gymnasium designed by Wayland & Fennell was added to Franklin High School in 1936, and additional classrooms were added later.

By a vote of 214 to 2, Franklin voters approved annexation of District #45 into the Boise Independent School District in 1947. High school students from Franklin were sent to Boise High School beginning in 1948, and the name of Franklin High School was changed briefly to Fairmont Elementary School. By 1952, the name had changed to Franklin Elementary School. It closed in 2008, and the building was demolished in 2009.

Boise City Parks and Recreation purchased a portion of the property in 2013, and the corner parcel that was the site of Franklin School was purchased by Maverik, a gasoline and convenience market company. Community activists opposed Maverik's plan to build an outlet at the site, and Maverik announced in January 2019 that it would sell the site.
