= Mary D. Bradford =

Mary Davison Bradford
- Born: January 15, 1856; Paris, Wisconsin
- Died: February 3, 1943 (aged 87); Kenosha, Wisconsin
- Occupation: Academic administrator
- Years active: 1876–1921

Mary Davison Bradford (January 15, 1856 – February 3, 1943) became the first woman in Wisconsin to serve as superintendent of a major city school system. She served as Superintendent of Schools of Kenosha, Wisconsin, from 1910 to 1921.

Mrs. Bradford, the former Mary Davison, was born in Kenosha County in 1856 and graduated from Oshkosh Normal School in 1876. She taught at Kenosha High School from 1876 to 1878. She became a member of the Board of Visitors of the Milwaukee State Normal School in 1892, joined the new faculty of Stevens Point Normal in 1894, and joined the faculty of Stout Institute in 1906. She then joined the faculty of Whitewater State Normal in 1909 where she served one year before returning to Kenosha. She started the first kindergarten program in the city before retiring in 1921 after 45 years in education.

Bradford's memoirs were first published serially beginning in September 1930 in the "Wisconsin Magazine of History", and in 1932 they were published in book form. She died in Kenosha on February 3, 1943, at the age of 87. Bradford High School and Bradford Community Church are named after her.
