= Vel Phillips Memorial High School =

Public high school in Madison, Wisconsin

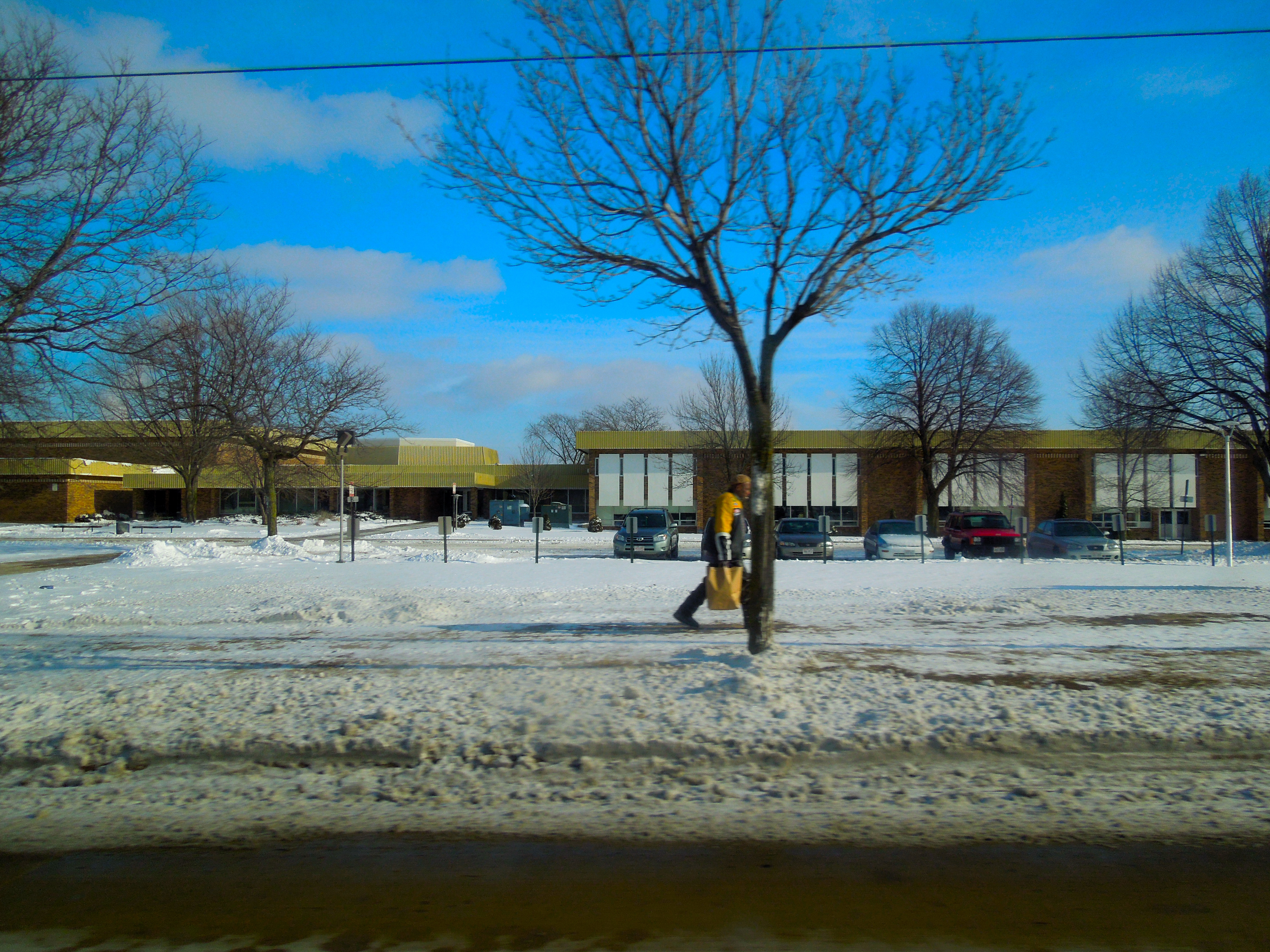

Location
- 201 South Gammon Road; Madison, Wisconsin 53717; United States; 43.06374°N 89.50079°W

Information
- Former name: James Madison Memorial High School (1966-2021)
- Type: Public high school
- Established: 1966
- School district: Madison Metropolitan School District
- NCES School ID: 550852000937
- Principal: Matt Hendrickson
- Teaching staff: 124.50 (on an FTE basis)
- Grades: 9–12
- Enrollment: 2,025 (2023–24)
- Student to teacher ratio: 16.65
- Colors: Green and White
- Athletics conference: Big Eight Conference
- Mascot: Bruce the Spartan
- Newspaper: The Sword and Shield
- Yearbook: The Olympian
- Website: memorial.madison.k12.wi.us

Vel Phillips Memorial High School (VPM, formerly James Madison Memorial High School) is a public high school on the west side of Madison, Wisconsin, United States. It was built in 1966 and is one of six secondary schools in the Madison Metropolitan School District. The school is named after Vel Phillips, an attorney, politician, jurist, and civil rights activist. It is home to the MMSD Planetarium.

== History ==
The school was originally built in 1966, but received a major addition in 1967 because the school's population was higher than expected. It was originally named for James Madison, a U.S. Founding Father, the nation's fourth president, and the city of Madison's namesake. The A-Wing housed the senior high and B-Wing the junior high. It was not until the 1970s that Thomas Jefferson Middle School (now Ezekiel Gillespie) was built. A fieldhouse was added in 1992.

On February 11, 2014, principal Bruce Dahmen unexpectedly died from a heart attack while on a field trip with students. A memorial service was held in the main gym. The welcome center was named after Dahmen.

From May 2022 to August 2024, the school went under an extensive renovation as part of a referendum passed in the fall of 2020.

In 2022, the school was renamed as Vel Phillips Memorial High School by the Madison Metropolitan School District board after concern was raised by the public over James Madison's ownership of enslaved people, following a petition started by a student in 2017. Only one year later, the adjacent Thomas Jefferson Middle School was renamed as Ezekiel Gillespie Middle School.

== Academics ==
Memorial offers classes ranging from Algebra 1 to Photography. Chinese, German, French and Spanish are some of their language classes.

The school also hosts the Madison school district's planetarium and offers an Astronomy class.

== Small Learning Communities grant ==
In 2001, Memorial received a U.S. Department of Education Small Learning Communities federal grant to support a "neighborhood" reorganization. The four neighborhoods are Rock, Wolf, Fox, and Wisconsin . Each of the neighborhoods have a neighborhood center. The Fox Neighborhood Center is known by the students and staff as the "fishbowl".

== School newspapers ==
The official school newspaper is The Sword and Shield and until 2014 kept all issues online. Independent newspapers, The Spartacus and Aficionado existed at one time, but have all ceased distribution. The Independent was created after the 1990–91 school year by The Sword and Shield staff.

== Extracurricular activities ==
Memorial offers interscholastic sports and extramural activities. .

=== Athletics ===
==== Baseball ====
- 1990 State champion; beat Marinette, 8–7 (9)
- 1992 State champion; beat Oconomowoc, 10–8

==== Basketball (boys) ====
- 2005 State champion; beat Milwaukee Vincent, 63–55
- 2009 State champion; beat Racine Horlick, 56–41
- 2011 State champion; beat De Pere, 80–78 (3OT)

==== Cross country (boys) ====
- 1967 State champion; beat Antigo, 80–82
- 1969 State champion; beat Milwaukee Marshall, 52–109
- 1991 State champion; beat Homestead, 65–97

==== Soccer (boys) ====
- 2006 State champion; beat Brookfield East, 2–0

==== Swimming and diving (boys) ====
- 2005 State champion; beat Arrowhead, 269.5–222
- 2006 State champion; beat Arrowhead, 272–245
- 2007 State champion; beat Arrowhead, 257.5–212.5
- 2009 State champion; beat Sauk Prairie/Wisconsin Heights, 200.5–182.5
- 2011 State champion; beat Waukesha South/Catholic Memorial, 234.5–192
- 2012 State champion; beat Arrowhead, 326–234
- 2013 State champion; beat Madison West, 316–206
- 2014 State champion; beat Madison West, 319–216.5
- 2015 State champion; beat Madison West, 350.5–201
- 2016 State champion; beat Madison West, 314–202

==== Swimming and diving (girls) ====
- 1999 State champion; beat Arrowhead, 313–242.5
- 2000 State champion; beat Arrowhead, 320.5–236
- 2001 State champion; beat Madison West, 295–267.5

==== Track and field (girls) ====
- 2003 State champion; beat Waukesha West, Hartford, Cudahy & Waukesha Catholic Memorial, 34–25

=== Conference affiliation history ===
- Big Eight Conference (1967–present)

== Notable alumni ==
- Christina and Michelle Naughton, twin pianists
- Vander Blue, NBA player
- Jake Ferguson, NFL tight end
- Tamara Grigsby, member of the Wisconsin State Assembly (2005–2013)
- Ari Herstand, class of 2003; singer-songwriter, author, actor, and blogger
- Mark Johnson, former NHL player and gold medalist with the US Olympic Men's Hockey team at the 1980 Winter Olympics; UW-Madison women's hockey coach
- Wesley Matthews, class of 2005; NBA guard
- Jeronne Maymon (born 1991), former basketball player for Hapoel Eilat B.C. of the Israeli Basketball Premier League
