= Loomis Union School District =

School district in California, United States

Address
- 3290 Humphrey Road Loomis, California, 95650; United States

District information
- Type: Public
- Grades: K–8
- NCES District ID: 0622560

Students and staff
- Students: 2,847 (2020–2021)
- Teachers: 126.13 (FTE)
- Staff: 93.56 (FTE)
- Student–teacher ratio: 22.57:1

Other information
- Website: www.loomis-usd.k12.ca.us

Loomis Union School District is a public school district based in Placer County, California, United States.

Areas in the district are also assigned to Placer Union High School District
