= La Follette High School =

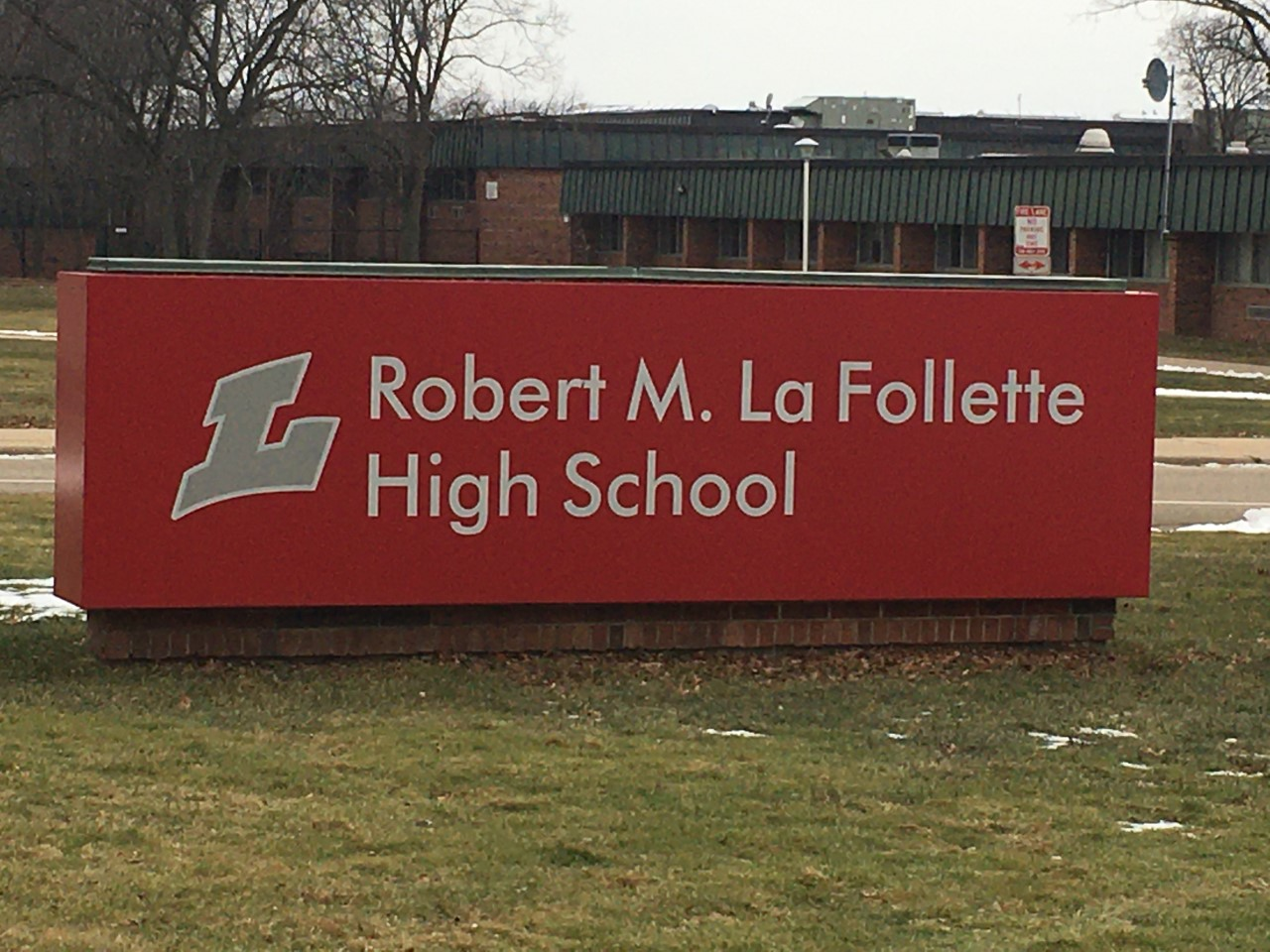

Location
- 702 Pflaum Road; Madison, Wisconsin; United States; 43°03′48.3″N 89°19′10.9″W

Information
- Type: Public secondary
- Established: 1963
- Oversight: Madison Metropolitan School District (MMSD)
- Principal: Mathew Thompson
- Teaching staff: 99.53 (FTE)
- Grades: 9-12
- Enrollment: 1,527 (2023–2024)
- Student to teacher ratio: 15.34
- Colors: Maroon and Gray
- Mascot: Larry the Lancer
- Accreditation: AdvancED
- Newspaper: The Lance
- Yearbook: The Statesman
- Website: https://lafollette.madison.k12.wi.us/

Robert M. La Follette High School is a public high school in Madison, Wisconsin, United States. It was established in 1963 and is one of six secondary schools in the Madison Metropolitan School District. It serves the city's far east side with its attendance boundaries, including parts of Fitchburg, Blooming Grove, and Burke, teaching students in grades 9-12. The school is named after lawyer and politician Robert M. La Follette.

== History ==
In 2020, a referendum approved extensive renovations to the school. Renovation planning occurred in 2021, with construction scheduled to last from May 2022 to August 2024.

The renovations to the athletic spaces include a new gym and weight room and renovated locker rooms that can each be separated into two smaller rooms. The existing spectator gym, separated from the rest of the athletic facilities, is being turned into classroom space. The stadium was remodeled.

== Academics ==
La Follette has 14 academic departments with more than 150 faculty teaching 250 courses. Courses are taught in a variety of academic settings, from traditional classrooms to community-based service experiences. Additional opportunities for growth and leadership are offered through involvement in numerous student organizations. The school began offering American sign language as a foreign language in 1998, and other schools have modeled their programs after La Follette's.

Honors and advanced classes are part of the curriculum. Advanced Placement (AP) courses include Calculus AB, Calculus BC, Environmental Science, Statistics, French Language and Culture, Spanish Language and Culture, Music Theory, Psychology, Macroeconomics, Microeconomics, Modern European History, Computer Science Principles, and Computer Science A. Courses are available in advanced physics, advanced chemistry, anatomy, literature, composition, creative writing, and computer programming.

== Extra-curricular activities ==
=== Athletics ===
La Follette is part of WIAA Big 8 Conference. La Follette athletics include girls' volleyball, boys' volleyball, girls' soccer, boys' soccer, boys' basketball, girls' basketball, wrestling, boys' track & field, girls' track & field, football, girls' swim, boys' swim, boys' cross country, girls' cross country, dance, cheer, hockey, girls' golf, boys' golf, baseball, softball, girls' tennis, boys' tennis.

WIAA State Championships
Sport	Year(s)
Basketball (boys)	1977, 1982, 2002
Cross country (boys)	2006, 2007, 2011(individual), 2015(individual), 2016(individual)
Dance (jazz) Wisconsin Association of Cheer/Pom Coaches (non-WIAA)	1992, 1994
Golf (boys)	2003
Track and field (boys)	1969, 2002, 2008(individual), 2016(individual)
Track and field (girls	2006(individual)
Track and field (girls wheelchair)	2017, 2018

=== Conference affiliation history ===
- Big Eight Conference (1964–present)

== Other activities and events ==
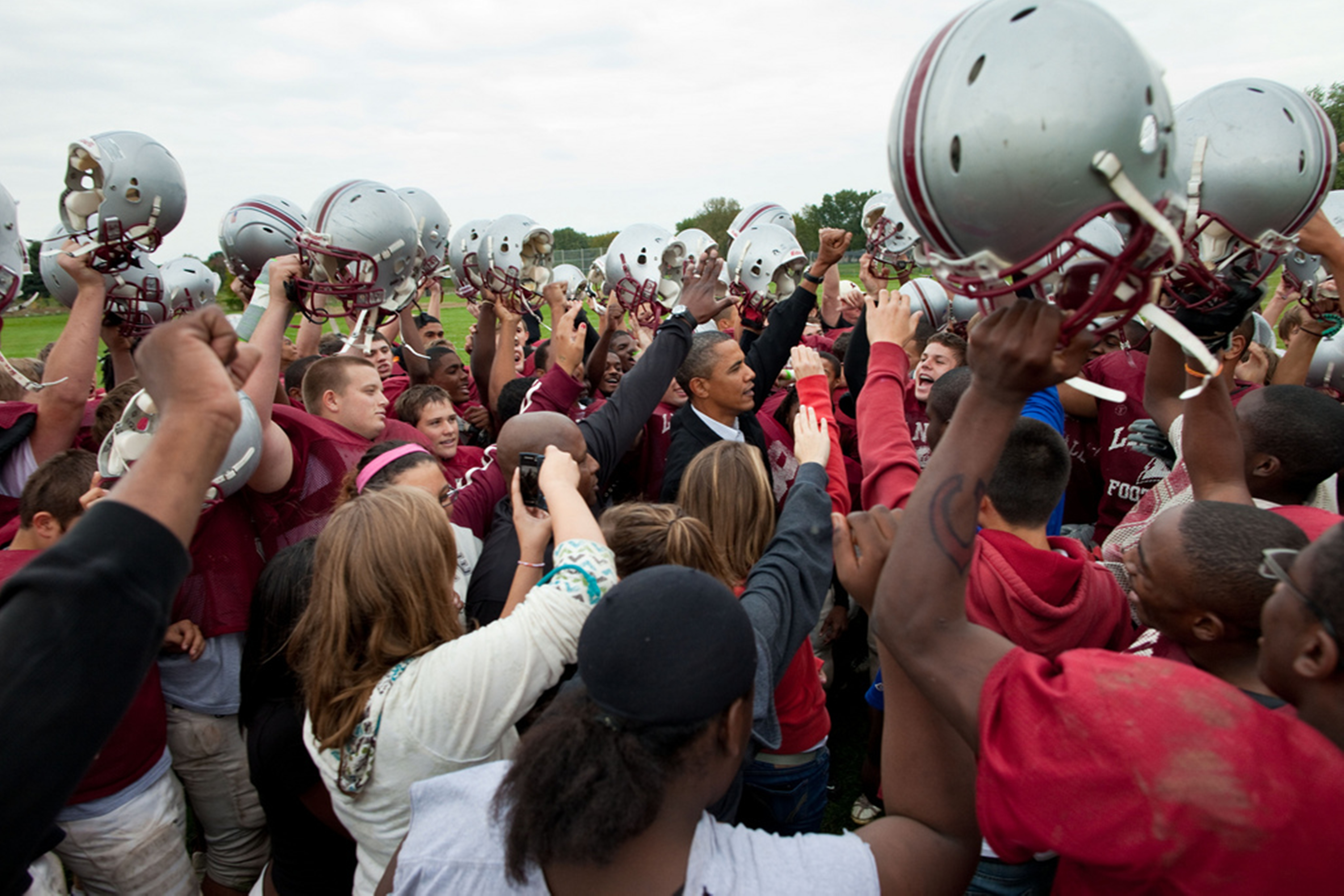
President Obama visits La Follette in 2010

=== Arboretum ===
La Follette has one of the few on-ground arboretums in the state. It was designed to have three ecosystems, including prairie, woodland and pond.

=== Board of visitors ===
La Follette's board of visitors serves as an advocate for the school and is the only school in the Madison area, and possibly the state, which has such a board. The board assists in fundraising, business, community outreach, public affairs, student support and teacher support.

=== Business ===
In 2011, Summit Credit Union began operations at La Follette High School. In the ensuing years, branches were opened at other Madison-area high schools. The branch is staffed by interns from the La Follette career internship class and is open during the lunch hour.

=== Presidential visit ===
On September 28, 2010, the school was visited by President Barack Obama, who made an unannounced stop ahead of a late-afternoon rally on the UW-Madison campus.

=== NPHC visit ===
On November 9, 2022, the National Pan-Hellenic Council (NPHC) of UW Madison performed for the student body alongside The Badgerettes and NLE Choppa at the school's HBCU fair.

=== Publications ===
The Lance is the student newspaper for La Follette; its yearbook is known as The Statesman; The Lancer Legend is the parent newsletter.

== Notable alumni ==
- Marc Behrend, 1979; former professional hockey player
- Craig Brown, 1994; curler
- Erika Brown, 1992; curler
- Chuck Chvala, 1973; former State Senate Majority Leader
- Brian Detter, 1977; business executive and former defense official
- Jonte Flowers, 2003; Professional Basketball Player
- Dianne Hesselbein, 1989; member of Wisconsin State Assembly
- Tim Jordan, 1982; former professional football player
- Ron Kanter, 1965; EMMY for Cinematography, 1987
- Peter Mueller, 1972; speed skater
- Nicole Newman, 2014; softball player
- Jeff Nygaard, 1990; Olympic beach volleyball player, 2004; U.S. Men's Olympic National Indoor team, 1996, 2000
- Craig Smith, 2008; current NHL player for the Washington Capitals and former University of Wisconsin hockey player
