= Madison Central High School (Wisconsin) =

High school in Madison, Wisconsin, United States

Central High School was a public high school in Madison, Wisconsin. It was open from 1854 until 1969. The student newspaper was The Madison Mirror and the yearbook was Tychoberahn. The school nickname was the Tigers, the colors black and orange and moved in 1908 to the site where it would stay until it closed.

== History ==
Madison Central High School was Dane County's oldest school, having begun in 1853 in the basement of a Methodist church with one teacher and 90 students. The school was first known as Madison High School but over the years became Madison Central High School (1922) and in 1965, Central-University High School when intern teachers from the University of Wisconsin became part of the teaching staff.

The school was designed by Cass Gilbert and torn down in 1986 to make room for an MATC parking lot.

== Notable alumni ==
- Georgia O'Keeffe (attended 1902–1903) – Artist
- Herman W. Sachtjen (1905) – 49th speaker of the Wisconsin State Assembly and a Wisconsin circuit judge
- Margaret H'Doubler (1906) – Credited with establishing, in 1926, the first dance education program at a U.S. university (at the University of Wisconsin)
- Timothy Brown (1907) – Wisconsin Supreme Court Justice from 1949 to 1964 (Chief Justice 1962–1964)
- Alfred Buser (1907) – Captain of the undefeated 1912 University of Wisconsin football team
- John Hasbrouk van Vleck (1913) – Nobel Prize-winner in Physics
- Wayne Lyman Morse (1919) – U.S. Senator from Oregon 1944-1969
- Walter Frautschi (1920) – Madison businessman and philanthropist; father of John J. and W. Jerome “Jerry” Frautschi
- Byron C. Nelson (1912) – apologist for creationism.
- John Bardeen (Class of 1923) – Only person to win the Nobel Prize for Physics twice
- Edward Withers (1947) – All American defensive football player at the University of Wisconsin
- Tracy Nelson (1963) – Blues and country singer
- Frank Lloyd Wright – architect
- Delaphine Grace Wyckoff (1906–2001) – microbiologist and educator
