= List of high schools in Wisconsin =

== Adams County ==
=== Public high schools ===
==== Current public schools ====
- Adams-Friendship High School, Adams

==== Former public schools ====
- Friendship High School, Friendship (closed 1929, merged into Adams-Friendship)

== Ashland County ==
=== Public high schools ===
==== Current public schools ====
- Ashland High School, Ashland
- Butternut High School, Butternut
- Chequamegon North Campus, Glidden
- Mellen High School, Mellen

==== Former public schools ====
- Glidden High School, Glidden (closed 2009, merged into Chequamegon)

=== Private high schools ===
==== Former private schools ====
- De Padua High School, Ashland (closed 1967)

== Barron County ==
=== Public high schools ===
==== Current public schools ====
- Barron High School, Barron
- Cameron High School, Cameron
- Chetek-Weyerhaeuser High School, Chetek
- Cumberland High School, Cumberland
- New Auburn High School, New Auburn
- Prairie Farm High School, Prairie Farm
- Rice Lake High School, Rice Lake
- Turtle Lake High School, Turtle Lake

==== Former public schools ====
- Chetek High School, Chetek (closed 2010, merged into Chetek-Weyerhaeuser)

== Bayfield County ==
=== Public high schools ===
==== Current public schools ====
- Bayfield High School, Bayfield
- Drummond High School, Drummond
- South Shore High School, Port Wing
- Washburn High School, Washburn

==== Former public schools ====
- Cable High School, Cable (closed 1969, folded into Drummond)
- Herbster High School, Herbster (closed 1942, merged into South Shore)
- Iron River High School, Iron River (closed 1967, folded into Northwestern)
- Ondossagon High School, Ashland (closed 1990, folded into Ashland, Drummond and Washburn)
- Port Wing High School, Port Wing (closed 1942, merged into South Shore)

== Brown County ==
=== Public high schools ===
==== Green Bay Area School District ====
- Green Bay East High School
- Green Bay Southwest High School
- Green Bay West High School
- Preble High School

==== Other current public schools ====
- Ashwaubenon High School, Ashwaubenon
- Bay Port High School, Suamico
- De Pere High School, De Pere
- Denmark High School, Denmark
- Pulaski High School, Pulaski
- West De Pere High School, De Pere
- Wrightstown High School, Wrightstown

=== Private high schools ===
==== Current private schools ====
- Bay City Baptist School, Green Bay
- Chesterton Academy of St. John Paul II Classical School, Green Bay
- Northeastern Wisconsin Lutheran High School, Green Bay
- Notre Dame De La Baie Academy, Green Bay
- Providence Academy, Green Bay

==== Former private schools ====
- Abbot Pennings High School, De Pere (closed 1990, merged into Notre Dame de la Baie Academy)
- Cathedral High School, Green Bay (closed 1941, succeeded by Green Bay Central Catholic)
- Green Bay Central Catholic High School, Green Bay (closed 1955, succeeded by Our Lady of Premontre)
- Green Bay Christian School, Green Bay (closed 2003)
- Our Lady of Premontre High School, Green Bay (closed 1990, merged into Notre Dame de la Baie Academy)
- St. Joseph Academy, Green Bay (closed 1990, merged into Notre Dame de la Baie Academy)

== Buffalo County ==
=== Public high schools ===
==== Current public schools ====
- Alma High School, Alma
- Cochrane-Fountain City School, Fountain City
- Gilmanton High School, Gilmanton
- Mondovi High School, Mondovi

==== Former public schools ====
- Cochrane High School, Cochrane (closed 1958, merged into Cochrane-Fountain City)
- Fountain City High School, Fountain City (closed 1958, merged into Cochrane-Fountain City)
- Nelson High School, Nelson (closed 1955, folded into Durand)

== Burnett County ==
=== Public high schools ===
==== Current public schools ====
- Grantsburg High School, Grantsburg
- Siren High School, Siren
- Webster High School, Webster

== Calumet County ==
=== Public high schools ===
==== Current public schools ====
- Brillion High School, Brillion
- Chilton High School, Chilton
- Hilbert High School, Hilbert
- New Holstein High School, New Holstein
- Stockbridge High School, Stockbridge

== Chippewa County ==
=== Public high schools ===
==== Current public schools ====
- Bloomer High School, Bloomer
- Cadott High School, Cadott
- Chippewa Falls High School, Chippewa Falls
- Cornell High School, Cornell
- Lake Holcombe School, Holcombe
- Stanley-Boyd High School, Stanley

==== Former public schools ====
- Boyd High School, Boyd (closed 1948, merged into Stanley-Boyd)

=== Private high schools ===
==== Current private schools ====
- McDonell Central Catholic High School, Chippewa Falls

== Clark County ==
=== Public high schools ===
==== Current public schools ====
- Abbotsford High School, Abbotsford
- Colby High School, Colby
- Granton High School, Granton
- Greenwood High School, Greenwood
- Loyal High School, Loyal
- Neillsville High School, Neillsville
- Owen-Withee High School, Owen
- Thorp High School, Thorp

==== Former public schools ====
- Abbotsford High School (original), Abbotsford (closed 1961, merged into Dor-Abby)
- Dor-Abby High School, Abbotsford (Dorchester detached and folded into Colby, 1964)
- Dorchester High School, Dorchester (closed 1961, merged into Dor-Abby)
- Humbird High School, Humbird (closed 1949, merged into Alma Center Lincoln)
- Owen High School, Owen (closed 1955, merged into Owen-Withee)
- Unity High School, Unity (closed 1954, folded into Colby)
- Withee High School, Withee (closed 1955, merged into Owen-Withee)

== Columbia County ==
=== Public high schools ===
==== Current public schools ====
- Cambria-Friesland High School, Cambria
- Columbus Senior High School, Columbus
- Fall River High School, Fall River
- Lodi High School, Lodi
- Pardeeville High School, Pardeeville
- Portage High School, Portage
- Poynette High School, Poynette
- Rio High School, Rio

=== Private high schools ===
==== Current private schools ====
- Wisconsin Academy, Columbus

== Crawford County ==
=== Public high schools ===
==== Current public schools ====
- North Crawford High School, Soldiers Grove
- Prairie du Chien High School, Prairie du Chien
- Seneca High School, Seneca
- Wauzeka-Steuben High School, Wauzeka

==== Former public schools ====
- Gays Mills High School, Gays Mills (closed 1965, merged into North Crawford)
- Soldiers Grove High School, Soldiers Grove (closed 1965, merged into North Crawford)

=== Private high schools ===
==== Former private schools ====
- Campion High School, Prairie du Chien (closed 1975)
- Martin Luther Preparatory School, Prairie du Chien (closed 1995, merged into Luther Prep)

== Dane County ==
=== Public high schools ===
==== Madison Metropolitan School District ====
- Capital High School
- La Follette High School
- Madison East High School
- Madison West High School
- Malcolm Shabazz City High School
- Vel Phillips Memorial High School

==== Other current public schools ====
- Belleville High School, Belleville
- DeForest High School, DeForest
- Deerfield High School, Deerfield
- Marshall High School, Marshall
- McFarland High School, McFarland
- Middleton High School, Middleton
- Monona Grove High School, Monona
- Mount Horeb High School, Mount Horeb
- Oregon High School, Oregon
- Stoughton High School, Stoughton
- Sun Prairie East High School, Sun Prairie
- Sun Prairie West High School, Sun Prairie
- Verona Area High School, Verona
- Waunakee High School, Waunakee
- Wisconsin Heights High School, Mazomanie

==== Former public schools ====
- Black Earth High School, Black Earth (closed 1963, merged into Wisconsin Heights)
- Madison Central High School, Madison (closed 1969)
- Mazomanie High School, Mazomanie (closed 1963, merged into Wisconsin Heights)
- University of Wisconsin High School, Madison (closed 1964, folded into Madison Central)

=== Private high schools ===
==== Current private schools ====
- Abundant Life Christian School, Madison
- Edgewood High School of the Sacred Heart, Madison
- Madison Country Day School, Waunakee
- Impact Christian Academy, Verona
- St. Ambrose Academy, Madison

==== Former private schools ====
- Calvary Baptist Christian School, Sun Prairie (closed 2008)
- Holy Name Seminary High School, Madison (closed 1995)
- Queen of Apostles High School, Madison (closed 1979)
- Queen of Apostles Seminary High School, Madison (closed 1965, succeeded by Queen of Apostles High School)

== Dodge County ==
=== Public high schools ===
==== Current public schools ====
- Beaver Dam High School, Beaver Dam
- Dodgeland High School, Juneau
- Horicon High School, Horicon
- Hustisford High School, Hustisford (closing 2027)
- Lomira High School, Lomira
- Mayville High School, Mayville
- Randolph High School, Randolph
- Watertown High School, Watertown
- Waupun High School, Waupun

==== Former public schools ====
- Fox Lake High School, Fox Lake (closed 1962, folded into Beaver Dam)
- Juneau High School, Juneau (closed 1969, merged into Dodgeland)
- Lowell-Reeseville High School, Reeseville (closed 1969, merged into Dodgeland)
- Reeseville High School, Reeseville (closed 1949, folded into Juneau)

=== Private high schools ===
==== Current private schools ====
- Central Wisconsin Christian High School, Waupun
- Mountain Top Christian School, Horicon
- Wayland Academy, Beaver Dam

==== Former private schools ====
- Victory Christian School, Neosho (closed 2009)

== Door County ==
=== Public high schools ===
==== Current public schools ====
- Gibraltar High School, Fish Creek
- Sevastopol High School, Sturgeon Bay
- Southern Door High School, Brussels
- Sturgeon Bay High School, Sturgeon Bay
- Washington Island High School, Washington Island

==== Former public schools ====
- Brussels High School, Brussels (closed 1962, succeeded by Southern Door)

== Douglas County ==
=== Public high schools ===
==== Current public schools ====
- Northwestern High School, Maple
- Solon Springs High School, Solon Springs
- Superior High School, Superior

==== Former public schools ====
- Gordon High School, Gordon (closed 1951, folded into Northwood)
- Poplar High School, Poplar (closed 1949, merged into Northwestern)
- Superior Central High School, Superior (closed 1965, merged into Superior)
- Superior East High School, Superior (closed 1965, merged into Superior)

=== Private high schools ===
==== Current private schools ====
- Maranatha Academy, Superior

==== Former private schools ====
- Cathedral High School, Superior (closed 1969)

== Dunn County ==
=== Public and charter high schools ===
==== Current public schools ====
- Boyceville High School, Boyceville
- Colfax High School, Colfax
- Elk Mound High School, Elk Mound
- Menomonie High School, Menomonie

==== Current charter schools ====
- Lucas Charter School, Menomonie

==== Former public and charter schools ====
- Downing High School, Downing (closed 1944, folded into Glenwood City)
- Dunn County School of Agriculture and Domestic Science, Menomonie (closed 1957)

== Eau Claire County ==
=== Public and charter high schools ===
==== Current public schools ====
- Altoona High School, Altoona
- Augusta High School, Augusta
- Fall Creek High School, Fall Creek
- Memorial High School, Eau Claire
- North High School, Eau Claire

==== Current charter schools ====
- Eau Claire Technology Charter School, Eau Claire
- McKinley Charter School, Eau Claire

==== Former public and charter schools ====
- Fairchild High School, Fairchild (closed 1968, merged into Osseo-Fairchild)

=== Private high schools ===
==== Current private schools ====
- Eau Claire Christian High School, Eau Claire
- Immanuel Lutheran High School, Eau Claire
- Regis High School, Eau Claire

==== Former private schools ====
- St. Patrick's High School, Eau Claire (closed 1951, succeeded by Regis)
- St. Mary's High School, Altoona (closed 1938)

== Florence County ==
=== Public high schools ===
==== Current public schools ====
- Florence High School, Florence

== Fond du Lac County ==
=== Public high schools ===
==== Current public schools ====
- Campbellsport High School, Campbellsport
- Fond du Lac High School, Fond du Lac
- Horace Mann High School, North Fond du Lac
- Laconia High School, Rosendale
- Oakfield High School, Oakfield
- Ripon High School, Ripon

==== Former public schools ====
- Brandon High School, Brandon (closed 1969, merged into Laconia)
- Rosendale High School, Rosendale (closed 1969, merged into Laconia)

=== Private high schools ===
==== Current private schools ====
- St. Lawrence Seminary High School, Mount Calvary
- St. Mary Springs High School, Fond du Lac
- Winnebago Lutheran Academy, Fond du Lac

== Forest County ==
=== Public high schools ===
==== Current public schools ====
- Crandon High School, Crandon
- Laona High School, Laona
- Wabeno High School, Wabeno

==== Former public schools ====
- Argonne High School, Argonne (closed 1942, folded into Crandon)
- Elvoy School, Nelma (closed 1943, folded into Crandon)
- Hiles High School, Hiles (closed 1943, folded into Crandon)

== Grant County ==
=== Public high schools ===
==== Current public schools ====
- Boscobel High School, Boscobel
- Cassville High School, Cassville
- Cuba City High School, Cuba City
- Fennimore High School, Fennimore
- Lancaster High School, Lancaster
- Platteville High School, Platteville
- Potosi High School, Potosi
- River Ridge High School, Patch Grove
- Riverdale High School, Muscoda
- Southwestern Wisconsin High School, Hazel Green

==== Former public schools ====
- Bagley High School, Bagley (closed 1960, merged into West Grant)
- Bloomington High School, Bloomington (closed 1995, merged into River Ridge)
- Livingston High School, Livingston (closed 1960, merged into Iowa-Grant)
- Montfort High School, Montfort (closed 1960, merged into Iowa-Grant)
- Mount Hope High School, Mount Hope (closed 1960, merged into West Grant)
- Muscoda High School, Muscoda (closed 1967, merged into Riverdale)
- Patch Grove High School, Patch Grove (closed 1960, merged into West Grant)
- West Grant High School, Patch Grove (closed 1995, merged into River Ridge)

== Green County ==
=== Public high schools ===
==== Current public schools ====
- Albany High School, Albany
- Brodhead High School, Brodhead
- Juda High School, Juda
- Monroe High School, Monroe
- Monticello High School, Monticello
- New Glarus High School, New Glarus

==== Former public schools ====
- Brooklyn High School, Brooklyn (closed 1962, folded into Oregon)

== Green Lake County ==
=== Public high schools ===
==== Current public schools ====
- Berlin High School, Berlin
- Green Lake High School, Green Lake
- Markesan High School, Markesan
- Princeton High School, Princeton

== Iowa County ==
=== Public high schools ===
==== Current public schools ====
- Barneveld High School, Barneveld
- Dodgeville High School, Dodgeville
- Highland High School, Highland
- Iowa-Grant High School, Livingston
- Mineral Point High School, Mineral Point

==== Former public schools ====
- Arena High School, Arena (closed 1962, merged into River Valley)
- Avoca High School, Avoca (closed 1960, folded into Muscoda)
- Cobb High School, Cobb (closed 1960, merged into Iowa-Grant)
- Hollandale High School, Hollandale (closed 1971, merged into Pecatonica)
- Linden High School, Linden (closed 1959, folded into Cobb)
- Rewey High School, Rewey (closed 1951, folded into Livingston)
- Ridgeway High School, Ridgeway (closed 1962, folded into Dodgeville)

== Iron County ==
=== Public high schools ===
==== Current public schools ====
- Hurley High School, Hurley
- Mercer Public School, Mercer

==== Former public schools ====
- Iron Belt High School, Iron Belt (closed 1957, folded into Hurley)
- Saxon High School, Saxon (closed 1964, folded into Hurley)

== Jackson County ==
=== Public high schools ===
==== Current public schools ====
- Black River Falls High School, Black River Falls
- Lincoln High School, Alma Center
- Melrose-Mindoro High School, Melrose

==== Former public schools ====
- Alma Center High School, Alma Center (closed 1949, merged into Alma Center Lincoln)
- Hixton High School, Hixton (closed 1961, folded into Black River Falls)
- Melrose High School, Melrose (closed 1965, merged into Melrose-Mindoro)
- Merrillan High School, Merrillan (closed 1949, merged into Alma Center Lincoln)
- Taylor High School, Taylor (closed 1989, merged into Blair-Taylor)

== Jefferson County ==
=== Public high schools ===
==== Current public schools ====
- Cambridge High School, Cambridge
- Fort Atkinson High School, Fort Atkinson
- Jefferson High School, Jefferson
- Johnson Creek High School, Johnson Creek
- Lake Mills High School, Lake Mills
- Palmyra-Eagle High School, Palmyra
- Waterloo High School, Waterloo

=== Private high schools ===
==== Current private schools ====
- Lakeside Lutheran High School, Lake Mills
- Luther Preparatory School, Watertown
- Maranatha Baptist Academy, Watertown

==== Former private schools ====
- Northwestern Preparatory Academy, Watertown (closed 1995, merged into Luther Prep)

== Juneau County ==
=== Public high schools ===
==== Current public schools ====
- Mauston High School, Mauston
- Necedah High School, Necedah
- New Lisbon High School, New Lisbon
- Royall High School, Elroy
- Wonewoc-Center High School, Wonewoc

==== Former public schools ====
- Camp Douglas High School, Camp Douglas (closed 1955, folded into Tomah)
- Elroy High School, Elroy (closed 1959, merged into Royall)

=== Private high schools ===
==== Former private schools ====
- Madonna High School, Mauston (closed 1966)

== Kenosha County ==
=== Public high schools ===
==== Kenosha Unified School District ====
- George Nelson Tremper High School
- Harborside Academy
- Hillcrest School
- Indian Trail High School and Academy
- LakeView Technology Academy, Pleasant Prairie
- Mary D. Bradford High School
- Walter Reuther Central High School

==== Other current public schools ====
- Westosha Central High School, Salem
- Wilmot Union High School, Wilmot

=== Private high schools ===
==== Current private schools ====
- Christian Life High School, Kenosha
- St. Joseph High School, Kenosha
- Shoreland Lutheran High School, Somers

==== Former private schools ====
- St. Mary High School, Kenosha (closed 1958, succeeded by St. Joseph)

== Kewaunee County ==
=== Public high schools ===
==== Current public schools ====
- Algoma High School, Algoma
- Kewaunee High School, Kewaunee
- Luxemburg-Casco High School, Luxemburg

==== Former public schools ====
- Casco High School, Casco (closed 1967, merged into Luxemburg-Casco)
- Luxemburg High School, Luxemburg (closed 1967, merged into Luxemburg-Casco)

== La Crosse County ==
=== Public and charter high schools ===
==== Current public schools ====
- Bangor High School, Bangor
- Holmen High School, Holmen
- La Crosse Central High School, La Crosse
- Logan High School, La Crosse
- Onalaska High School, Onalaska
- West Salem High School, West Salem

==== Current charter schools ====
- LaCrossroads Charter School, La Crosse

==== Former public and charter schools ====
- La Crosse County School of Agriculture and Domestic Science, Onalaska (closed 1925)
- Mindoro High School, Mindoro (closed 1965, merged into Melrose-Mindoro)

=== Private high schools ===
==== Current private schools ====
- Aquinas High School, La Crosse
- Coulee Region Christian School, West Salem
- Luther High School, Onalaska
- Providence Academy, La Crosse

==== Former private schools ====
- Holy Cross Seminary High School, La Crosse (closed 1971)

== Lafayette County ==
=== Public high schools ===
==== Current public schools ====
- Argyle High School, Argyle
- Belmont High School, Belmont
- Benton High School, Benton
- Black Hawk High School, South Wayne
- Darlington High School, Darlington
- Pecatonica High School, Blanchardville
- Shullsburg High School, Shullsburg

==== Former public schools ====
- Blanchardville High School, Blanchardville (closed 1971, merged into Pecatonica)
- Gratiot High School, Gratiot (closed 1967, merged into Black Hawk)
- New Diggings High School, New Diggings (closed 1953, folded into current Southwestern)
- South Wayne High School, South Wayne (closed 1967, merged into Black Hawk)

== Langlade County ==
=== Public high schools ===
==== Current public schools ====
- Antigo High School, Antigo
- Elcho High School, Elcho
- White Lake High School, White Lake

== Lincoln County ==
=== Public high schools ===
==== Current public schools ====
- Lincoln Hills School, Irma
- Merrill High School, Merrill
- Tomahawk High School, Tomahawk

==== Former public schools ====
- Tri-County High School, Tripoli (closed 1969, folded into Prentice)

=== Private high schools ===
==== Current private schools ====
- New Testament Church Christian Academy, Merrill

== Manitowoc County ==
=== Public high schools ===
==== Current public schools ====
- Kiel High School, Kiel
- Lincoln High School, Manitowoc
- Mishicot High School, Mishicot
- Reedsville High School, Reedsville
- Two Rivers High School, Two Rivers
- Valders High School, Valders

==== Former public schools ====
- Manitowoc North High School, Manitowoc (closed 1903, merged into Manitowoc Lincoln)
- Manitowoc South High School, Manitowoc (closed 1903, merged into Manitowoc Lincoln)

=== Private high schools ===
==== Current private schools ====
- Manitowoc Lutheran High School, Manitowoc
- Roncalli High School, Manitowoc

==== Former private schools ====
- John F. Kennedy Preparatory High School, St. Nazianz (closed 1982)
- Salvatorian Seminary High School, St. Nazianz (closed 1968, succeeded by John F. Kennedy Prep)
- St. Gregory High School, St. Nazianz (closed 1969)

== Marathon County ==
=== Public high schools ===
==== Current public schools ====
- Athens High School, Athens
- D.C. Everest Senior High School, Weston
- Edgar High School, Edgar
- Marathon High School, Marathon
- Mosinee High School, Mosinee
- Spencer High School, Spencer
- Stratford High School, Stratford
- Wausau East High School, Wausau
- Wausau Engineering and Global Leadership (EGL) Academy, Wausau
- Wausau West High School, Wausau

=== Private high schools ===
==== Current private schools ====
- Faith Christian Academy, Wausau
- Newman Catholic High School, Wausau
- Northland Lutheran High School, Kronenwetter

==== Former private schools ====
- Wisconsin Valley Lutheran High School, Mosinee (closed 2023)

== Marinette County ==
=== Public high schools ===
==== Current public schools ====
- Coleman High School, Coleman
- Crivitz High School, Crivitz
- Goodman High School, Goodman
- Marinette High School, Marinette
- Niagara High School, Niagara
- Pembine High School, Pembine
- Peshtigo High School, Peshtigo
- Wausaukee High School, Wausaukee

==== Former public schools ====
- Amberg High School, Amberg (closed 1960, folded into Wausaukee)

=== Private high schools ===
==== Current private schools ====
- Faith Christian School, Coleman
- St. Thomas Aquinas Academy, Marinette

==== Former private schools ====
- Pioneer Christian School, Beecher (closed 2012)
- St. Joseph High School, Marinette (closed 1934)

== Marquette County ==
=== Public high schools ===
==== Current public schools ====
- Montello High School, Montello
- Westfield Area High School, Westfield

==== Former public schools ====
- Endeavor High School, Endeavor (closed 1951, merged into Endeavor-Oxford)
- Endeavor-Oxford High School, Endeavor and Oxford (Endeavor detached and folded into Portage, 1954)
- Neshkoro High School, Neshkoro (closed 1948, folded into Westfield)
- Oxford High School (original), Oxford (closed 1951, merged into Endeavor-Oxford)
- Oxford High School, Oxford (closed 1963, folded into Westfield)

== Menominee County ==
=== Public high schools ===
==== Current public schools ====
- Menominee Indian High School, Keshena

=== Private high schools ===
==== Former private schools ====
- St. Joseph Indian School, Keshena (closed 1952)

== Milwaukee County ==
=== Public and charter high schools ===
==== Milwaukee Public Schools ====
- Alexander Hamilton High School
- Assata School
- Audubon Technology and Communication Center High School
- Barack Obama School of Career and Technical Education
- Bay View High School
- Casimir Pulaski High School
- Golda Meir School
- Harold S. Vincent High School
- James Madison Academic Campus
- John Marshall High School
- Lynde & Harry Bradley Technology & Trade High School
- MacDowell Montessori School
- Milwaukee High School of the Arts
- Milwaukee School of Languages
- North Division High School
- Ronald Wilson Reagan College Preparatory High School
- Riverside University High School
- Rufus King International High School
- South Division High School
- Washington High School of Information Technology
- Wisconsin Conservatory of Lifelong Learning

==== Other current public schools ====
- Brown Deer High School, Brown Deer
- Cudahy High School, Cudahy
- Franklin High School, Franklin
- Greendale High School, Greendale
- Greenfield High School, Greenfield
- Nathan Hale High School, West Allis
- Nicolet High School, Glendale
- Oak Creek High School, Oak Creek
- Saint Francis High School, Saint Francis
- Shorewood High School, Shorewood
- South Milwaukee High School, South Milwaukee
- Wauwatosa East High School, Wauwatosa
- Wauwatosa West High School, Wauwatosa
- West Allis Central High School, West Allis
- Whitefish Bay High School, Whitefish Bay
- Whitnall High School, Greenfield

==== Current charter schools ====
- Alliance High School, Milwaukee
- Carmen Schools of Science and Technology, Milwaukee
  - Northwest campus
  - Southgate campus
- Dr. Howard Fuller Collegiate Academy, Milwaukee
- Hmong American Peace Academy, Milwaukee
- Loyola Academy, Milwaukee
- Milwaukee Academy of Science, Milwaukee
- Nova School, Milwaukee
- Tenor High School, Milwaukee
- Veritas High School, Milwaukee

==== Former public and charter schools ====
- Aurora Weier Educational Center, Milwaukee (closed 2008)
- CEO Leadership Academy, Milwaukee (closed 2014)
- Cornerstone Achievement Academy, Milwaukee (closed 2012)
- Custer High School, Milwaukee (closed 2011)
- Grand Avenue Charter School, Milwaukee (closed 2007)
- Learning Enterprise of Wisconsin, Milwaukee (closed 2006)
- Lincoln High School, Milwaukee (closed 1979)
- Maasai Institute High School, Milwaukee (closed 2008)
- Malcolm X Academy, Milwaukee (closed 2008)
- Metropolitan High School, Milwaukee (closed 2010)
- Milwaukee County School of Agriculture and Domestic Science, Wauwatosa (closed 1928)
- Milwaukee Excel High School, Milwaukee (closed 2013)
- Milwaukee Excellence Charter School, Milwaukee (closed 2024)
- Milwaukee School of Entrepreneurship, Milwaukee (closed 2014)
- New School for Community Service, Milwaukee (closed 2018)
- Northwest High School, Milwaukee (closed 2014)
- Phoenix High School, Milwaukee
- Solomon Juneau High School, Milwaukee (closed 2006)
- Spotted Eagle High School, Milwaukee (closed 2012)
- West Milwaukee High School, West Milwaukee (closed 1992)
- Wisconsin Career Academy, Milwaukee (closed 2012)

=== Private high schools ===
==== Current private schools ====
- Academy of Excellence, Milwaukee
- Atlas Preparatory Academy, Milwaukee
- Believers in Christ Academy High School, Milwaukee
- Cristo Rey Jesuit High School, Milwaukee
- Destiny High School, Milwaukee
- Divine Savior Holy Angels High School, Milwaukee
- Dominican High School, Whitefish Bay
- Early View Academy, Milwaukee
- Eastbrook Academy, Milwaukee
- El Puente High School, Milwaukee
- Holy Redeemer Christian Academy, Milwaukee
- Kingdom Prep Lutheran High School, Wauwatosa
- Kradwell School, Wauwatosa
- Marquette University High School, Milwaukee
- Martin Luther High School, Greendale
- Messmer High School, Milwaukee
- Milwaukee Lutheran High School, Milwaukee
- Milwaukee Spectrum School, Milwaukee
- Pius XI High School, Milwaukee
- St. Anthony High School, Milwaukee
- St. Augustine Preparatory Academy
  - North campus, Glendale
  - South campus, Milwaukee
- St. Joan Antida High School, Milwaukee
- Saint Thomas More High School, Saint Francis
- Salam School, Milwaukee
- Shalom High School, Milwaukee
- Torah Academy of Milwaukee (TAM), Glendale
- University School of Milwaukee, River Hills
- Wisconsin Institute for Torah Study, Milwaukee
- Wisconsin Lutheran High School, Milwaukee

==== Former private schools ====
- Afro Urban Institute, Milwaukee (closed 2006)
- Concordia Preparatory High School, Milwaukee (closed 1971)
- de Sales Preparatory High School, St. Francis (closed 1979)
- Don Bosco High School, Milwaukee (closed 1972, merged into Saint Thomas More High School)
- Francis Jordan High School, Milwaukee (closed 1969)
- HOPE Christian School, Milwaukee (discontinued high school curriculum in 2022)
- Mercy High School, Milwaukee (closed 1973)
- Milwaukee-Downer Seminary, Milwaukee (closed 1964, merged into University School of Milwaukee)
- Milwaukee Country Day School, Whitefish Bay (closed 1964, merged into University School of Milwaukee)
- Milwaukee University School, River Hills (closed 1964, merged into University School of Milwaukee)
- Notre Dame High School, Milwaukee (closed 1988)
- Parkway Christian Academy, Oak Creek (closed 2009)
- Pio Nono High School, St. Francis (closed 1972, merged into Saint Thomas More High School)
- St. Benedict the Moor High School, Milwaukee (closed 1964)
- St. Francis Minor Seminary, Saint Francis (closed 1963)
- St. John's Cathedral High School, Milwaukee (closed 1976)
- St. John's School for the Deaf, Saint Francis (closed 1983)
- St. Mary's Academy, Milwaukee (closed 1991)

== Monroe County ==
=== Public and charter high schools ===
==== Current public schools ====
- Brookwood High School, Ontario
- Cashton High School, Cashton
- Sparta High School, Sparta
- Tomah High School, Tomah

==== Current charter schools ====
- High Point Charter School, Sparta

==== Former public and charter schools ====
- Kendall High School, Kendall (closed 1959, merged into Royall)
- Norwalk High School, Norwalk (closed 1960, merged into Brookwood)
- Wilton High School, Wilton (closed 1963, folded into Royall)

== Oconto County ==
=== Public high schools ===
==== Current public schools ====
- Gillett High School, Gillett
- Lena High School, Lena
- Oconto Falls High School, Oconto Falls
- Oconto High School, Oconto
- Suring High School, Suring

==== Former public schools ====
- Mountain High School, Mountain (closed 1948, folded into Suring)

== Oneida County ==
=== Public high schools ===
==== Current public schools ====
- Lakeland Union High School, Minocqua
- Rhinelander High School, Rhinelander
- Three Lakes High School, Three Lakes

==== Former public schools ====
- Minocqua High School, Minocqua (closed 1957, merged into Lakeland Union)

== Outagamie County ==
=== Public high schools ===
==== Appleton Area School District ====
- Appleton Technical Academy
- Appleton East High School
- Appleton North High School
- Appleton West High School
- Valley New School

==== Other current public schools ====
- Freedom High School, Freedom
- Hortonville High School, Hortonville
- Kaukauna High School, Kaukauna
- Kimberly High School, Kimberly
- Little Chute High School, Little Chute
- Oneida Nation High School, Oneida
- Seymour Community High School, Seymour
- Shiocton High School, Shiocton

==== Former public schools ====
- Bear Creek High School, Bear Creek (closed 1969, folded into Clintonville)
- Little Chute High School (original), Little Chute (closed 1931, folded into Appleton and Kaukauna)
- Ryan High School, Appleton (closed 1903, merged into current Appleton West)
- Third Ward High School, Appleton (closed 1903, merged into current Appleton West)

=== Private high schools ===
==== Current private schools ====
- Fox Valley Lutheran High School, Appleton
- St. Ignatius Chesterton Academy, Kaukauna
- Xavier High School, Appleton

==== Former private schools ====
- Appleton Christian School, Appleton (closed 2000, merged into Valley Christian)
- Sacred Heart Seminary High School, Oneida (closed 1976)
- St. John High School, Little Chute (closed 1973)

== Ozaukee County ==
=== Public high schools ===
==== Current public schools ====
- Cedarburg High School, Cedarburg
- Grafton High School, Grafton
- Homestead High School, Mequon
- Ozaukee High School, Fredonia
- Port Washington High School, Port Washington

== Pepin County ==
=== Public high schools ===
==== Current public schools ====
- Durand-Arkansaw High School, Durand
- Pepin High School, Pepin

==== Former public schools ====
- Arkansaw High School, Arkansaw (closed 1992, merged into Durand-Arkansaw)

=== Private high schools ===
==== Former private schools ====
- Sacred Heart High School, Lima (closed 1966)

== Pierce County ==
=== Public high schools ===
==== Current public schools ====
- Ellsworth High School, Ellsworth
- Elmwood High School, Elmwood
- Plum City High School, Plum City
- Prescott High School, Prescott
- River Falls High School, River Falls
- Spring Valley High School, Spring Valley

==== Former high schools ====
- Maiden Rock High School, Maiden Rock (closed 1956, folded into Ellsworth)

== Polk County ==
=== Public high schools ===
==== Current public schools ====
- Amery High School, Amery
- Clayton High School, Clayton
- Clear Lake High School, Clear Lake
- Frederic High School, Frederic
- Luck High School, Luck
- Osceola High School, Osceola
- Saint Croix Falls High School, Saint Croix Falls
- Unity High School, Balsam Lake

==== Former public schools ====
- Balsam Lake High School, Balsam Lake (closed 1957, merged into Unity)
- Centuria High School, Centuria (closed 1957, merged into Unity)
- Milltown High School, Milltown (closed 1957, merged into Unity)

=== Private high schools ===
==== Current private schools ====
- Valley Christian School, Osceola

== Portage County ==
=== Public high schools ===
==== Current public schools ====
- Almond-Bancroft High School, Almond
- Amherst High School, Amherst
- Point of Discovery School (Wisconsin), Stevens Point
- Rosholt High School, Rosholt
- Stevens Point Area Senior High School, Stevens Point

==== Former public schools ====
- Bancroft High School, Bancroft (closed 1948, folded into Stevens Point)

=== Private high schools ===
==== Current private schools ====
- Pacelli High School, Stevens Point

== Price County ==
=== Public high schools ===
==== Current public schools ====
- Chequamegon High School, Park Falls
- Phillips High School, Phillips
- Prentice High School, Prentice

==== Former public schools ====
- Fifield High School, Fifield (closed 1962, folded into Park Falls)
- Park Falls High School, Park Falls

== Racine County ==
=== Public high schools ===
==== Racine Unified School District ====
- Jerome I. Case High School
- Walden III Middle/High School
- Washington Park High School
- William Horlick High School

==== Other current public schools ====
- Burlington High School, Burlington
- Union Grove High School, Union Grove
- Waterford Union High School, Waterford

==== Former public schools ====
- Racine County School of Agriculture and Domestic Science, Rochester (closed 1959)
- Racine High School, Racine (closed 1928, split into Washington Park and William Horlick)

=== Private high schools ===
==== Current private schools ====
- Burlington Catholic Central High School, Burlington
- Racine Lutheran High School, Racine
- St. Catherine's High School, Racine
- The Prairie School, Wind Point

==== Former private schools ====
- St. Bonaventure High School, Sturtevant (closed 1983)
- Union Grove Christian School, Union Grove (closed 2018)

== Richland County ==
=== Public high schools ===
==== Current public schools ====
- Ithaca High School, Richland Center
- Richland Center High School, Richland Center

==== Former public schools ====
- Cazenovia High School, Cazenovia (closed 1955, merged into Weston)
- Lone Rock High School, Lone Rock (closed 1962, merged into River Valley)
- Sextonville High School, Sextonville (closed 1942, folded into Richland Center and Ithaca)
- Viola High School, Viola (closed 1964, merged into Kickapoo)
- West Lima High School, West Lima (closed 1964, merged into Kickapoo)

=== Private high schools ===
==== Current private schools ====
- Eagle School, Richland Center

== Rock County ==
=== Public and charter high schools ===
==== Current public schools ====
- Beloit Learning Academy, Beloit
- Beloit Memorial High School, Beloit
- Clinton High School, Clinton
- Edgerton High School, Edgerton
- Evansville High School, Evansville
- Frederick J. Turner High School, Town of Beloit
- George S. Parker High School, Janesville
- Joseph A. Craig High School, Janesville
- Milton High School, Milton
- Parkview High School, Orfordville
- Wisconsin School for the Blind and Visually Impaired, Janesville

==== Current charter schools ====
- Arise Virtual Academy, Janesville
- The Lincoln Academy, Beloit
- Rock River Charter School, Janesville
- Rock University High School, Janesville

==== Former public and charter schools ====
- Milton High School (original), Milton (closed 1920, merged into current Milton)
- Milton Junction High School, Milton Junction (closed 1920, merged into current Milton)

=== Private high schools ===
==== Current private schools ====
- Oakhill Christian School, Janesville
- Rock County Christian School, Beloit

==== Former private schools ====
- Beloit Catholic High School, Beloit (closed 2000)
- St. Joseph Seminary High School, Edgerton (closed 1980)

== Rusk County ==
=== Public high schools ===
==== Current public schools ====
- Bruce High School, Bruce
- Flambeau High School, Tony
- Ladysmith High School, Ladysmith

==== Former public schools ====
- Hawkins High School, Hawkins (closed 1967, folded into Ladysmith)
- Ingram-Glen Flora High School, Glen Flora (closed 1961, merged into Flambeau)
- Tony High School, Tony (closed 1961, merged into Flambeau)
- Weyerhaeuser High School, Weyerhaeuser (closed 2010, merged into Chetek-Weyerhaeuser)

== St. Croix County ==
=== Public high schools ===
==== Current public schools ====
- Baldwin-Woodville High School, Baldwin
- Glenwood City High School, Glenwood City
- Hudson High School, Hudson
- New Richmond High School, New Richmond
- St. Croix Central High School, Hammond
- Somerset High School, Somerset

==== Former public schools ====
- Hammond High School, Hammond (closed 1960, merged into St. Croix Central)
- Roberts High School, Roberts (closed 1960, merged into St. Croix Central)
- Woodville High School, Woodville (closed 1961, merged into Baldwin-Woodville)

== Sauk County ==
=== Public high schools ===
==== Current public schools ====
- Baraboo High School, Baraboo
- Reedsburg Area High School, Reedsburg
- River Valley High School, Spring Green
- Sauk Prairie High School, Prairie du Sac
- Weston High School, Cazenovia
- Wisconsin Dells High School, Wisconsin Dells

==== Former public schools ====
- Lime Ridge High School, Lime Ridge (closed 1955, merged into Weston)
- North Freedom High School, North Freedom (closed 1945, folded into Baraboo and Reedsburg)
- Prairie du Sac High School, Prairie du Sac (closed 1963, merged into Sauk Prairie)
- Sauk City High School, Sauk City (closed 1963, merged into Sauk Prairie)
- Spring Green High School, Spring Green (closed 1962, merged into River Valley)

=== Private high schools ===
==== Current private schools ====
- Community Christian School, Baraboo

== Sawyer County ==
=== Public high schools ===
==== Current public schools ====
- Hayward High School, Hayward
- Lac Courte Oreilles Ojibwe High School, Hayward
- Winter High School, Winter

==== Former public schools ====
- Draper-Loretta High School, Draper (closed 1952, folded into Winter)

== Shawano County ==
=== Public high schools ===
==== Current public schools ====
- Bonduel High School, Bonduel
- Bowler High School, Bowler
- Gresham School, Gresham
- Shawano Community High School, Shawano
- Tigerton High School, Tigerton
- Wittenberg-Birnamwood High School, Wittenberg

==== Former public schools ====
- Birnamwood High School, Birnamwood (closed 1970, merged into Wittenberg-Birnamwood)
- Mattoon High School, Mattoon (closed 1962, folded into Shawano)
- Wittenberg High School, Wittenberg (closed 1970, merged into Wittenberg-Birnamwood)

=== Private high schools ===
==== Current private schools ====
- Wolf River Lutheran High School, Shawano

== Sheboygan County ==
=== Public high schools ===
==== Sheboygan Area Public Schools ====
- Central High School
- Étude High School
- Sheboygan North High School
- Sheboygan South High School
- George D. Warriner High School for Personalized Learning

==== Current public schools ====
- Cedar Grove-Belgium High School, Cedar Grove
- Elkhart Lake-Glenbeulah High School, Elkhart Lake
- Howards Grove High School, Howards Grove
- Kohler High School, Kohler
- Oostburg High School, Oostburg
- Plymouth High School, Plymouth
- Random Lake High School, Random Lake
- Sheboygan Falls High School, Sheboygan Falls

==== Former public schools ====
- Glenbeulah High School, Glenbeulah (closed 1957, merged into Elkhart Lake-Glenbeulah)
- Waldo High School, Waldo (closed 1962, folded into Sheboygan Falls)

=== Private high schools ===
==== Current private schools ====
- Sheboygan County Christian High School, Sheboygan
- Sheboygan Area Lutheran High School, Sheboygan

== Taylor County ==
=== Public high schools ===
==== Current public schools ====
- Gilman High School, Gilman
- Medford Area Senior High School, Medford
- Rib Lake High School, Rib Lake

==== Former public schools ====
- Hannibal High School, Hannibal (closed 1956, folded into Gilman)
- Westboro High School, Westboro (closed 1967, folded into Rib Lake)

== Trempealeau County ==
=== Public high schools ===
==== Current public schools ====
- Arcadia High School, Arcadia
- Blair-Taylor High School, Blair
- Eleva-Strum Central High School, Strum
- Gale-Ettrick-Trempealeau High School, Galesville
- Independence High School, Independence
- Osseo-Fairchild High School, Osseo
- Whitehall High School, Whitehall

==== Former public schools ====
- Blair High School, Blair (closed 1989, merged into Blair-Taylor)
- Eleva High School, Eleva (closed 1948, merged into Eleva-Strum)
- Gale-Ettrick High School, Galesville (closed 1971, merged into Gale-Ettrick-Trempealeau)
- Galesville High School, Galesville (closed 1949, merged into Gale-Ettrick)
- Strum High School, Strum (closed 1948, merged into Eleva-Strum)
- Trempealeau High School, Trempealeau (closed 1971, merged into Gale-Ettrick-Trempealeau)

== Vernon County ==
=== Public and charter high schools ===
==== Current public schools ====
- De Soto High School, De Soto
- Hillsboro High School, Hillsboro
- Kickapoo High School, Viola
- La Farge High School, La Farge
- Viroqua High School, Viroqua
- Westby Area High School, Westby

==== Current charter schools ====
- Better Futures High School, Viroqua
- Laurel High School, Viroqua

==== Former public and charter schools ====
- Ontario High School, Ontario (closed 1960, merged into Brookwood)
- Readstown High School, Readstown (closed 1964, merged into Kickapoo)

=== Private high schools ===
==== Current private schools ====
- Cornerstone Christian Academy, Viroqua
- Youth Initiative High School, Viroqua

== Vilas County ==
=== Public high schools ===
==== Current public schools ====
- Northland Pines High School, Eagle River
- Phelps High School, Phelps

==== Former public schools ====
- Arbor Vitae High School (closed 1913)
- Lac du Flambeau Indian School (discontinued high school curriculum, 1948)
- Woodruff-Arbor Vitae High School (closed 1957, merged into Lakeland Union)

=== Private high schools ===
==== Former private schools ====
- Conserve School, Land O'Lakes (closed 2020)

== Walworth County ==
=== Public high schools ===
==== Current public schools ====
- Badger High School, Lake Geneva
- Big Foot High School, Walworth
- Delavan-Darien High School, Delavan
- East Troy High School, East Troy
- Elkhorn Area High School, Elkhorn
- Whitewater High School, Whitewater
- Williams Bay High School, Williams Bay
- Wisconsin School for the Deaf, Delavan

==== Former public schools ====
- College High School, Whitewater (closed 1959, folded into Whitewater)
- Darien High School, Darien (closed 1957, merged into Delavan-Darien)
- Genoa City High School, Genoa City (closed 1958, merged into Badger)
- Lake Geneva High School, Lake Geneva (closed 1958, merged into Badger)
- Sharon High School, Sharon (closed 1958, merged into Big Foot)
- Walworth High School, Walworth (closed 1958, merged into Big Foot)

=== Private high schools ===
==== Current private schools ====
- Faith Christian High School, Williams Bay

==== Former private schools ====
- Divine Word Seminary High School, East Troy (closed 1991)
- Northwestern Military and Naval Academy, town of Linn (closed 1995, merged into St. John's Northwestern)

== Washburn County ==
=== Public high schools ===
==== Current public schools ====
- Birchwood High School, Birchwood
- Northwood High School, Minong
- Shell Lake High School, Shell Lake
- Spooner High School, Spooner

== Washington County ==
=== Public high schools ===
==== Current public schools ====
- Germantown High School, Germantown
- Hartford Union High School, Hartford
- Kewaskum High School, Kewaskum
- Slinger High School, Slinger
- West Bend East High School, West Bend (closing 2027, merging into single West Bend High School)
- West Bend West High School, West Bend (closing 2027, merging into single West Bend High School)

==== Former public schools ====
- West Bend High School (original), West Bend (closed 1970, split into West Bend East and West Bend West)

=== Private high schools ===
==== Current private schools ====
- Kettle Moraine Lutheran High School, Jackson
- Living Word Lutheran High School, Jackson

== Waukesha County ==
=== Public high schools ===
==== School District of Waukesha ====
- Waukesha East Alternative School
- Waukesha North High School
- Waukesha South High School
- Waukesha West High School

==== Other current public schools ====
- Arrowhead High School, Hartland
- Brookfield Central High School, Brookfield
- Brookfield East High School, Brookfield
- Hamilton High School, Sussex
- Kettle Moraine High School, Wales
- Menomonee Falls High School, Menomonee Falls
- Mukwonago High School, Mukwonago
- Muskego High School, Muskego
- New Berlin Eisenhower Middle/High School, New Berlin
- New Berlin West High School, New Berlin
- Norris Academy, Mukwonago
- Oconomowoc High School, Oconomowoc
- Pewaukee High School, Pewaukee

==== Former public schools ====
- Ethan Allen School for Boys, Wales (closed 2011)
- Hartland High School, Hartland (closed 1956, succeeded by Arrowhead)
- Menomonee Falls East High School, Menomonee Falls (closed 1984, merged into Menomonee Falls)
- Menomonee Falls North High School, Menomonee Falls (closed 1984, merged into Menomonee Falls)

=== Private high schools ===
==== Current private schools ====
- Brookfield Academy, Brookfield
- Catholic Memorial High School, Waukesha
- Chesterton Academy of Milwaukee, Menomonee Falls
- Heritage Christian School, New Berlin
- Lake Country Classical Academy, Oconomowoc
- Lake Country Lutheran High School, Hartland
- St. John's Northwestern Military Academy, Delafield
- Trinity Academy, Pewaukee
- University Lake School, Hartland
- Waukesha Christian Academy, Waukesha

==== Former private schools ====
- Calvary Baptist High School, Menomonee Falls (closed 2024)
- Mount St. Paul Seminary High School, Waukesha (closed 1968)
- St. Columban Seminary High School, Oconomowoc (discontinued high school curriculum in 1966)

== Waupaca County ==
=== Public high schools ===
==== Current public schools ====
- Clintonville High School, Clintonville
- Iola-Scandinavia High School, Iola
- Manawa High/Middle School, Manawa
- Marion High School, Marion
- New London High School, New London
- Waupaca High School, Waupaca
- Weyauwega-Fremont High School, Weyauwega

==== Former public schools ====
- Iola High School, Iola (closed 1960, merged into Iola-Scandinavia)
- Scandinavia High School, Scandinavia (closed 1960, merged into Iola-Scandinavia)

=== Private high schools ===
==== Current private schools ====
- Starr Academy, New London

==== Former private schools ====
- Blessed Sacrament Seminary High School, Waupaca (closed 1971)

== Waushara County ==
=== Public high schools ===
==== Current public schools ====
- Tri-County High School, Plainfield
- Wautoma High School, Wautoma
- Wild Rose High School, Wild Rose

==== Former public schools ====
- Coloma High School, Coloma (closed 1946, folded into Westfield)
- Hancock High School, Hancock (closed 1947, merged into Tri-County)
- Plainfield High School, Plainfield (closed 1947, merged into Tri-County)
- Redgranite High School, Redgranite (closed 1948, folded into Berlin and Wautoma)

== Winnebago County ==
=== Public high schools ===
==== Current public schools ====
- Menasha High School, Menasha
- Neenah High School, Neenah
- Omro High School, Omro
- Oshkosh North High School, Oshkosh
- Oshkosh West High School, Oshkosh
- Winneconne High School, Winneconne

=== Private high schools ===
==== Current private schools ====
- Lourdes High School, Oshkosh
- St. Mary Central High School, Neenah
- Valley Christian School, Oshkosh

==== Former private schools ====
- Oshkosh Christian School, Oshkosh (closed 2000, merged into Valley Christian)
- St. Mary High School, Oshkosh (closed 1941)
- St. Peter's High School, Oshkosh (closed 1941)

== Wood County ==
=== Public high schools ===
==== Current public schools ====
- Auburndale High School, Auburndale
- John Edwards High School, Port Edwards
- Lincoln High School, Wisconsin Rapids
- Marshfield High School, Marshfield
- Nekoosa High School, Nekoosa
- Pittsville High School, Pittsville
- River Cities High School, Wisconsin Rapids

==== Former public schools ====
- Rudolph High School, Rudolph (closed 1962, folded into Wisconsin Rapids Lincoln)
- Wood County School of Agriculture and Domestic Science, Wisconsin Rapids (closed 1942)

=== Private high schools ===
==== Current private schools ====
- Assumption High School, Wisconsin Rapids
- Columbus Catholic High School, Marshfield

==== Former private schools ====
- Maryheart High School, Pittsville

== See also ==
- List of school districts in Wisconsin
- List of high school athletic conferences in Wisconsin
