= Chequamegon Forest Football Conference =

Wisconsin high school football conference (1960-1968)

The Chequamegon Forest Football Conference is a former high school athletic conference sponsoring eight-player football in northern Wisconsin. It was formed in 1960 and competed through the 1968 football season, and most of its member schools were affiliated with the Wisconsin Interscholastic Athletic Association.

== History ==
The Chequamegon Forest Football Conference, alternatively known as the Chequamegon Forest League, was founded by five small high schools in northern Wisconsin that sponsored eight-player football: Mellen, Northwood (Minong), Solon Springs, South Shore and Washburn. Three of the original members (Mellen, South Shore and Washburn) were members of the Indianhead Conference, a conference of small schools in the region that did not sponsor football, while Northwood and Solon Springs played as independents. Membership remained consistent for the first five seasons of the conference before DePadua High School, a Catholic high school in Ashland, joined as the conference's sixth member in 1965. Northwood left the conference after the 1965 season to compete as independents and were joined by DePadua in 1966 after two seasons of conference membership. The Chequamegon Forest Football Conference operated with four members for its final two seasons before disbanding after the 1968 football season. The three Indianhead Conference members switched to eleven-player football and formed the nucleus of the seven-member Top of Wisconsin Conference, which began play in the 1969 season and lasted until the 1982 season.

== Conference membership history ==
=== Final members ===
| School | Location | Affiliation | Mascot | Colors | Seasons | Primary Conference |
|---|---|---|---|---|---|---|
| Mellen | Mellen, WI | Public | Granite Diggers | | 1960-1968 | Indianhead |
| Solon Springs | Solon Springs, WI | Public | Eagles | | 1960-1968 | Independent |
| South Shore | Port Wing, WI | Public | Cardinals | | 1960-1968 | Indianhead |
| Washburn | Washburn, WI | Public | Castle Guards | | 1960-1968 | Indianhead |

=== Former members ===
| School | Location | Affiliation | Mascot | Colors | Seasons | Primary Conference |
|---|---|---|---|---|---|---|
| DePadua | Ashland, WI | Private (Catholic) | Bruins | | 1965-1966 | Independent (WCIAA) |
| Northwood | Minong, WI | Public | Evergreens | | 1960-1965 | Independent |

== List of conference champions ==
| School | Quantity | Years |
|---|---|---|
| Washburn | 7 | 1960, 1963, 1964, 1965, 1966, 1967, 1968 |
| Mellen | 2 | 1961, 1962 |
| DePadua | 0 | |
| Northwood | 0 | |
| Solon Springs | 0 | |
| South Shore | 0 | |
