= Top of Wisconsin Conference =

Wisconsin high school football conference (1969-1982)

The Top of Wisconsin Conference is a former high school football conference comprising small high schools in northern Wisconsin. It was founded in 1969 and was in existence through the 1982 football season. All member schools were affiliated with the Wisconsin Interscholastic Athletic Association.

== History ==
The Top of Wisconsin Conference was formed in 1969 in the wake of the dissolution of the Chequamegon Forest Football Conference, which sponsored eight-player football from 1960 to 1968. Three of the conference's former members (Mellen, South Shore and Washburn) were joined by Prentice and three junior varsity programs from the Michigan-Wisconsin Conference (Ashland, Hurley and Northwestern) in forming the initial roster. The conference's four varsity members played both eight-player football against themselves and eleven-player football against the Michigan-Wisconsin Conference JV teams in their early years before making the switch to eleven-player football in the mid-1970s. Hurley's junior varsity program left the conference after one season, and were replaced by new Indianhead Conference members Northwood High School in Minong for the 1970 football season. After the 1971 season, the Top of Wisconsin Conference lost the Northwestern JV program as members, and then Prentice after the 1972 season. The Top of Wisconsin Conference continued on with five members for the rest of the decade, with Northwood leaving for full membership in the Lakeland Conference for the 1980-81 school year. The four remaining members played three more seasons before disbanding after the 1982 football season.

== Conference membership history ==
=== Final members ===
School	Location	Affiliation	Mascot	Colors	Seasons	Primary Conference
Ashland JV	Ashland, WI	Public	Oredockers		1969-1982	Michigan-Wisconsin, Lumberjack
Mellen	Mellen, WI	Public	Granite Diggers		1969-1982	Indianhead
South Shore	Port Wing, WI	Public	Cardinals		1969-1982	Indianhead
Washburn	Washburn, WI	Public	Castle Guards		1969-1982	Indianhead

Former members

School	Location	Affiliation	Mascot	Colors	Seasons	Primary Conference
Hurley JV	Hurley, WI	Public	Midgets		1969	Michigan-Wisconsin
Northwestern JV	Maple, WI	Public	Tigers		1969-1970	Michigan-Wisconsin
Northwood	Minong, WI	Public	Evergreens		1970-1979	Indianhead
Prentice	Prentice, WI	Public	Buccaneers		1969-1971	Flambeau, Lakeland

== List of conference champions ==
School	Quantity	Years
Washburn	6	1969, 1970, 1976, 1980, 1981, 1982
Mellen	5	1971, 1972, 1973, 1974, 1975
South Shore	3	1977, 1978, 1979
Ashland JV	0	
Hurley JV	0	
Northwestern JV	0	
Northwood	0	
Prentice	0	
