= Northern Lights Conference =

Wisconsin high school athletic conference

The Northern Lights Conference is a high school athletic conference located in northwestern Wisconsin. Originally founded as the Bayfield County Athletic League in 1936, the conference's name was changed to its current moniker in 2023, and its members are affiliated with the Wisconsin Interscholastic Athletic Association.

== History ==
=== 1936-1970 ===
Location of Indianhead Conference Members (1948-1964)

The Bayfield County Athletic League was founded in 1936 by six small high schools in far northwestern Wisconsin: Bayfield, Drummond, Iron River, Ondossagon, Port Wing (later South Shore) and Washburn. Cable were also announced as members but did not participate in the conference's first basketball season. Former Upper Wisconsin Conference members Saxon were admitted to the conference 1937, which along with Cable's entry into competition increased membership to eight schools. Along with Saxon's entry into the conference came a new name: the Indianhead Conference. The Indianhead moniker refers to a group of counties in northwestern Wisconsin that resemble the side profile of a Native American. Drummond and Port Wing dropped out of the conference for the 1938 season, and membership stood at six with Cable's addition. In 1940, Mellen joined the conference and Drummond made their return, offsetting the loss of Cable as members. The return of Port Wing in 1943 and Cable in 1948 brought membership up to nine schools by the end of the decade. The Indianhead Conference's roster remained stable at nine schools for sixteen years before rural school district consolidation whittled away at the group. Saxon was the first to leave the conference, consolidating with Hurley of the Michigan-Wisconsin Conference in 1964. Three years later, Iron River was folded into another M-W Conference school (Northwestern High School in Maple). Former independent Solon Springs entered the Indianhead Conference in 1968, offsetting some of the losses suffered in previous seasons. In 1969, Cable was merged into Drummond, bringing membership back down to seven schools. The Indianhead Conference gained four new members in 1970, two from the disbanded Flambeau League (Butternut and Glidden), one from the Michigan-based Porcupine Mountain Conference (Mercer) and a former independent (Northwood).

=== 1970-2023 ===
The Indianhead Conference operated as an eleven-member circuit for ten years before Northwood left to become members of the Lakeland Conference in 1980. Hurley joined the conference in 1986 after competing in the Michigan-based Gogebic Range Conference for the past six years. A year later, the Indianhead Conference briefly began sponsorship of football a few years after the former affiliation of its three football-playing members (the Top of Wisconsin Conference) ceased operations. In 1990, Ondossagon closed its doors and its district was split up among other area districts, decreasing the ledger to ten members. The Indianhead Conference operated at ten schools for nineteen years, including two years where Butternut and Glidden ran a cooperative athletic program from 2007 to 2009. This arrangement ended in 2009 when Glidden was merged with Park Falls of the Marawood Conference to form the new Chequamegon High School, and the new school inherited Park Falls' conference affiliation. Luther L. Wright High School in Ironwood crossed the Michigan-Wisconsin border to join the Indianhead Conference from the Michigan-based Western Peninsula Conference in 2010. Three years later, the Indianhead Conference acquired another cross-border member from Michigan: the Gogebic Miners (a cooperative between Bessemer Johnston and Wakefield-Marenisco). A twelfth school was added to the Indianhead Conference when Lac Courte Oreilles Ojibwe School in Hayward became members in 2021. After the exit of Gogebic and Ironwood Wright in 2022, the Indianhead Conference assumed its current lineup of ten schools.

=== 2023-present ===
Citing the pejorative nature of the Indianhead name, the conference changed its name to the Northern Lights Conference in 2023. The new name was suggested by students at Butternut and Washburn and beat out four other options considered (Great Divide, Great Lakes, Northland and Snowbelt).

== List of conference members ==
=== Current full members ===
School	Location	Affiliation	Enrollment	Mascot	Colors	Joined
Bayfield	Bayfield, WI	Public	121	Trollers		1936
Butternut	Butternut, WI	Public	53	Midgets		1970
Drummond	Drummond, WI	Public	94	Lumberjacks		1936, 1940
Hurley	Hurley, WI	Public	184	Northstars		1986
Lac Courte Oreilles	Hayward, WI	Tribal (Ojibwe)	122	Eagles		2021
Mellen	Mellen, WI	Public	68	Granite Diggers		1940
Mercer	Mercer, WI	Public	28	Tigers		1970
Solon Springs	Solon Springs, WI	Public	101	Eagles		1968
South Shore	Port Wing, WI	Public	61	Cardinals		1936, 1943
Washburn	Washburn, WI	Public	186	Castle Guards		1936

=== Former full members ===
School	Location	Affiliation	Mascot	Colors	Joined	Left	Conference Joined	Current Conference
Butternut/Glidden	Butternut, WI	Public	Midgets		2007	2009	Cooperative ended (Glidden merged into Chequamegon)	
Cable	Cable, WI	Public	Eskimos		1937, 1948	1940, 1969	Closed (consolidated into Drummond)	
Glidden	Glidden, WI	Public	Black Bears		1970	2007	Entered into cooperative with Butternut	
Gogebic	Bessemer, MI	Public	Miners		2013	2022	Independent	
Iron River	Iron River, WI	Public	Wolverines		1936	1967	Closed (consolidated into Northwestern)	
Ironwood	Ironwood, MI	Public	Red Devils		2010	2022	Independent	
Northwood	Minong, WI	Public	Evergreens		1970	1980	Lakeland	
Ondossagon	Ashland, WI	Public	Aggies		1936	1990	Closed (district split between Ashland, Drummond and Washburn)	
Saxon	Saxon, WI	Public	Knights		1937	1964	Closed (consolidated into Hurley)	

== Membership map ==
Northern Lights Conference
Location of Northern Lights Conference full members:
1 Bayfield
2 Butternut
3 Drummond
4 Hurley
5 Lac Courte Oreilles
6 Mellen
7 Mercer
8 Solon Springs
9 South Shore
10 Washburn

== Sponsored sports ==
	Baseball	Boys Basketball	Girls Basketball	Boys Cross Country	Girls Cross Country	Boys Golf	Softball	Boys Track & Field	Girls Track & Field	Girls Volleyball
Bayfield	●	●	●	●	●			●	●	●
Butternut	● (Note: Co-operative with Mercer)	●	●	●	●		●	●	●	●
Drummond	●	●	●	●	●	●	●	●	●	●
Hurley	●	●	●	●	●	●		●	●	●
Lac Courte Oreilles		●	●	●	●			●	●	●
Mellen	●	●	●	●	●	●	●	●	●	●
Mercer		●	●	●	●			●	●	●
Solon Springs	● (Note: Co-operative with Northwood)	●	●	●	●			●	●	●
South Shore	●	●	●	●	●		●	●	●	●
Washburn	●	●	●	●	●	●	●	●	●	●

== List of state champions ==
=== Fall sports ===
Boys Cross Country
School	Year	Division
Drummond	1976	Class C
Drummond	1997	Division 3

Girls Volleyball
School	Year	Division
Bayfield	1977	Class C
Mercer	1988	Class C
Mercer	1992	Division 4
Washburn	2000	Division 3
Washburn	2021	Alternate Season

=== Winter sports ===
None

=== Spring sports ===
Softball
School	Year	Division
Bayfield	1981	Class C
Bayfield	1982	Class C

== List of conference champions ==
=== Boys Basketball ===
School	Quantity	Years
Washburn	32	1946, 1948, 1949, 1950, 1954, 1956, 1957, 1966, 1967, 1969, 1970, 1971, 1975, 1976, 1977, 1980, 1981, 1982, 1983, 1984, 1986, 1987, 1994, 1995, 1996, 2000, 2002, 2003, 2009, 2014, 2015, 2016
Drummond	13	1942, 1947, 1949, 1958, 1959, 1961, 1962, 1963, 1997, 1998, 2012, 2013, 2017
South Shore	11	1954, 1955, 1968, 1969, 1977, 1979, 1999, 2004, 2006, 2007, 2018
Glidden	9	1971, 1972, 1973, 1985, 1986, 1989, 1990, 1992, 1993
Ondossagon	8	1937, 1938, 1939, 1940, 1953, 1964, 1965, 1973
Hurley	7	2001, 2008, 2009, 2010, 2021, 2022, 2026
Bayfield	6	1960, 1977, 1978, 1988, 1991, 2003
Mellen	5	1952, 2005, 2010, 2020, 2025
Solon Springs	4	2016, 2017, 2023, 2024
Mercer	2	1974, 1984
Saxon	2	1941, 1951
Ironwood	1	2019
Butternut	0	
Butternut/ Glidden	0	
Cable	0	
Gogebic Miners	0	
Iron River	0	
Lac Courte Oreilles	0	
Northwood	0	

=== Girls Basketball ===
School	Quantity	Years
Hurley	14	1987, 1988, 2000, 2003, 2006, 2007, 2008, 2009, 2010, 2011, 2012, 2020, 2021, 2022
South Shore	13	1980, 1981, 1983, 1999, 2001, 2002, 2004, 2013, 2014, 2015, 2019, 2023, 2024
Ondossagon	12	1974, 1975, 1976, 1977, 1978, 1979, 1984, 1985, 1986, 1987, 1989, 1990
Washburn	4	2003, 2005, 2017, 2018
Butternut	3	1994, 1996, 1998
Drummond	3	1972, 1973, 1992
Mellen	2	1995, 1997
Mercer	2	1982, 1993
Solon Springs	2	2025, 2026
Bayfield	1	2016
Glidden	1	1991
Butternut/ Glidden	0	
Gogebic Miners	0	
Ironwood	0	
Lac Courte Oreilles	0	
Northwood	0	

=== Football ===
School	Quantity	Years
Hurley	3	1987, 1988, 1989
South Shore		
Washburn		
Champions from 1990 unknown
