= Flag River =

River in northern Wisconsin

Flag River Spencers River
- Location within Wisconsin Location within the United States

Location
- Country: United States
- State: Wisconsin

Physical characteristics
- Source
  - location: Town of Port Wing
  - coordinates: 46.6904932°N 91.2799098°W
- Mouth: Lake Superior
  - location: CDP of Port Wing
  - coordinates: 46.7896571°N 91.3893515°W
  - elevation: 604 ft (184 m)

Basin features
- Tributaries
  - right: East Fork Flag River

The Flag River is a river that flows through Bayfield County, Wisconsin. The source of the river is in the Town of Port Wing within the Moquah Barrens Research Natural Area. The river then flows through the Town of Orienta and back into the Town of Port Wing. From there, it goes past the census-designated place of Port Wing and empties into Lake Superior.

The Flag River State Wildlife Area is directly east of the river.

== See also ==
- List of rivers of Wisconsin
