= Lake City Conference =

Wisconsin high school athletic conference

The Lake City Conference is a high school athletic conference comprising private and charter schools in southeastern Wisconsin. It was founded in 2021 and all current conference members belong to the Wisconsin Interscholastic Athletic Association.

== History ==
The Lake City Conference was formed in 2021 by nine private and charter schools in the Milwaukee metropolitan area. Seven of these schools were located in Milwaukee (Cristo Rey Jesuit, Early View Academy, Eastbrook Academy, Salam, St. Anthony, St. Augustine Prep and Tenor/Veritas) and two were located outside of the city (Chesterton Academy in Menomonee Falls and University Lake School in Hartland). Six of the nine original members were formerly affiliated with the Indian Trails Conference, another conference of mostly private schools in southeastern Wisconsin. Due to the small size of some of the member schools, there are several schools that have cooperative agreements for interscholastic athletics.

The Lake City Conference has grown at a steady pace since it was inaugurated. St. Joan Antida, an all-girls high school on the south side of Milwaukee, joined the Lake City Conference after its first season of competition. 2023 brought two new members to the Lake City Conference: Chesterton Academy and Hmong American Peace Academy, both located in Milwaukee. The next year, two schools exited the conference: Early View Academy (who rejoined the Indian Trails Conference) and Augustine Prep (currently an independent, joining the Woodland Conference in 2026). In 2025, Fuller Collegiate Academy, a charter school in Milwaukee, joined the Lake City Conference as its newest member.

== List of conference members ==
=== Current full members ===
| School | Location | Affiliation | Enrollment | Mascot | Colors | Joined |
|---|---|---|---|---|---|---|
| Chesterton Academy | Menomonee Falls, WI | Private (Catholic) | 174 | Knights | | 2023 |
| Cristo Rey Jesuit | Milwaukee, WI | Private (Catholic, Jesuit) | 445 | Trailblazers | | 2021 |
| Eastbrook Academy | Milwaukee, WI | Private (Nondenominational Christian) | 85 | Warriors | | 2021 |
| Faith Christian School | Williams Bay, WI | Private (Nondenominational Christian) | 78 | Eagles | | 2021 |
| Fuller Collegiate Academy | Milwaukee, WI | Charter | 519 | Lions | | 2025 |
| Hmong American Peace Academy | Milwaukee, WI | Charter | 610 | Mighty Doves | | 2023 |
| Salam | Milwaukee, WI | Private (Islamic) | 307 | Stars | | 2021 |
| St. Anthony | Milwaukee, WI | Private (Catholic) | 569 | Roman Legion | | 2021 |
| St. Joan Antida | Milwaukee, WI | Private (Catholic) | 203 (Girls only) | Jaguars | | 2022 |
| Tenor/Veritas | Milwaukee, WI | Charter | 875 | Titans | | 2021 |
| University Lake School | Hartland, WI | Private (Nonsectarian) | 102 | Lakers | | 2021 |

=== Current associate members ===
| School | Location | Affiliation | Mascot | Colors | Primary Conference | Sport(s) |
|---|---|---|---|---|---|---|
| St. John's Northwestern | Delafield, WI | Private (Nonsectarian, Military) | Lancers | | Midwest Classic | Girls Basketball (co-op with ULS) |
| Trinity Academy | Pewaukee, WI | Private (Catholic) | Sentinels | | Independent | Boys Basketball, Girls Basketball, Boys Cross Country, Girls Cross Country, Boys Soccer (all co-op with ULS) |

=== Former members ===
| School | Location | Affiliation | Mascot | Colors | Joined | Left | Conference Joined | Current Conference |
|---|---|---|---|---|---|---|---|---|
| Augustine Prep South | Milwaukee, WI | Private (Multi-denominational Christian) | Lions | | 2021 | 2024 | Independent | Woodland |
| Early View Academy | Milwaukee, WI | Private (Nondenominational Christian) | Eagles | | 2021 | 2024 | Indian Trails | |

== Membership map ==
Lake City Conference
Location of Lake City Conference full members:
1 Chesterton Academy
2 Cristo Rey Jesuit
3 Eastbrook Academy
4 Faith Christian School
5 Fuller Collegiate Academy
6 Hmong American Peace Academy
7 Salam
8 St. Anthony
9 St. Joan Antida
10 Tenor/Veritas
11 University Lake School

== Sponsored sports ==
| | Boys Basketball | Girls Basketball | Boys Cross Country | Girls Cross Country | Boys Soccer | Girls Soccer | Boys Track & Field | Girls Track & Field | Girls Volleyball |
|---|---|---|---|---|---|---|---|---|---|
| Chesterton Academy | ● | ● | ● | ● | | | | | ● |
| Cristo Rey Jesuit | ● | ● | ● | ● | ● | ● | ● | ● | ● |
| Eastbrook Academy | ● | ● | | | ● | | | ● | ● |
| Faith Christian | ● | ● | ● | ● | ● | | ● | ● | ● |
| Fuller Collegiate Academy | ● | ● | | | | | | | ● |
| Hmong American Peace Academy | ● | ● | ● | ● | ● | ● | ● | ● | ● |
| Salam | ● | ● | ● | ● | ● | ● | ● | ● | ● |
| St. Anthony | ● | ● | ● | ● | ● | ● | ● | ● | ● |
| St. Joan Antida | | ● (Note: Co-operative with Tenor/Veritas) | | | | ● | | | ● |
| Tenor/Veritas | ● (Note: Hosted by Tenor) | | ● (Note: Hosted by Veritas) | ● | ● | ● | ● | ● | ● |
| University Lake School | ● (Note: Co-operative with Trinity Academy) | ● (Note: Co-operative with St. John's Northwestern and Trinity Academy) | ● | ● | ● (Note: Co-operative with Lake Country Classical Academy and Trinity Academy) | ● (Note: Co-operative with Chesterton Academy and Lake Country Classical Academy) | ● | ● | ● (Note: Co-operative with Lake Country Classical Academy) |

== List of state champions ==
=== Fall sports ===
Boys Soccer
| School | Year | Division |
|---|---|---|
| Cristo Rey Jesuit | 2022 | Division 4 |

=== Winter sports ===
None

=== Spring sports ===
None

== List of conference champions ==
=== Boys Basketball ===
| School | Quantity | Years |
|---|---|---|
| Salam | 4 | 2022, 2023, 2024, 2025 |
| Eastbrook Academy | 1 | 2022 |
| Fuller Collegiate Academy | 1 | 2026 |
| Augustine Prep | 0 | |
| Chesterton Academy | 0 | |
| Cristo Rey Jesuit | 0 | |
| Early View Academy | 0 | |
| Faith Christian | 0 | |
| HAPA | 0 | |
| St. Anthony | 0 | |
| Tenor/Veritas | 0 | |
| University Lake/ Trinity Academy | 0 | |

=== Girls Basketball ===
| School | Quantity | Years |
|---|---|---|
| Salam | 3 | 2023, 2024, 2025 |
| Augustine Prep | 1 | 2022 |
| Chesterton Academy | 1 | 2026 |
| Cristo Rey Jesuit | 0 | |
| Early View Academy | 0 | |
| Eastbrook Academy | 0 | |
| Faith Christian | 0 | |
| Fuller Collegiate Academy | 0 | |
| HAPA | 0 | |
| St. Joan Antida/ Tenor/Veritas | 0 | |
| St. Anthony | 0 | |
| University Lake/ St. John’s Northwestern | 0 | |
