= Minong (town), Wisconsin =

Town in Wisconsin, United States

Minong, Wisconsin
- Town
- Town of Minong
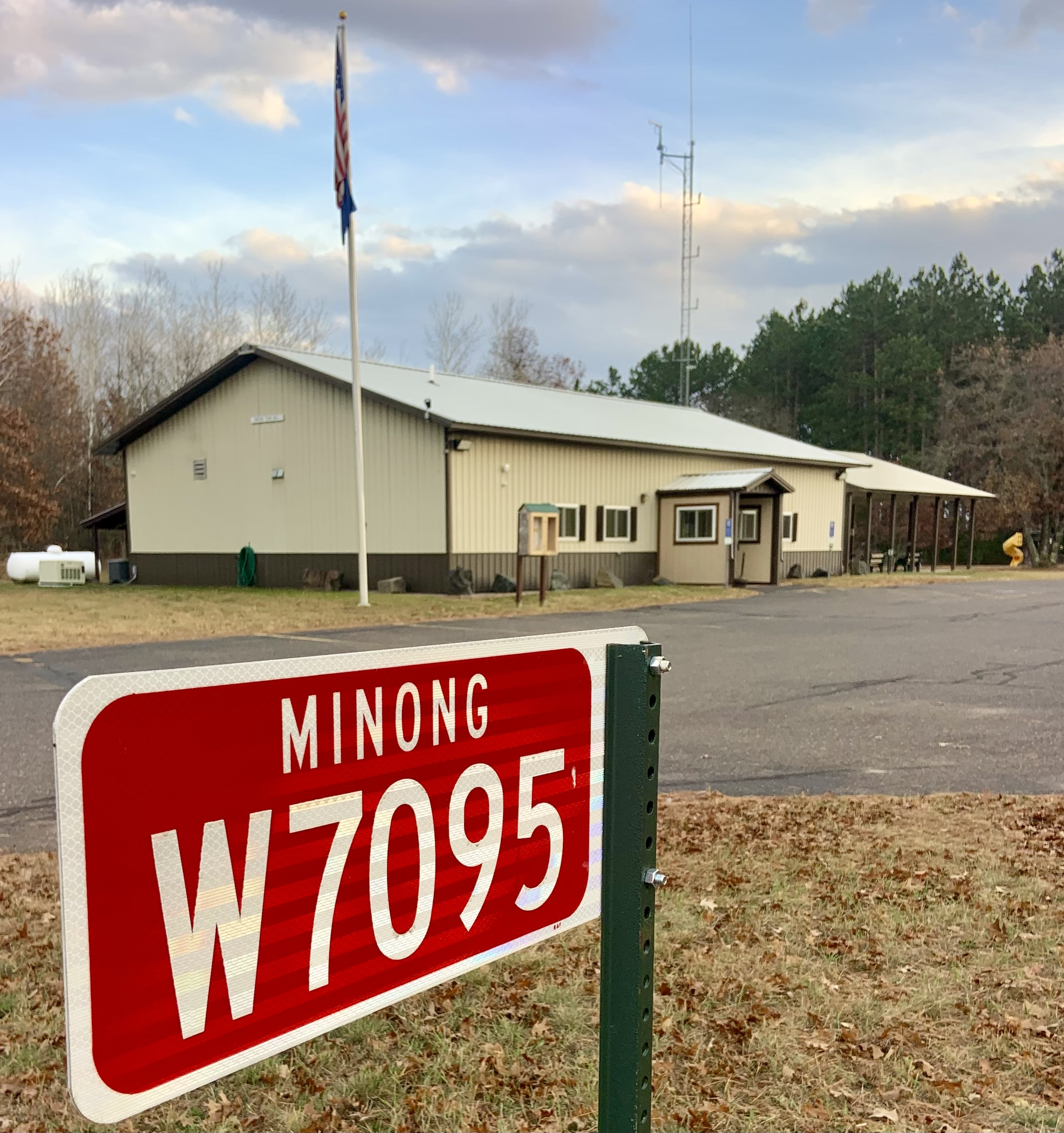
- Minong Town Hall

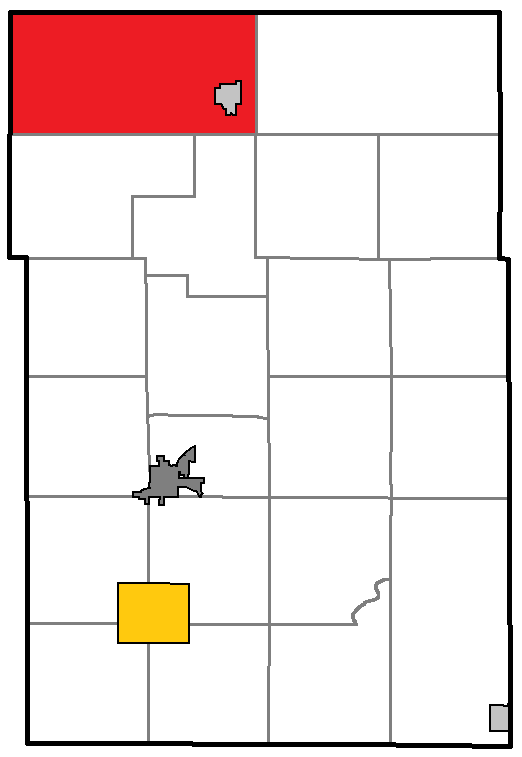
- Location of Minong, within Washburn County
- Coordinates: 46°06′59″N 91°55′37″W
- Country: United States
- State: Wisconsin
- County: Washburn

Area
  - Total: 70.87 sq mi (183.6 km^{2})
  - Land: 63.35 sq mi (164.1 km^{2})
  - Water: 7.52 sq mi (19.5 km^{2})

Population (2020)
  - Total: 984
  - Density: 15.5/sq mi (6.00/km^{2})
- Time zone: UTC-6 (Central (CST))
  - Summer (DST): UTC-5 (CDT)
- Area code(s): 715 & 534
- GNIS feature ID: 1583729

Minong (/ˈmaɪnɒŋ/ MY-nong) is a town in Washburn County, Wisconsin, United States. The population was 984 at the 2020 census. The Village of Minong is located within the town.

== Transportation ==
U.S. Highway 53 and Wisconsin Highway 77 are two of the main routes in the community.

== Geography ==
According to the United States Census Bureau, the town has a total area of 71.0 square miles (183.9 km^{2}), of which 64.2 square miles (166.4 km^{2}) is land and 6.8 square miles (17.5 km^{2}) (9.52%) is water.

== Demographics ==
As of the census of 2000, there were 858 people, 390 households, and 267 families residing in the town. The population density was 13.4 people per square mile (5.2/km^{2}). There were 1,221 housing units at an average density of 19.0 per square mile (7.3/km^{2}). The racial makeup of the town was 98.48% White, 0.12% Black or African American, 0.58% Native American, 0.12% Asian, 0.12% from other races, and 0.58% from two or more races. 0.35% of the population were Hispanic or Latino of any race.

There were 390 households, out of which 18.5% had children under the age of 18 living with them, 59.2% were married couples living together, 6.2% had a female householder with no husband present, and 31.5% were non-families. 24.6% of all households were made up of individuals, and 9.2% had someone living alone who was 65 years of age or older. The average household size was 2.20 and the average family size was 2.60.

In the town, the population was spread out, with 17.6% under the age of 18, 4.0% from 18 to 24, 20.3% from 25 to 44, 35.4% from 45 to 64, and 22.7% who were 65 years of age or older. The median age was 50 years. For every 100 females, there were 101.4 males. For every 100 females age 18 and over, there were 104.3 males.

The median income for a household in the town was $36,667, and the median income for a family was $41,094. Males had a median income of $35,000 versus $23,203 for females. The per capita income for the town was $20,679. About 5.3% of families and 7.9% of the population were below the poverty line, including 12.5% of those under age 18 and 6.3% of those age 65 or over.

== Economy ==
Minong is the location of Jack Link's Snack Food Company, maker of beef jerky.
