= Lake Owen, Wisconsin =

- Unincorporated community
- Location within Wisconsin Location within the United States
- Coordinates: 46°16′05″N 91°15′31″W
- Country: United States
- State: Wisconsin
- County: Bayfield
- Town: Drummond
- Elevation: 1,398 ft (426 m)
- Time zone: UTC-6 (Central (CST))
  - Summer (DST): UTC-5 (CDT)
- Area codes: 715 and 534
- GNIS feature ID: 1581577

Lake Owen is an unincorporated community in the town of Drummond, Bayfield County, Wisconsin, United States. Lake Owen is located on the western shore of Lake Owen, 20.7 miles (33.3 km) north-northeast of Hayward. The community is likely named for John Owen, a founder of the Rust-Owen Lumber Company, and a director of the Drummond & Southwestern Railroad.
