= Drummond (CDP), Wisconsin =

Census-designated place in Wisconsin, United States

Drummond, Wisconsin
- Census-designated place
- Location within Wisconsin
- Coordinates: 46°20′13″N 91°15′29″W
- Country: United States
- State: Wisconsin
- County: Bayfield
- Town: Drummond

Area
  - Total: 1.396 sq mi (3.62 km^{2})
  - Land: 1.396 sq mi (3.62 km^{2})
  - Water: 0 sq mi (0 km^{2})
- Elevation: 1,302 ft (397 m)

Population (2020)
  - Total: 169
  - Density: 121/sq mi (46.7/km^{2})
- Time zone: UTC-6 (Central (CST))
  - Summer (DST): UTC-5 (CDT)
- ZIP code: 54832
- Area codes: 715 and 534
- GNIS feature ID: 1579144

Bear statue by Peter Toch in Drummond, Wisconsin.

Drummond is an unincorporated, census-designated place located in the town of Drummond, Bayfield County, Wisconsin, United States.

U.S. Highway 63 serves as a main route in the community. Drummond is located 31 miles southwest of the city of Ashland; and 26 miles northeast of the city of Hayward.

Drummond has a post office with ZIP code 54832. As of the 2020 census, its population was 169, an increase over the figure of 154 tabulated in 2010.

== History ==
Drummond was founded in 1882. It was named for F. H. Drummond, an executive in the lumber industry. A post office has been in operation in Drummond since 1882.
