= Porcupine Mountain Conference =

Former Michigan high school athletic conference

The Porcupine Mountain Conference is a former high school athletic conference consisting mostly of small schools in the upper peninsula of Michigan. It was founded in 1958 and disbanded in 2015, and its Michigan-based members were affiliated with the Michigan High School Athletic Association. The lone Wisconsin-based member of the Porcupine Mountain Conference belonged to the Wisconsin Interscholastic Athletic Association.

== History ==
=== 1958-1965 ===
Location of Original Porcupine Mountain Conference members

The Porcupine Mountain Conference was founded in 1958 by seven small high schools in Michigan's upper peninsula: Bergland, Ewen, Marenisco, St. Ambrose in Ironwood, Rockland, Trout Creek and Watersmeet. It replaced the Little Six Conference, of which all six public schools were previously members. After the conference's first season, Rockland left as members and were replaced by Mass High School in Mass City. Watersmeet left the Porcupine Mountain Conference's basketball roster in 1960 to compete as an independent, but retained membership for other sports. The entrance of White Pine into the loop in 1961 increased the basketball roster back to seven members. Conference membership reached its high-water mark at nine schools in 1965 when Mercer Public School in Wisconsin joined.

=== 1965-1970 ===
As the Porcupine Mountain Conference entered the second half of the 1960s, it began to lose members to rural school district consolidation in the upper peninsula. Trout Creek left the conference in 1966 to compete as an independent, one year before its merger with Ewen. The new school (Ewen-Trout Creek) inherited their predecessors' membership when they opened in 1967. That same year, St. Ambrose High School merged with St. Paul High School in Negaunee to create the new Ironwood Catholic High School, which continued St. Ambrose's PMC membership. In 1968, Mass left the loop after consolidation into the Ontonagon school district. Two years later, Mercer left the Porcupine Mountain Conference when it was invited to join the Wisconsin-based Indianhead Conference as members.

=== 1970-2015 ===
Location of Final Porcupine Mountain Conference members

After Mercer's exit, the Porcupine Mountain Conference entered a period of roster stability before further changes occurred in the 1980s. It started in 1984 when Bergland closed, and their high school students were redistricted to Wakefield before the district was consolidated into Ewen-Trout Creek in 1985. Ironwood Catholic High School also closed that year, and membership dropped to its low point of four schools. In 1990, the Porcupine Mountain Conference added Bessemer and Wakefield after both schools left the Great Western Conference. The PMC stayed at six schools throughout the 1990s, until White Pine High School was closed and its district consolidated into Ontonagon in 2003. The merger of Wakefield and Marenisco in 2004 brought membership to its final roster of four schools. The Porcupine Mountain Conference ceased operations in 2015 when its members were absorbed into the Copper Country Conference, but the name lives on as the Porcupine Mountain division.

== Conference membership history ==
=== Final members ===
School	Location	Affiliation	Enrollment	Mascot	Colors	Joined	Left	Conference Joined	Current Conference
Bessemer	Bessemer, MI	Public	109	Speedboys		1990	2015	Copper Country	
Ewen-Trout Creek	Ewen, MI	Public	58	Panthers		1967	2015	Copper Country	
Wakefield-Marenisco	Wakefield, MI	Public	88	Cardinals		2004	2015	Copper Country	
Watersmeet	Watersmeet, MI	Public	48	Nimrods		1958	2015	Copper Country	

=== Previous members ===
School	Location	Affiliation	Enrollment	Mascot	Colors	Joined	Left	Conference Joined	Current Conference
Bergland	Bergland, MI	Public	N/A	Vikings		1958	1984	Closed (folded into Ewen-Trout Creek)	
Ewen	Ewen, MI	Public	N/A	Bulldogs		1958	1967	Closed (merged with Trout Creek)	
Ironwood Catholic	Ironwood, MI	Private (Catholic)	N/A	Ramblers		1967	1985	Closed	
Marenisco	Marenisco, MI	Public	N/A	Milltowners		1958	2004	Closed (merged with Wakefield)	
Mass	Mass City, MI	Public	N/A	Rockets		1959	1968	Closed (folded into Ontonagon)	
Mercer	Mercer, WI	Public	41	Tigers		1965	1970	Indianhead (WIAA)	Northern Lights (WIAA)
Rockland	Rockland, MI	Public	N/A	Blackhawks		1958	1959	Independent	Closed in 1965 (folded into Ontonagon)
St. Ambrose	Ironwood, MI	Private (Catholic)	N/A	Ramblers		1958	1967	Closed (merged with Negaunee St. Paul)	
Trout Creek	Trout Creek, MI	Public	N/A	Anglers		1958	1966	Independent	Closed in 1967 (merged with Ewen)
Wakefield	Wakefield, MI	Public	N/A	Cardinals		1990	2004	Closed (merged with Marenisco)	
White Pine	White Pine, MI	Public	N/A	Warriors		1961	2003	Closed (folded into Ontonagon)	

== List of state champions ==
=== Fall sports ===
Girls Basketball
School	Year	Division	Organization
Ewen-Trout Creek	1973	Class D	MHSAA

=== Winter sports ===
Boys Basketball
School	Year	Division	Organization
Ewen-Trout Creek	1972	Class D	MHSAA

Spring sports

Boys Golf
School	Year	Division	Organization
Ewen-Trout Creek	1992	Class C-D (UP)	MHSAA
Ewen-Trout Creek	1993	Class C-D (UP)	MHSAA
Ewen-Trout Creek	2000	Class D (UP)	MHSAA
Ewen-Trout Creek	2001	Division 3 (UP)	MHSAA
Ewen-Trout Creek	2005	Division 3 (UP)	MHSAA

== List of conference champions ==
=== Boys Basketball ===
School	Quantity	Years
Ewen-Trout Creek	29	1968, 1972, 1974, 1979, 1980, 1981, 1982, 1983, 1984, 1986, 1987, 1991, 1992, 1993, 1995, 1998, 1999, 2000, 2001, 2002, 2003, 2004, 2007, 2008, 2009, 2010, 2011, 2012, 2013
Bergland	7	1960, 1969, 1970, 1975, 1976, 1977, 1978
Bessemer	6	1996, 1997, 1998, 1999, 2014, 2015
Watersmeet	5	1989, 1990, 1994, 2005, 2006
White Pine	5	1962, 1971, 1973, 1979, 1988
Trout Creek	4	1959, 1961, 1964, 1966
Mass	3	1963, 1964, 1965
Ironwood Catholic	2	1979, 1985
Ewen	1	1967
Marenisco	0	
Mercer	0	
Rockland	0	
St.Ambrose	0	
Wakefield	0	
Wakefield-Marenisco	0	
