= George D. Warriner High School for Personalized Learning =

High school in Sheboygan, Wisconsin, US

George D. Warriner High School
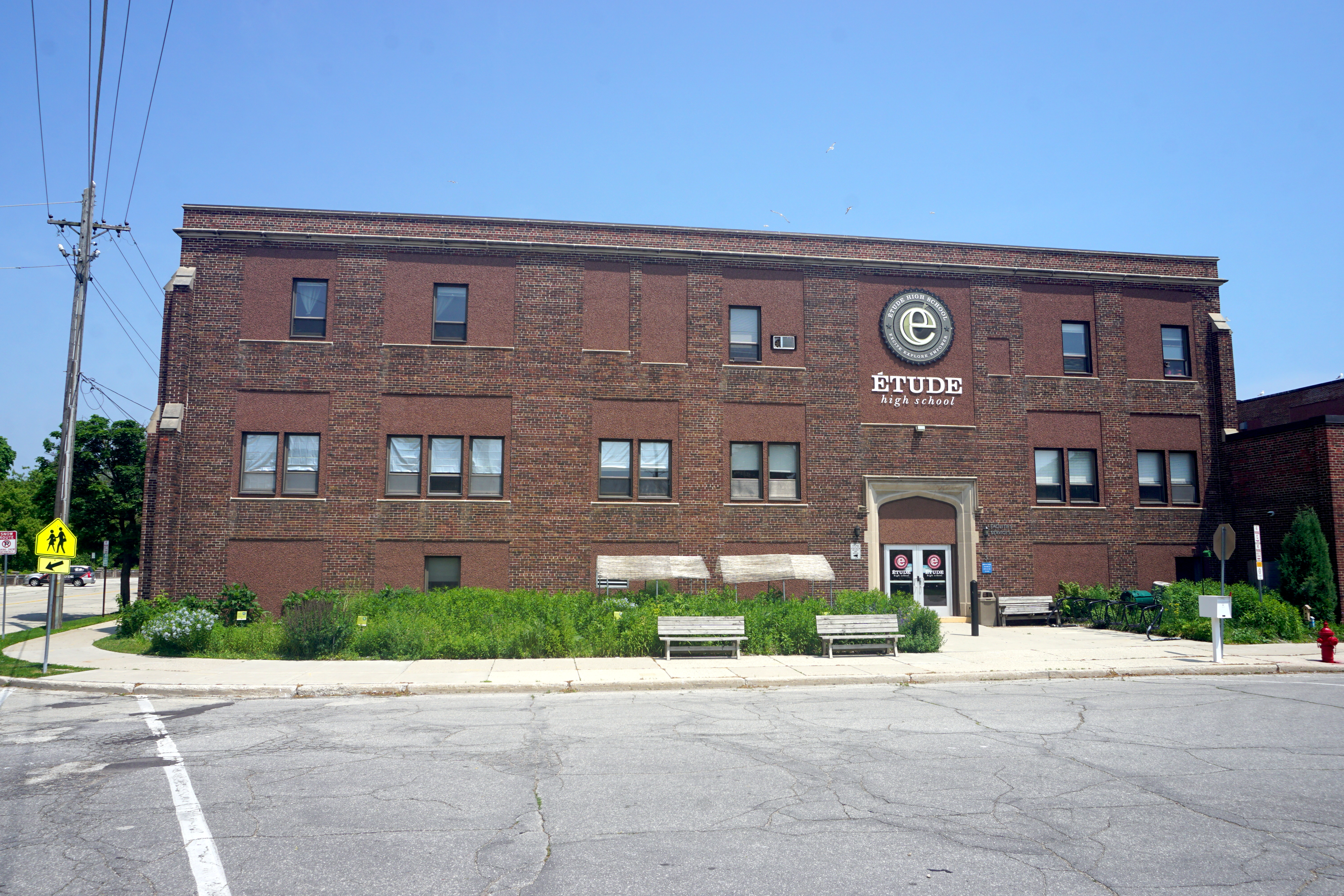

Location
- 830 Virginia Ave; Sheboygan, Wisconsin; United States
- 43°45′3″N 87°42′52″W

Information
- School type: Charter High School
- Established: 2007
- Founders: George D. Warriner
- School district: Sheboygan Area School District
- Principal: Jason Duff
- Grades: 9 through 12
- Enrollment: 116(2025-2026)
- Color
- Mascot: Penguin
- Website: warriner.sheboygan.k12.wi.us

George D. Warriner High School for Personalized Learning is a public high school in Sheboygan, Wisconsin. Established in 2007, the school serves students in grades 9-12 and is part of the Sheboygan Area School District.

== History ==
Warriner High School opened in 2007 as Face 2 Face Charter School with a student enrollment of 20 students. The school changed its name when its founder, George D. Warriner, died in 2008.

The school was first located at St. Clement Parish. Before eventually moving to the former Sheboygan County Chamber of Commerce office. Recently they recently moved to a new building at 830 Virginia Ave in between the 2021-2022 and 2022-2023 school years.

George D. Warriner Middle School is also located at 830 Virginia Ave.

== Clubs ==
The school offers three clubs, one being an Art Club that does work on murals around the campus, another being the Warriner Esports Team, which allows both middle and high schooler players, and one being a Dungeons and Dragons club that offers an experience for new and experienced players.

== See also ==
- Sheboygan Area School District
- List of high schools in Wisconsin
