= Herbster, Wisconsin =

Census-designated place in Wisconsin, United States

- Census-designated place
- Location within Wisconsin
- Coordinates: 46°49′57″N 91°15′39″W
- Country: United States
- State: Wisconsin
- County: Bayfield

Area
  - Total: 5.572 sq mi (14.43 km^{2})
  - Land: 5.572 sq mi (14.43 km^{2})
  - Water: 0 sq mi (0 km^{2})
- Elevation: 623 ft (190 m)

Population (2020)
  - Total: 130
  - Density: 23/sq mi (9.0/km^{2})
- Time zone: UTC-6 (Central (CST))
  - Summer (DST): UTC-5 (CDT)
- ZIP code: 54844
- Area codes: 715 and 534
- GNIS feature ID: 1566314

Herbster is a census-designated place (CDP) in the Town of Clover in Bayfield County, Wisconsin, United States, located on the south shore of Lake Superior. As of the 2020 census, Herbster had a population of 130. Herbster is 7 miles (11 km) east of Port Wing and 8 miles (13 km) west of Cornucopia on Wisconsin Highway 13, the main route through the community. The primary north/south route is by Lenawee Road / Forest Road 262, leading from Lake Superior to the Chequamegon National Forest.

== Geography ==
As of the 2020 census, Herbster's population was 130, an increase over the figure of 104 tabulated in 2010. Herbster has an area of 5.572 square miles (14.43 km^{2}), all land.

The Cranberry River joins the lake in the middle of the community. The unique ecosystems of Bark Point and Bark Bay sit just to the east of Herbster.

Herbster's ZIP code is 54844.

== History ==
According to legend, Herbster was named after a logger, Billy Herbster.

Herbster School closed its doors in 1990, but its historic log gymnasium remains open as a community center and town hall. School children from Herbster now attend school in Port Wing at South Shore School District.

== Economy ==
Logging remained the force in Herbster's economy throughout the 20th century, driven by the Isaksson family, who still operate the sawmill and remain the largest landowners in the area. Today, service trades and a growing tourist industry have emerged as major players in the Herbster economy.

Herbster has one restaurant at the crossroad of Lenawee Road and Highway 13. There are gift shops along Highway 13. Master cabinetmaker Howard Bowers ran a woodworking shop until his death in 2009.
