= Port Wing (town), Wisconsin =

Port Wing, Wisconsin
- Town
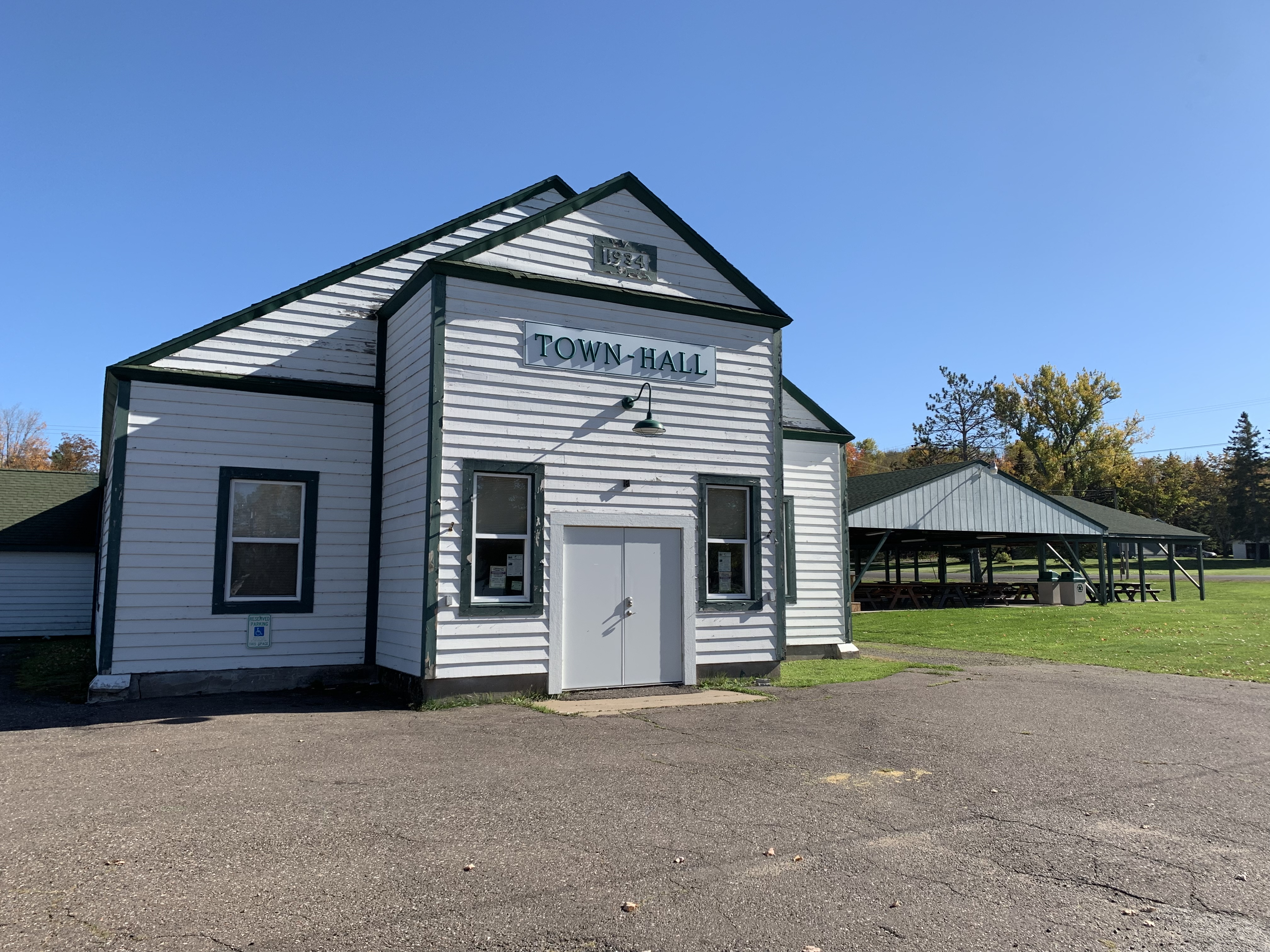
- Port Wing Town Hall

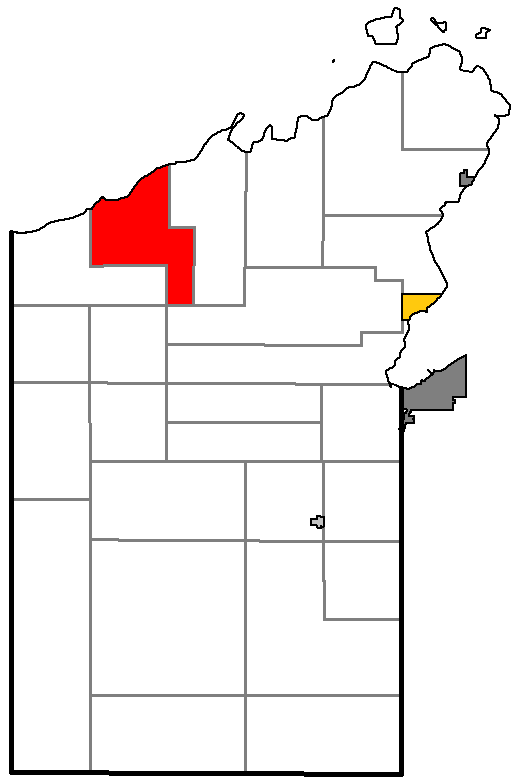
- Location of Port Wing, within Bayfield County
- Coordinates: 46°46′54″N 91°22′35″W
- Country: United States
- State: Wisconsin
- County: Bayfield

Area
  - Total: 46.8 sq mi (121.1 km^{2})
  - Land: 46.7 sq mi (120.9 km^{2})
  - Water: 0.077 sq mi (0.2 km^{2})
- Elevation: 817 ft (249 m)

Population (2020)
  - Total: 389
  - Density: 8.33/sq mi (3.22/km^{2})
- Time zone: UTC-6 (Central (CST))
  - Summer (DST): UTC-5 (CDT)
- Area codes: 715 & 534
- FIPS code: 55-64512
- GNIS feature ID: 1583962

Port Wing is a town in Bayfield County, Wisconsin, United States. The population was 389 at the 2020 census, up from 368 at the 2010 census. The unincorporated community of Port Wing is located in the town.

== Transportation ==
Wisconsin Highway 13 and Bayfield County Highway A are the main routes in the community.

== Geography ==
According to the United States Census Bureau, the town has a total area of 46.8 square miles (121.1 km^{2}), of which 46.7 square miles (120.9 km^{2}) is land and 0.077 square miles (0.2 km^{2}), or 0.17%, is water.

== Demographics ==
As of the census of 2000, there were 420 people, 194 households, and 121 families residing in the town. The population density was 9.0 people per square mile (3.5/km^{2}). There were 356 housing units at an average density of 7.6 per square mile (2.9/km^{2}). The racial makeup of the town was 97.62% White, 1.43% Native American, 0.24% Asian, and 0.71% from two or more races.

There were 194 households, out of which 22.7% had children under the age of 18 living with them, 49.0% were married couples living together, 8.2% had a female householder with no husband present, and 37.6% were non-families. 33.5% of all households were made up of individuals, and 17.0% had someone living alone who was 65 years of age or older. The average household size was 2.16 and the average family size was 2.74.

In the town, the population was spread out, with 21.4% under the age of 18, 5.7% from 18 to 24, 20.5% from 25 to 44, 33.6% from 45 to 64, and 18.8% who were 65 years of age or older. The median age was 46 years. For every 100 females, there were 107.9 males. For every 100 females age 18 and over, there were 102.5 males.

The median income for a household in the town was $30,000, and the median income for a family was $37,500. Males had a median income of $36,389 versus $26,250 for females. The per capita income for the town was $17,355. About 18.8% of families and 18.4% of the population were below the poverty line, including 23.0% of those under age 18 and 18.1% of those age 65 or over.
