= Drummond High School =

Location
- 52440 Eastern Avenue Drummond, WI; Drummond, Bayfield County, Wisconsin; United States; 46°20′8.78″N 91°15′19.6″W

Information
- Funding type: Public
- School district: Drummond Area School District
- Superintendent: Melissa Altmann
- Principal: Patrick Barnett
- Teaching staff: 9.55 (FTE)
- Grades: 9 through 12
- Enrollment: 103 (2023-2024)
- Student to teacher ratio: 10.79
- Area: 105,237 square feet
- Colors: Purple & gold
- Mascot: Lumberjacks & Lumberjills
- District size: 720 square miles
- Website: School District of Drummond

Drummond High School is a public school serving grades 9 through 12 in Drummond, Bayfield County, Wisconsin, United States. It is the only high school in the Drummond Area School District, which serves 720 square miles. The district contains the towns of Barnes, Cable, Delta, Drummond, Grand View, Kelly, Lincoln, Mason, Namakagon, Highland and the Village of Mason.

== Demographics ==
DHS is 92 percent white, three percent Native American, two percent black, two percent Hispanic, and two percent of students identify as a part of two or more races.

== Athletics ==
Athletic teams include:

- Boys Basketball
- Girls Basketball
- Cross Country
- Volleyball
- Softball
- Baseball
- Track & Field
- Powerlifting

DHS won a state championship in boys cross country in 1976.

=== Athletic conference affiliation history ===
- Bayfield County Athletic League (1936-1938)
- Indianhead Conference (1940-2023)
- Northern Lights Conference (2023–present)
