= Eastbrook Academy =

Location
- 5375 N Green Bay Ave; Milwaukee, Wisconsin; United States; 43°07′00″N 87°56′01″W

Information
- Other name: EBA
- Type: Private, Day
- Motto: United in Love, United in Christ
- Established: 1998; 28 years ago
- Head of school: Kellie Kok
- Enrollment: 363
- Average class size: 15
- Student to teacher ratio: 8:1
- Campus size: 123 acres (0.50 km^{2})
- Campus type: Suburban
- Colors: Blue, red and gold
- Athletics: 15 varsity sports
- Mascot: Warriors
- Accreditation: Independent Schools Association of the Central States (ISACS)
- Affiliation: National Association of Independent Schools (NAIS)
- Website: www.eastbrookacademy.org

Eastbrook Academy is a non-denominational private Christian school in Milwaukee, Wisconsin for grades pre-kindergarten through 12th grade that provides a classical Christian education.

Eastbrook Academy obtains almost half its funding from public money through the Milwaukee school voucher program.

== Athletics ==
Eastbrook Academy's athletic teams are nicknamed the Warriors, and they were founding members of the Lake City Conference in 2021.

=== Athletic conference affiliation history ===
- Indian Trails Conference (2010-2021)
- Lake City Conference (2021–present)
