= Sheboygan Area School District =

Public school district in Sheboygan, Wisconsin, United States

Address
- 3330 Stahl Road, Sheboygan, Wisconsin: Sheboygan, Wisconsin; Cleveland; Town of Centerville; Town of Mosel; Town of Sheboygan; Town of Wilson; United States

District information
- Type: Public
- Motto: Learning Today. Leading Tomorrow.
- Grades: PK–12
- Established: 1840
- Superintendent: Seth Harvatine
- Schools: 27
- Budget: $152,619,387 (2020-21)

Students and staff
- Students: 10,058 (2019-20)
- Staff: 1,165 (2019-20)

Other information
- Website: sheboygan.k12.wi.us

Sheboygan Area School District is a public school district in Sheboygan, Wisconsin that serves that city, the village of Cleveland, and the towns of Centerville, Mosel, Sheboygan and Wilson. It has about 1,187 teachers and other employees and about 10,232 students. Mr. Seth Harvatine is the superintendent.

The district comprises one early childhood school, 12 elementary schools, three middle schools, and two high schools. In addition, it operates several alternative programs, including Riverview Alternative Program for students at risk of dropping out, STRIVE Alternative Program (Sheboygan Transition through Reintegration and Involvement in Vocational and Education) for severely emotionally disturbed students, W.A.V.E. Alternative Program (Alternative Work, Academic and Vocational Education), Teen-Age Parent Program (TAPP) and Teenship I and II. Many of these programs are housed at the former Central High School building, which also serves as the home of the central district offices.

The high schools host their graduation ceremony in a combined fashion in the second week of June in Vollrath Park's natural bowl amphitheater, with North graduates sitting at the north end and South's graduates filling the south portion of the bowl. In the event of inclement weather, the ceremonies are held individually at the school's respective field houses.

The district's main offices moved from its Central Services facility (the former Central High School) in downtown in the fall of 2021, to an office facility south of the city which was formerly the headquarters of Wilson Mutual Insurance, facilities made redundant after a merger with Encova Insurance. The move of the district's central services will allow expansion of the programs already in the Central building.

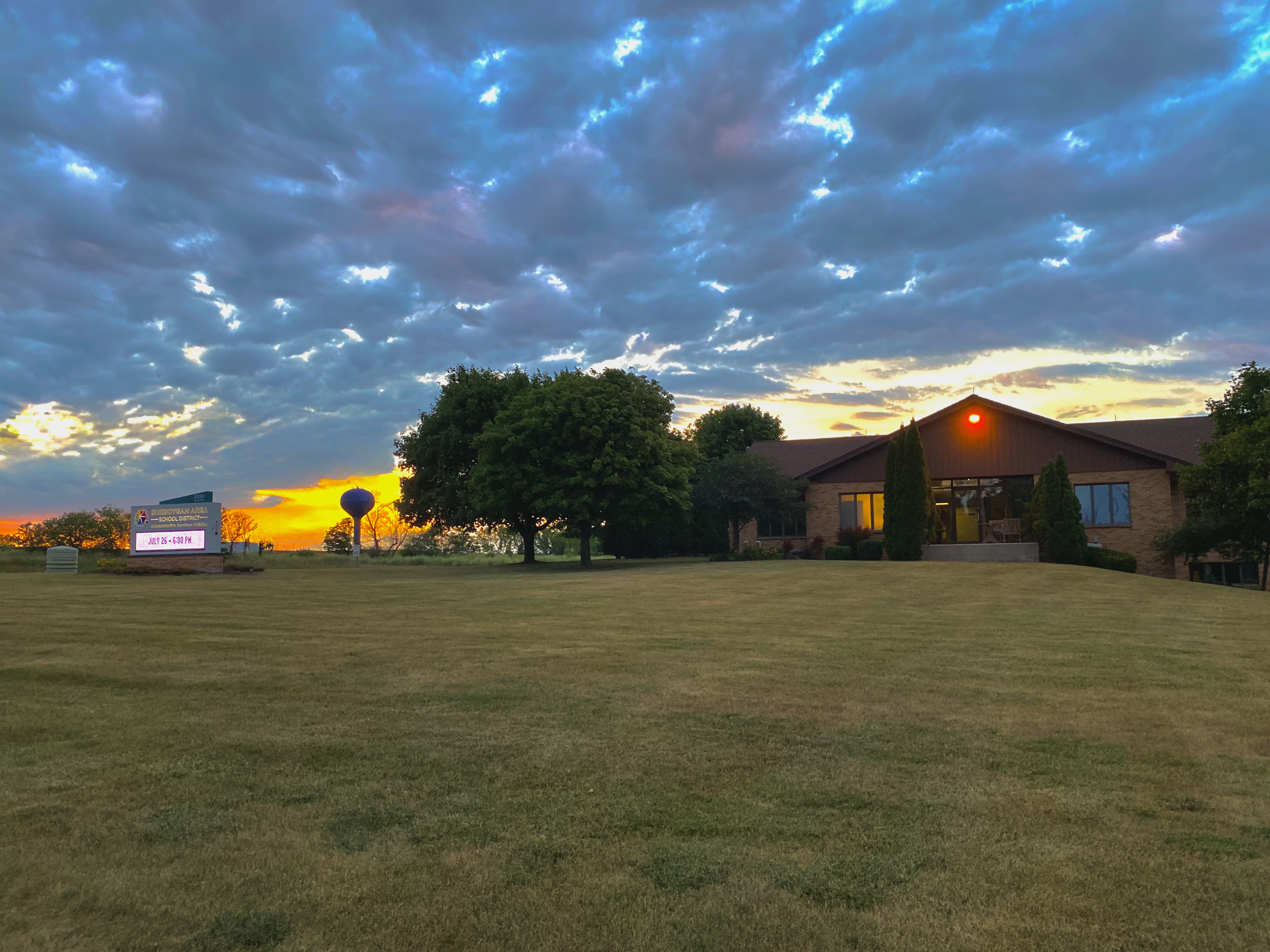
The headquarters of the Sheboygan Area School District, just outside Sheboygan city limits in the town of Wilson.

== Early childhood schools ==
- Early Learning Center

== Elementary schools ==
- Cleveland (in the village of Cleveland, serves the residents of that village and the towns of Mosel and Centerville in Manitowoc County)
- Cooper
- Grant
- Jackson
- Jefferson
- Lake Country Academy
- Longfellow
- Lincoln-Erdman
- James Madison
- Pigeon River & Étude Elementary (shared building)
- Sheboygan Leadership Academy
- Sheridan
- Wilson

== Middle schools ==
- Étude Middle School
- Farnsworth Middle School
- Lake Country Academy
- Horace Mann Middle School
- Urban Middle School
- George D. Warriner Middle School

== High schools ==
- Central High School
- Étude High School
- George D. Warriner High School
- Sheboygan North High School
- Sheboygan South High School

== Alternative programs ==
- Jailbound Instruction
- Adolescent Treatment Program (ATP)
- Homebound and Hospitalbound Instruction

== See also ==
- WSHS (FM), the high school radio for North High School
- Third Ward School, living school museum
- List of school districts in Wisconsin
