= St. Anthony High School (Milwaukee) =

St. Anthony School of Milwaukee

Location
- Milwaukee, (Milwaukee County), Wisconsin; United States; 43°0′42″N 87°55′21″W

Information
- Type: Private, Coeducational, Choice Program
- Motto: Ecce Nova Facio Omnia (Behold, I make all things new)
- Religious affiliation: Roman Catholic
- Patron saints: Christ the King and Saint Anthony of Padua
- Established: 1872
- President: Rosana Mateo
- Principal: Rose Martin
- Pastor: Fr. Fabian Rodas
- Grades: K–12
- Colors: Navy Blue and gold
- Slogan: Faith. Family. Forward.
- Team name: Roman Legion
- Communities served: South Side
- Feeder schools: St. Anthony School
- Website: www.stanthonymilwaukee.org

St. Anthony High School is a Roman Catholic private school (grades 9-12) located in Milwaukee, Wisconsin, in the Roman Catholic Archdiocese of Milwaukee. Founded in 2009, the school is part of St. Anthony School, which was founded in 1872.

== History ==
The high school began classes on August 31, 2009, with an enrollment of 107 students. It was the first new Catholic high school in the Milwaukee archdiocese in more than 25 years and the first Catholic high school on the south side within the boundaries of the city of Milwaukee since St. Mary's Academy closed in 1991. Previous leadership includes Father Cliff Ermatinger (Pastor) and Zeus Rodriguez (President 2012 - 2016).

== Curriculum ==
The curriculum at St. Anthony High School follows a Catholic, college-preparatory model focused on academic rigor and faith formation. Students study core subjects including theology, English, mathematics, sciences, social studies, and world languages, with opportunities for electives, service learning, and college readiness support to prepare them for postsecondary success.

== Athletics ==
In 2012, the boys soccer team won the Division III state championship in the second year of the program's existence.

=== Athletic conference affiliation history ===
- Indian Trails Conference (2013-2021)
- Lake City Conference (2021–present)
