= Bayfield High School (Wisconsin) =

Location
- 300 N 4th St; Bayfield, Bayfield County, Wisconsin 54814
- Coordinates: 46°48′55″N 90°49′09″W

Information
- Type: Public secondary
- Principal: Shellie Swanson
- Teaching staff: 13.87 (FTE)
- Grades: 9th through 12th
- Enrollment: 114 students (2023-2024 school year)
- Team name: Trollers
- Website: Bayfield High School

Bayfield High School is a public high school located in Bayfield, Wisconsin that serves students from 9th to 12th grade. It is part of the School District of Bayfield. The school was the subject of criticism in the early 2010s over racial discriminatory issues.

== Athletic conference affiliation history ==
- Bayfield County Athletic League (1936-1938)
- Indianhead Conference (1938-2023)
- Northern Lights Conference (2023-present)

== Notable alumni ==
- Laurie E. Carson, member of the Wisconsin State Assembly
- Beth Meyers, member of the Wisconsin State Assembly
