= Drummond, Wisconsin =

Town of Drummond, Wisconsin
- town
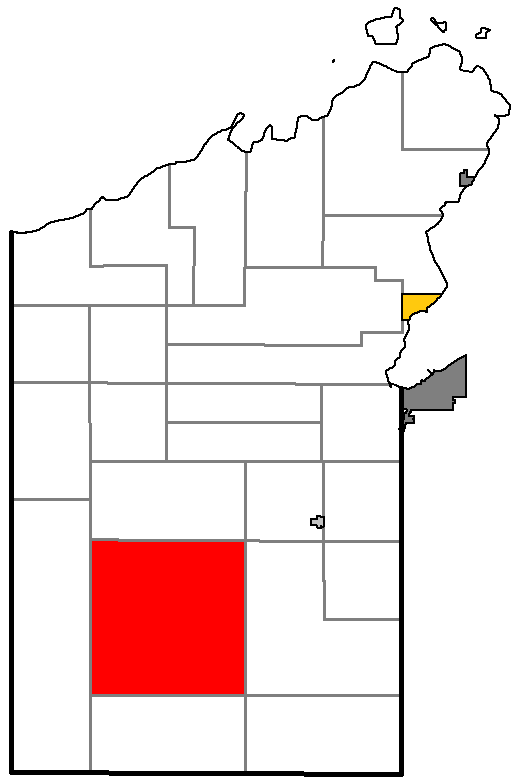
- Location of Drummond, within Bayfield County
- Coordinates: 46°19′40″N 91°16′11″W
- Country: United States
- State: Wisconsin
- County: Bayfield

Area
  - Total: 143.2 sq mi (370.8 km^{2})
  - Land: 137.3 sq mi (355.7 km^{2})
  - Water: 5.8 sq mi (15.0 km^{2})
- Elevation: 1,280 ft (390 m)

Population (2020)
  - Total: 544
  - Density: 3.96/sq mi (1.53/km^{2})
- Time zone: UTC-6 (Central (CST))
  - Summer (DST): UTC-5 (CDT)
- ZIP code: 54832
- Area codes: 715 and 534
- FIPS code: 55-20887
- GNIS feature ID: 1583102
- Website: www.drummondwi.com

Drummond is a town in Bayfield County, Wisconsin, United States. The population was 544 at the 2020 census, up from 463 at the 2010 census. The census-designated place of Drummond is located in the town. The unincorporated community of Lake Owen is also located in the town.

== Transportation ==
U.S. Highway 63 serves as a main highway in the town.

== Geography ==
According to the United States Census Bureau, the town has a total area of 143.2 square miles (370.8 km^{2}), of which 137.3 square miles (355.7 km^{2}) is land and 5.8 square miles (15.0 km^{2}), or 4.06%, is water.

=== Climate ===
Climate data for Drummond, Wisconsin, 1991–2020 normals, 1962-2020 extremes: 1340ft (408m)
Month	Jan	Feb	Mar	Apr	May	Jun	Jul	Aug	Sep	Oct	Nov	Dec	Year
Record high °F (°C)	54 (12)	61 (16)	73 (23)	90 (32)	92 (33)	98 (37)	100 (38)	96 (36)	91 (33)	86 (30)	71 (22)	59 (15)	100 (38)
Mean maximum °F (°C)	41.6 (5.3)	48.8 (9.3)	58.7 (14.8)	77.3 (25.2)	83.4 (28.6)	88.9 (31.6)	90.2 (32.3)	89.8 (32.1)	83.2 (28.4)	75.3 (24.1)	56.6 (13.7)	42.3 (5.7)	93.0 (33.9)
Mean daily maximum °F (°C)	19.1 (−7.2)	24.9 (−3.9)	36.8 (2.7)	50.2 (10.1)	63.8 (17.7)	72.9 (22.7)	76.5 (24.7)	75.3 (24.1)	67.5 (19.7)	53.3 (11.8)	36.3 (2.4)	23.9 (−4.5)	50.0 (10.0)
Daily mean °F (°C)	10.9 (−11.7)	15.2 (−9.3)	27.3 (−2.6)	39.2 (4.0)	52.2 (11.2)	61.9 (16.6)	66.2 (19.0)	65.1 (18.4)	57.8 (14.3)	44.3 (6.8)	29.9 (−1.2)	17.4 (−8.1)	40.6 (4.8)
Mean daily minimum °F (°C)	2.7 (−16.3)	5.6 (−14.7)	17.7 (−7.9)	28.3 (−2.1)	40.6 (4.8)	50.9 (10.5)	55.9 (13.3)	54.8 (12.7)	48.1 (8.9)	35.4 (1.9)	23.4 (−4.8)	10.9 (−11.7)	31.2 (−0.5)
Mean minimum °F (°C)	−24.3 (−31.3)	−18.8 (−28.2)	−10.4 (−23.6)	11.2 (−11.6)	24.8 (−4.0)	34.2 (1.2)	42.4 (5.8)	42.4 (5.8)	30.4 (−0.9)	20.2 (−6.6)	3.0 (−16.1)	−17.5 (−27.5)	−26.7 (−32.6)
Record low °F (°C)	−44 (−42)	−40 (−40)	−28 (−33)	−6 (−21)	17 (−8)	25 (−4)	29 (−2)	29 (−2)	18 (−8)	6 (−14)	−15 (−26)	−36 (−38)	−44 (−42)
Average precipitation inches (mm)	1.21 (31)	1.13 (29)	2.06 (52)	3.20 (81)	4.06 (103)	3.73 (95)	5.15 (131)	3.52 (89)	3.82 (97)	3.18 (81)	2.06 (52)	1.62 (41)	34.74 (882)
Average snowfall inches (cm)	15.50 (39.4)	12.10 (30.7)	12.50 (31.8)	6.50 (16.5)	0.10 (0.25)	0.00 (0.00)	0.00 (0.00)	0.00 (0.00)	0.00 (0.00)	1.20 (3.0)	12.90 (32.8)	13.40 (34.0)	74.2 (188.45)
Source 1: NOAA
Source 2: XMACIS2 (temp records & 1981-2010 monthly max/mins)

== Demographics ==
As of the census of 2000, there were 541 people, 231 households, and 155 families residing in the town. The population density was 3.9 people per square mile (1.5/km^{2}). There were 645 housing units at an average density of 4.7 per square mile (1.8/km^{2}). The racial makeup of the town was 98.34% White, 0.92% Native American, and 0.74% from two or more races. Hispanic or Latino of any race were 1.11% of the population.

There were 231 households, out of which 26.0% had children under the age of 18 living with them, 59.3% were married couples living together, 4.3% had a female householder with no husband present, and 32.5% were non-families. 28.6% of all households were made up of individuals, and 18.6% had someone living alone who was 65 years of age or older. The average household size was 2.34 and the average family size was 2.83.

In the town, the population was spread out, with 23.1% under the age of 18, 4.6% from 18 to 24, 24.0% from 25 to 44, 26.4% from 45 to 64, and 21.8% who were 65 years of age or older. The median age was 44 years. For every 100 females, there were 92.5 males. For every 100 females age 18 and over, there were 98.1 males.

The median income for a household in the town was $37,500, and the median income for a family was $41,544. Males had a median income of $31,827 versus $16,875 for females. The per capita income for the town was $16,773. About 8.3% of families and 12.4% of the population were below the poverty line, including 12.0% of those under age 18 and 18.2% of those age 65 or over.

== Education ==
- Drummond High School is the town's high school.
