= Cristo Rey Jesuit High School Milwaukee =

Coordinates: 43°1′7.6″N 87°58′14.21″W

Location
- 1818 West National Ave. Milwaukee, Wisconsin 53204; United States

Information
- Type: Jesuit, Catholic, college prep
- Denomination: All faiths
- President: Andy Stith
- Principal: Patrick Bader
- Grades: 9 – 12
- Gender: Coeducational
- Enrollment: ~470/year
- Colors: Blue & Gold
- Mascot: "Benny" the Bison
- Nickname: Trailblazers
- Affiliation: Cristo Rey Network
- Website: cristoreymilwaukee

Cristo Rey Jesuit High School Milwaukee is a coeducational, Catholic, college preparatory school and a member of the Cristo Rey Network that follows the work-study model of education.

== History ==
The school was originally established at 45th and Scott Streets in West Milwaukee, in the former St. Florian Parish School building. It is under the direction of the Society of Jesus in the Catholic church and is open to students of all faiths. It serves students from families of limited means.

In November 2017 the school indicated it would be moving to a much larger and more conveniently located facility at 1818 W. National Ave.
