= Washburn High School (Wisconsin) =

Location
- 305 W 4th Street; Washburn, Bayfield County, Wisconsin 54891; United States
- Coordinates: 46°40′26″N 90°53′52″W

Information
- Type: Public secondary
- Oversight: School District of Washburn
- NCES School ID: 551554001985
- Principal: Angela Berndt
- Teaching staff: 14.41 (on an FTE basis)
- Grades: 9–12
- Enrollment: 189 (2023–24)
- Student to teacher ratio: 13.12
- Colors: Red and black
- Team name: Castle Guards
- Website: Washburn High School

Washburn High School is a public high school located in Washburn, Wisconsin that serves students from 9th through 12th grade. It is part of the School District of Washburn.

== Athletic conference affiliation history ==
- Bayfield County Athletic League (1936-1938)
- Indianhead Conference (1938-2023)
- Northern Lights Conference (2023-present)

== Notable alumni ==
- Tom Blake, surfer (did not graduate due to the 1918 spanish flu outbreak)
