= South Shore School District =

School district in Wisconsin, United States

- Port Wing, Wisconsin

District information
- Type: Public
- Established: 1894
- Superintendent: Danielle Mikula

Students and staff
- District mascot: Big Red
- Colors: Red & White

Other information
- Nickname: Cardinals
- School Song: Minnesota Rouser
- Website: South Shore School District Website

South Shore School District is located in Port Wing, Wisconsin and serves students in grades Pre-K through 12. It is located on School Road and Washington Avenue. The name South Shore was suggested in 1942 by Alice Okkonen, an elementary school teacher from Herbster, Wisconsin.

== History ==
South Shore School District was originally one of the many “township schools” in Bayfield County, Wisconsin, when Port Wing Township was still part of Bayfield Township. Over the years five schools have been built - in 1893, 1894, 1898, 1903, 1978 and 1990.

The first “schoolhouse” was built in 1893 by Irving Herrick as a small log structure near Larson Creek and Twin Falls. There were about seven students.

The second school was built in 1894 by the Town of Bayfield and was a one-room school with a belfry.

Because of growing enrollment in the town of Port Wing, the Town of Bayfield constructed a second schoolhouse in 1898, along with a woodshed. It was later made into the Port Wing Creamery and then enlarged to make a co-op. When there were more students than the schools could handle, the Presbyterian Church was used.

These two schools served as the main sites for education in Port Wing until 1903, when they were replaced by the “Big White School”. On March 8, 1901, Port Wing became a town, putting it in charge of schools. Because of the growing enrollment, the Town of Port Wing built a larger three-story white school in 1903 costing $25,000. The building was divided into the Port Wing Graded School on the first floor, and the Union Free High School on the second floor. The school board of 1903 was also "high-tech”, operating the first school busses (wagons called kid hacks) in Wisconsin.

This was the Port Wing school until 1978, when a new school was constructed. In 1979, everything from the "Big White School" was destroyed except the belfry, which stands today as a reminder of the school. In 1990 the elementary addition was added on the south side.

== Extra-curricular activities ==
South Shore has a monthly newspaper, the Pocoho. It was named after the towns in the district. Some other extra-curricular the school has are Quiz Bowl, high school Forensics, and drama.

=== Athletics ===
There are fewer sports than at most schools, but they include baseball, cross country, football (readded in 2021-2022), volleyball, and basketball. The school's basketball program has teams for 3-4 and 5-6 grades, middle school, and high school. The boys' team went 20-0 in conference play in the 2007-08 school year. The Cardinals had the best defense that year with an opponent average of 38.2 points a game, along with the 2nd best offense averaging 62.7 points per game.

South Shore has two gymnasiums and a track and field area on campus, along with two smaller outdoor courts and a playground.

== Notable alumni ==
- Jolene Anderson, former WNBA player, Big Ten Conference Women's Basketball Player of the Year in 2007-08 and the all-time leading scorer for the Wisconsin Badgers women's basketball team.
- Megan DiLeo - WNBA player, Iowa Hawkeyes women's basketball 2nd all-time leading scorer, 2019 Naismith Award winner and two-time Big Ten Conference Women's Basketball Player of the Year
