= Minong, Wisconsin =

- Village
- Location of Minong in Washburn County, Wisconsin.
- Coordinates: 46°6′59″N 91°55′5″W
- Country: United States
- State: Wisconsin
- County: Washburn

Area
  - Total: 1.54 sq mi (3.98 km^{2})
  - Land: 1.53 sq mi (3.95 km^{2})
  - Water: 0.012 sq mi (0.03 km^{2})
- Elevation: 1,056 ft (322 m)

Population (2020)
  - Total: 548
  - Density: 359/sq mi (138.7/km^{2})
- Area codes: 715 & 534
- FIPS code: 55-53250
- GNIS feature ID: 1569582
- Website: www.villageofminong.org

Minong (/ˈmaɪnɒŋ/ MY-nong) is a village in Washburn County, Wisconsin, United States. The population was 548 at the 2020 census. The village is located within the Town of Minong.

== History ==
Minong is a name derived from the Ojibwe language. It is generally translated as "blueberry place" or "good place". Minong is also the Ojibwe name for Isle Royale.

A post office called Minong has been in operation since 1887. The village was laid out in 1888 when the Chicago, St. Paul, Minneapolis and Omaha Railway constructed a rail line through the area. Josiah Bond and J. J. Hohl and were the principal developers of the village.

The snack brand Jack Link's originated in Minong in 1986.

== Transportation ==
U.S. Highway 53 and Wisconsin Highway 77 are two of the main routes in the community.

== Geography ==
Minong is located at 46°5′58″N 91°49′33″W (46.099562, -91.825902).

According to the United States Census Bureau, the village has a total area of 1.53 square miles (3.96 km^{2}), of which 1.52 square miles (3.94 km^{2}) is land and 0.01 square miles (0.03 km^{2}) is water.

== Demographics ==
Historical population
| Census | Pop. | Note | %± |
|---|---|---|---|
| 1920 | 230 | | — |
| 1930 | 292 | | 27.0% |
| 1940 | 308 | | 5.5% |
| 1950 | 357 | | 15.9% |
| 1960 | 348 | | −2.5% |
| 1970 | 420 | | 20.7% |
| 1980 | 557 | | 32.6% |
| 1990 | 521 | | −6.5% |
| 2000 | 531 | | 1.9% |
| 2010 | 527 | | −0.8% |
| 2020 | 548 | | 4.0% |
U.S. Decennial Census

=== 2010 census ===
As of the census of 2010, there were 527 people, 238 households, and 129 families living in the village. The population density was 353.7 inhabitants per square mile (136.6/km^{2}). There were 277 housing units at an average density of 185.9 per square mile (71.8/km^{2}). The racial makeup of the village was 93.0% White, 0.4% African American, 0.4% Native American, 0.2% Asian, 4.6% from other races, and 1.5% from two or more races. Hispanic or Latino of any race were 6.1% of the population.

There were 238 households, of which 30.3% had children under the age of 18 living with them, 37.4% were married couples living together, 10.1% had a female householder with no husband present, 6.7% had a male householder with no wife present, and 45.8% were non-families. 37.8% of all households were made up of individuals, and 21.8% had someone living alone who was 65 years of age or older. The average household size was 2.21 and the average family size was 2.96.

The median age in the village was 41.3 years. 25.2% of residents were under the age of 18; 6.2% were between the ages of 18 and 24; 24.4% were from 25 to 44; 22.5% were from 45 to 64; and 21.8% were 65 years of age or older. The gender makeup of the village was 52.0% male and 48.0% female.

=== 2000 census ===
As of the census of 2000, there were 531 people, 230 households, and 137 families living in the village. The population density was 349.6 people per square mile (134.9/km^{2}). There were 247 housing units at an average density of 162.6 per square mile (62.7/km^{2}). The racial makeup of the village was 97.18% White, 1.32% Native American, 0.38% Asian, and 1.13% from two or more races. 0.75% of the population were Hispanic or Latino of any race.

There were 230 households, out of which 29.1% had children under the age of 18 living with them, 44.8% were married couples living together, 8.3% had a female householder with no husband present, and 40.4% were non-families. 36.5% of all households were made up of individuals, and 19.6% had someone living alone who was 65 years of age or older. The average household size was 2.31 and the average family size was 3.04.

In the village, the population was spread out, with 26.2% under the age of 18, 7.3% from 18 to 24, 26.2% from 25 to 44, 21.7% from 45 to 64, and 18.6% who were 65 years of age or older. The median age was 38 years. For every 100 females, there were 95.9 males. For every 100 females age 18 and over, there were 92.2 males.

The median income for a household in the village was $25,341, and the median income for a family was $35,341. Males had a median income of $27,411 versus $14,844 for females. The per capita income for the village was $13,306. About 15.2% of families and 23.2% of the population were below the poverty line, including 38.2% of those under age 18 and 11.2% of those age 65 or over.
