= Port Wing, Wisconsin =

Census-designated place in Wisconsin, United States

- Census-designated place
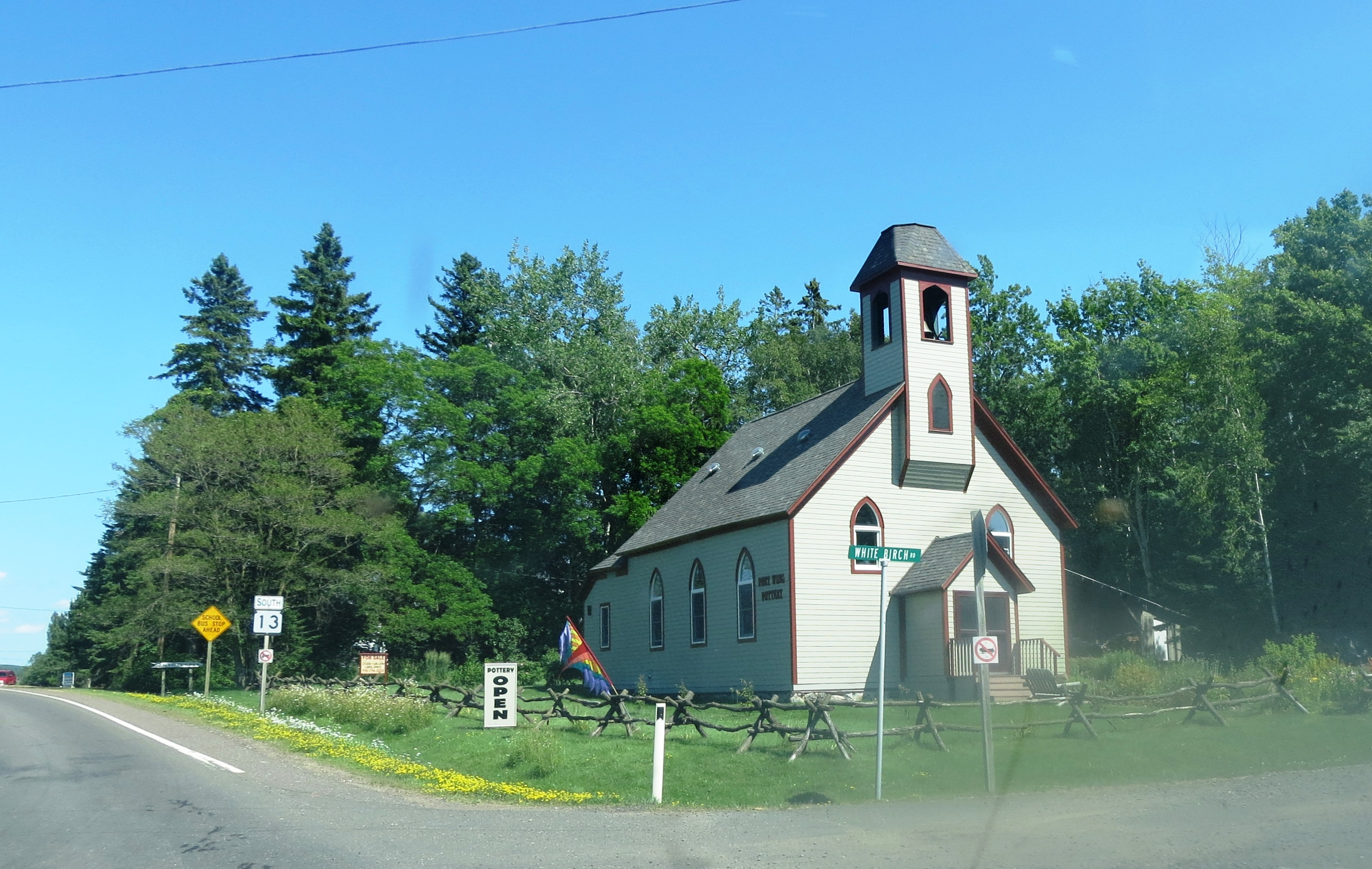

- Location within Wisconsin
- Coordinates: 46°46′29″N 91°23′12″W
- Country: United States
- State: Wisconsin
- County: Bayfield
- Town: Port Wing

Area
  - Total: 1.150 sq mi (2.98 km^{2})
  - Land: 1.150 sq mi (2.98 km^{2})
  - Water: 0 sq mi (0 km^{2})
- Elevation: 676 ft (206 m)

Population (2020)
  - Total: 156
  - Density: 136/sq mi (52.4/km^{2})
- Time zone: UTC-6 (Central (CST))
  - Summer (DST): UTC-5 (CDT)
- ZIP code: 54865
- Area codes: 715 and 534
- GNIS feature ID: 1571798

Port Wing (also Portwing) is an unincorporated census-designated place in the town of Port Wing, Bayfield County, Wisconsin, United States. As of the 2020 census, Port Wing had a population of 156. The community is situated along Wisconsin Highway 13 and Bayfield County Highway A and is 30 miles (48 km) west of Bayfield. The Flag River enters Lake Superior at Port Wing's harbor.

== Population and area ==
As of the 2020 census, Port Wing's population was 156, which was a decrease from the figure of 164 tabulated in 2010. Port Wing has an area of 1.150 square miles (2.98 km^{2}), all land.

== Education ==
Port Wing is the site of South Shore School District.

== Notable people ==
- Jolene Anderson, former WNBA player, Big Ten Conference Women's Basketball Player of the Year in 2007-08 and the all-time leading scorer for the University of Wisconsin women's basketball team, grew up in Port Wing.
- Megan DiLeo, 2019 Naismith Award winner and two-time Big Ten Conference Women's Basketball Player of the Year at the University of Iowa, was raised from infancy in Port Wing (though born in a Duluth, Minnesota hospital).
- Gary Sherman, politician and jurist, lived in Port Wing.
