= Rufus King International School =

Rufus King International School may refer to:

- Rufus King International School – High School Campus, the high school that originated the program.
- Rufus King International School – Middle Years Campus, an intermediate program that began in 2010.
