= Ronald Myers =

Ronald V. Myers
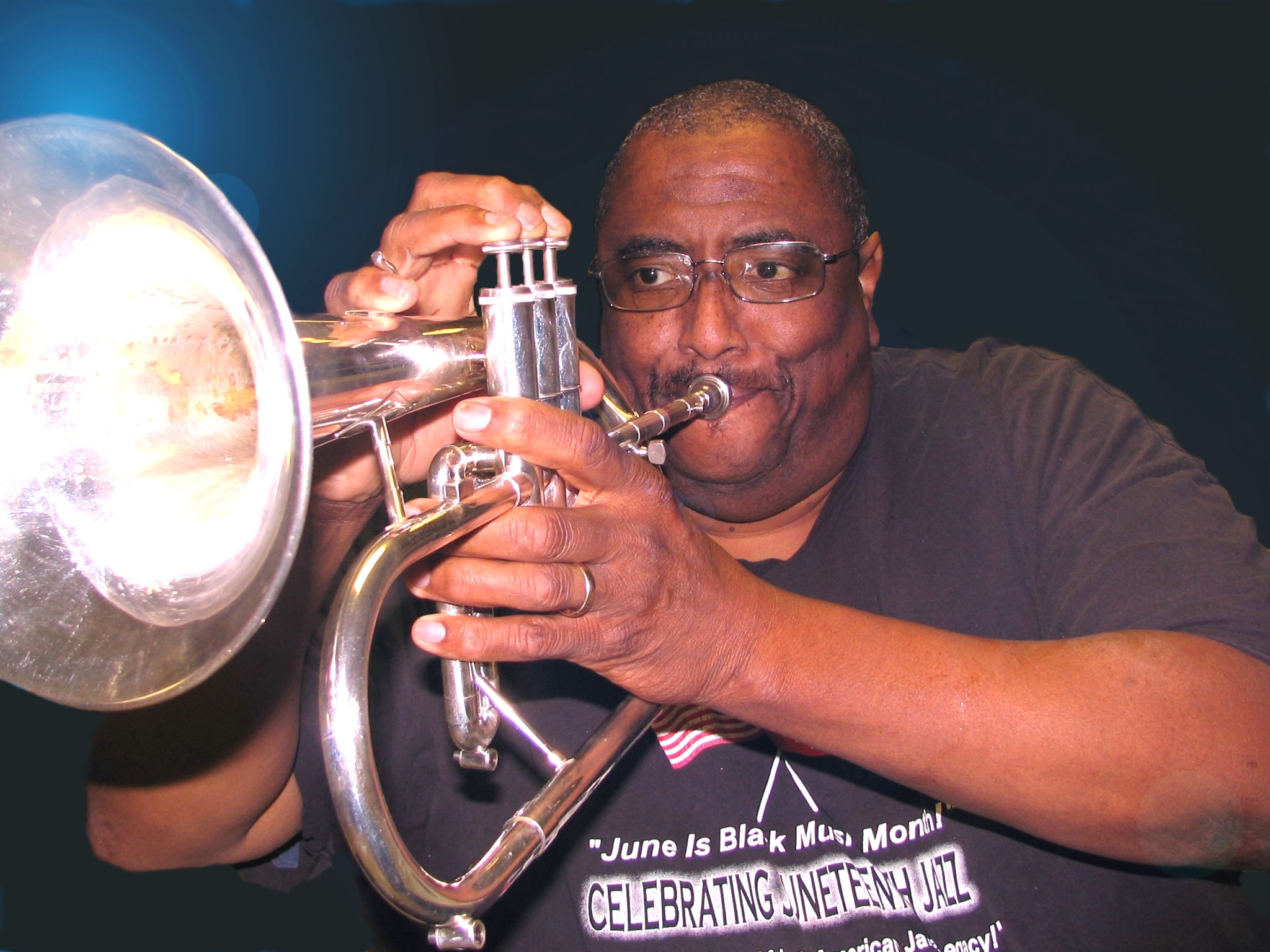
- Myers at a 2013 performance

Background information
- Born: February 29, 1956.
- Origin: Chicago, Illinois, US
- Died: September 7, 2018 (aged 62)
- Genres: improvisational jazz praise & worship, hard bop, post-bop, progressive jazz, Soul-jazz, Jazz-funk
- Occupations: Physician, christian minister, musician
- Instruments: Trumpet, piano
- Years active: 1974–2017
- Label: Moja Records

Ronald V. Myers, Sr. (born February 29, 1956 – September 7, 2018) was an American physician, Baptist minister, musician, and civil rights activist. He was the founder and chairman of several organizations active in the modern movement to promote the holiday Juneteenth. He worked in the field of medicine, providing care to poor rural residents of the American South. He also performed as a jazz musician.

== Personal life and education ==
Myers was born in Chicago, Illinois, the youngest of two sons, to Marion Mack Myers and Neoma R. Myers. The Myers family moved to Milwaukee, Wisconsin when his parents became employed as teachers in the Milwaukee Public Schools. He attended Rufus King High School in Milwaukee. He was a soloist in the high school jazz ensemble on trumpet and piano.

Myers attended the University of Wisconsin–Madison, where he majored in African American Studies and was a member of the Experimental Improvisational Black Music Ensemble, under the mentorship of trombonist and professor Jimmy Cheatham. He graduated from the University of Wisconsin Medical School in 1985 and completed his residency in Family Medicine at LSU Medical Center's Washington St. Tammany Parish Charity Hospital in Bogalusa, Louisiana in 1988. He took part-time courses at Reformed Theological Seminary at Mississippi Valley State University in 1989 and 1990.

== Career ==
In 1988 he and his wife opened a family health center in Tchula, Mississippi, located in an area with scarce medical resources and a high infant mortality rate. In 1990 he was ordained by Pilgrim Rest Missionary Baptist Church in Milwaukee, and commissioned by the Wisconsin Baptist Pastors Conference as a medical missionary to the Mississippi Delta.

Myers worked to bring attention to the working conditions of African-American catfish workers in the Mississippi Delta, and from 1996 to 2005 organized the annual Buffalo Fish Festival in Belzoni, Mississippi at the same time as the Catfish industry sponsored the World Catfish Festival.

In 1994 a group of community leaders from across the country gathered at Christian Unity Baptist Church in New Orleans, to work for greater national recognition of Juneteenth, a holiday celebrating the end of slavery. Myers was elected Chairman of this advocacy effort, and continues to serve as chairman of the National Juneteenth Holiday Campaign, National Juneteenth Christian Leadership Council, National Juneteenth Observance Foundation, and the National Association of Juneteenth Jazz Presenters.

In 2003, Myers organized a coalition of chronic pain patients, physicians, and patient-rights advocates, to encourage passage of the Arkansas Chronic Pain Treatment Act, through a series public marches and protest rallies in the state capitol of Little Rock. In 2004 and 2005, Myers organized marches demanding Congressional hearings on the subject.

In 2006, Myers bought the team Mississippi Stingers of the American Basketball Association. Renamed the Mississippi Miracles, the team played for one season before shutting down.

== Death ==
Myers died on September 7, 2018.

== Recordings ==
- Doctor's Orders (1994 ) – MOJA Records)
- Juneteenth "Free at Last" (2006) – MOJA Records)
