= Advanced Language & Academic Studies High School =

High school in Wisconsin, United States

Coordinates: 43.008061°N 87.923599°W

Advanced Language & Academic Studies High School (ALAS) is part of the Milwaukee Public Schools district in Milwaukee, Wisconsin. For the 2009–2010 school year, total enrollment was 249 students. As of 2016 it had 247 students with a Student Radial Diversity Index of 13%. Most students speak the Spanish language as their first language (although lessons are taught in both the Spanish language and the English language).
