= Excel High School =

Excel High School may refer to:

- Excel High School (Alabama), a public high school in the town of Excel, Alabama
- EXCEL High School, a former public high school in Oakland, California
- Milwaukee Excel High School, a former high school in Milwaukee, Wisconsin
- Excel High School (Massachusetts), a public high school in Boston, Massachusetts
