= WYMS =

Adult album alternative public radio station in Milwaukee

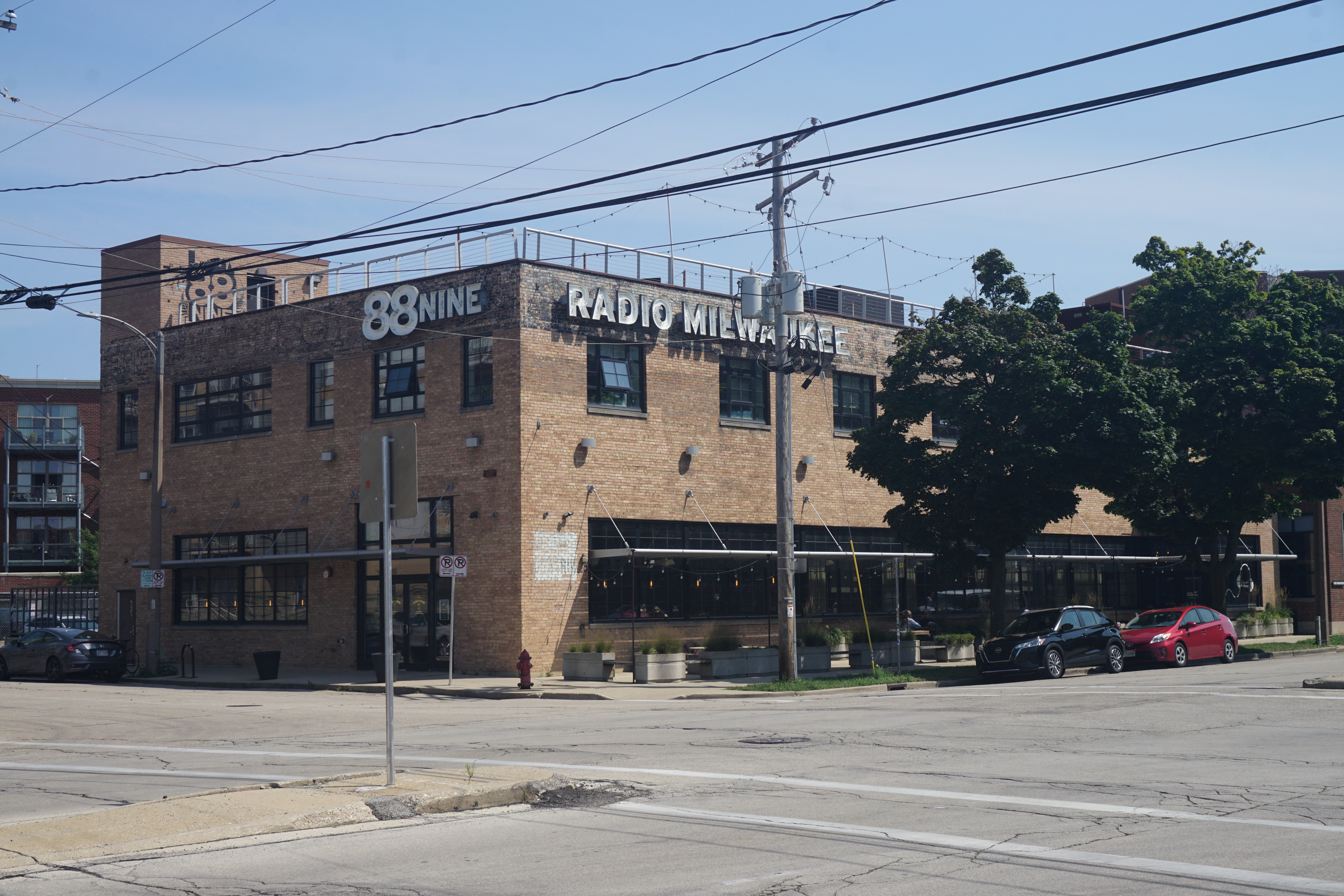
- Radio Milwaukee building
- Milwaukee, Wisconsin; United States
- Frequency: 88.9 MHz (HD Radio)
- Branding: 88Nine Radio Milwaukee

Programming
- Format: Adult album alternative
- Subchannels: HD2: Urban alternative "HYFIN" HD3: Adult Album Alternative “414 Music FM”
- Affiliations: NPR; PRX

Ownership
- Owner: Milwaukee Public Schools; (Milwaukee Board of School Directors)
- Operator: Radio Milwaukee

History
- First air date: March 5, 1973
- Call sign meaning: We're Your Milwaukee Schools

Technical information
- Licensing authority: FCC
- Facility ID: 42669
- Class: B1
- ERP: 1,450 watts
- HAAT: 289 meters (948 ft)
- Transmitter coordinates: 43.091°N 87.897°W

Links
- Public license information: Public file; LMS
- Webcast: Listen live; HD2: Listen live
- Website: www.radiomilwaukee.org; HD2: radiomilwaukee.org/414music-fm/

WYMS (88.9 FM) is a non-commercial radio station in Milwaukee, Wisconsin. The station currently airs an eclectic adult album alternative music format, branded as "88Nine Radio Milwaukee". The station's license is owned by Milwaukee Public Schools, though it is managed and programmed by an outside group, also named Radio Milwaukee. In addition, WYMS airs weekly school board meetings on the over-the-air signal as a condition of MPS leasing the signal to Radio Milwaukee. The station broadcast in the HD Radio (digital hybrid) format, with its second subchannel carrying a locally-based automated AAA format.

WYMS transmits from the WITI TV Tower in Shorewood and has their studios inside the Radio Milwaukee Walker's Point Studios within the J.C. Busch Co. Building on 220 East Pittsburgh Avenue in the Walker's Point area, with backup facilities maintained at the former main studios in the MPS administration building (also known as the Central Services or Central Office building) on West Vliet Street in the Washington Park neighborhood. The Vliet studios continue to be maintained for school board meetings and for FCC correspondence, which remains under the purview of MPS. The public radio station announced its purchase of the new studio facility in March 2013. It includes four recording studios, among other amenities. The move was completed in August 2013, with the station's first music awards ceremony held in the winter of 2013.

== History ==
Initially, WYMS ran mainstream jazz as "Jazz 89" with various ethnic programming (particularly Polka music) on the weekends, along with the standard high school radio programming and training intended by the operation of a school district radio station.

In the spring of 2002, Milwaukee Public Schools had a budget shortfall and the station's operations were handed over to WUWM at the University of Wisconsin–Milwaukee. For a short period, WYMS simulcasted WUWM's programming before switching over to syndicated mainstream jazz music after listener criticism of the duplicative programming. MPS soon offered the rights to an interest non-profit to take over WYMS's operations, with Radio Milwaukee eventually being approved by the MPS board to operate and program the station.

Under management of Radio Milwaukee, the station planned to introduce an eclectic contemporary music format. After many delays and target sign-on dates, the station dropped the automated jazz programming and began stunting on February 23, 2007. The new format officially debuted on February 26, with on-air personalities first appearing on March 5.

In May 2010, the station picked up World Cafe from WUWM after that station considered the program's music direction out of format.

In May 2016, 88Nine Radio Milwaukee welcomed Glenn Kleiman as executive director. January 2019 saw WYMS officially join NPR as a member station.

On August 11, 2022, WYMS partnered with Super Hi Fi to launch an online radio station called "Rhythm Lab Radio".

In July 2025, longtime WLUM-FM morning host Jonathan Adler joined WYMS as assistant program director and nighttime host.
