= Rufus King International High School =

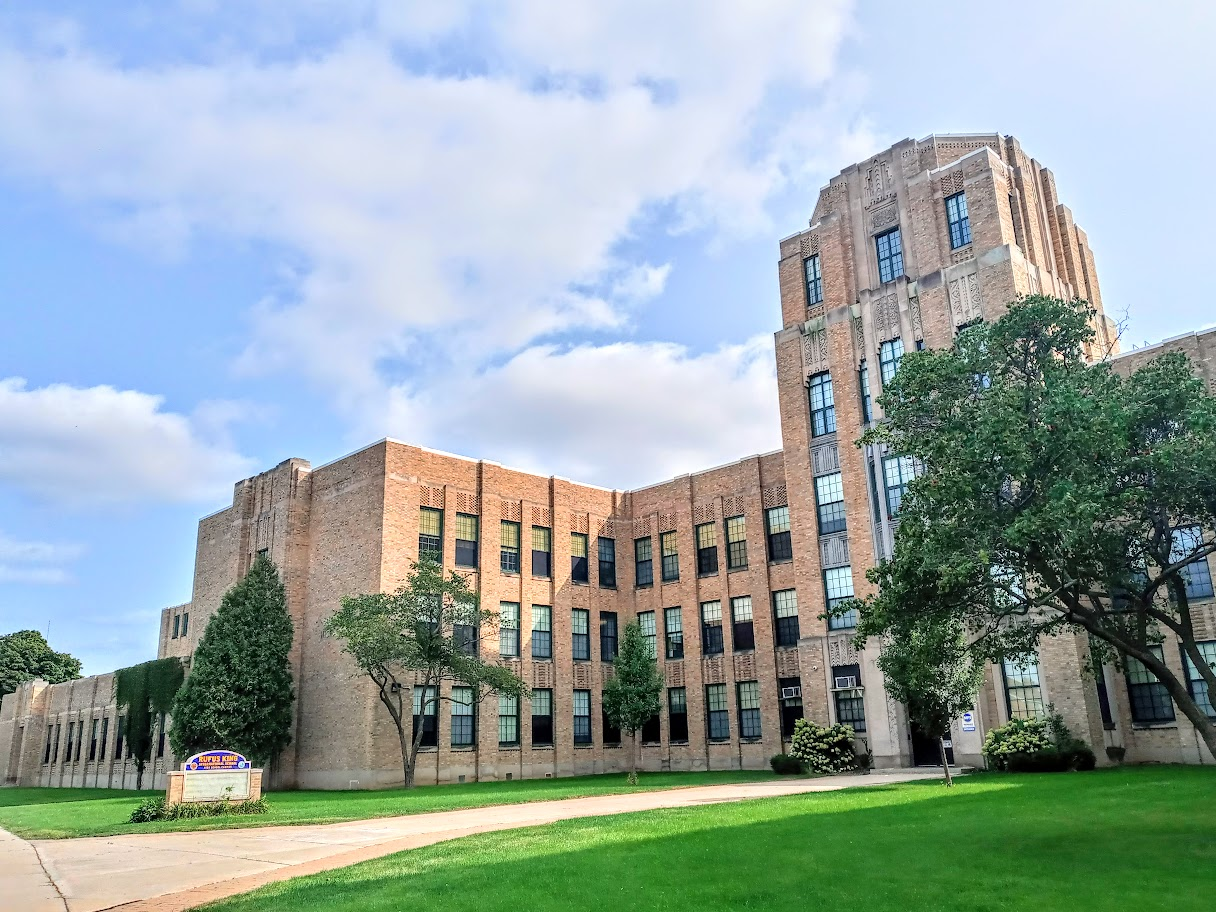
- Rufus King as seen from Olive Street.

Location
- 1801 W. Olive Street; Milwaukee, Wisconsin 53209-6898; United States; 43°05′36.5″N 87°55′59.1″W

Information
- School type: Public secondary (magnet)
- Motto: "Know the true value of time; snatch, seize, and enjoy every moment of it; no idleness, no laziness, no procrastination; never put off until tomorrow what you can do today."
- Established: 1934 (IB introduced 1979)
- School district: Milwaukee Public Schools
- Superintendent: Eduardo Galavan (acting superintendent)
- CEEB code: 501435
- Principal: Doreen Badillo
- Teaching staff: 70.80 (FTE)
- Grades: 9–12
- Enrollment: 1,339 (2023–2024)
- Student to teacher ratio: 18.91
- Campus: Urban Area
- Colour: Royal Blue/Gold
- Athletics conference: City Conference
- Mascot: The Rufus King General
- Nickname: The Generals
- Publication: The Sphinx, literary magazine
- Yearbook: The King's Crown
- Website: https://mps.school/rufusking/

Rufus King International High School, or Rufus King, is a public magnet high school located on the north side of Milwaukee, Wisconsin, part of the Milwaukee Public Schools district. The school is ranked the 1,658th best public high school in the country by U.S. News & World Report, making it the 42nd best performing public high school in the state of Wisconsin. The school offers the International Baccalaureate curriculum.

The school was formerly named Rufus King International Baccalaureate High School. After the addition of a feeder middle years program in the 2010–2011 school year, the high school was renamed Rufus King International School – High School Campus.

Fifty-five percent of the students are of African American descent (compared to the state average of 9.4%), fifteen percent of students are Caucasian, fifteen percent of students are Hispanic, and eleven percent are Asian. Seventy-five percent of students are eligible for free school lunch.

== Academics ==
Rufus King's college preparatory curriculum is anchored by the International Baccalaureate Diploma Program (IBDP), which was established at the school in 1979, the first such school in the state of Wisconsin and one of the first in North America. The emphasis in the curriculum is on writing, speaking, critical thinking and independent application of knowledge. Full Diploma students are also required to write a 3,000-4,000 word original essay and volunteer at least 150 hours of service. All Rufus King students participate in pre-diploma and IB courses and more than half of the student population take at least one IB test with a success rate of 85.9% passing. 95% of graduates matriculate to higher education.

All students at Rufus King are required to complete four years of English, three years of Mathematics, Natural Science and Social Science, as well as two years of the same World Language. The languages offered at King are Spanish, German, and French. Among the school's academic electives are sociology, psychology, geography, and economics.

=== Academic achievements ===
Rufus King is considered the top high school in the state of Wisconsin based on U.S. News & World Report rankings that demonstrated high participation rates on International Baccalaureate exams and college readiness index ratings. In 2012, the school was ranked the 130th best high school in the nation by the magazine, putting it in the top one percent of public high schools in the country. Rufus King received the "Gold" ranking from the magazine.

The school was ranked the top public high school in Wisconsin by Newsweek Magazine in 2003, 2005, 2006, 2007, 2008, 2009, and 2010. In 2010, Rufus King was ranked the 324th top high school in the country in Newsweek's rating, though the school has not made the list since Newsweek modified its ranking method, causing some local controversy.

The school has twice been designated a National Blue Ribbon School of Excellence (1982–1983, 1994–1996), and has been named a New Wisconsin Promise School of Excellence for the fifth year in a row, one of 15 schools in the State of Wisconsin achieving the title.

On May 8, 2002, the school was visited by President George W. Bush, who delivered an educational policy address in which he recognized Rufus King as one of the top high schools in the country.

In 2003–2004, King was selected as one of ten schools nationwide to participate in an ACT study, "On Course for Success", on how schools prepare students for college coursework. According to ACT, Rufus King was selected because of its diverse student body and its students' strong ACT scores in math and science.

In November 2009, Eva Lam, a Rufus King and Harvard University graduate, received a Rhodes Scholarship, becoming the first within the school district. She credits her award to the education she received through Milwaukee Public Schools.

On April 4, 2011, Rev. Jesse Jackson Sr. visited the school to encourage juniors and seniors to participate in the April 5th municipal and statewide elections. He also confronted stereotypes about urban youth and encouraged student empowerment.

On March 30, 2012, Milwaukee Mayor Tom Barrett and County Executive Chris Abele declared March 30 "Rufus King Day" both on the city and county level. The proclamation was given because of great success by the school's academic and sports programs.

On May 15, 2012, the school was ranked the 130th best public high school in the nation by U.S. News & World Report, making it the highest ranked school in the State.

On May 25, 2012, Milwaukee Public Schools announced that two Rufus King High School students, Zhenrui Liao and Ahmee Marshall-Christensen, scored perfect scores on their ACT tests.

On May 22, 2013, it was announced that Rufus King was selected as the winner of the ACT national College and Career Transition Award, which honors a high school that displays "exemplary college and career readiness efforts." Rufus King was the only school in the nation to receive the award. The school received the award specifically in recognition of a nonprofit ACT preparation course started by student Zhenrui Liao. It was nominated for the award by Wisconsin Governor Scott Walker and Wisconsin Superintendent of Public Instruction Tony Evers.

On May 8, 2014, the Washington Post ranked Rufus King as one of the most challenging high schools in the country, making it in the top 50 schools in the Midwest and the third-highest in the state.

=== Middle school ===
The middle school, which began its first school year in 2010, is part of the 6–12 program of Rufus King High School. The program incorporates the International Baccalaureate Middle Years Programme (MYP). The MYP IB Middle Years programme that is applied to every Rufus King student regardless of previous middle school which may not have IB Middle Years programme, transitioning to Rufus King High School, regardless of MYP status in any middle school, all Rufus King scholars are required to be in a MYP course from grades 6–10.

== Extracurricular activities ==
The Rufus King General, mascot

Rufus King High School has over 55 extracurricular activities for students to participate in, including several activities not available in other schools in the region.

Honorary Societies: King has a chapter of the National Honor Society, recognizing students for strong values of scholarship, leadership, service, and character. There are also other academic honorary programs including the Spanish Honor Society, Science National Honor Society, and the National English Honor Society. All of these honor societies participate in community service projects around the city.

Forensics and Debate: Rufus King has policy debate and a forensics team. The school participates in the national districts of the National Forensics League (NFL), regional Wisconsin Forensic Coaches Association, and Wisconsin Debate Coaches Association, as well as the citywide Milwaukee Debate League. Nearly every year, King debaters qualify for both NFL and NCFL national tournaments, while placing high at state, regional, and local tournaments. Students from the school have won two NFL national championships in Student Congress (as well as the Presiding Officer Award), the NFL national championship in Policy Debate, the NFL national championship in Extemporaneous Commentary, the Harvard College National Congress championship, the NFL School of Excellence in Debate award, and had two consecutive sweeps of the Wisconsin State Congress. In both 2012 and 2013, the team reached semi-finals at the State Debate Tournament, the latter year taking third and fifth place Best Speakers. In 2013, Rufus King became the first team in the state to sweep all of the Southern Qualifier NFL and NCFL spots, which had previously been split with other schools.

Chess: The chess team participates in the Milwaukee Metro Chess League and participates city and state chess meets. In 2001, the team competed at the United States Chess Nationals in Kentucky.

Mathematics: The "Mathletes" competition team has won at local, state and national levels. Rufus King also has an Accounting Club that provides a link between students and business organizations in the Milwaukee area.

Science: Rufus King has entered a 15-member team in the Wisconsin Science Olympiad since its beginning in 1985. Rufus King won "valued participant" at the Wisconsin Science Olympiad in 1994, advancing to the regional competition, where it placed 13th in nation. The National Science Bowl team finished fourth in the nation in 1994. Rufus King regularly enters a variety of local and national science and engineering competitions. The Chemistry Olympiad Team competes annually and has sent five students to the State Finals: Zhenrui Liao, Paul Meyers, Madison Cox, Tony Stano and Andre Quarino.

Music: The school has a marching band, concert band, orchestra, jazz ensemble, chorus, and nine-time (2005–2013) city champion drumline. The drumline also competes at several national tournaments.

Art: King students have received honorable mentions in the Wisconsin Regional Scholastic Art Awards Competition, the Photographic Society of America Awards Competition and the United States Congressional Art Competition.

Theater: Rufus King's theater program is a partner in education initiatives with several professional companies, including Milwaukee Shakespeare, Milwaukee Chamber Theatre, NextAct Theatre, Milwaukee Rep and Spiral Theater. They hold several annual school-wide plays.

Academic Competitions: The school participates in an annual Model UN regional competition, a national Quiz Bowl, the United States Academic Decathlon and LifeSmarts.

Robotics: Rufus King has a robotics program, which includes participation in the FIRST Robotics Competition. The team won the Midwest Regional Championship 2009 and 2011. The team has traveled to the FIRST Championship in 2005, 2006, 2007, 2009, 2011, 2013, 2016, and 2017.

Ethnic and Advocacy Organizations: Rufus King has a variety of ethnic student groups including Asian Club, Black Student Union, French Club, Interfaith, Gay-Straight Alliance, and Latinos Unidos. Every year, an event called "Ethnic Fest" is organized in which many of the ethnic and non-ethnic student groups as well as some honor societies participate in a celebration of culture. Various programs are also put on by individual student groups throughout the year. Rufus King also has a hybrid chapter of both Amnesty International and American Civil Liberties Union, which advocates for human rights and civil liberties issues. In 2011, the group organized a student walkout in opposition to proposed education budget cuts by Governor Scott Walker. In February 2022, King students organized a walkout in response to a shooting that injured five people, four students outside King after a basketball game in order to demand administrative action to bring an end to gun violence.

== Athletics ==
Rufus King Generals

All of Rufus King High School's athletic teams participate in the Milwaukee City Conference and WIAA Division I.

The school has won five Wisconsin state boys' basketball championships. The boys' basketball team achieved a #17 national ranking by USA Today in 2003 and #22 in 2004. The basketball team has received a 69.97 national power ranking by Sports Power. In 2012, both the girls basketball and boys basketball teams went to the state Division 1 basketball finals, though both were unsuccessful.

Rufus King's traditional rivals are Riverside University High School and Ronald Wilson Reagan College Preparatory High School. It is also part of a three-way rivalry with Washington High School and Vincent High School in boys' basketball. These schools have accounted for 14 of the last 23 Division 1 boys' basketball championships in Wisconsin.

RKIHS won a state championship in boys' cross country in 1942.

=== Athletic conference affiliation history ===
- Milwaukee City Conference (1934–1980)
- Suburban Conference (1980–1985)
- Milwaukee City Conference (1985–present)

== Notable alumni ==
- Janelle Adams - professional basketball player
- Margaret Arney - Wisconsin state legislator, first African American city councilmember in Wauwatosa
- Jeannette Bell - politician, Mayor of West Allis, Wisconsin state representative
- Cinmeon Bowers - basketball player
- David Fowlkes Jr. - inventor of Spinner
- Gordon Gano - musician, Violent Femmes
- Warren Giese - politician, South Carolina state legislator and college football coach
- Kalan Haywood - politician, Wisconsin state representative
- Lance Kendricks - former NFL tight end
- Jerris Leonard - politician, Wisconsin legislator, first head of Law Enforcement Assistance Administration
- James R. Lewis - evangelist, salesman, Republican legislator
- Peter Mulvey - musician, folk singer/songwriter
- LaKeshia Myers, Wisconsin state Representative
- Ronald Myers - Baptist minister
- Dayon Ninkovic - professional basketball player
- Jordan Poole - NBA basketball player for the New Orleans Pelicans
- Daniel Riemer - politician, Wisconsin state representative
- Speech - musician, Arrested Development
- Lena Taylor - politician, Wisconsin state senator
- Walter L. Ward, Jr. - politician, Wisconsin state representative
- Michael Weishan - landscape designer, former host of The Victory Garden
- Mike Wilks - NBA basketball player
- Leon Young - politician, Wisconsin state representative
- Josh Zepnick - politician, Wisconsin state representative
- Jerry Ziesmer - film actor and director

== See also ==
- Rufus King Middle Years Program, the feeder middle school for King.
