= The Alliance School =

High school in Wisconsin, United States

Coordinates: 43.0532°N 87.9236°W

Information
- Established: 2005; 21 years ago
- Teaching staff: 14.03 (FTE)
- Grades: 9-12
- Enrollment: 155 (2023-2024)
- Student to teacher ratio: 11.05
- Website: https://k12.mps.school/alliance/

The Alliance School is a public high school located in the city of Milwaukee, Wisconsin, United States. It serves students in grades 9–12.

== Description ==
Alliance is a teacher-led school, headed by lead teacher and co-founder Tina Owen. The enrollment for the 2009–2010 school year was approximately 175. Founded in 2005, the school was located on Galena Street but moved to Walnut Street for the 2009–2010 school year, to an older building which has housed a number of other Milwaukee Public School projects over the decades. It operates on a year-round school calendar, unlike most Milwaukee Public Schools. While Alliance is a charter school, employees are members of the appropriate MPS unions.

Alliance has numerous outreach programs for students, such as an "Art and Social Justice" program headed up by Alliance's dedicated art teacher.

== Recognition ==
Along with New York City's Harvey Milk School, Alliance was cited as a role model for the proposed Social Justice High School-Pride Campus in Chicago, Illinois.

In November 2009, it was awarded the Silver Award (2nd place) as "High Achievement Charter School of the Year" by the Wisconsin Charter Schools Association. In 2011, it received the WCSA's Platinum Award ("Charter School of the Year") as "most accountable, autonomous, innovative and involved charter school".

== Expansion to middle school (defunct) ==
In December 2008, a subcommittee of the Milwaukee Board of School Directors unanimously approved the expansion of Alliance' mission from a high school, to include middle school students as early as 6th grade, making Alliance the United States' first known gay-safe middle school for the coming academic year. Lead Teacher Tina Owen emphasized that Alliance would continue to provide a safe haven for all students suffering harassment, not just gay ones. The creation and expansion of Alliance have been uncontroversial in Milwaukee, Owen observed, compared to reactions in New York and Chicago.

As of 2025, Alliance School no longer offers a middle school. Only grades 9-12 are offered.

== Contract extension ==
A district charter school review team recommended a nonrenewal of the school's contract after the 2009–2010 year because of the school's failure to meet some academic targets spelled out in its agreement with the district, and its failure to comply with some minor paperwork issues. Meanwhile, MPS Superintendent William Andrekopoulos recommended that the board extend Alliance's contract for another year.

On March 9, 2010, the school received a two-year contract extension to improve its academics in a 5–0 vote. The board also agreed that an alternate means of assessment was needed to evaluate the value added the school brings to the district.

== Press coverage ==
An October 2011 report on the ABC News television program 20/20, titled "Milwaukee Public Middle School a Haven for Gay Youth", concentrated on Alliance's unique role as the only known public middle school where out-of-the-closet students are not subject to harassment and pressure due to their sexuality, contrasting Alliance's open atmosphere to the persecution which drove young teens such as Jamey Rodemeyer to suicide. A report later that same month in Time magazine as part of their "What You Need to Know About Bullying" series focused on Alliance' role as a haven for students (not necessarily GLBTQ) who have been bullied at other schools. (A similar emphasis had appeared in a 2010 report in People magazine.) The Time article echoed the arguments against a separate school for children subjected to bullying, yet pointed out that lead teacher Tina Owen still "fields calls nearly every day from parents and administrators... about students who would like to transfer to Alliance", and mentioned that Alliance's charter "is likely to be renewed in the spring [of 2012] without much of a fight".

A 2014 Huffington Post slide show article named Alliance as one of ten of "The Most Interesting High Schools in America".
