= WI FACETS =

American non-profit organization

WI FACETS is a non-profit organization covering the state of Wisconsin that focuses on special education and advocacy skills and is headquartered in Milwaukee, WI. The Wisconsin Family Assistance Center for Education, Training, and Support was founded in 1995 by two parents of children with disabilities, Jan Serak and Charlotte Price. WI FACETS is a Parent Training and Information (PTI) Center funded by the Office of Special Education Programs (OSEP). WI FACETS is also the Regional Technical Assistance Center for the Region 4 PTI and CPRC Centers.

The mission of WI FACETS is to provide and broaden opportunities that enhance the quality of life for children and adults with disabilities and their families, with emphasis on support for underserved families in the community.

WI FACETS currently has 20 staff members throughout the state of Wisconsin that provide information and referral services for parents and consumers, support groups, parent leadership opportunities, and individual assistance.

== National projects ==
=== Region 4 Parent Technical Assistance Center (RPTAC) ===
This program provides technical support to the OSEP-funded parent centers in an 8-state region (Illinois, Indiana, Iowa, Michigan, Minnesota, Missouri, Ohio, and Wisconsin). This includes: serving as a resource to directors and program staff; providing targeted technical assistance related to content, management, outreach, and technology; linking parent centers to current national resources, and facilitating collaboration and communication amongst centers in the region.

== Statewide projects ==
=== Parent Training and Information Center ===
This project provides services to families throughout the state of Wisconsin. A 5-year US Department of Education grant has funded the Center since 2001. The grant supports families and others with training, information and referral, and individual assistance related to children with disabilities and the Individuals with Disabilities Education Act (IDEA).

=== Wisconsin State Personnel Development Grant ===
The SPDG is a federal grant to the WI Dept. of Public Instruction by the Office of Special Education Programs (OSEP) to create a professional development system that will contribute to improved academic, social and transition results for children with disabilities. WI FACETS, a grant partner, works to increase participation of communities, family members and youth in the personnel development system that promotes shared capacity to engage, support and transition children with disabilities, birth to 26.

=== Wisconsin Special Education Mediation System ===
The WI Special Education Mediation System is a collaborative effort between: WI FACETS (representing parent perspective), CESA #7 (representing school perspective), Nina Meierding (representing mediator perspective), and Burns Mediation Services (providing intake and system administration) funded since 1996 by a WI Dept. of Public Instruction discretionary grant to administer the state's system of dispute resolution for special education. WI FACETS provides outreach training and information about mediation, facilitated IEPs and facilitated resolution meetings.

== Local projects ==
=== Milwaukee Public Schools Initiative ===
The MPSI Project, funded by the WI Dept. of Public Instruction, is designed to support parents of children with disabilities living in the City of Milwaukee. This project puts particular focus on helping parents be effective in securing timely and appropriate educational services for their children, by increasing access to skills, knowledge, and resources related to provisions of IDEA, Response to Intervention, Positive Behavioral Supports and Interventions, and literacy. The MPSI Project builds on existing collaborative relationships in the community, while working to forge new relationships. Through the project, parents can access culturally-relevant and community-based training, information and referral, resources, and support.

=== Milwaukee County Transition Advocacy Project ===
The Milwaukee County Transition Advocacy Project, funded by Milwaukee County Advocacy & Consumer Education, provides information, support and training to Milwaukee county youth (typically ages 14–21) and their families. The grant targets underserved populations within the City of Milwaukee while also conducting outreach to families in other areas of Milwaukee County. Project activities include trainings for students, parents and educators on self-advocacy and transition, as well as the Youth Leadership Summit for high school students with disabilities. WI FACETS partners with "IndependenceFirst", a local independent living center, on this program.

== Publications ==
- Serving on Groups that Make Decisions: A Guide for Families (2011)
- The Unauthorized Practice of Law for Parent Centers (2011)
- Personnel & HR Issues for Parent Centers (2010)
- OSEP Dialogue Guides: Parentally-Placed Children in Private Schools, IEPs, Transition, and Universal Design (2008–2010)
- Out of Darkness. . .Into the Light: New Approaches to Reducing Seclusion and Restraint with Wisconsin Children (2009)
- OSEP IDEA Partnership Creating Agreement Curriculum (2009)
- Special Education in Plain Language (2009)
- Seclusion and Restraint in Wisconsin Schools: Information for Parents (2008)
- WI FACETS Parent Leader Manual (2007)
- Effective Participation in Special Education Mediation (2007)
- Resolution Session Manual: A Guide for Parents and Educators (2006)
- Involving Families in Meeting Students' Needs: A Guide for School Staff (2005)
- Opening Doors: A Guide to Adult Services and Funding (2005)
- Opening Doors: An Introduction to Transition (2005)
- Opening Doors to Transition and the Individual Education Program (2005)

== See also ==
- IDEA 2004
- Office of Special Education Programs
- Special Education
- Wisconsin Department of Public Instruction
- Milwaukee Public Schools
