= Dayon Ninkovic =

Serbian-American basketball player

Personal information
- Born: March 20, 1976 (age 50) Milwaukee, Wisconsin, U.S.
- Listed height: 6 ft 9 in (2.06 m)
- Listed weight: 242 lb (110 kg)

Career information
- High school: Rufus King (Milwaukee, Wisconsin)
- College: Bowling Green (1994–1997); UW–Parkside (1997–1998)
- NBA draft: 1998: undrafted
- Playing career: 1998–2006
- Position: Power forward / center
- Number: 4, 44

Career history
- 1998: Crvena zvezda
- 2001: Vichy-Clermont
- 2001: Évreux Athletic
- 2001: Leiria
- 2001–2002: Portugal Telecom
- 2002: CAB Madeira
- 2003: Aix Maurienne
- 2004: Entente Orléanaise Loiret
- 2004–2005: Golbey-Épinal
- 2006: Venados de Mazatlán

Dayon Ninkovic (born March 20, 1976) is a Serbian-American former professional basketball player.

== Amateur career ==
Ninkovic began playing basketball for the first time as a freshman in high school because he was told that he "could probably get a free education" out of it. At the time, he was 6 feet 5 inches (1.96 m) but, in his words, had "no athletic ability." Ninkovic attended Rufus King International High School where, in 1993–94, he was named the Gatorade Player of the Year for Wisconsin.

Ninkovic played college basketball at Bowling Green and UW–Parkside. As a senior with the Rangers, he received a Great Lakes Valley Conference honorable mention for the 1997–98 season.

== Professional career ==
During his playing days as a both power forward and center, Ninkovic played for Crvena zvezda (Yugoslavia), Évreux Athletic and Vichy-Clermont in France, than in Portugal for Leiria, Portugal Telecom, and CAB Madeira, in France for Aix Maurienne, Entente Orléanaise Loiret, and Golbey-Épinal, and in Mexico for Venados de Mazatlán.
