= Janelle Adams =

American professional basketball player

Personal information
- Born: August 17, 1990 (age 36) Milwaukee, Wisconsin
- Listed height: 5 ft 9 in (1.75 m)

Career information
- High school: Rufus King (Milwaukee, Wisconsin)
- College: Cleveland State (2008–2012)
- WNBA draft: 2012: undrafted
- Playing career: 2012–present
- Position: Guard

Career history
- 2012–2015: Toowoomba Mountaineers (Australia)
- 2016: Brisbane Spartans (Australia)
- 2016–2017: Canberra Capitals (Australia)

Janelle Adams (born August 17, 1990) is an American professional basketball player. She currently plays for the Canberra Capitals in the WNBL.

== College ==
Adams played college basketball at Cleveland State University in Cleveland, Ohio for the Vikings. During her time at Cleveland State, Adams was a strong combo guard and one of the teams premier defenders.

=== Cleveland State statistics ===
Legend
GP	Games played	GS	Games started	MPG	Minutes per game
FG%	Field goal percentage	3P%	3-point field goal percentage	FT%	Free throw percentage
RPG	Rebounds per game	APG	Assists per game	SPG	Steals per game
BPG	Blocks per game	PPG	Points per game	**Bold**	Career high

Year	Team	GP	Points	FG%	3P%	FT%	RPG	APG	SPG	BPG	PPG
2008-09	Cleveland State	31	85	32.7%	21.4%	57.1%	2.1	0.4	0.5	0.2	2.7
2009-10	Cleveland State	28	141	37.4%	15.6%	61.9%	3.8	1.4	0.7	0.3	5.0
2010-11	Cleveland State	**33**	**324**	**40.6%**	**20.8%**	68.1%	**5.1**	**3.1**	**1.5**	**0.6**	**9.8**
2011-12	Cleveland State	25	127	35.0%	0.0%	**77.1%**	2.9	2.3	0.8	0.5	5.1
Career		117	677	37.6%	11.1%	66.8%	16.2	1.8	0.9	0.4	5.8

== Professional career ==
=== Australia ===
In 2012, Adams began her professional career in Queensland, Australia with the Toowoomba Mountaineers in the Queensland Basketball League. After three seasons with the Mountaineers, Adams travelled into the city, signing with the Brisbane Spartans and raising her level by playing in the South East Australian Basketball League. Adams was then signed by the Canberra Capitals to play in the Women's National Basketball League, Australia's premier women's league and the strongest league in the southern hemisphere. This is the highest level of basketball Adams has participated in. Here, she will play alongside the likes of Marianna Tolo and Lauren Mansfield.
