= WITI =

WITI may refer to:

- Witi, a location in Ethiopia
- Witi (born 1996), Mozambican professional footballer
- Witi Ihimaera (born 1944), New Zealand author
- Witi language, alternative spelling for Wiri, an Aboriginal Australian language of Queensland
- WITI (TV), a television station (channel 31, virtual 6) licensed to Milwaukee, Wisconsin, United States
  - WITI TV Tower
- Wojskowy Instytut Techniki Inżynieryjnej (Military Institute of Engineering Equipment), Poland
- Women in Technology International
