= Milwaukee School of Languages =

Milwaukee School of Languages (MSL)

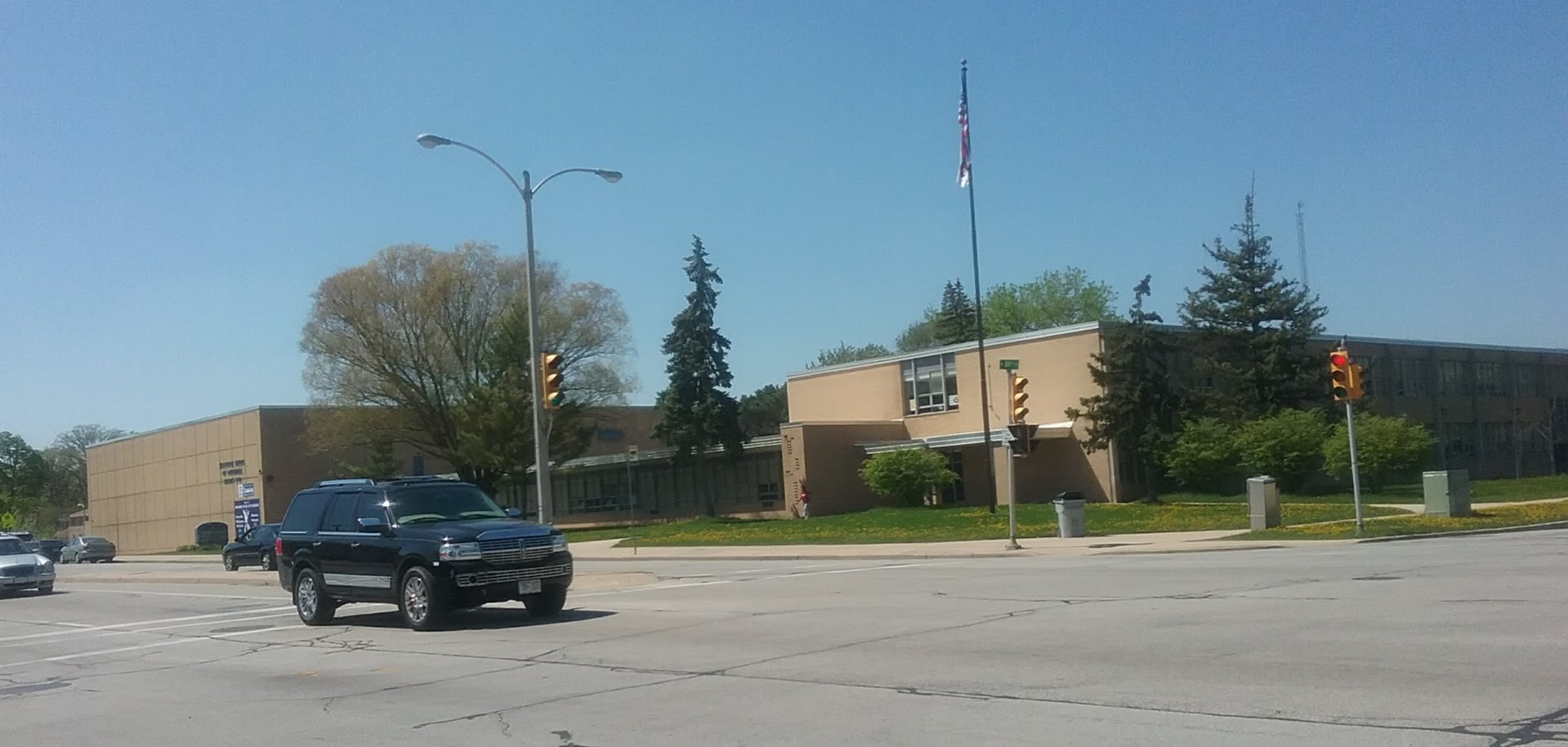
- MSL on a sunny afternoon on May 16th 2018

Location
- 8400 W. Burleigh St. Milwaukee, Wisconsin; United States
- Coordinates: 42.0602°N 87.8625°W

Information
- School type: Public Secondary
- Opened: 1956
- Status: open
- School district: Milwaukee Public Schools
- Superintendent: Keith P. Posley
- Principal: Juan Baez
- Staff: 68.06 (FTE)
- Grades: 6–12
- Gender: Coeducational
- Enrollment: 985 (2023–24)
- Student to teacher ratio: 14.47
- Language: English, Spanish, French, German, and Italian
- Campus type: Urban
- Colors: blue white
- Fight song: The Final Countdown
- Mascot: Hawk
- Team name: Hawks
- Newspaper: Hawk Squawk
- Yearbook: The Hawk
- Website: mps.school/msl/

The Milwaukee School of Languages (MSL) is a 6–12 grade public school in the Milwaukee Public Schools district of Wisconsin, United States. It was formerly named the Wilbur Wright Multi-Language Middle School.

In addition to common core standards, students participate in immersion programs in Spanish, German, and French. Students can also take a partial immersion program in Spanish. Courses are also offered in Italian. This school welcomes many exchange students from all over the world every year.

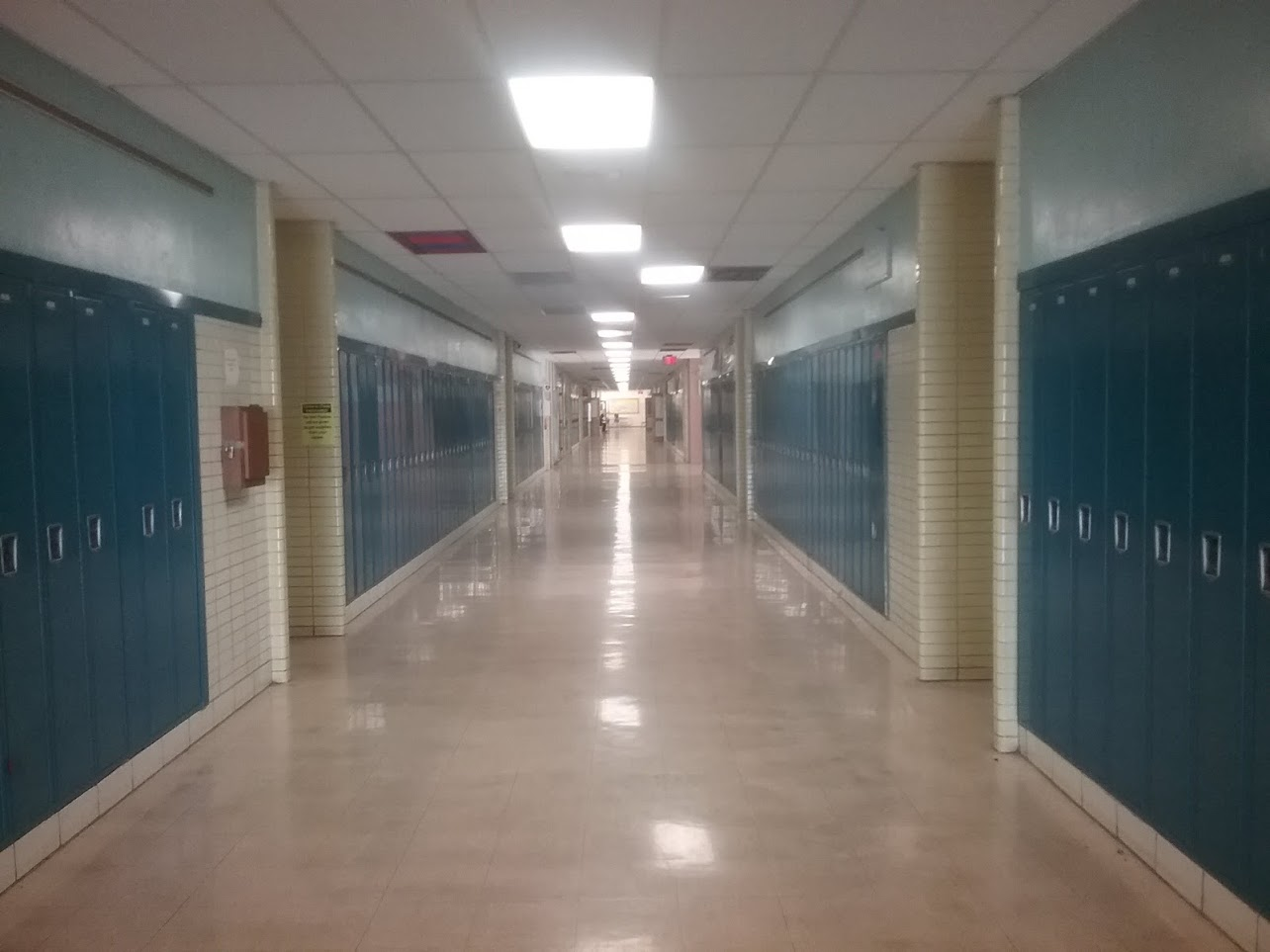
The hallways of MSL

== History ==
Wilbur Wright middle school was constructed in 1956.

The school first offered immersion programs for middle school students in 1986, and added high school grades in 1996.

== Extracurricular activities, sports and clubs ==
MSL offers many different clubs and extracurricular activities.

=== Clubs ===
- Chess Club (Only available if done at previous immersion school)
- (Forensics) Speech & Debate
- Newspaper
- Theater
- Gender Sexuality Alliance (Known as GSA among students)
- Environmental Club
- Art Club (Highschool-Only with exceptions)
- Jazz Club (Highschool-Only)
- Bead Club (Middle School Only)
- DND

=== Extracurricular activities ===
- Special Olympics
- Girl Scouts (Only available if done at previous immersion school)
- Pearls For Teen Girls

=== Sports ===
- Track & Field (Separate Girl and Boys teams)
- Cross Country (Co-ed)
- Basketball (Separate Girl and Boys teams)
- Volleyball (Girls)
- Soccer (Separate Girls and Boys teams)

== Students ==
Milwaukee School of Languages has an ethnically diverse student body as of 2022:

- Black or African American, 49.4%
- White, 23.3%
- Hispanic/Latino, 18.7%
- Asian, 4.6%
- Two or more Races, 3.6%
- American Indian or Alaskan Native, 0.2%
- Native Hawaiian or Other Pacific Islander, 0.2%

53% of students were female while 47% were male.

== Athletics and activities ==
In 2007, the MSL Boys Track and Field team won the WIAA D1 state title. Alumnus such as Quentin Luttrell, Zachary Sharkey-Ketner, Jonathan Fobbs and Antwon Terry led the team to victory.

== Notable alumni ==
- Jade-Lianna Peters, actress, voice of Kai-Lan of Ni Hao, Kai-Lan
- Josiah Williams, Christian Hip-Hop Artist / Rhythmic Soul | WWE On-Air Talent for the NXT Creator of Wrestle and Flow.
- Buffalo Nichols, blues guitarist & singer
- Zed Kenzo, Milwaukee area rapper, winner of 2019 Radio Milwaukee Music Awards

== See also ==
- Milwaukee Public Schools
