= Milwaukee Excel High School =

School in Milwaukee, Wisconsin, United States

Coordinates: 43°02′35.0″N 87°58′17.3″W

Milwaukee Excel High School (MEHS) was an alternative academic charter school in the Milwaukee Public Schools district in Milwaukee, Wisconsin. The school opened in 2011 and was closed for 2013-14 because of low enrollment and academic reasons.
