= Rufus King International Middle School =

Middle school in Milwaukee, Wisconsin

Coordinates: 43°04′08.5″N 87°54′37.5″W

Rufus King International Middle School is a public magnet intermediate school located on the north side of Milwaukee, Wisconsin, part of the Milwaukee Public Schools district. It was launched in September 2010 in the Ronald McNair building.

The middle school, which began its first school year in 2010, is part of the 6-12 program of Rufus King International School. The program incorporates the International Baccalaureate Middle Years Programme.

The curriculum includes English, math, science, social studies, Spanish, and an engineering program. Electives include physical education, music and art.
