= Milwaukee Public Schools =

School district in Milwaukee, Wisconsin

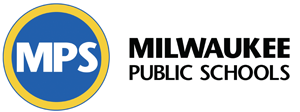

Address
- 5225 West Vliet Street Milwaukee, Wisconsin, 53208; United States
- Coordinates: 43°02′55″N 87°58′47″W

District information
- Type: Public school district
- Grades: Pre-K–12
- Established: 1846; 180 years ago
- Superintendent: Dr. Brenda Cassellius
- Schools: 154
- NCES District ID: 5509600

Students and staff
- Enrollment: 66,864 (2023–2024)
- Teachers: 3,857.63 (on an FTE basis)
- Staff: 5,642.49
- Student–teacher ratio: 17.33:1

Other information
- Website: www.milwaukeepublicschools.org

Milwaukee Public Schools (MPS) is the largest school district in Wisconsin. As of the 2023–24 school year, MPS served 66,864 students in 154 schools and had 9,500 full-time equivalent (FTE) staff positions. A publicly elected school board, the Milwaukee Board of School Directors, provides direction and oversight, with a superintendent heading the organization's administration.

The district includes all portions of Milwaukee in Milwaukee County, which means it includes almost all of Milwaukee.

Milwaukee Public Schools' offerings include neighborhood schools, specialty schools and charter schools serving students from age 3 through grade 12.

== History ==
Milwaukee Public Schools Administration Building

In winter 1836 the first public school in Milwaukee opened. The school board was established in 1846.

In 1990 the Wisconsin Legislature passed a law which allowed MPS-zoned students to attend private schools on school vouchers.

In 2008 the district had 78,148 students.

In 2013 the group Public Policy Forum published a report which compared MPS schools with Milwaukee Parental Choice Program private schools (the ones which take school voucher students). According to the report, the MPS schools had slightly better student performance.

In fall 2022 the district had 58,136 students.

== Programs ==
Specialty programs in MPS include arts schools such as Milwaukee High School of the Arts; career and technical education schools such as Lynde & Harry Bradley Technology and Trade School; gifted and talented schools such as Golda Meir School; International Baccalaureate and college prep high schools such as Rufus King International School – High School Campus, Riverside University High School and Ronald Reagan College Preparatory High School; language immersion schools including French, German, Italian, and Spanish immersion elementary schools and Milwaukee School of Languages for middle- and high-school students; and a large number of Montessori schools.

The district owns WYMS-FM (88.9), which airs an eclectic selection of music and is programmed by a local non-profit group via a local marketing agreement.

== Performance ==
While overall reading and math proficiency rates are below the state average and below those of some other large city districts, the district did see some growth in scores in both subjects and both grades tested on the 2013 National Assessment of Educational Progress and on the 2012–13 state standardized tests, MPS students, on the whole, outperformed Milwaukee students receiving publicly funded vouchers to attend private schools.

School district officials note declining funding as a catalyst to problems in the district.

The Wisconsin Department of Public Instruction in its 2011−12 School District Performance Report listed Milwaukee's regular diploma graduation rate at 66.2%.

In 2012, Rufus King International School – High School Campus was ranked the 130th best public high school in the nation, making it the top performing school in the state of Wisconsin. Ronald Reagan College Preparatory High School was ranked second in Wisconsin, while Milwaukee School of Languages was ranked seventh.

== Charter schools ==
In 1990, Milwaukee became the first community in the United States to adopt a school voucher program. The program enables students to receive public funding to study at parochial and other private schools free of cost. The 2006−07 school year marked the first time that more than $100 million was paid in vouchers, as 26% of Milwaukee students receive public funding to attend schools outside the MPS system.

Under Wisconsin state law, the Milwaukee school board is one of several entities that can authorize charter schools in the city. Other authorities that can authorize charter schools are the Milwaukee City Council, the University of Wisconsin–Milwaukee, and the Milwaukee Area Technical College Board. The first charter school in Milwaukee was the Highland Community School, a Montessori elementary school authorized by Milwaukee Public Schools in 1996.

== Schools ==
An asterisk (*) indicates a charter school.

=== Early Childhood Education ===
- Grant Gordon Learning Center

=== K4–K schools ===
- Next Door Foundation School *

=== K–7 schools ===
- Lloyd Barbee Montessori School

=== K–8 schools ===
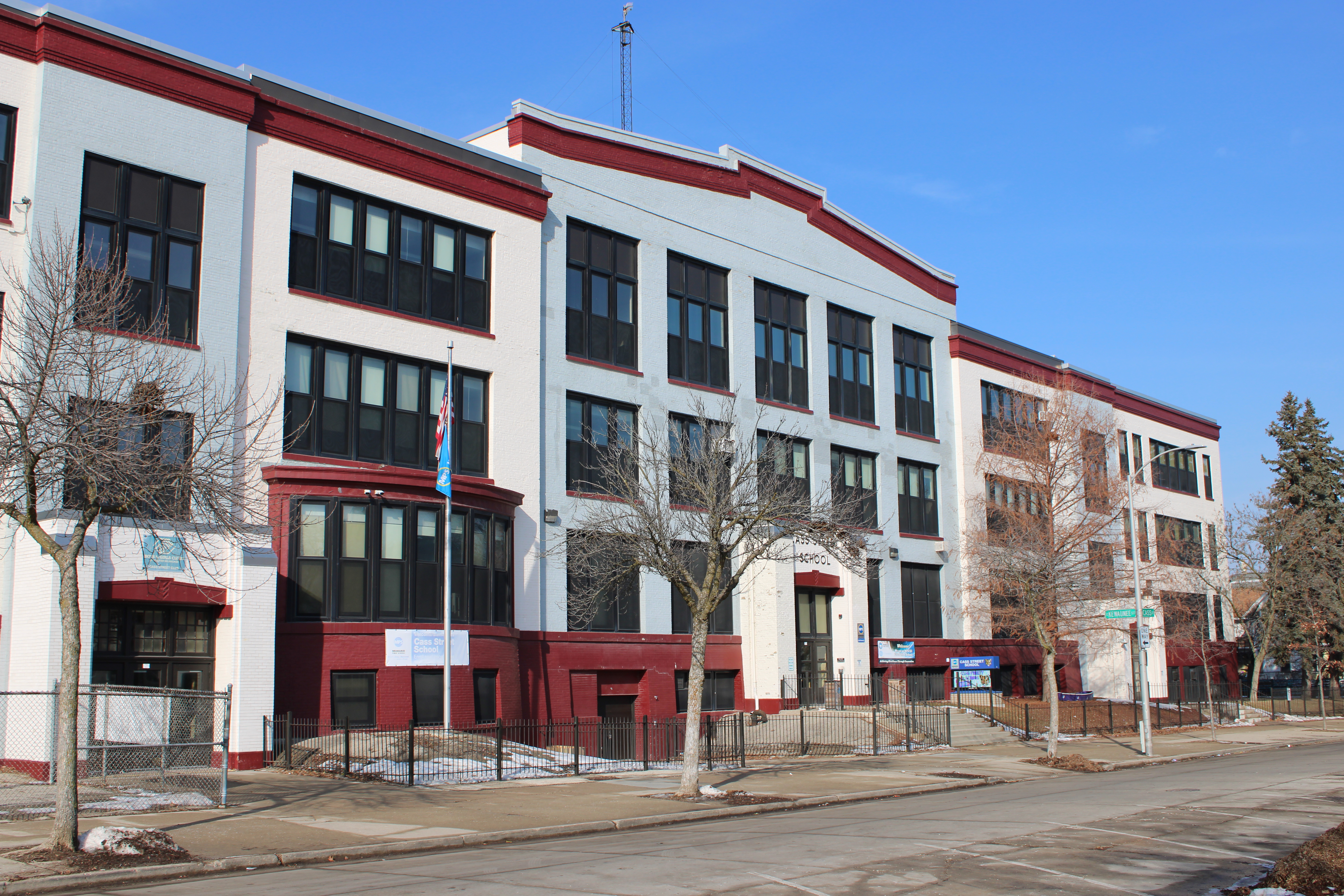
Cass Street School

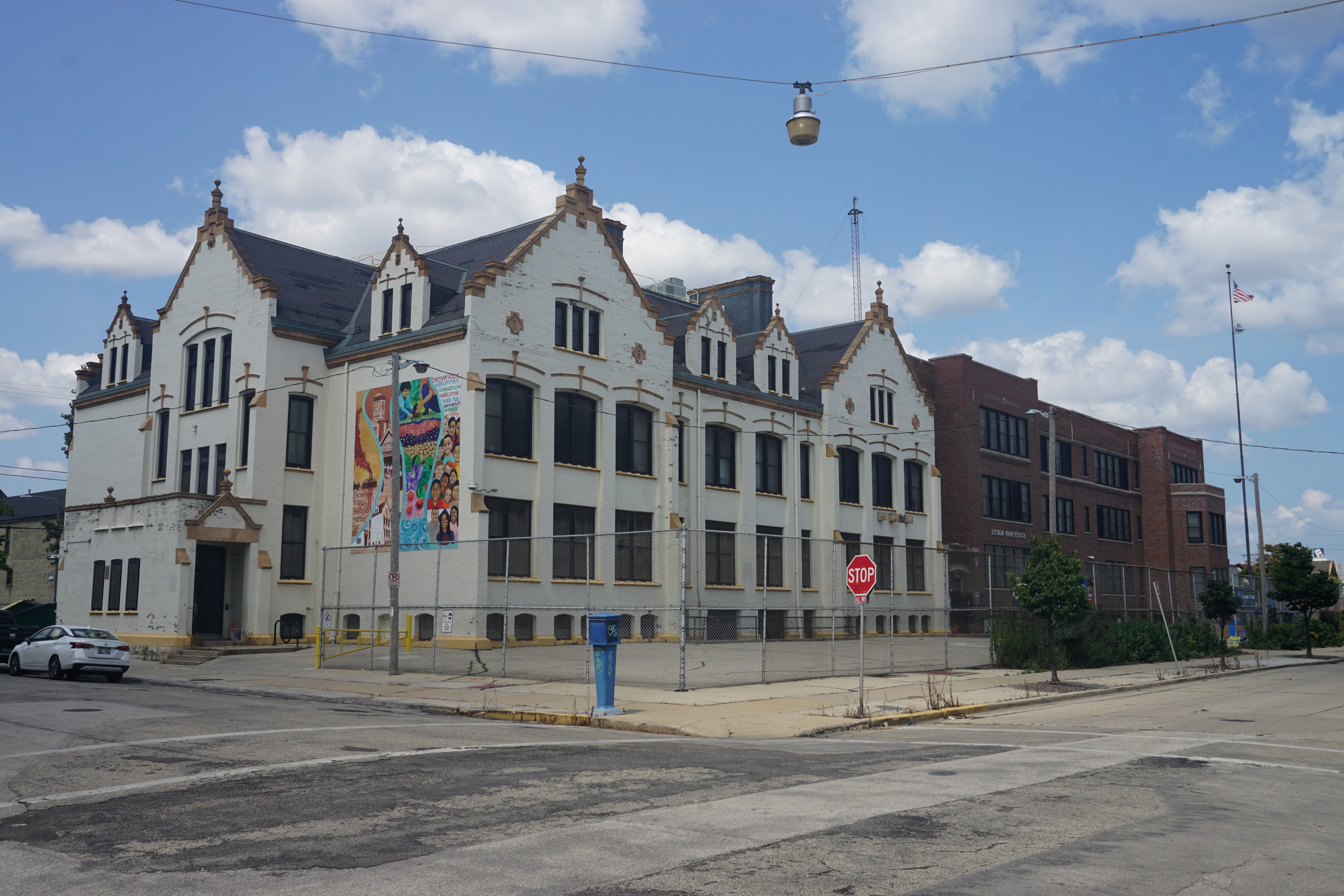
Escuela Vieau Public School

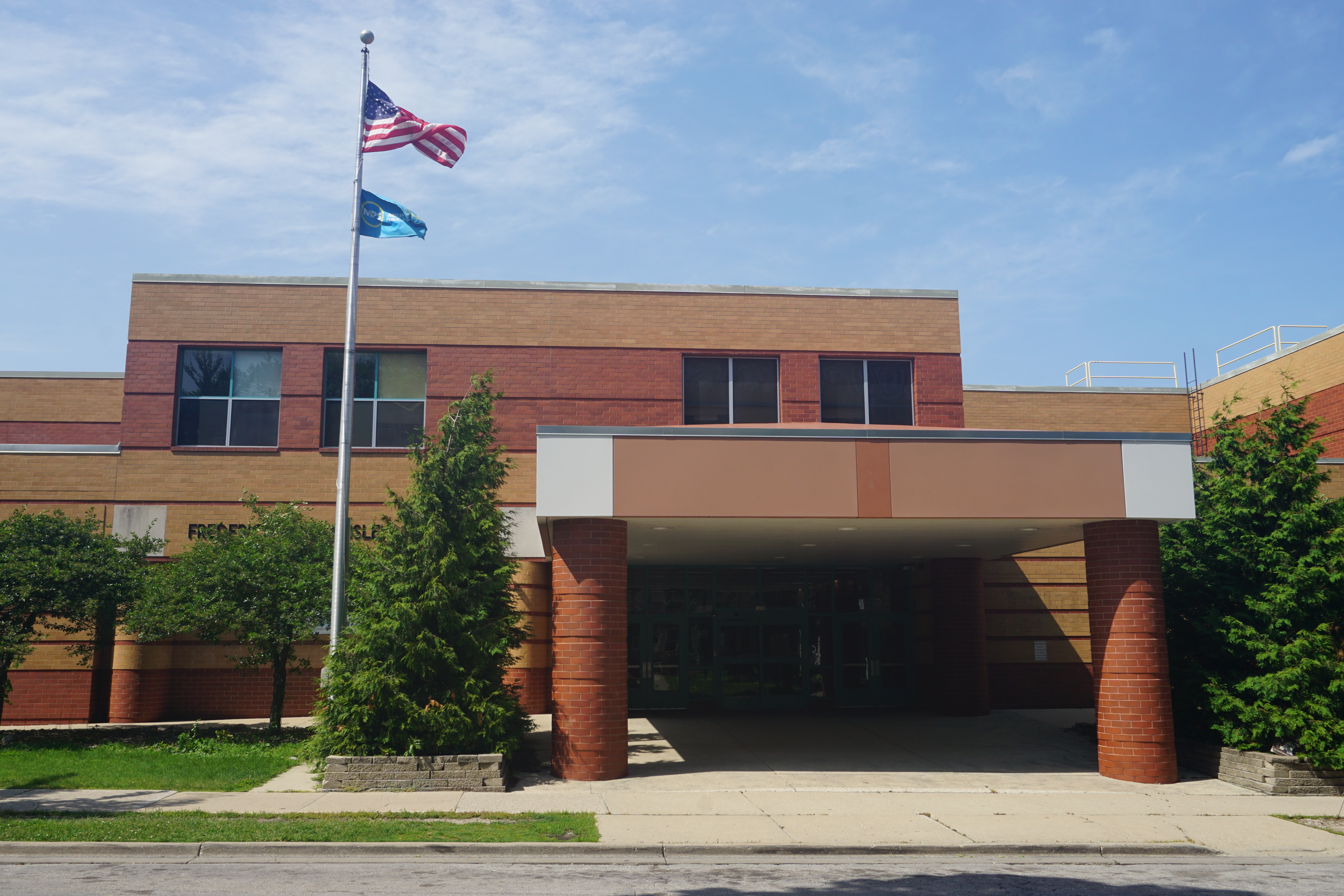
Gaenslen Elementary School

- Academia de Lenguaje y Bellas Artes (ALBA) *
- Bay View Montessori School
- Luther Burbank Elementary School (Milwaukee)|Luther Burbank Elementary School
- A.E. Burdick School
- Mary McLeod Bethune Academy
- Dr. Benjamin Carson Academy of Science
- George Washington Carver Academy of Mathematics and Science
- Cass St. School
- Clement Ave. School
- Congress School
- James Fenimore Cooper Elementary School
- Craig Montessori School
- Jeremiah Curtin Leadership Academy
- Eighty-First St. Elementary School
- Fairview Public School
- Fernwood Montessori School
- Frederick J. Gaenslen School
- Benjamin Franklin School
- Hamlin Garland School
- U.S. Grant Elementary School
- Grantosa Dr. Elementary School
- Greenfield Bilingual School
- Hartford Ave. University School
- Highland Community School *
- Hi-Mount Blvd. School
- Oliver Wendell Holmes Elementary School
- Humboldt Park School
- I.D.E.A.L. (Individualized Developmental Educational Approaches to Learning) School *
- Keefe Ave. Elementary School
- Martin Luther King Jr. School
- La Causa Charter School *
- Robert M. La Follette Elementary School
- Lancaster School
- Henry Wadsworth Longfellow Elementary School
- Manitoba Elementary School
- Maryland Ave. Montessori School
- Ralph H. Metcalfe School
- Milwaukee Academy of Chinese Language
- Milwaukee College Prep–36th St. Campus *
- Milwaukee College Prep–38th St. Campus *
- Milwaukee College Prep–Lloyd St. Campus *
- Milwaukee College Prep Lola Rowe–North Campus *
- Milwaukee Environmental Sciences Academy *
- Milwaukee Parkside School for the Arts
- Milwaukee Sign Language School
- Alexander Mitchell Integrated Arts Elementary School
- Rogers St. Academy
- William T. Sherman Multicultural Arts Elementary School
- Albert Story School
- Henry David Thoreau Elementary School
- Townsend Street School
- Trowbridge St. Elementary School
- Victory K8 and Milwaukee Italian Immersion School
- Vieau School (Escuela Vieau)
- Westside Academy
- Thurston Woods Campus Elementary School

=== Elementary schools (grades K–5) ===
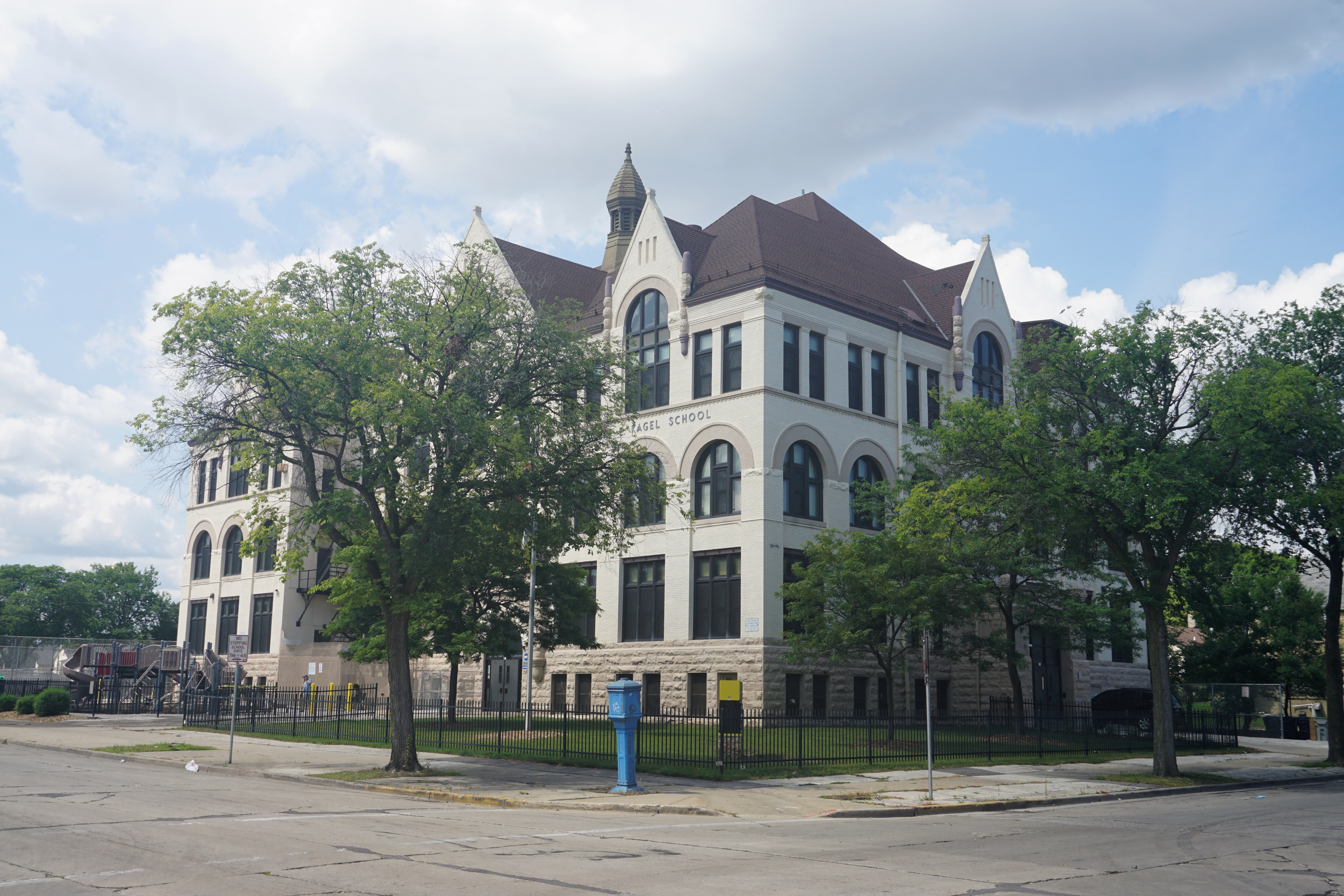
Albert E. Kagel School

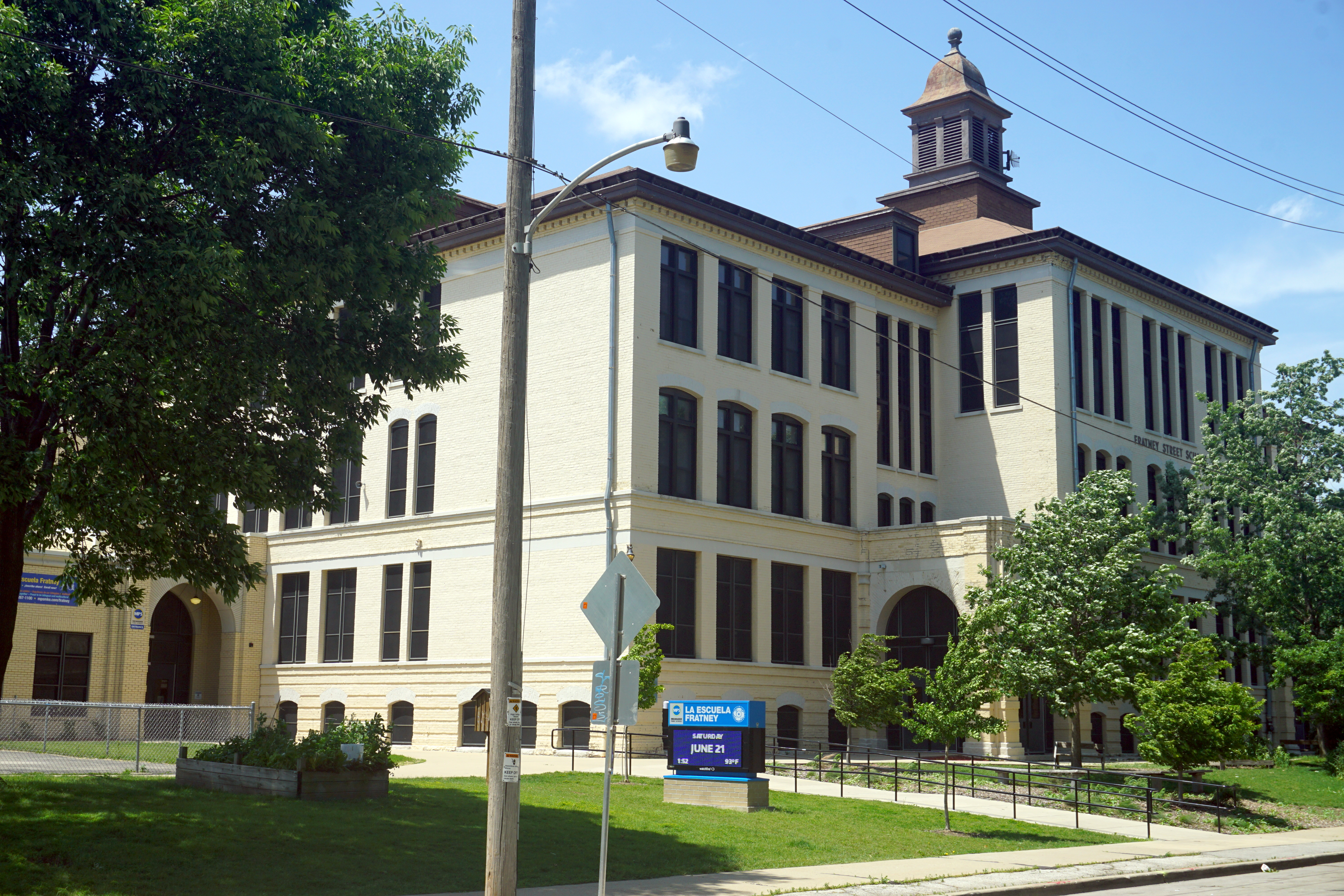
La Escuela Fratney Elementary School

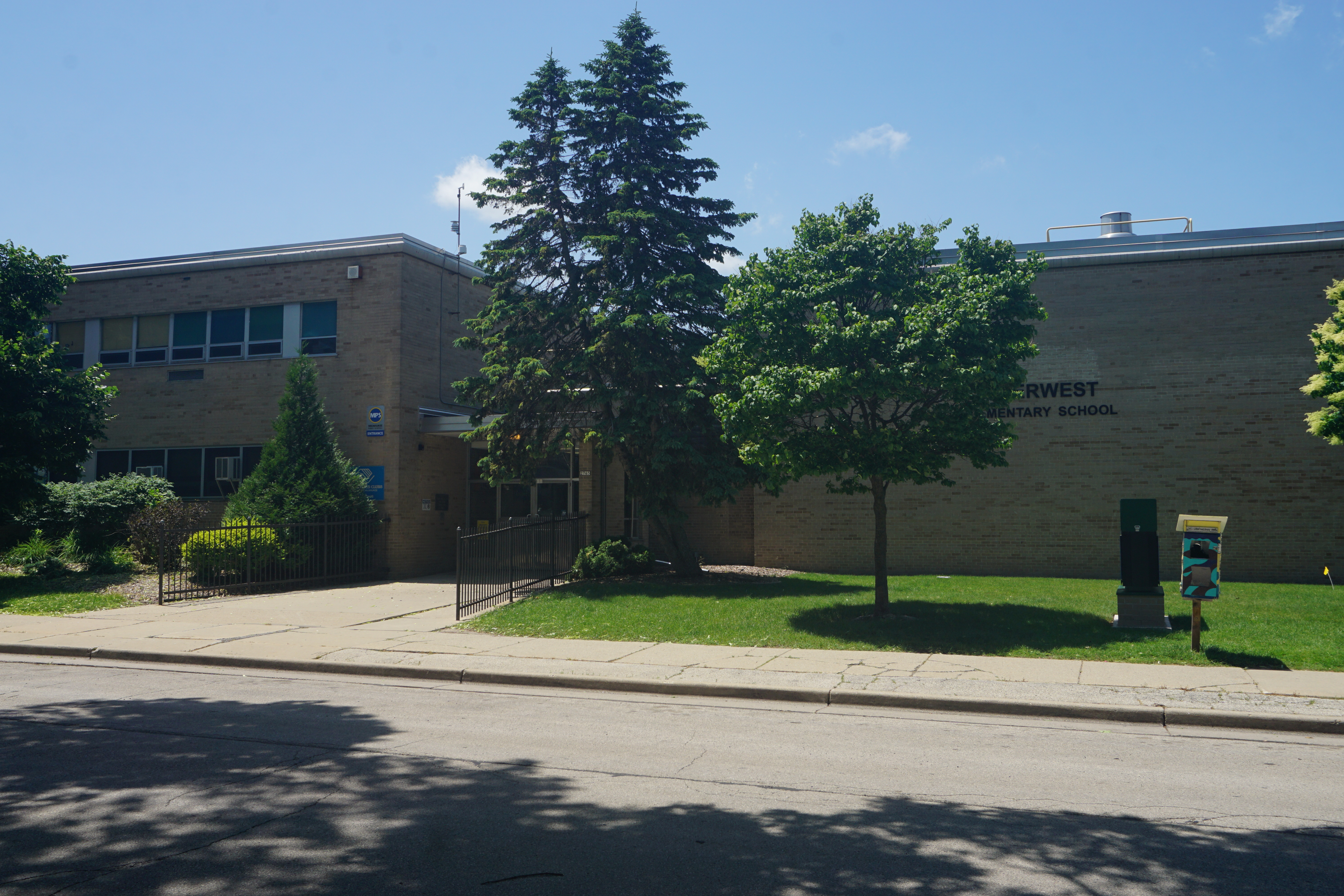
Riverwest Elementary School

- Academy of Accelerated Learning
- Louisa May Alcott School
- Allen-Field School
- Auer Ave. Elementary School
- Lloyd Barbee Montessori School
- Clara Barton School
- Brown St. Academy
- Browning School
- William George Bruce School
- William Cullen Bryant School
- Clarke St. Elementary School
- Samuel Clemens School
- Congress School
- Anna F. Doerfler School
- Elm Creative Arts School
- Ralph Waldo Emerson School
- Engleburg School
- Fifty-Third St. School
- Forest Home Ave. School
- Fratney School (La Escuela Fratney)
- Lowell P. Goodrich School
- Hampton School
- Hawley Environmental School
- Nathaniel Hawthorne School
- Hayes Bilingual School
- Honey Creek Continuous Progress Charter School *
- Albert E. Kagel School
- Byron Kilbourn School
- Richard Kluge School
- Lincoln Ave. Community School
- Lowell International Elementary School
- Hopkins Lloyd Community School
- Maple Tree School
- Marvin Pratt Elementary School
- Milwaukee French Immersion School
- Milwaukee German Immersion School
- Milwaukee Spanish Immersion School
- Morgandale School
- Neeskara School
- Ninety-Fifth St. School
- Parkview Elementary School
- James Whitcomb Riley Dual-Language Montessori School
- River Trail Elementary School
- Riverwest Elementary School
- Siefert Elementary School
- Frances Brock Starms Discovery Learning Center
- Frances Brock Starms Early Childhood Center
- Gilbert Stuart Elementary School
- Walt Whitman Elementary School
- Whittier School *
- Clement J. Zablocki Elementary School

=== Middle schools (grades 6–8) ===
- Audubon Technology & Communication Center Middle School
- Douglas Middle School
- Lincoln Center of the Arts Middle School
- Roosevelt Middle School of the Arts
- Rufus King International Middle School
- Wedgewood Park International School

=== Middle and high schools (grades 6–12) ===
- Carmen Middle/High School of Science and Technology-Northwest Campus *
- Green Tree Preparatory Academy
- Lad Lake Synergy (Alternative Education)
- Milwaukee School of Languages
- Samuel Morse John Marshall School for the Gifted and Talented

=== K–12 schools ===
- Hmong American Peace Academy *
- MacDowell Montessori School
- Barack Obama School of Career Technical and Education
- Wisconsin Conservatory of Lifelong Learning

=== 3–12 Schools ===
- Golda Meir School

=== High schools (grades 9–12) ===
- The Alliance School*
- Assata High School (Alternative Education)
- Audubon Technology and Communication Center High School
- Banner Prep School Of Milwaukee (Alternative Education)
- Barack Obama School of Career and Technical Education
- Bay View High School
- Lynde and Harry Bradley Technology and Trade School
- Carmen High School of Science and Technology (South Campus) *
- Grandview High School (Alternative Education)
- James E. Groppi High School (Alternative Education)
- Alexander Hamilton High School
- Rufus King International High School
- James Madison Academic Campus
- John Marshall High School
- Milwaukee Excel High School
- Milwaukee High School of the Arts
- Milwaukee School of Languages
- North Division High School
- Casimir Pulaski High School
- Riverside University High School
- Ronald Wilson Reagan College Preparatory High School
- South Division High School
- Harold S. Vincent High School
- Washington High School of Information Technology

== See also ==
- WI FACETS
