= Scenic Central Conference =

Wisconsin high school athletic conference (1958–1979)

The Scenic Central Conference is a former high school athletic conference in Wisconsin, founded in 1958 as an all-sport circuit and ending operations in 1979. Members were concentrated in the state's Driftless Area and affiliated with the Wisconsin Interscholastic Athletic Association.

== History ==
=== 1958–1971 ===
Location of Original Scenic Central Conference Members

The Scenic Central Conference was originally formed in 1948 as a football-only conference among four small schools in western Wisconsin: Hillsboro, New Lisbon, Westby and Wonewoc. Ten years later, the Scenic Central became an all-sports conference when two previously established conferences merged: the Juneau County League (Elroy, Hillsboro, New Lisbon, Westby and Wonewoc) and the Monroe-Vernon Conference (Cashton, Kendall, Norwalk, Ontario and Wilton). Both conferences had experienced loss of members due to consolidation and defection to other conferences, and merged to preserve the athletic future of their member schools. After formation of the conference, consolidation continued to have its effect on schools in the Driftless Area, with Elroy and Kendall merging to create Royall in 1959 and Norwalk and Ontario merging to form Brookwood in 1960. The conference also lost Wilton in 1963 to consolidation into the Royall School District, they were replaced by Weston (formerly of the I-W League) to keep membership at eight schools. A ninth school was added when Kickapoo joined the Scenic Central Conference in 1965. A year later, New Lisbon and Royall left the Scenic Central to help form the short-lived Vacationland Conference. De Soto and North Crawford joined from the Kickapoo Valley League to take their place. Two years later, La Farge High School followed their Kickapoo Valley brethren into the Scenic Central Conference, and New Lisbon and Royall rejoined the Scenic Central after the Vacationland Conference disbanded in 1970.

=== 1971–1979 ===
1971 saw the Scenic Central Conference add three new members: Ithaca, Seneca and Wauzeka. All three schools came from the Kickapoo Valley League, which had disbanded after the previous school year. To accommodate the rapid growth of the Scenic Central into a fifteen-member loop, members were subdivided into Northern and Southern Divisions:

Location of Scenic Central Conference Members (1971-1977)

Northern Division	Southern Division
Cashton	Brookwood
De Soto	Ithaca
Hillsboro	La Farge
Kickapoo	Seneca
New Lisbon	Wauzeka
North Crawford	Weston
Royall	Wonewoc-Center
Westby	

The conference would continue with this alignment for six seasons before Royall and Westby left to join the Coulee Conference in 1977. They exchanged conference affiliations with Bangor, who joined the Scenic Central for the last two years of its existence. Brookwood, Weston and Wonewoc-Center also exchanged divisions with De Soto, Kickapoo and North Crawford:

Location of Final Scenic Central Conference Members

Northern Division	Southern Division
Bangor	De Soto
Brookwood	Ithaca
Cashton	Kickapoo
Hillsboro	La Farge
New Lisbon	North Crawford
Weston	Seneca
Wonewoc-Center	Wauzeka

The Scenic Central split into two conferences after the 1978–79 school year, with the seven schools in the Southern Division plus Weston forming the Ridge & Valley Conference and six remaining schools in the Northern Division joining with Necedah and former Scenic Central member Royall to create the Scenic Bluffs Conference.

== Conference membership history ==
=== Final members ===
School	Location	Affiliation	Mascot	Colors	Joined	Left	Conference Joined	Current Conference
Bangor	Bangor, WI	Public	Cardinals		1977	1979	Scenic Bluffs	
Brookwood	Ontario, WI	Public	Falcons		1960	1979	Scenic Bluffs	
Cashton	Cashton, WI	Public	Eagles		1958	1979	Scenic Bluffs	
De Soto	De Soto, WI	Public	Pirates		1966	1979	Ridge & Valley	
Hillsboro	Hillsboro, WI	Public	Tigers		1958	1979	Scenic Bluffs	
Ithaca	Ithaca, WI	Public	Bulldogs		1971	1979	Ridge & Valley	
Kickapoo	Viola, WI	Public	Panthers		1965	1979	Ridge & Valley	
La Farge	La Farge, WI	Public	Wildcats		1968	1979	Ridge & Valley	
New Lisbon	New Lisbon, WI	Public	Rockets		1958, 1970	1966, 1979	Vacationland, Scenic Bluffs	Scenic Bluffs
North Crawford	Soldiers Grove, WI	Public	Trojans		1966	1979	Ridge & Valley	
Seneca	Seneca, WI	Public	Indians		1971	1979	Ridge & Valley	
Wauzeka	Wauzeka, WI	Public	Hornets		1971	1979	Ridge & Valley	
Weston	Cazenovia, WI	Public	Silver Eagles		1963	1979	Ridge & Valley	
Wonewoc-Center	Wonewoc, WI	Public	Indians		1958	1979	Scenic Bluffs	

=== Previous members ===
School	Location	Affiliation	Mascot	Colors	Joined	Left	Conference Joined	Current Conference
Elroy	Elroy, WI	Public	Hilltoppers		1958	1959	Closed (consolidated into Royall)	
Kendall	Kendall, WI	Public	Mustangs		1958	1959	Closed (consolidated into Royall)	
Norwalk	Norwalk, WI	Public	Hawks		1958	1960	Closed (consolidated into Brookwood)	
Ontario	Ontario, WI	Public	Wildcats		1958	1960	Closed (consolidated into Brookwood)	
Royall	Elroy, WI	Public	Panthers		1959, 1970	1966, 1977	Vacationland, Coulee	Scenic Bluffs
Westby	Westby, WI	Public	Norsemen		1958	1977	Coulee	
Wilton	Wilton, WI	Public	Warriors		1958	1963	Closed (consolidated into Royall)	

=== Football-only members ===
School	Location	Affiliation	Mascot	Colors	Seasons	Primary Conference
Hillsboro	Hillsboro, WI	Public	Tigers		1948-1957	Juneau County
New Lisbon	New Lisbon, WI	Public	Rockets		1948-1957	Juneau County
Westby	Westby, WI	Public	Norsemen		1948-1957	West Central, Juneau County
Wonewoc	Wonewoc, WI	Public	Indians		1948-1957	Juneau County
Elroy	Elroy, WI	Public	Hilltoppers		1951-1957	Juneau County
Kendall	Kendall, WI	Public	Mustangs		1951-1952	Monroe-Vernon
Muscoda	Muscoda, WI	Public	Indians		1951-1952	Wisconsin River
Cashton	Cashton, WI	Public	Eagles		1953-1957	Monroe-Vernon
De Soto	De Soto, WI	Public	Pirates		1954-1965	Kickapoo Valley

== Membership timeline ==
=== Full members ===
Northern Division Southern Division

=== Football members ===
Northern Division Southern Division

== List of state champions ==
=== Fall sports ===
Football
School	Year	Division
De Soto	1976	Division 4

=== Winter sports ===
None

=== Spring sports ===
Boys Track & Field
School	Year	Division
North Crawford	1976	Class C

== List of conference champions ==
=== Boys Basketball ===
School	Quantity	Years
Hillsboro	10	1959, 1960, 1961, 1962, 1963, 1966, 1967, 1970, 1977, 1978
North Crawford	8	1968, 1969, 1972, 1975, 1976, 1977, 1978, 1979
Weston	6	1972, 1973, 1974, 1976, 1977, 1979
New Lisbon	3	1972, 1973, 1974
Brookwood	2	1964, 1965
De Soto	2	1977, 1978
Wonewoc-Center	2	1973, 1975
Cashton	1	1962
Royall	1	1971
Wauzeka	1	1974
Westby	1	1970
Bangor	0	
Elroy	0	
Ithaca	0	
Kendall	0	
Kickapoo	0	
La Farge	0	
Norwalk	0	
Ontario	0	
Seneca	0	
Wilton	0	

=== Football ===
School	Quantity	Years
Westby	15	1948, 1952, 1954, 1956, 1957, 1958, 1962, 1963, 1964, 1966, 1967, 1968, 1969, 1972, 1973
New Lisbon	5	1949, 1950, 1951, 1953, 1958
De Soto	4	1974, 1976, 1977, 1978
Royall	4	1959, 1960, 1965, 1971
Cashton	3	1961, 1977, 1978
Brookwood	2	1971, 1972
Hillsboro	2	1954, 1960
Kickapoo	2	1970, 1975
Weston	2	1975, 1976
Wonewoc-Center	2	1954, 1955
Ithaca	1	1973
La Farge	1	1974
Bangor	0	
Elroy	0	
Kendall	0	
Muscoda	0	
North Crawford	0	
Seneca	0	
Wauzeka	0	
