= Wisconsin River League =

Wisconsin high school athletic conference (1928-1960)

The Wisconsin River League is a former high school athletic conference with its membership roster in southwestern Wisconsin. Founded in 1928 and ended in 1960, its members belonged to the Wisconsin Interscholastic Athletic Association.

== History ==
Location of Wisconsin River League Members (1945–1955)

The Wisconsin River League was formed in 1928 by four small high schools near the Wisconsin River: Boscobel, Ithaca, Lone Rock and Muscoda. Original conference members were located in three counties of southwestern Wisconsin's Driftless Area (Grant, Iowa and Richland). Sextonville joined the league in 1929 to bring membership up to five schools. That number was increased to six when Blue River was accepted into the Wisconsin River League in 1930. Boscobel left the conference in 1934 and competed as an independent prior to joining the Southwest Wisconsin Athletic League in 1935. They were replaced by Avoca to keep the roster at six member schools. Lime Ridge's entry into the league in 1936 brought the membership tally to seven schools. An eighth school (Cazenovia) was added in 1938 to bring the league to its high water mark of eight members.

After the Wisconsin River League became an eight-member circuit, the closing and consolidation of rural high schools began to eat away at conference membership. Sextonville High School was closed in 1942, and its students were dispersed to other districts in Richland County. North Freedom joined the conference as their replacement, and their membership ran for three years before their district was folded and split between Baraboo and Reedsburg. In 1955, Cazenovia and Lime Ridge merged, with the new Weston High School taking the place of their predecessors.

The Wisconsin River League sponsored eight-player football for the first time in 1956 with five conference members (Blue River, Ithaca, Lone Rock, Muscoda and Weston) participating, along with associate members Kendall of the Monroe-Vernon Conference and La Farge the Kickapoo Valley League. Fellow KVL member Viola joined in 1957 to bring the football roster to eight schools. After football member Kendall consolidated with Elroy of the Scenic Central Conference, Gays Mills was brought over from the Kickapoo Valley League as their replacement for the 1959 season when they fielded their inaugural football squad. The conference continued with six active full members until it ceased operations after the 1960 football season. Five of the displaced schools (Blue River, Ithaca, Lone Rock, Muscoda and Weston) joined with four members formerly of the Iowa County League (Barneveld, Highland, Hollandale and Ridgeway) to form the I-W League. The sixth school (Avoca) was closed and its high school students were redistricted to Muscoda.

== Conference membership history ==
=== Final members ===
| School | Location | Affiliation | Mascot | Colors | Joined | Left | Conference Joined | Current Conference |
|---|---|---|---|---|---|---|---|---|
| Avoca | Avoca, WI | Public | Cardinals | | 1934 | 1960 | Independent | Closed in 1960 (consolidated into Muscoda) |
| Blue River | Blue River, WI | Public | Tigers | | 1930 | 1960 | I-W League | Closed in 1967 (consolidated into Riverdale) |
| Ithaca | Ithaca, WI | Public | Bulldogs | | 1928 | 1960 | I-W League | Ridge & Valley |
| Lone Rock | Lone Rock, WI | Public | Rockets | | 1928 | 1960 | I-W League | Closed in 1962 (merged into River Valley) |
| Muscoda | Muscoda, WI | Public | Indians | | 1928 | 1960 | I-W League | Closed in 1967 (merged into Riverdale) |
| Weston | Cazenovia, WI | Public | Silver Eagles | | 1955 | 1960 | I-W League | Ridge & Valley |

=== Previous members ===
| School | Location | Affiliation | Mascot | Colors | Joined | Left | Conference Joined | Current Conference |
|---|---|---|---|---|---|---|---|---|
| Boscobel | Boscobel, WI | Public | Bulldogs | | 1928 | 1934 | Independent | SWAL |
| Cazenovia | Cazenovia, WI | Public | Blue Devils | | 1938 | 1955 | Closed (merged into Weston) | |
| Lime Ridge | Lime Ridge, WI | Public | Red Raiders | | 1936 | 1955 | Closed (merged into Weston) | |
| North Freedom | North Freedom, WI | Public | Bulldogs | | 1942 | 1945 | Closed (split between Baraboo and Reedsburg) | |
| Sextonville | Sextonville, WI | Public | Tigers | | 1929 | 1942 | Closed (split between Ithaca, Lone Rock and Richland Center) | |

=== Football-only members ===
| School | Location | Affiliation | Mascot | Colors | Seasons | Primary Conference |
|---|---|---|---|---|---|---|
| Kendall | Kendall, WI | Public | Mustangs | | 1957-1958 | Monroe-Vernon |
| La Farge | La Farge, WI | Public | Wildcats | | 1956-1960 | Kickapoo Valley |
| Viola | Viola, WI | Public | Blue Jackets | | 1957-1960 | Kickapoo Valley |
| Gays Mills | Gays Mills, WI | Public | Tigers | | 1959-1960 | Kickapoo Valley |

== List of conference champions ==
=== Boys Basketball ===
| School | Quantity | Years |
|---|---|---|
| Muscoda | 16 | 1929, 1933, 1934, 1935, 1937, 1941, 1946, 1949, 1950, 1952, 1953, 1956, 1957, 1958, 1959, 1960 |
| Blue River | 6 | 1944, 1945, 1946, 1954, 1955, 1956 |
| Lone Rock | 5 | 1933, 1938, 1942, 1954, 1955 |
| Avoca | 4 | 1947, 1948, 1949, 1951 |
| Cazenovia | 2 | 1940, 1950 |
| Ithaca | 2 | 1930, 1933 |
| Sextonville | 2 | 1936, 1939 |
| North Freedom | 1 | 1943 |
| Boscobel | 0 | |
| Lime Ridge | 0 | |
| Weston | 0 | |
Champions from 1931-1932 unknown

=== Football ===
| School | Quantity | Years |
|---|---|---|
| Muscoda | 3 | 1956, 1958, 1959 |
| Kendall | 1 | 1958 |
| Lone Rock | 1 | 1957 |
| Weston | 1 | 1960 |
| Blue River | 0 | |
| Gays Mills | 0 | |
| Ithaca | 0 | |
| La Farge | | |
| Viola | 0 | |
