= Monroe-Vernon Conference =

Wisconsin high school athletic conference (1928-1958)

The Monroe-Vernon Conference is a former high school athletic conference in Wisconsin with its members concentrated in the southwestern part of the state. Operational from 1928-1958, all of its member schools belonged to the Wisconsin Interscholastic Athletic Association.

== History ==
Location of Original Monroe-Vernon Conference Members

The Monroe-Vernon Conference was formed in 1928 by six small high schools in Monroe and Vernon Counties in the Driftless Area of Wisconsin: Cashton, Kendall, Norwalk, Ontario, Westby and Wilton. The membership roster stayed remarkably stable during the conference's history, the only change occurred in 1941 when Westby, the largest school in the conference, left to join the new West Central Conference. The remaining five schools continued competition until 1958, when the schools in the Monroe-Vernon Conference merged with the five schools of the Juneau County League (Elroy, Hillsboro, New Lisbon, Westby and Wonewoc) to form the Scenic Central Conference and ensure future athletic competition for its members.

== Conference membership history ==
=== Final members ===
| School | Location | Affiliation | Mascot | Colors | Joined | Left | Conference Joined | Current Conference |
|---|---|---|---|---|---|---|---|---|
| Cashton | Cashton, WI | Public | Eagles | | 1928 | 1958 | Scenic Central | Scenic Bluffs |
| Kendall | Kendall, WI | Public | Mustangs | | 1928 | 1958 | Scenic Central | Closed in 1959 (merged into Royall) |
| Norwalk | Norwalk, WI | Public | Hawks | | 1928 | 1958 | Scenic Central | Closed in 1960 (merged into Brookwood) |
| Ontario | Ontario, WI | Public | Wildcats | | 1928 | 1958 | Scenic Central | Closed in 1960 (merged into Brookwood) |
| Wilton | Wilton, WI | Public | Warriors | | 1928 | 1958 | Scenic Central | Closed in 1963 (merged into Royall) |

=== Previous members ===
| School | Location | Affiliation | Mascot | Colors | Joined | Left | Conference Joined | Current Conference |
|---|---|---|---|---|---|---|---|---|
| Westby | Westby, WI | Public | Norsemen | | 1928 | 1941 | West Central | Coulee |

== List of conference champions ==
=== Boys Basketball ===
| School | Quantity | Years |
|---|---|---|
| Cashton | 11 | 1931, 1933, 1934, 1939, 1941, 1943, 1944, 1946, 1951, 1953, 1958 |
| Norwalk | 9 | 1929, 1932, 1936, 1937, 1942, 1943, 1944, 1947, 1948 |
| Wilton | 6 | 1935, 1945, 1954, 1955, 1956, 1957 |
| Kendall | 3 | 1930, 1952, 1958 |
| Ontario | 3 | 1948, 1949, 1950 |
| Westby | 3 | 1938, 1940, 1941 |
