= Vacationland Conference =

Wisconsin high school athletic conference (1966-1970)

The Vacationland Conference is a former high school athletic conference with its membership roster concentrated in south central Wisconsin. A relatively short-lived conference, the Vacationland was founded in 1966 and disbanded in 1970, and all members were part of the Wisconsin Interscholastic Athletic Association.

== History ==
Location of Vacationland Conference Members

The Vacationland Conference was originally formed in 1966 by a group of five small high schools in south central Wisconsin: Adams-Friendship, New Lisbon, Royall, Tri-County and Westfield. Three of the conference's charter members were formerly in the Central-C Conference (Adams-Friendship, Tri-County and Westfield) and two came from the Scenic Central Conference (New Lisbon and Royall). Nekoosa and Wautoma later joined from the South Central and Central Wisconsin Conferences, respectively. Efforts to find an eighth member ended in vain, and the Vacationland Conference began the 1966-67 school year with seven schools. They formed a stable membership roster during the conference's run, but ultimately it would be brief as the Vacationland Conference was realigned out of existence in 1970. New Lisbon and Royall rejoined the Scenic Central Conference, and four schools were dispersed to other conferences. Nekoosa joined the Marawood Conference, Tri-County became a charter member of the Central State Conference, Wautoma reentered the Central Wisconsin Conference and Westfield went to the Dual County Conference. Adams-Friendship was left without a conference for the 1970-71 school year but was invited to join the South Central Conference in 1971.

== Conference membership history ==
School	Location	Affiliation	Mascot	Colors	Joined	Left	Conference Joined	Current Conference
Adams-Friendship	Adams, WI	Public	Green Devils		1966	1970	Independent	South Central
Nekoosa	Nekoosa, WI	Public	Papermakers		1966	1970	Marawood	South Central
New Lisbon	New Lisbon, WI	Public	Rockets		1966	1970	Scenic Central	Scenic Bluffs
Royall	Elroy, WI	Public	Panthers		1966	1970	Scenic Central	Scenic Bluffs
Tri-County	Plainfield, WI	Public	Penguins		1966	1970	Central State	Central Wisconsin
Wautoma	Wautoma, WI	Public	Hornets		1966	1970	Central Wisconsin	South Central
Westfield	Westfield, WI	Public	Pioneers		1966	1970	Dual County	South Central

== List of conference champions ==
=== Boys Basketball ===
School	Quantity	Years
Royall	2	1967, 1970
Nekoosa	1	1969
Wautoma	1	1968
Adams-Friendship	0	
New Lisbon	0	
Tri-County	0	
Westfield	0	

=== Football ===
School	Quantity	Years
Royall	2	1966, 1969
Westfield	2	1967, 1968
Nekoosa	1	1968
Adams-Friendship	0	
New Lisbon	0	
Tri-County	0	
Wautoma	0	
