= Juneau County League =

Wisconsin high school athletics (1926–1958)

The Juneau County League is a former high school athletic conference in Wisconsin. Formed in 1926 and disbanded in 1958, all of its member schools were affiliated with the Wisconsin Interscholastic Athletic Association.

== History ==
Location of Original Juneau County League Members

The Juneau County League was founded in 1926 by six small high schools on the eastern edge of the Driftless Area in central Wisconsin: Elroy, Hillsboro, Mauston, Necedah, New Lisbon and Wonewoc. All members were located in Juneau County with the exception of Hillsboro in neighboring Vernon County. Necedah left the conference after one season to be replaced by Camp Douglas High School in 1927. The Juneau County League continued on with six members until Necedah returned to the conference and Wisconsin Dells joined in 1932, bringing the membership roster to a high of eight schools. Wisconsin Dells would leave the conference to join the South Central Conference as a provisionary member in 1939 and were followed out two years later by Mauston, who joined the West Central Conference. The six remaining schools would carry on until Westby joined the loop after the demise of the West Central Conference in 1952. By the mid-1950s, rural school district consolidation and defections began to take their toll on conference membership. Camp Douglas High School was the first to go, as it closed in 1955 after their school district was folded into neighboring Tomah. Necedah left the next year for membership in the Central Lakes Conference, and by 1956, there were only five schools left in the conference. The end came for the Juneau County League came in 1958, when the five remaining members merged with the five-school Monroe-Vernon Conference (Cashton, Kendall, Norwalk, Ontario and Wilton) to form the new Scenic Central Conference.

== Conference membership history ==
=== Final members ===
School	Location	Affiliation	Mascot	Colors	Joined	Left	Conference Joined	Current Conference
Elroy	Elroy, WI	Public	Hilltoppers		1926	1958	Scenic Central	Closed in 1959 (merged into Royall)
Hillsboro	Hillsboro, WI	Public	Tigers		1926	1958	Scenic Central	Scenic Bluffs
New Lisbon	New Lisbon, WI	Public	Rockets		1926	1958	Scenic Central	Scenic Bluffs
Westby	Westby, WI	Public	Norsemen		1952	1958	Scenic Central	Coulee
Wonewoc	Wonewoc, WI	Public	Indians		1926	1958	Scenic Central	Scenic Bluffs

=== Previous members ===
School	Location	Affiliation	Mascot	Colors	Joined	Left	Conference Joined	Current Conference
Camp Douglas	Camp Douglas, WI	Public	Generals		1927	1955	Closed (merged into Tomah)	
Mauston	Mauston, WI	Public	Golden Eagles		1926	1941	West Central	South Central
Necedah	Necedah, WI	Public	Cardinals		1926, 1932	1927, 1956	Independent, Central Lakes	Scenic Bluffs
Wisconsin Dells	Wisconsin Dells, WI	Public	Chiefs		1932	1939	South Central	

== List of conference champions ==
=== Boys Basketball ===
School	Quantity	Years
New Lisbon	19	1929, 1931, 1932, 1934, 1935, 1937, 1938, 1939, 1940, 1941, 1942, 1944, 1945, 1946, 1952, 1953, 1954, 1956, 1957
Hillsboro	5	1942, 1943, 1948, 1950, 1955
Wonewoc	4	1928, 1944, 1947, 1951
Elroy	3	1927, 1950, 1958
Camp Douglas	2	1931, 1933
Mauston	2	1930, 1932
Necedah	2	1939, 1949
Wisconsin Dells	1	1936
Westby	0	
