= Ridge & Valley Conference =

Wisconsin high school athletic conference

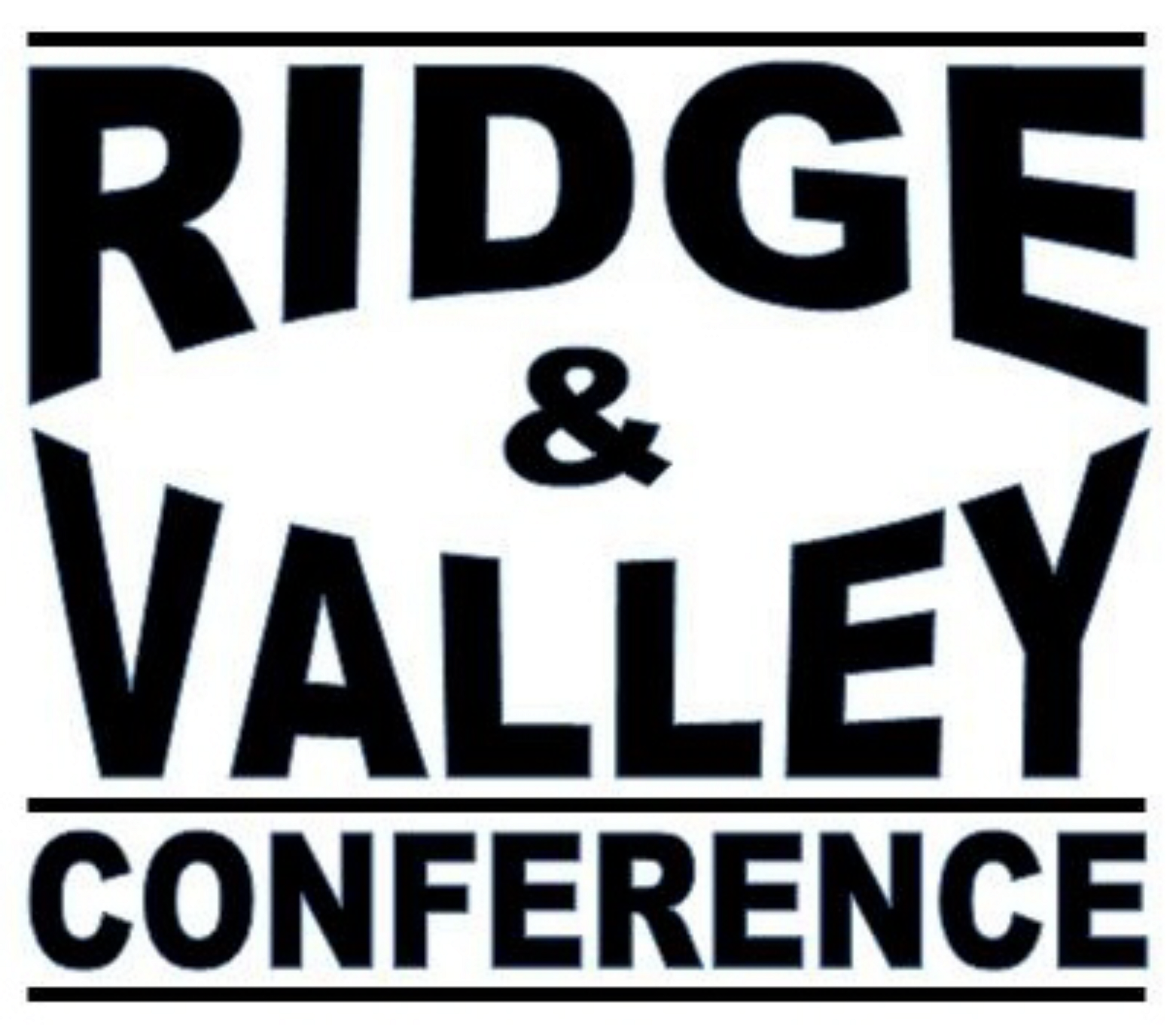

The Ridge & Valley Conference is a high school athletic conference in Wisconsin. Founded in 1979, its members are small schools concentrated in the southern part of the state's Driftless Area. All conference members belong to the Wisconsin Interscholastic Athletic Association.

== History ==
The Ridge & Valley Conference was formed in 1979 when the larger Scenic Central Conference split into two smaller conferences from its existing Northern and Southern divisions. All seven schools in the Southern Division (De Soto, Ithaca, Kickapoo, La Farge, North Crawford, Seneca and Wauzeka-Steuben) plus Weston from the Northern Division formed the Ridge & Valley Conference's membership roster. Membership has not experienced any changes over the history of the conference among full members.

=== Football ===
==== 1979-2020 ====
The Ridge & Valley Conference began football sponsorship along with all other sports after its split from the Scenic Central Conference in 1979, with all members participating. After winning the first three R&V football titles, De Soto was moved to the Scenic Bluffs Conference in 1982, swapping affiliations with the newly reinstated football program at Brookwood. This arrangement was reversed for the 2001 season, with De Soto returning to the conference and Brookwood moving back to the Scenic Bluffs. By this time, some of the conference members started to consolidate their programs due to lack of available players. The first two schools to do so were Kickapoo and La Farge, who combined their programs beginning with the 2004 season. In 2016, Seneca and Wauzeka-Steuben merged their football teams, along with Weston and Scenic Bluffs members Wonewoc-Center. Riverdale's entry into the Ridge & Valley from the Southwest Wisconsin Activities League kept its football roster at seven schools. The 2019 season saw an eighth school, Highland of the Six Rivers Conference, join as associate members in football.

==== 2020-present ====
In February 2019, the WIAA and the Wisconsin Football Coaches Association released a comprehensive realignment for Wisconsin's high school football conferences, set to begin with the 2020 football season and run on a two-year cycle. Three programs (Kickapoo/La Farge, North Crawford and Wonewoc-Center/Weston) made the switch to eight-player football for the 2020 season, and were replaced by Boscobel of the SWAL and Hillsboro of the Scenic Bluffs. For the 2022-2023 competition cycle, De Soto made the switch to eight-player football with Iowa-Grant moving over from the SWAL as their replacement. in 2024, the Ridge & Valley Conference made the decision to move to eight-player football, welcoming four former members back into the conference (De Soto, Kickapoo/La Farge, North Crawford and Wonewoc-Center/Weston) along with newcomers Belmont, Monticello and Wisconsin Heights joining Highland (the only holdover from 2023) to form its initial roster. In 2026, Wonewoc-Center and Weston are planning to dissolve their cooperative agreement for football, and Weston will partner with Ithaca's eleven-player program. Wonewoc-Center is currently slated to continue as an eight-player program exclusive to that school.

== List of member schools ==
=== Current members ===
School	Location	Affiliation	Enrollment	Mascot	Colors	Joined
De Soto	De Soto, WI	Public	133	Pirates		1979
Ithaca	Ithaca, WI	Public	101	Bulldogs		1979
Kickapoo	Viola, WI	Public	156	Panthers		1979
La Farge	La Farge. WI	Public	63	Wildcats		1979
North Crawford	Soldiers Grove, WI	Public	107	Trojans		1979
Seneca	Seneca, WI	Public	77	Royals		1979
Wauzeka-Steuben	Wauzeka, WI	Public	76	Hornets		1979
Weston	Cazenovia, WI	Public	80	Silver Eagles		1979

=== Current associate members ===
School	Location	Affiliation	Mascot	Colors	Primary Conference	Sport(s)
Belmont	Belmont, WI	Public	Braves		Six Rivers	Football (8-player)
Cassville	Cassville, WI	Public	Comets		Six Rivers	Boys Cross Country, Girls Cross Country
Highland	Highland, WI	Public	Cardinals		Six Rivers	Football (8-player)
Monticello	Monticello, WI	Public	Ponies		Six Rivers	Football (8-player)
River Ridge	Patch Grove, WI	Public	Timberwolves		Six Rivers	Boys Cross Country, Girls Cross Country
Shullsburg	Shullsburg, WI	Public	Miners		Six Rivers	Boys Cross Country, (Note: Co-operative with Belmont) Girls Cross Country
Wisconsin Heights	Mazomanie, WI	Public	Vanguards		Capitol	Football (8-player)
Wonewoc-Center	Wonewoc, WI	Public	Wolves		Scenic Bluffs	Football (8-player)

=== Former football-only members ===
School	Location	Affiliation	Mascot	Colors	Seasons	Primary Conference
Boscobel	Boscobel, WI	Public	Bulldogs		2020-2023	SWAL
Brookwood	Ontario, WI	Public	Falcons		1982-2000	Scenic Bluffs
Hillsboro	Hillsboro, WI	Public	Tigers		2020-2023	Scenic Bluffs
Iowa-Grant	Livingston, WI	Public	Panthers		2022-2023	SWAL
Riverdale	Muscoda, WI	Public	Chieftains		2016-2023	SWAL

== Membership map ==
Ridge & Valley Conference
Location of Ridge & Valley Conference full members:
1 De Soto
2 Ithaca
3 Kickapoo
4 La Farge
5 North Crawford
6 Seneca
7 Wauzeka-Steuben
8 Weston

== Sponsored sports ==
	Baseball	Boys Basketball	Girls Basketball	Boys Cross Country	Girls Cross Country	Football (8-player)	Softball	Boys Track & Field	Girls Track & Field	Girls Volleyball	Boys Wrestling (Note: Co-sponsored with the Scenic Bluffs Conference and Six Rivers Conference)	Girls Wrestling
De Soto	●	●	●	●	●	●	●	●	●	●	●	●
Ithaca	●	●					● (Note: Co-operative with Weston)	●	●	●	●	●
Kickapoo	●	●	●	● (Note: Co-operative with La Farge)	●	●	●	●	●	●	● (Note: Co-operative with La Farge and Youth Initiative)	●
La Farge	●	●	● (Note: Co-operative with Youth Initiative)				●			●		
North Crawford	●	●	●	●	●	●	●	●	●	●	● (Note: Co-operative with Seneca)	●
Seneca	●	●	●	●	●		●	●	●	●		
Wauzeka-Steuben	●	●	●	●	●		●	●	●	●		
Weston	●	●	● (Note: Co-operative with Ithaca)	●	●					●		

== List of state champions ==
=== Fall sports ===
None

=== Winter sports ===
None

=== Spring sports ===
Baseball
School	Year	Division
De Soto	2000	Division 3
De Soto	2001	Division 3
Ithaca	2016	Division 4
Ithaca	2023	Division 4

Softball
School	Year	Division
Seneca	1983	Class C
Seneca	2000	Division 3

Girls Track & Field
School	Year	Division
North Crawford	1991	Division 3
North Crawford	1992	Division 3

== List of conference champions ==
=== Boys Basketball ===
School	Quantity	Years
North Crawford	18	1980, 1981, 1983, 1985, 1986, 1987, 1998, 1999, 2000, 2004, 2005, 2006, 2009, 2010, 2012, 2013, 2024, 2025
Seneca	11	2001, 2002, 2003, 2007, 2008, 2011, 2015, 2016, 2017, 2018, 2023
Kickapoo	7	1992, 1993, 1994, 1995, 1996, 1997, 2026
Wauzeka-Steuben	7	1987, 1991, 2005, 2019, 2020, 2021, 2022
Weston	4	1982, 1984, 1988, 1990
La Farge	2	1989, 2014
Ithaca	1	2024
De Soto	0	

=== Girls Basketball ===
School	Quantity	Years
Ithaca	14	1981, 1982, 1983, 1984, 1985, 1986, 1990, 1998, 1999, 2000, 2001, 2007, 2013, 2014
Seneca	13	1980, 1981, 1983, 1987, 1988, 1989, 2010, 2011, 2012, 2013, 2016, 2017, 2018
Kickapoo	11	1988, 2002, 2003, 2004, 2005, 2016, 2019, 2020, 2022, 2023, 2025
Wauzeka-Steuben	7	2015, 2019, 2020, 2021, 2022, 2024, 2025
Weston	7	1991, 1992, 1993, 1994, 1997, 2008, 2009
North Crawford	4	1995, 1996, 1997, 1998
De Soto	2	2006, 2026
La Farge	0	

=== Football ===
School	Quantity	Years
Ithaca	15	1985, 1986, 1992, 1996, 1998, 1999, 2001, 2002, 2008, 2010, 2012, 2014, 2015, 2016, 2019
De Soto	10	1979, 1980, 1981, 2002, 2003, 2006, 2008, 2009, 2011, 2013
Seneca	9	1983, 1990, 1991, 1993, 1994, 2000, 2002, 2007, 2010
North Crawford	8	1982, 1983, 1984, 1997, 2004, 2005, 2013, 2025
Highland	4	2020, 2021, 2023, 2024
Kickapoo	4	1983, 1984, 1988, 1989
Seneca/ Wauzeka-Steuben	4	2017, 2018, 2019, 2022
Weston	4	1982, 1985, 1993, 1995
Kickapoo/ La Farge	2	2008, 2012
Belmont	1	2026
Brookwood	1	1987
Boscobel	0	
Hillsboro	0	
Iowa-Grant	0	
La Farge	0	
Monticello	0	
Riverdale	0	
Wauzeka-Steuben	0	
Wisconsin Heights	0	
Wonewoc-Center/ Weston	0	
Wonewoc-Center	0	
