= Kickapoo Valley League =

Wisconsin high school athletic conference (1907-1971)

The Kickapoo Valley League is a former high school athletic conference in Wisconsin, competing from 1907 to 1971. Membership was concentrated in the Driftless Area of the state, and all members belonged to the Wisconsin Interscholastic Athletic Association.

== History ==
=== 1907–1953 ===
Location of Original Kickapoo Valley League Members

The Kickapoo Valley League was formed in 1907 as an oratorical and track and field league by four small high schools in Crawford County and Vernon County in southwestern Wisconsin: La Farge, Seneca, Soldiers Grove and Viola. The original members were all located along the Kickapoo River, a tributary of the Wisconsin River that the conference derives its name from. Membership experienced some minor changes in the early years, but the original group remained together for nearly a decade. Wauzeka joined in 1916 and Gays Mills joined in 1923 to bring membership to six schools. These six schools would participate in the conference's first season of basketball sponsorship in 1928. In 1931, West Lima joined the Kickapoo Valley League, replacing the exiting Seneca. They would rejoin the league along with newcomers Readstown in 1934. This eight member group maintained stability into the early 1950s, when De Soto High School (who had opened the year before) joined the conference in 1953 as its ninth member.

=== 1953–1971 ===
Location of Kickapoo Valley League Members (1953-1964)
Location of Final Kickapoo Valley League Members

The Kickapoo Valley League maintained a steady roster for the next decade, sponsoring eight-player football for the first time in 1963 with six participating members (Gays Mills, La Farge, Seneca, Soldiers Grove, Viola and Wauzeka). By the mid-1960s, conference membership began to change due to rural school district consolidation. The first of these changes occurred in 1964, when conference members Readstown, Viola and West Lima merged to form Kickapoo High School. The new school played for one more year in the league before joining the Scenic Central Conference in 1965. Blue River and Ithaca joined the conference after being displaced by the dissolution of the I-W League 1964 to replace the schools that were lost. In 1965, Gays Mills and Soldiers Grove combined to create the new North Crawford High School. They inherited the two predecessor schools' place in the league and were joined by two more schools left without conference affiliation after the I-W League's closing: Barneveld and Hollandale. North Crawford's stay in the Kickapoo Valley League would be brief, as they and De Soto left in 1966 to join the Scenic Central Conference. Blue River High School was lost to consolidation in 1967 when they joined with the Riverdale School District. That same year, the Kickapoo Valley League transitioned to eleven-player football along with several other leagues in southern Wisconsin. La Farge's exit from the Kickapoo Valley League to join the Scenic Central Conference in 1968 left the loop with just five schools. The Kickapoo Valley League lost Hollandale to consolidation with Blanchardville in 1971, and the new Pecatonica High School inherited Blanchardville's State Line League membership. The remaining four schools dissolved the conference that same year, with Barneveld joining the State Line League and the other three schools (Ithaca, Seneca and Wauzeka) taking up residence in the Scenic Central Conference.

== Conference membership history ==
=== Final members ===
School	Location	Affiliation	Mascot	Colors	Joined	Left	Conference Joined	Current Conference
Barneveld	Barneveld, WI	Public	Golden Eagles		1965	1971	State Line	Six Rivers
Hollandale	Hollandale, WI	Public	Panthers		1965	1971	Closed (merged into Pecatonica)	
Ithaca	Ithaca, WI	Public	Bulldogs		1964	1971	Scenic Central	Ridge & Valley
Seneca	Seneca, WI	Public	Indians		1907, 1914, 1934	1912, 1931, 1971	Independent, Scenic Central	Ridge & Valley
Wauzeka	Wauzeka, WI	Public	Hornets		1916	1971	Scenic Central	Ridge & Valley

=== Previous members ===
School	Location	Affiliation	Mascot	Colors	Joined	Left	Conference Joined	Current Conference
Blue River	Blue River, WI	Public	Tigers		1964	1967	Closed (merged into Riverdale)	
De Soto	De Soto, WI	Public	Pirates		1953	1966	Scenic Central	Ridge & Valley
Gays Mills	Gays Mills, WI	Public	Tigers		1923	1965	Closed (merged into North Crawford)	
Kickapoo	Viola, WI	Public	Panthers		1964	1965	Scenic Central	Ridge & Valley
La Farge	La Farge, WI	Public	Wildcats		1907	1968	Scenic Central	Ridge & Valley
North Crawford	Soldiers Grove, WI	Public	Trojans		1965	1966	Scenic Central	Ridge & Valley
Ontario	Ontario, WI	Public	Wildcats		1912	1913	Independent	Closed (merged into Brookwood)
Readstown	Readstown, WI	Public	Eagles		1934	1964	Closed (merged into Kickapoo)	
Soldiers Grove	Soldiers Grove, WI	Public	Cardinals		1907	1965	Closed (merged into North Crawford)	
Viola	Viola, WI	Public	Blue Jackets		1907	1964	Closed (merged into Kickapoo)	
West Lima	West Lima, WI	Public	Bulldogs		1931	1964	Closed (merged into Kickapoo)	

== List of state champions ==
=== Fall sports ===
None

=== Winter sports ===
None

=== Spring sports ===
Boys Track & Field
School	Year	Division
Wauzeka	1927	Single Division
Viola	1932	Class C
Viola	1935	Class C
Viola	1936	Class C
Soldiers Grove	1940	Class C
Soldiers Grove	1941	Class C

== List of conference champions ==
=== Boys Basketball ===
School	Quantity	Years
Soldiers Grove	13	1930, 1936, 1937, 1938, 1939, 1940, 1941, 1942, 1945, 1946, 1954, 1960, 1963
Gays Mills	11	1929, 1943, 1944, 1947, 1948, 1953, 1957, 1958, 1959, 1961, 1962
La Farge	6	1931, 1950, 1951, 1952, 1954, 1956
Seneca	6	1957, 1958, 1961, 1964, 1966, 1967
Wauzeka	5	1934, 1935, 1936, 1955, 1969
Barneveld	2	1968, 1970
Viola	2	1932, 1933
West Lima	2	1941, 1949
Ithaca	1	1971
Kickapoo	1	1965
Readstown	1	1958
Blue River	0	
De Soto	0	
Hollandale	0	
North Crawford	0	

=== Football ===
School	Quantity	Years
Ithaca	3	1965, 1969, 1970
Barneveld	2	1966, 1967
Kickapoo	1	1964
Seneca	1	1963
Wauzeka	1	1968
Blue River	0	
Gays Mills	0	
Hollandale	0	
La Farge	0	
North Crawford	0	
Soldiers Grove	0	
Viola	0	
