= Cashton Middle/High School =

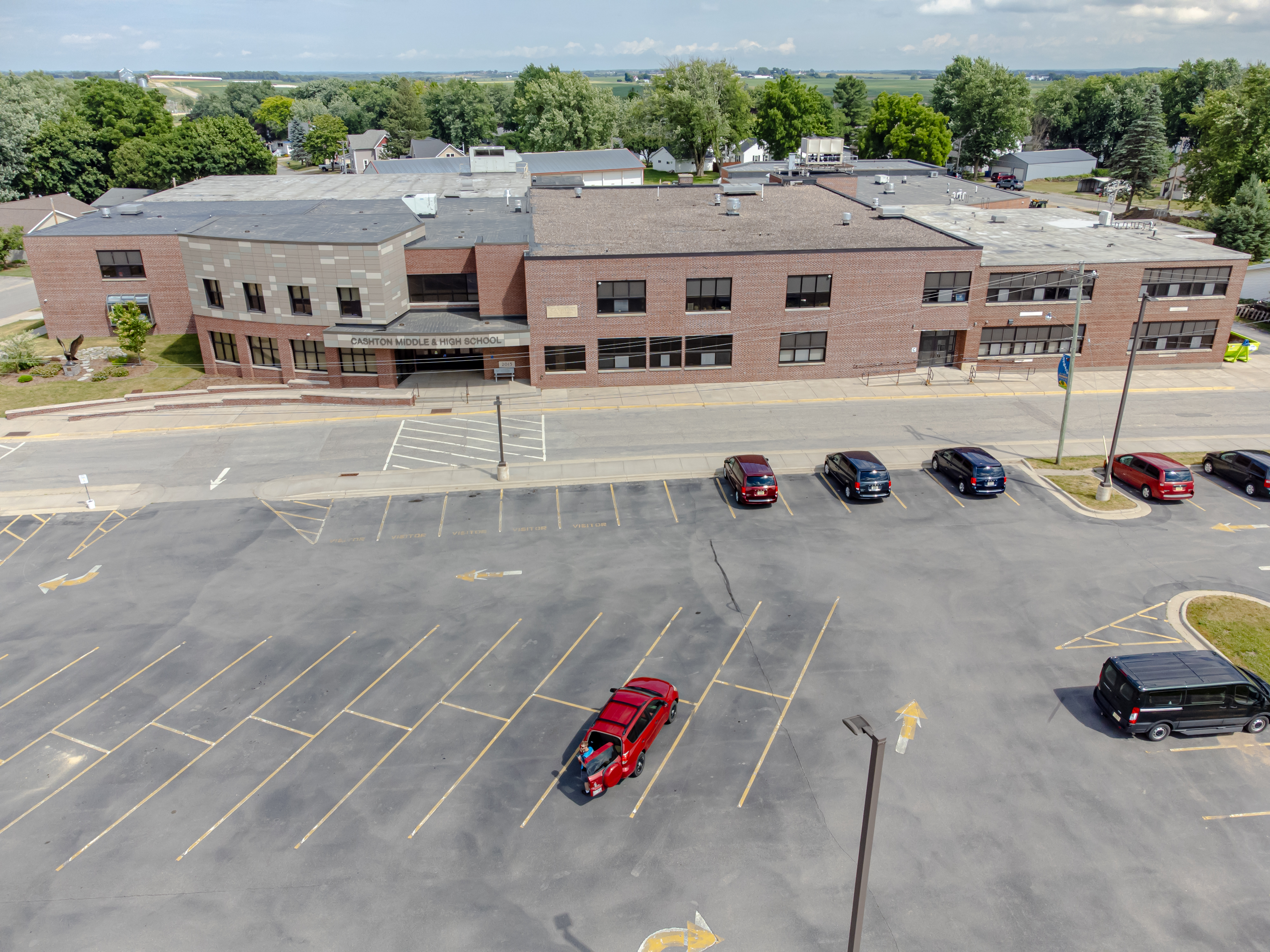

Location
- 540 Coe St; Cashton, Wisconsin; United States
- Coordinates: 43.7406°N 90.7798°W

Information
- Type: Public Secondary
- School district: Cashton School District
- Principal: Jennifer Butzler
- Teaching staff: 28.68 (FTE)
- Grades: 6–12
- Enrollment: 327 (2023-2024)
  - Grade 6: 49
  - Grade 7: 44
  - Grade 8: 42
  - Grade 9: 47
  - Grade 10: 45
  - Grade 11: 50
  - Grade 12: 50
- Student to teacher ratio: 11.40
- Colors: Maroon and White
- Website: http://www.cashton.k12.wi.us/

Cashton Middle/High School is a public high school located in Cashton, Wisconsin. It is the only high school in the Cashton School District.

== Extracurricular activities ==
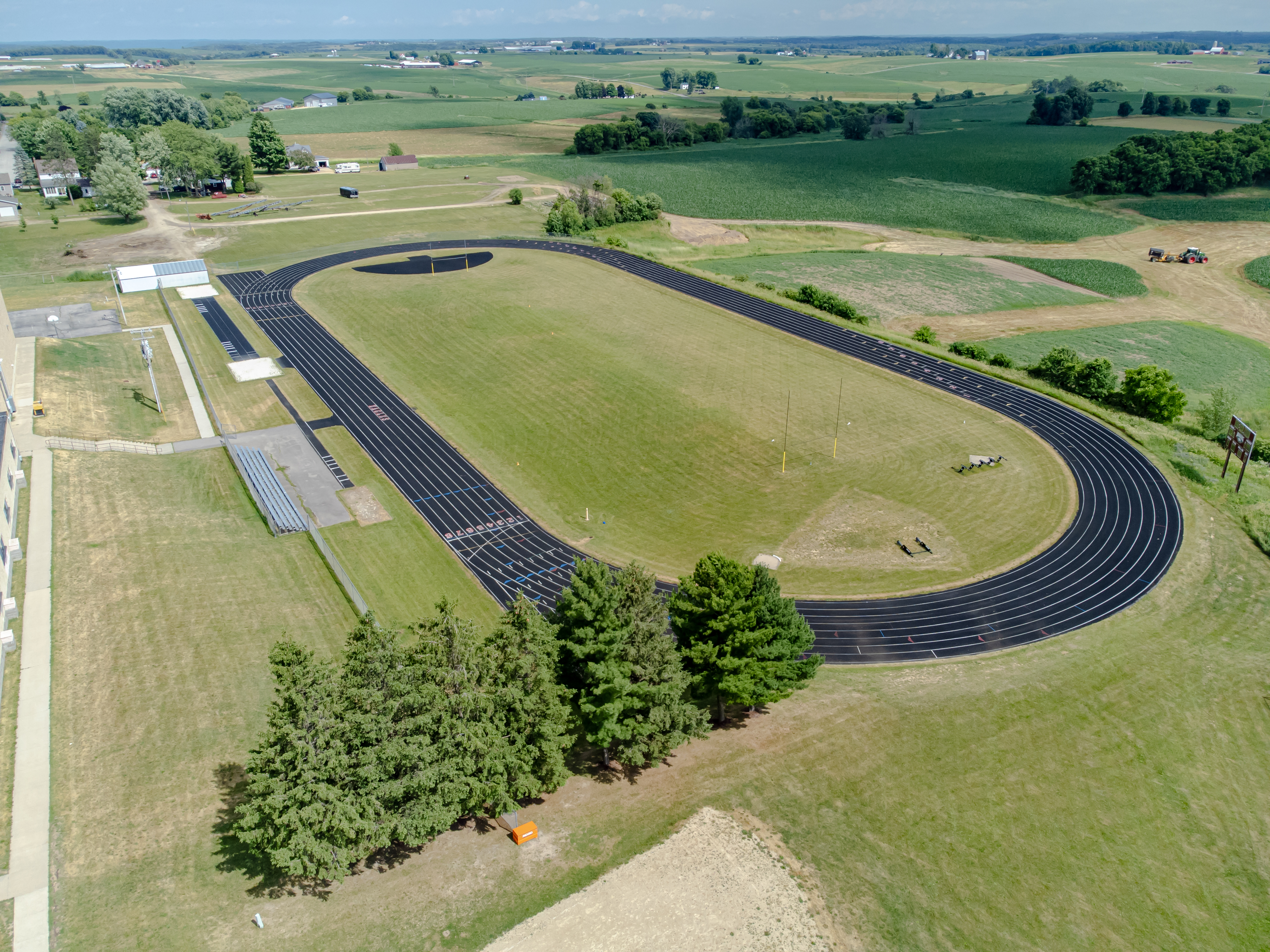
Cashton track

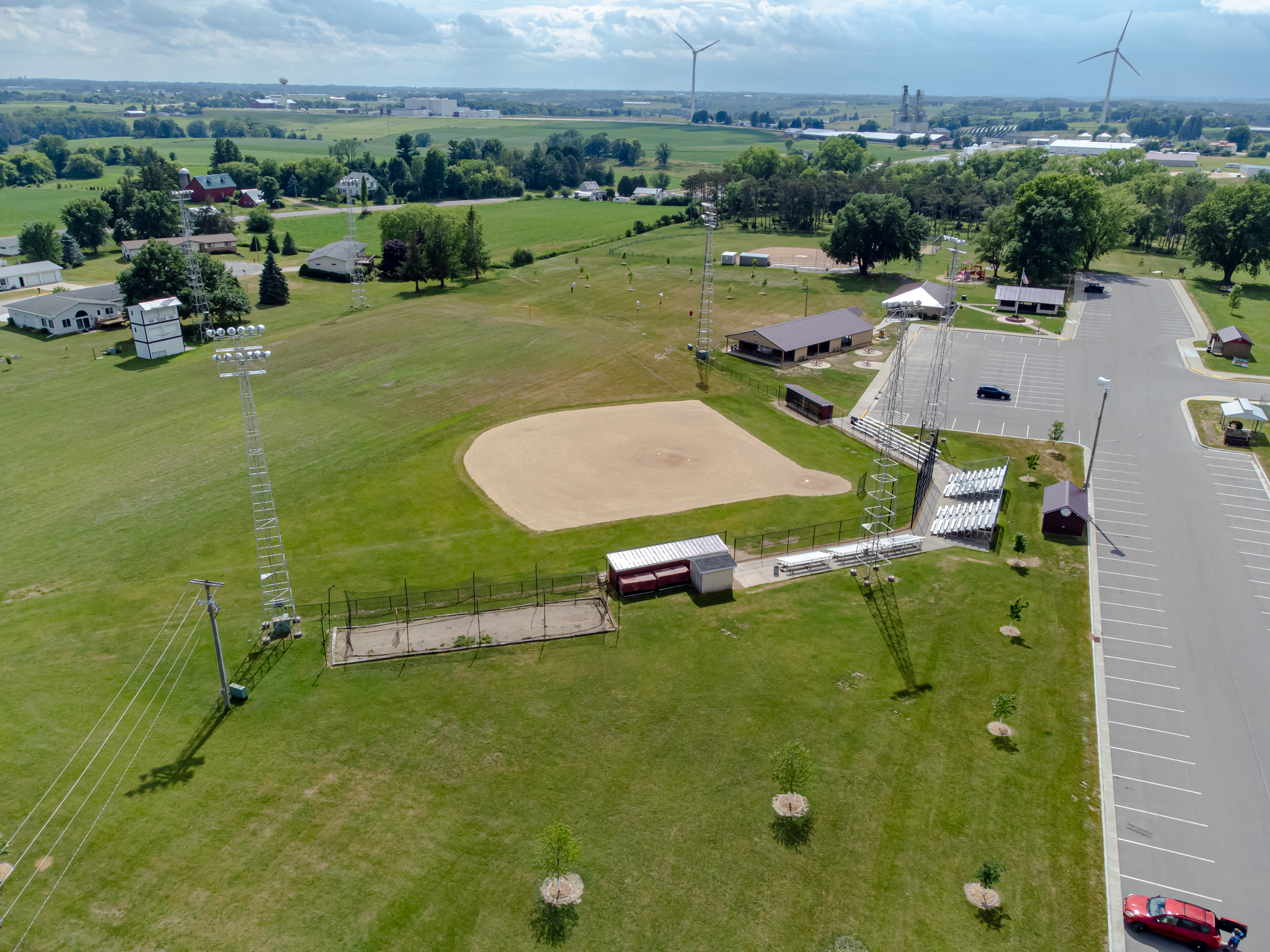
Cashton baseball/football field

=== Athletics ===
- Boys' and girls' basketball
- Football
- Cross country
- Track and field
- Boys' and girls' hockey
- Volleyball
- Gymnastics
- Cheerleading
- Wrestling
- Baseball
- Softball

Cashton has rivalries with both Bangor and New Lisbon.

==== Athletic conference affiliation history ====
- Monroe-Vernon Conference (1928-1958)
- Scenic Central Conference (1958-1979)
- Scenic Bluffs Conference (1979–present)

=== Clubs ===
Student organizations include marching band, FBLA, FFA, and art club.
