= Kickapoo High School (Viola, Wisconsin) =

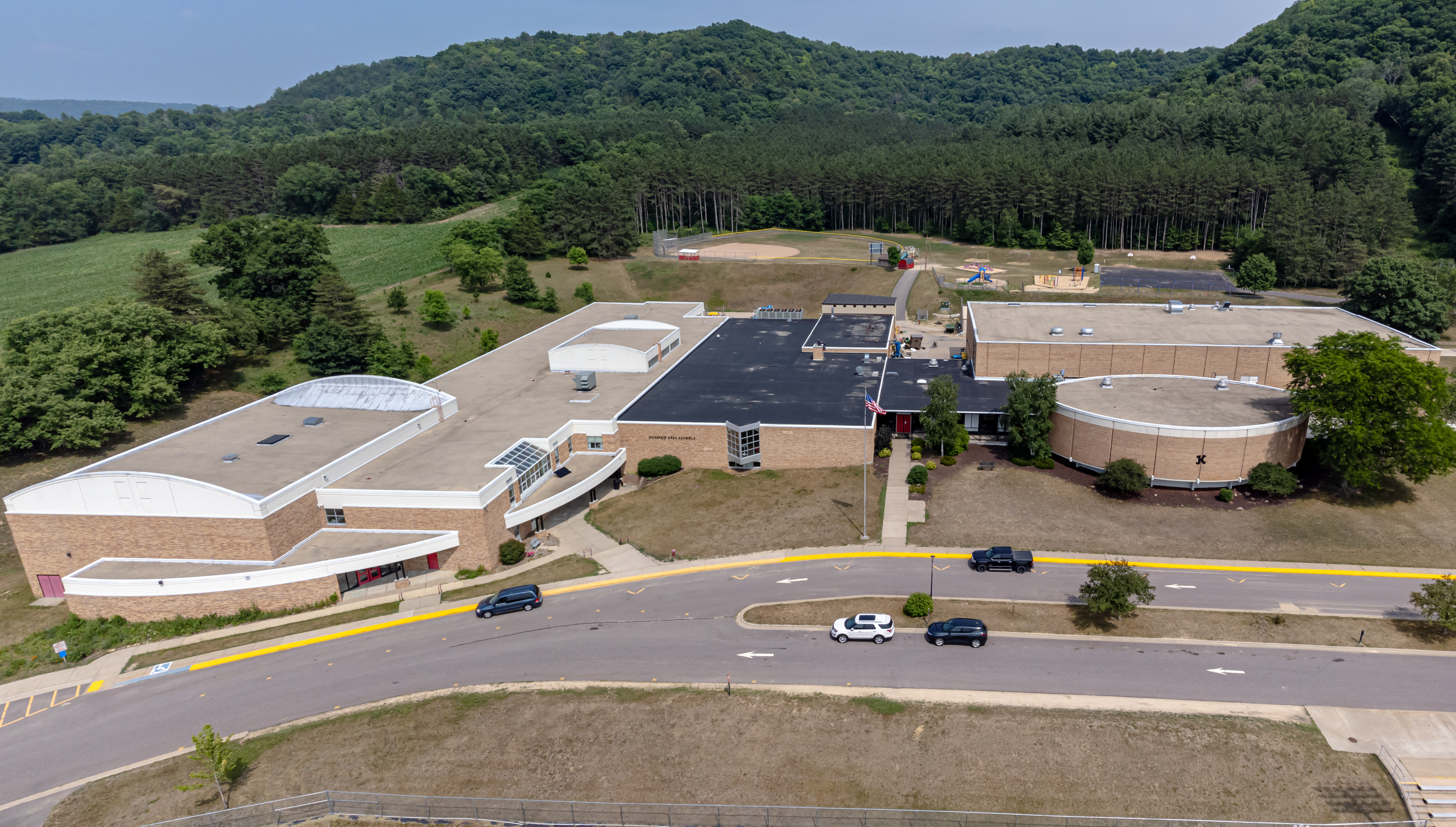

Location
- 6520 South State Highway 131; Viola, Wisconsin 54664; United States; 43°29′39″N 90°40′40″W

Information
- Type: Public
- School district: Kickapoo Area School District
- Principal: Aaron Mitum
- Teaching staff: 20.45 (FTE)
- Grades: 6-12
- Enrollment: 258 (2023-2024)
- Student to teacher ratio: 12.62
- Colors: Red, black, and white
- Mascot: Panther
- Website: www.kickapoo.k12.wi.us

Kickapoo High School is a high school and middle school located in Viola, Wisconsin, United States. Part of the Kickapoo Area School District, it serves grades 6–12. Enrollment is 268. The student to teacher ratio is 14:1 (as of the 2015–2016 school year). In 2007, Kickapoo High School was awarded the U.S. News Silver Star Award; it was one of three Wisconsin high schools to receive this honor.

== Extracurricular activities ==
=== Music ===
In 2009, the Kickapoo High School Music Department was awarded $10,000 by the Mr. Holland's Opus Foundation for excellence in the music education program. The award is given to 50 poverty-level schools yearly, out of the 2000 that apply.

=== Athletics ===
Kickapoo High School is a member of the Ridge & Valley Conference. Its athletic teams are known as the Panthers. The school's football team reached the Wisconsin Interscholastic Athletic Association Division 6 state title game in 1989, though it lost to Augusta High School.

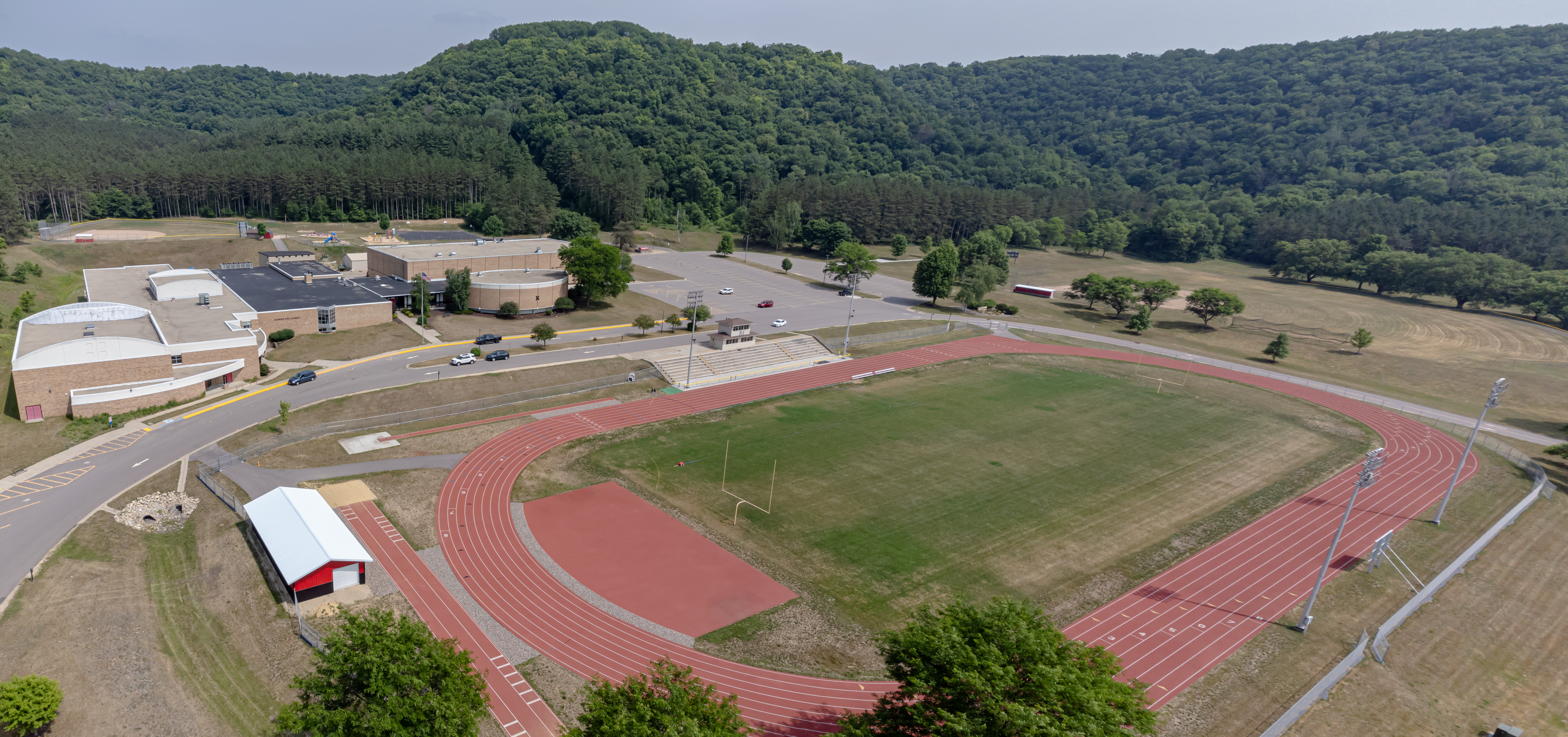

==== Athletic conference affiliation history ====
- Kicakpoo Valley League (1964-1965)
- Scenic Central Conference (1965-1979)
- Ridge & Valley Conference (1979–present)

== See also ==
- Kickapoo, Wisconsin
