= Gateway-West Central Conference =

Wisconsin high school athletic conference (1941-1952)

The Gateway-West Central Conference is an affiliated pair of former high school athletic conferences with their membership concentrated in west central Wisconsin. Competing from 1941 to 1952, all member schools belonged to the Wisconsin Interscholastic Athletic Association.

== History ==
Location of Gateway Conference Members
Location of West Central Conference Members

The Gateway-West Central Conference was founded in 1941, resulting from a split of the nine-member South Central Conference. Logan High School in La Crosse was not only the largest high school in the conference, it was the most dominant with perennial contenders in multiple sports. Coupled with being a geographic outlier in west central Wisconsin, the smaller schools to the east (Baraboo, Portage, Reedsburg, Richland Center and Wisconsin Dells) voted to remove Logan from the conference in 1941. The three closest schools geographically to Logan (Sparta, Tomah and Viroqua) voted with Logan to keep them in the conference, but were outnumbered by a 5-4 margin and formed the Gateway Conference. Another conference under the same organizational structure was formed by three members of the Gateway (Sparta, Tomah and Viroqua), along with Mauston of the Juneau County League and Westby of the Monroe-Vernon Conference which was called the West Central Conference.

The two conferences were affiliated but competed for two different championships, and all games played between the three dual members counted in the standings for both leagues. This arrangement lasted until 1947, when the Gateway Conference was dissolved and three of its members (Logan, Sparta and Tomah) joined with Chippewa Falls to form the North Central Conference under the same organizational structure. Westby also left the West Central Conference as football members to join the new Scenic Central Conference that year. Two years later, this alignment was scrapped in favor of a return to the original Gateway Conference lineup for the 1949-50 school year. The Gateway and West Central Conferences continued competition for three more years before both were disbanded in 1952.

== Conference membership history ==
=== Gateway/North Central Conference ===
| School | Location | Affiliation | Nickname | Colors | Joined | Left | Conference Joined | Current Conference |
|---|---|---|---|---|---|---|---|---|
| La Crosse Logan | La Crosse, WI | Public | Rangers | | 1941 | 1952 | Independent | Mississippi Valley |
| Sparta | Sparta, WI | Public | Spartans | | 1941 | 1952 | South Central | Mississippi Valley |
| Tomah | Tomah, WI | Public | Indians | | 1941 | 1952 | South Central | Mississippi Valley |
| Viroqua | Viroqua, WI | Public | Blackhawks | | 1941, 1949 | 1947, 1952 | South Central | Coulee |
| Chippewa Falls | Chippewa Falls, WI | Public | Cardinals | | 1947 | 1949 | Independent | Big Rivers |

=== West Central Conference ===
| School | Location | Affiliation | Nickname | Colors | Joined | Left | Conference Joined | Current Conference |
|---|---|---|---|---|---|---|---|---|
| Mauston | Mauston, WI | Public | Golden Eagles | | 1941 | 1952 | South Central | |
| Sparta | Sparta, WI | Public | Spartans | | 1941 | 1952 | South Central | Mississippi Valley |
| Tomah | Tomah, WI | Public | Indians | | 1941 | 1952 | South Central | Mississippi Valley |
| Viroqua | Viroqua, WI | Public | Blackhawks | | 1941 | 1952 | South Central | Coulee |
| Westby | Westby, WI | Public | Norsemen | | 1941 | 1952 | Juneau County | Coulee |

== List of conference champions ==
=== Gateway/North Central Conference ===
==== Boys Basketball ====
| School | Quantity | Years |
|---|---|---|
| La Crosse Logan | 8 | 1942, 1943, 1944, 1946, 1948, 1949, 1950, 1951 |
| Tomah | 6 | 1945, 1946, 1947, 1950, 1951, 1952 |
| Chippewa Falls | 0 | |
| Sparta | 0 | |
| Viroqua | 0 | |

==== Football ====
| School | Quantity | Years |
|---|---|---|
| La Crosse Logan | 3 | 1948, 1949, 1951 |
| Sparta | 1 | 1948 |
| Tomah | 1 | 1950 |
| Chippewa Falls | 0 | |
| Viroqua | 0 | |

=== West Central Conference ===
==== Boys Basketball ====
| School | Quantity | Years |
|---|---|---|
| Tomah | 8 | 1943, 1944, 1945, 1946, 1947, 1950, 1951, 1952 |
| Sparta | 2 | 1942, 1948 |
| Viroqua | 2 | 1949, 1950 |
| Mauston | 0 | |
| Westby | 0 | |

==== Football ====
| School | Quantity | Years |
|---|---|---|
| Tomah | 8 | 1943, 1944, 1945, 1946, 1947, 1949, 1950, 1951 |
| Sparta | 3 | 1942, 1947, 1948 |
| Mauston | 1 | 1947 |
| Viroqua | 1 | 1942 |
| Westby | | |
