= John C. Anderson (Wisconsin politician) =

State assemblyman (1862 – after 1918)

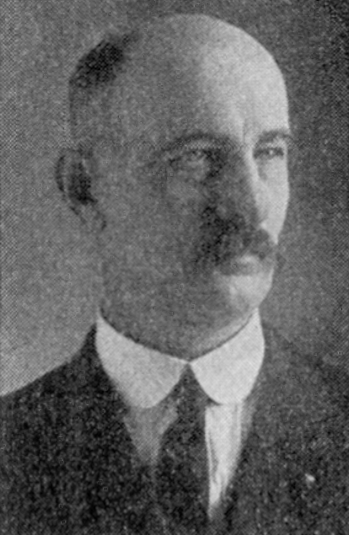

Member of the Wisconsin State Assembly
- In office 1917, 1919

Personal details
- Born: February 22, 1862 Hadley, New York, US
- Died: December 19, 1921 (aged 59) Donna, Texas, US
- Party: Republican
- Occupation: Farmer, banker, politician

John C. Anderson (February 22, 1862 – December 19, 1921) was an American politician. He was a member of the Wisconsin State Assembly.

== Biography ==
Anderson was born on February 22, 1862, in Hadley, New York. He later moved with his parents to Richland County, Wisconsin, where he became a farmer. In 1896, he settled in Cazenovia, Wisconsin, where he also became a businessman and a banker.

He died in Donna, Texas on December 19, 1921.

== Political career ==
Aderson was elected to the Assembly in 1916 and 1918. In addition, he was village treasurer and postmaster of Cazenovia. He was a Republican.
