= Sparta High School (Wisconsin) =

Coordinates: 43.94862°N 90.82208°W

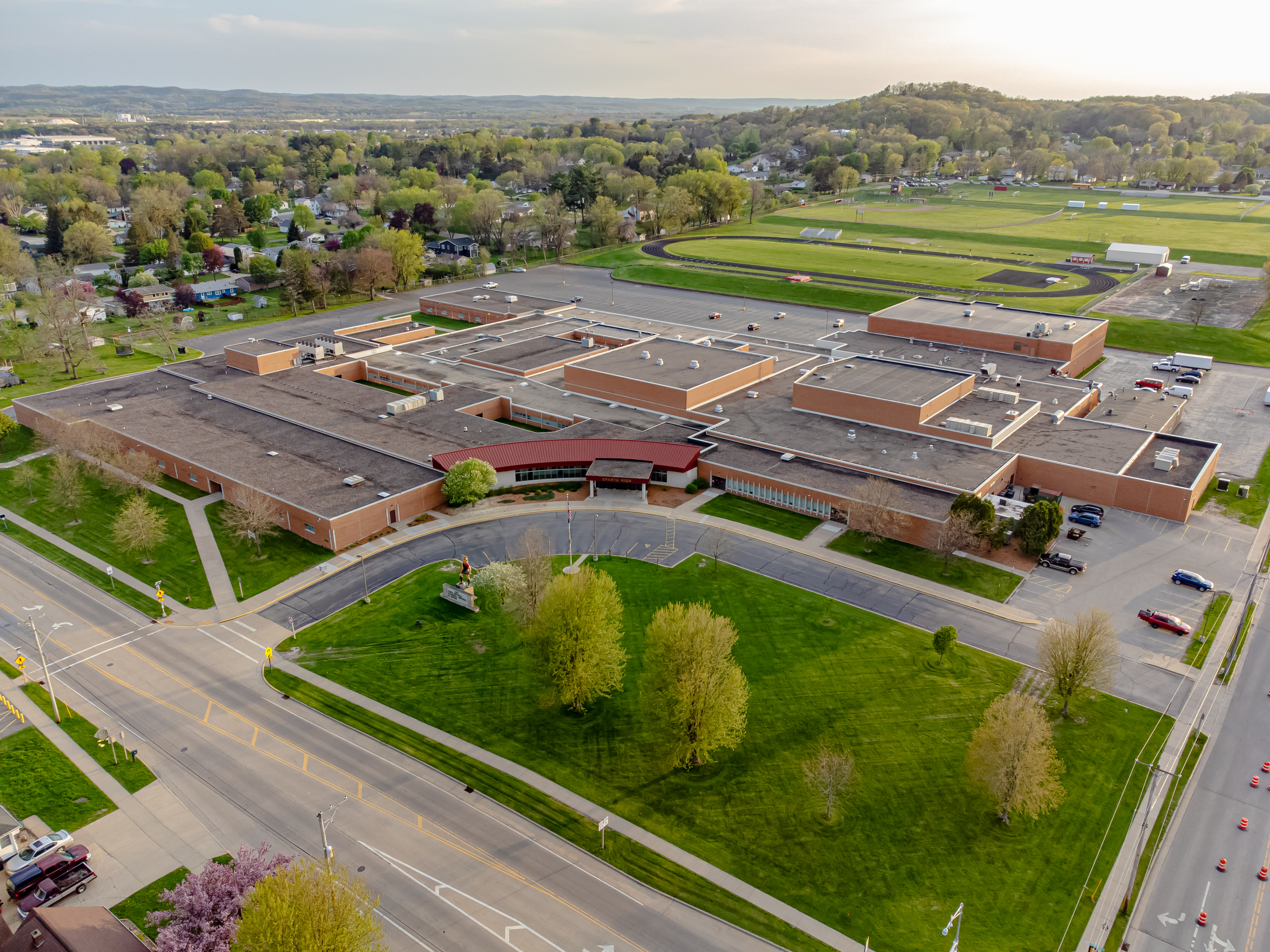

Location
- 506 N Black River St, Sparta, WI

Information
- Principal: William Ott
- Teaching staff: 57.72 (FTE)
- Enrollment: 854 (2023-2024)
- Student to teacher ratio: 14.80
- Colors: Red, gold, and white
- Athletics conference: Mississippi Valley Conference
- Mascot: Spartan

Sparta High School is the primary high school in Sparta, Wisconsin. Its colors are red and gold and its sports team's name is the Spartans.

== Athletic conference affiliation history ==
- South Central Conference (1926-1941)
- Gateway Conference (1941-1952)
- West Central Conference (1941-1947)
- North Central Conference (1947-1949)
- West Central Conference (1949-1952)
- South Central Conference (1952-1989)
- Mississippi Valley Conference (1989–present)

== Gallery ==
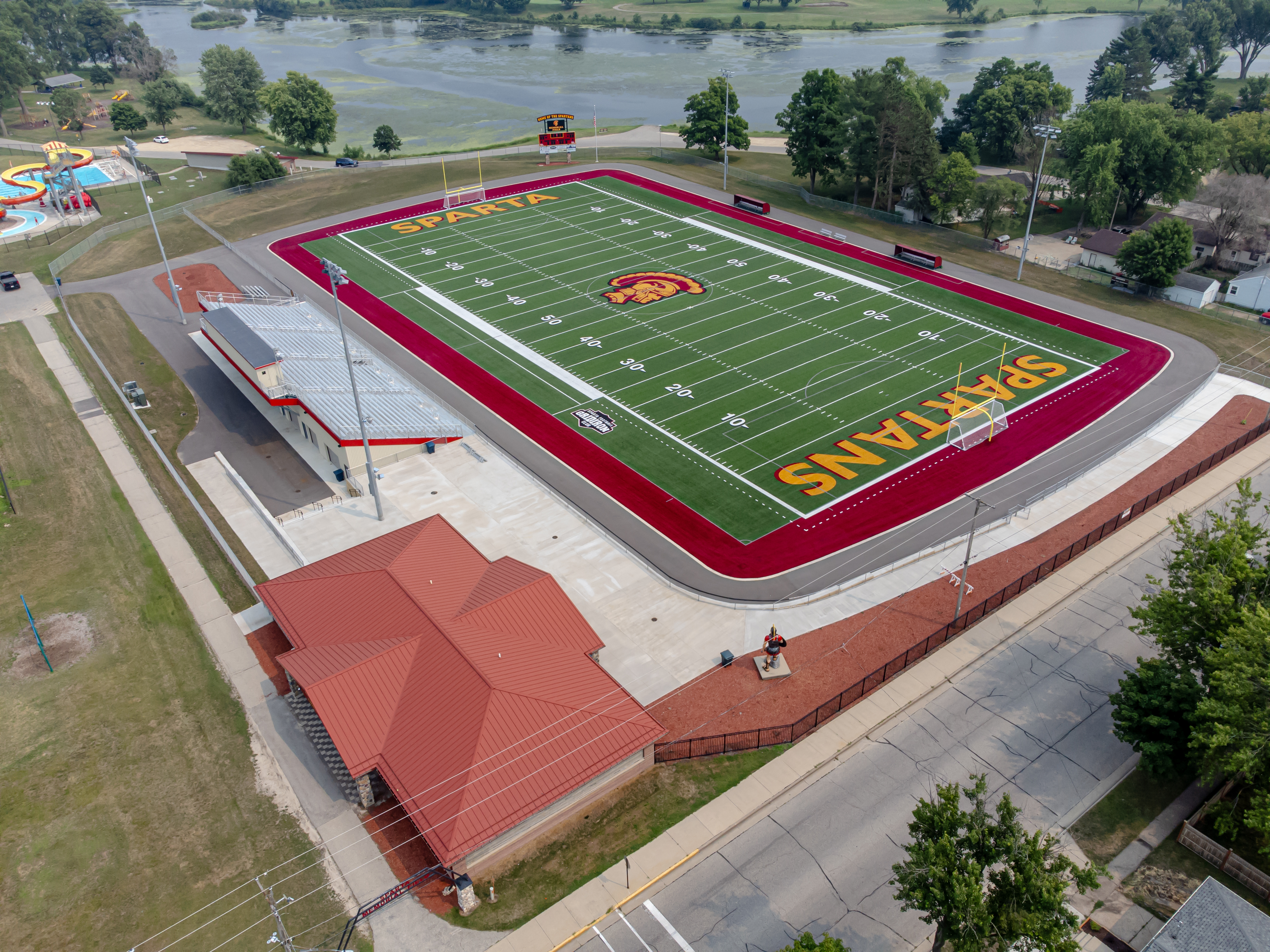
Sparta football field

== Notable alumni ==
- Deke Slayton, NASA Astronaut
- Cole Wisniewski, National Football League player for the Philadelphia Eagles

== See also ==
- Mississippi Valley Conference (Wisconsin)
