= Scenic Bluffs Conference =

Wisconsin high school athletic conference

The Scenic Bluffs Conference is a high school athletic conference in Wisconsin. Founded in 1979, its members are small schools concentrated in the southern part of the state's Driftless Area. All conference members belong to the Wisconsin Interscholastic Athletic Association.

== History ==
The Scenic Bluffs Conference was formed in 1979 when the larger Scenic Central Conference split into two smaller conferences from its existing Northern and Southern divisions. The core of the Scenic Bluffs membership came from the Northern Division of the former Scenic Central (Bangor, Brookwood, Cashton, Hillsboro, New Lisbon and Wonewoc-Center). Necedah joined from the Central State Conference, and Royall (who had previously been a Scenic Central member) joined from the Coulee Conference to round out the Scenic Bluffs Conference's membership roster. The roster of full members has not experienced any changes over the history of the conference.

=== Football ===
The Scenic Bluffs Conference has sponsored football throughout its history, starting with the eight original members of the conference. After Brookwood dropped their football program following the 1979 season, the conference dropped to seven members for football until De Soto moved over from the Ridge & Valley Conference as football-only members for the 1982 season. They would play in the conference until the 2001 season, by which time Brookwood reinstated their football program and the two schools swapped affiliations to their primary conferences. Wonewoc-Center left the Scenic Bluffs football conference after the 2015 season to join the Ridge & Valley Conference as part of a cooperative program with R&V members Weston. The Scenic Bluffs Conference remained at seven football members until the 2020 season, when a comprehensive realignment plan of Wisconsin's football conferences courtesy of the WIAA and WFCA took effect. Hillsboro left to join the Ridge & Valley Conference for football and was replaced by Luther, longtime members of the Coulee Conference members of the Southwest Wisconsin Activities League for the 2019 football season. This alignment remained in place through the 2022-2023 competition cycle. In 2024, Luther rejoined the Coulee Conference as football member after a six-year absence. They were replaced by Hillsboro and Ithaca of the Ridge & Valley League, with Hillsboro making their return to the Scenic Bluffs after four seasons in the Ridge & Valley. For the 2026-2027 realignment cycle, Ithaca will be entering into a cooperative agreement with Weston to take effect after their arrangement with Wonewoc-Center ends after the 2025 season.

== List of conference members ==
=== Current members ===
School	Location	Affiliation	Enrollment	Mascot	Colors	Joined
Bangor	Bangor, WI	Public	211	Cardinals		1979
Brookwood	Ontario, WI	Public	171	Falcons		1979
Cashton	Cashton, WI	Public	186	Eagles		1979
Hillsboro	Hillsboro, WI	Public	138	Tigers		1979
Necedah	Necedah, WI	Public	214	Cardinals		1979
New Lisbon	New Lisbon, WI	Public	154	Rockets		1979
Royall	Elroy, WI	Public	131	Panthers		1979
Wonewoc-Center	Wonewoc, WI	Public	114	Wolves		1979

=== Current associate members ===
School	Location	Affiliation	Mascot	Colors	Primary Conference	Sport(s)
Ithaca/ Weston	Ithaca, WI	Public	Bulldogs		Ridge & Valley	Football

=== Former football-only members ===
School	Location	Affiliation	Mascot	Colors	Seasons	Primary Conference
De Soto	De Soto, WI	Public	Pirates		1982-2000	Ridge & Valley
Luther	Onalaska, WI	Private (Lutheran, WELS)	Knights		2020-2023	Coulee

== Membership map ==
Scenic Bluffs Conference
Location of Scenic Bluffs Conference full members:
1 Bangor
2 Brookwood
3 Cashton
4 Hillsboro
5 Necedah
6 New Lisbon
7 Royall
8 Wonewoc-Center

== Sponsored sports ==
	Baseball	Boys Basketball	Girls Basketball	Boys Cross Country	Girls Cross Country	Football	Softball	Boys Track & Field	Girls Track & Field	Girls Volleyball	Boys Wrestling (Note: Co-sponsored with the Ridge & Valley Conference and Six Rivers Conference)	Girls Wrestling
Bangor	●	●	●	●	●	●	●	●	●	●		
Brookwood	●	●	●	●	●	●	●	●	●	●	●	●
Cashton	●	●	●	●	●	●	●	●	●	●	●	●
Hillsboro	●	●	●	●	●	●	●	●	●	●	●	●
Necedah		●	●	●	●	●	●	●	●	●		
New Lisbon	● (Note: Co-operative with New Lisbon)	●	●	●	●	●	●	●	●	●	●	●
Royall	●	●	●	● (Note: Co-operative with Wonewoc-Center)	●	●	●	●	●	●	●	●
Wonewoc-Center	●	●	●				●	●	●	●		

== List of state champions ==
=== Fall sports ===
Girls Cross Country
School	Year	Division
Brookwood	1992	Division 3
Brookwood	1993	Division 3
Brookwood	2003	Division 3

Football
School	Year	Division
Cashton	1981	Division 6
De Soto	1983	Division 6
De Soto	1984	Division 6
Bangor	2015	Division 7
Bangor	2017	Division 7

Girls Volleyball
School	Year	Division
Wonewoc-Center	2023	Division 4

=== Winter sports ===
Boys Basketball
School	Year	Division
Bangor	2018	Division 5

Girls Basketball
School	Year	Division
Bangor	1997	Division 4
Bangor	2018	Division 5

=== Spring sports ===
Baseball
School	Year	Division
Cashton	1981	Class C
Bangor	1996	Division 3
Royall	1998	Division 3

Girls Track & Field
School	Year	Division
Royall	2021	Division 3

== List of conference champions ==
=== Boys Basketball ===
School	Quantity	Years
Bangor	16	1987, 2002, 2003, 2006, 2010, 2011, 2014, 2015, 2016, 2017, 2018, 2019, 2020, 2021, 2022, 2023
Royall	12	1980, 1981, 1982, 1983, 1984, 1998, 2000, 2012, 2013, 2024, 2025, 2026
Hillsboro	10	1989, 1990, 1995, 1999, 2004, 2007, 2008, 2009, 2011, 2016
Necedah	6	1990, 1991, 1992, 1993, 1994, 2000
New Lisbon	4	1983, 1986, 1996, 1997
Brookwood	3	1985, 1988, 2005
Cashton	2	1986, 1987
Wonewoc-Center	2	2001, 2007

=== Girls Basketball ===
School	Quantity	Years
Bangor	28	1981, 1982, 1983, 1984, 1985, 1986, 1987, 1988, 1989, 1990, 1994, 1996, 1997, 2007, 2008, 2013, 2015, 2016, 2017, 2018, 2019, 2020, 2021, 2022, 2023, 2024, 2025, 2026
Royall	9	1992, 1993, 1998, 2000, 2001, 2003, 2010, 2011, 2013
Hillsboro	7	1980, 2002, 2004, 2005, 2006, 2007, 2013
New Lisbon	5	1994, 1995, 1996, 2009, 2012
Brookwood	2	2013, 2014
Cashton	2	1998, 2005
Necedah	1	1991
Wonewoc-Center	1	1999

=== Football ===
School	Quantity	Years
Bangor	13	1996, 2008, 2009, 2010, 2012, 2014, 2015, 2016, 2017, 2018, 2019, 2021, 2025
Cashton	12	1979, 1980, 1981, 1987, 1988, 1989, 1991, 1994, 1995, 1998, 2022, 2023
De Soto	9	1982, 1983, 1984, 1985, 1986, 1987, 1990, 1998, 1999
Necedah	6	1999, 2000, 2001, 2004, 2007, 2011
Royall	4	1991, 1992, 1993, 1997
New Lisbon	3	2002, 2003, 2013
Hillsboro	2	2005, 2006
Brookwood	1	2013
Ithaca	1	2024
Ithaca/ Weston	1	2026
Luther	0	
Wonewoc-Center	0	
