= Harry E. Siman =

American politician

Harry E. Siman (September 20, 1869 in Winnebago City, Minnesota – November 6, 1958) was a member of the Nebraska State Senate.

He graduated from New Lisbon High School in New Lisbon, Wisconsin in 1888. Later, Siman graduated from Morningside College. In 1898, he settled in Winside, Nebraska.

Siman married May B. Sullivan. They had two sons. He was a Methodist.

== Career ==
Siman was a member of the Senate from 1918 to 1920. Previously, he was elected Attorney of Wayne County, Nebraska in 1902 and was Street Commissioner of Sioux City, Iowa from 1895 to 1897. He was a Republican.
