= Youth Initiative High School =

Location
- 500 E. Jefferson St. Suite #302; Viroqua, Wisconsin; United States
- Coordinates: 43°33′21.1″N 90°53′00.6″W

Information
- School type: Private
- Established: 1996; 29 years ago
- CEEB code: 502342
- NCES School ID: A9703709
- Administrator: Matthew Voz
- Teaching staff: 11.5 (FTE) (2021–22)
- Grades: 9–12
- Enrollment: 74 (2021–22)
- Student to teacher ratio: 6.4:1 (2021–22)
- Mascot: Goat
- Nickname: YIHS
- Accreditation: Association of Waldorf Schools of North America (Associate Member)
- Publication: The Weekender, Kaleidoscope
- Website: www.yihs.net
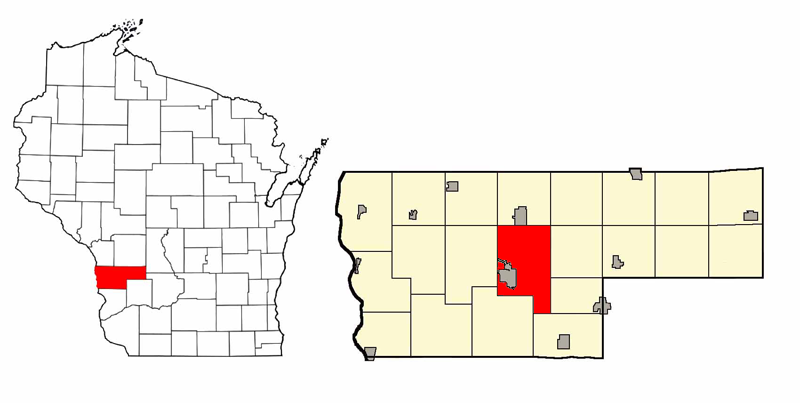
- The Youth Initiative High School is located in Viroqua, WI

Youth Initiative High School is a private high school located in Viroqua, Wisconsin. The school was started in 1996 as a collaboration between a group of students, teachers and parents. It is democratically run, with students receiving one third of the decision-making power along with parents and school faculty.

It is founded on a Waldorf curriculum and has been recognized by the Association of Waldorf Schools of North America as a developing member.

In 2015, Youth Initiative High School was chosen by the international organization Ashoka as a "Changemaker School", making it the first high school in the United States to receive the award.
