= Weston High School (Cazenovia, Wisconsin) =

Coordinates: 43.480453°N 90.190029°W

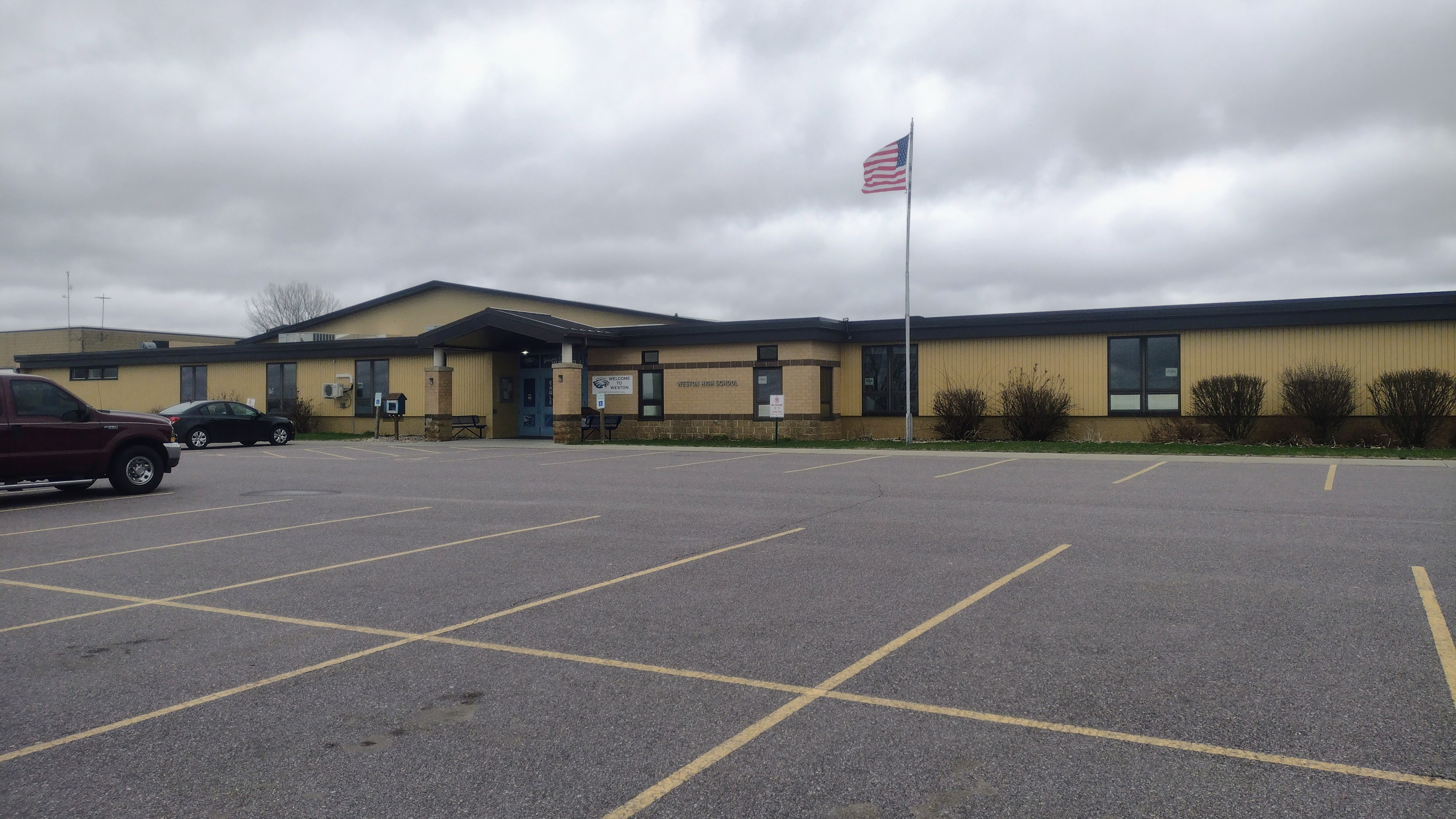

Location
- E2511 Hwy. S Cazenovia, Wisconsin 53924; United States

Information
- Type: Public, Coeducational high school
- Superintendent: Gary Syftestad
- Principal: Gary Syftestad
- Teaching staff: 9.15 (FTE)
- Grades: 9-12
- Average class size: 23
- Student to teacher ratio: 7.54
- Colors: Navy Blue & Silver
- Athletics conference: Ridge & Valley Conference
- Nickname: Silver Eagles
- Website: http://www.weston.k12.wi.us/

Weston High School is a secondary school located near the town of Cazenovia, Richland County, Wisconsin. The school also serves the villages of Hillpoint, Lime Ridge, and other parts of western Sauk County, Wisconsin.

== Athletics ==
Weston's athletic teams are nicknamed the Silver Eagles. Their colors are Columbia Blue and Silver and they have competed in the Ridge & Valley Conference since 1979.

=== Athletic conference affiliation history ===
- Wisconsin River League (1955-1960)
- I-W League (1960-1963)
- Scenic Central Conference (1963-1979)
- Ridge & Valley Conference (1979–present)

== 2006 school shooting ==
Weston High School is the site of a school shooting that occurred on September 29, 2006, that left principal John Klang dead after sustaining critical wounds. Melissa Nigh was appointed principal after Klang's death. The 15-year-old shooter, Eric Hainstock, was convicted of murder and sentenced to life in prison with the possibly of parole after 30 years.
