= Cazenovia, Wisconsin =

- Village
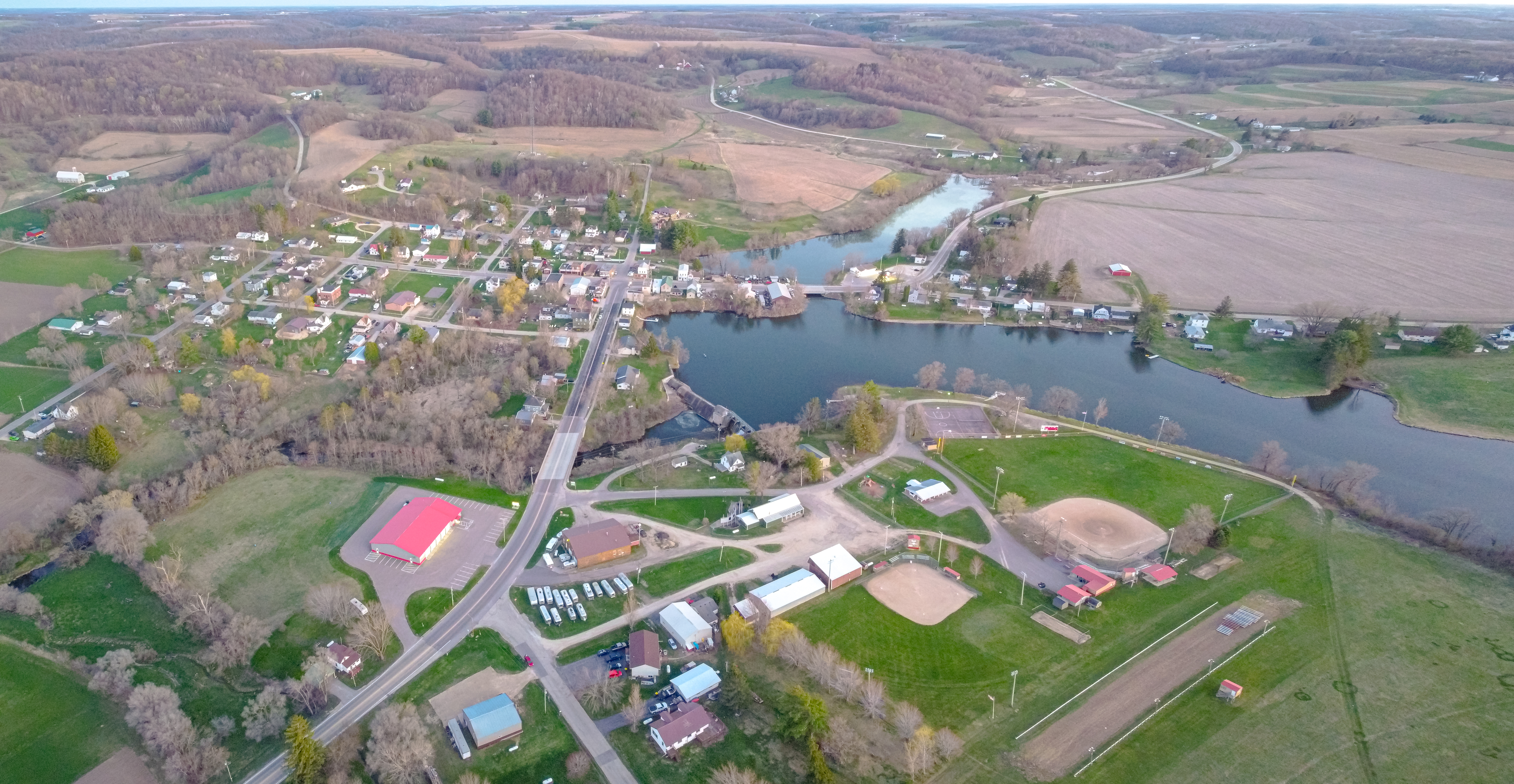
- Wis-58 runs through town. Lee Lake is formed by the hydroelectic dam.

- Location of Cazenovia in Sauk County, Wisconsin.
- Coordinates: 43°31′24″N 90°11′49″W
- Country: United States
- State: Wisconsin
- Counties: Richland, Sauk

Area
  - Total: 0.98 sq mi (2.54 km^{2})
  - Land: 0.92 sq mi (2.37 km^{2})
  - Water: 0.066 sq mi (0.17 km^{2})
- Elevation: 948 ft (289 m)

Population (2020)
  - Total: 363
  - Density: 397/sq mi (153/km^{2})
- Time zone: UTC-6 (Central (CST))
  - Summer (DST): UTC-5 (CDT)
- Area code: 608
- FIPS code: 55-13300
- GNIS feature ID: 1562828

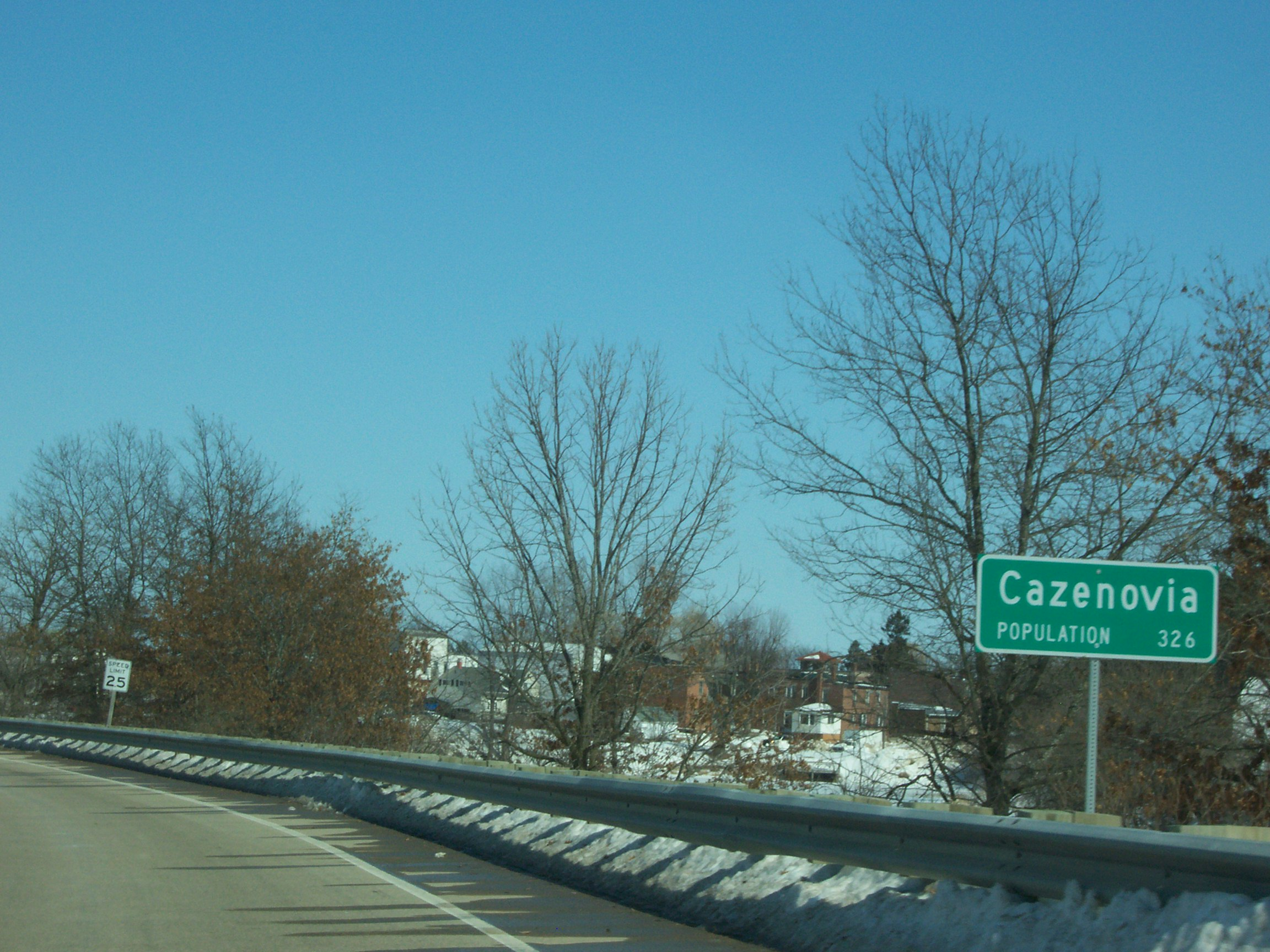
Sign for Cazenovia

Cazenovia is a village in Richland and Sauk Counties in the U.S. state of Wisconsin. The population was 363 at the 2020 census. Of this, 343 were in Richland County, and only 20 were in Sauk County.

== Geography ==
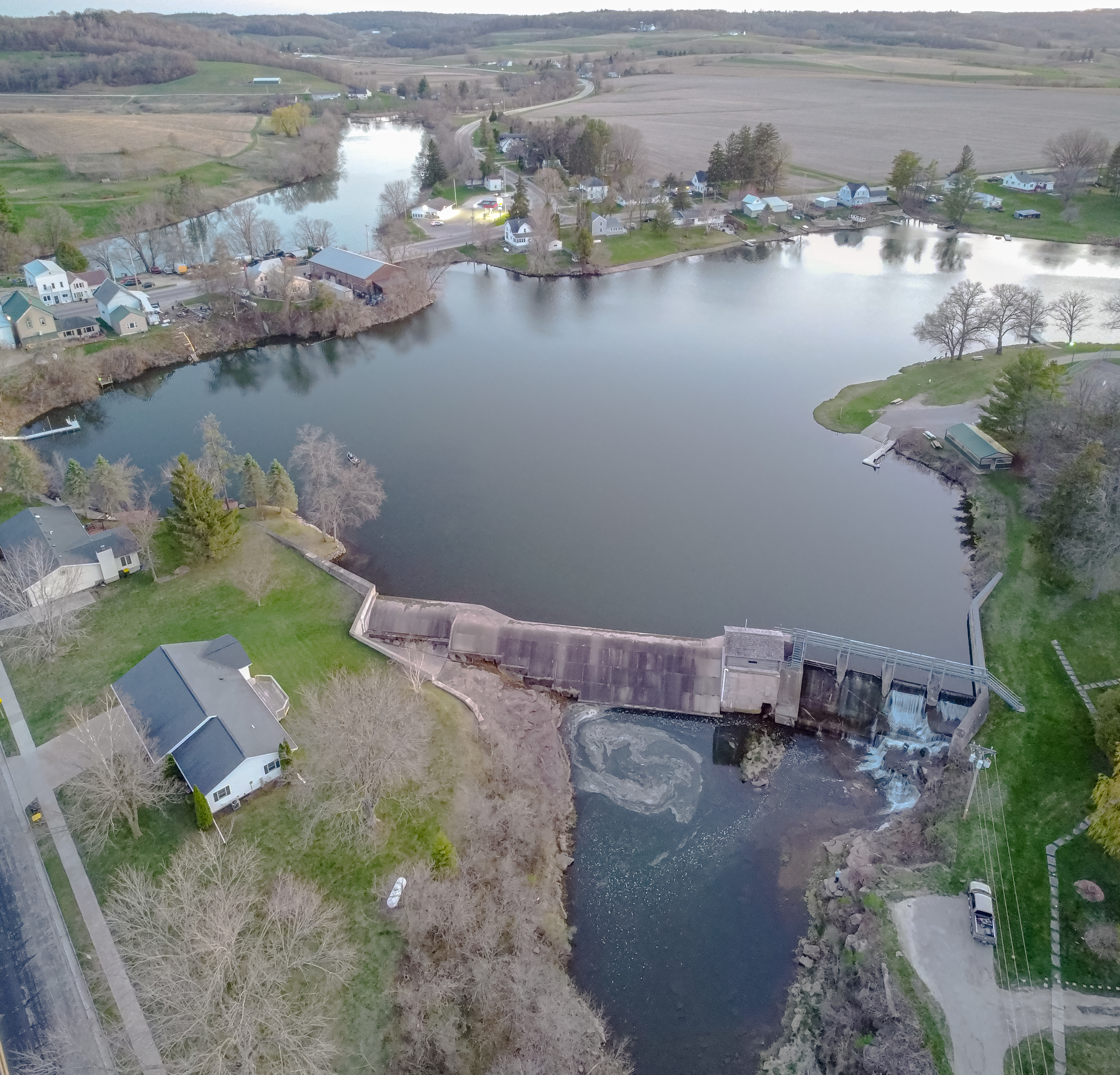
Lee Lake and hydroelectric dam

Cazenovia is located at 43°31′24″N 90°11′49″W (43.523400, -90.196894).

According to the United States Census Bureau, the village has a total area of 0.98 square miles (2.54 km^{2}), of which 0.91 square miles (2.36 km^{2}) is land and 0.07 square miles (0.18 km^{2}) is water.

== Demographics ==
Historical population
Census	Pop.	Note	%±
1880	161		—
1910	392		—
1920	488		24.5%
1930	466		−4.5%
1940	370		−20.6%
1950	403		8.9%
1960	351		−12.9%
1970	335		−4.6%
1980	259		−22.7%
1990	288		11.2%
2000	326		13.2%
2010	318		−2.5%
2020	363		14.2%
U.S. Decennial Census

=== 2010 census ===
As of the census of 2010, there were 318 people, 135 households, and 88 families living in the village. The population density was 349.5 inhabitants per square mile (134.9/km^{2}). There were 162 housing units at an average density of 178.0 per square mile (68.7/km^{2}). The racial makeup of the village was 98.1% White, 0.6% Asian, and 1.3% from two or more races. Hispanic or Latino of any race were 1.6% of the population.

There were 135 households, of which 30.4% had children under the age of 18 living with them, 45.9% were married couples living together, 16.3% had a female householder with no husband present, 3.0% had a male householder with no wife present, and 34.8% were non-families. 28.1% of all households were made up of individuals, and 13.3% had someone living alone who was 65 years of age or older. The average household size was 2.33 and the average family size was 2.78.

The median age in the village was 40.8 years. 23.6% of residents were under the age of 18; 7.8% were between the ages of 18 and 24; 23.6% were from 25 to 44; 24.5% were from 45 to 64; and 20.4% were 65 years of age or older. The gender makeup of the village was 48.7% male and 51.3% female.

=== 2000 census ===
As of the census of 2000, there were 327 people, 145 households, and 91 families living in the village. The population density was 360.3 people per square mile (139.9/km^{2}). There were 156 housing units at an average density of 172.4 per square mile (66.9/km^{2}). The racial makeup of the village was 99.08% White, 0.61% Asian, 0.31% from other races. Hispanic or Latino of any race were 0.31% of the population.

There were 145 households, out of which 26.9% had children under the age of 18 living with them, 52.4% were married couples living together, 6.2% had a female householder with no husband present, and 36.6% were non-families. 31.0% of all households were made up of individuals, and 13.1% had someone living alone who was 65 years of age or older. The average household size was 2.25 and the average family size was 2.77.

In the village, the population was spread out, with 21.5% under the age of 18, 8.3% from 18 to 24, 27.6% from 25 to 44, 22.1% from 45 to 64, and 20.6% who were 65 years of age or older. The median age was 40 years. For every 100 females, there were 98.8 males. For every 100 females age 18 and over, there were 103.2 males.

The median income for a household in the village was $34,167, and the median income for a family was $41,406. Males had a median income of $31,042 versus $24,167 for females. The per capita income for the village was $21,877. About 5.7% of families and 7.6% of the population were below the poverty line, including 5.5% of those under age 18 and 2.5% of those age 65 or over.

== Notable people ==
- John C. Anderson, Wisconsin legislator
- Joanne M. Duren, Wisconsin legislator
- Ryne Duren, baseball player
- Birney Maries Jarvis, Wisconsin legislator
- Scott O'Hara, editor, publisher, pornographic actor and activist

== School shooting ==
A school shooting occurred at the village's Weston High School on September 29, 2006. John Klang, 49, principal of the school, was killed in the attack after a recently expelled 9th grader, Eric Hainstock, fired a handgun at him. A janitor had already taken a shotgun away from him. Klang was shot after emerging from a nearby room. Hainstock shot the principal in head, chest, and leg. After being shot, the mortally wounded principal managed to disarm the former student.
