= De Soto, Wisconsin =

- Village
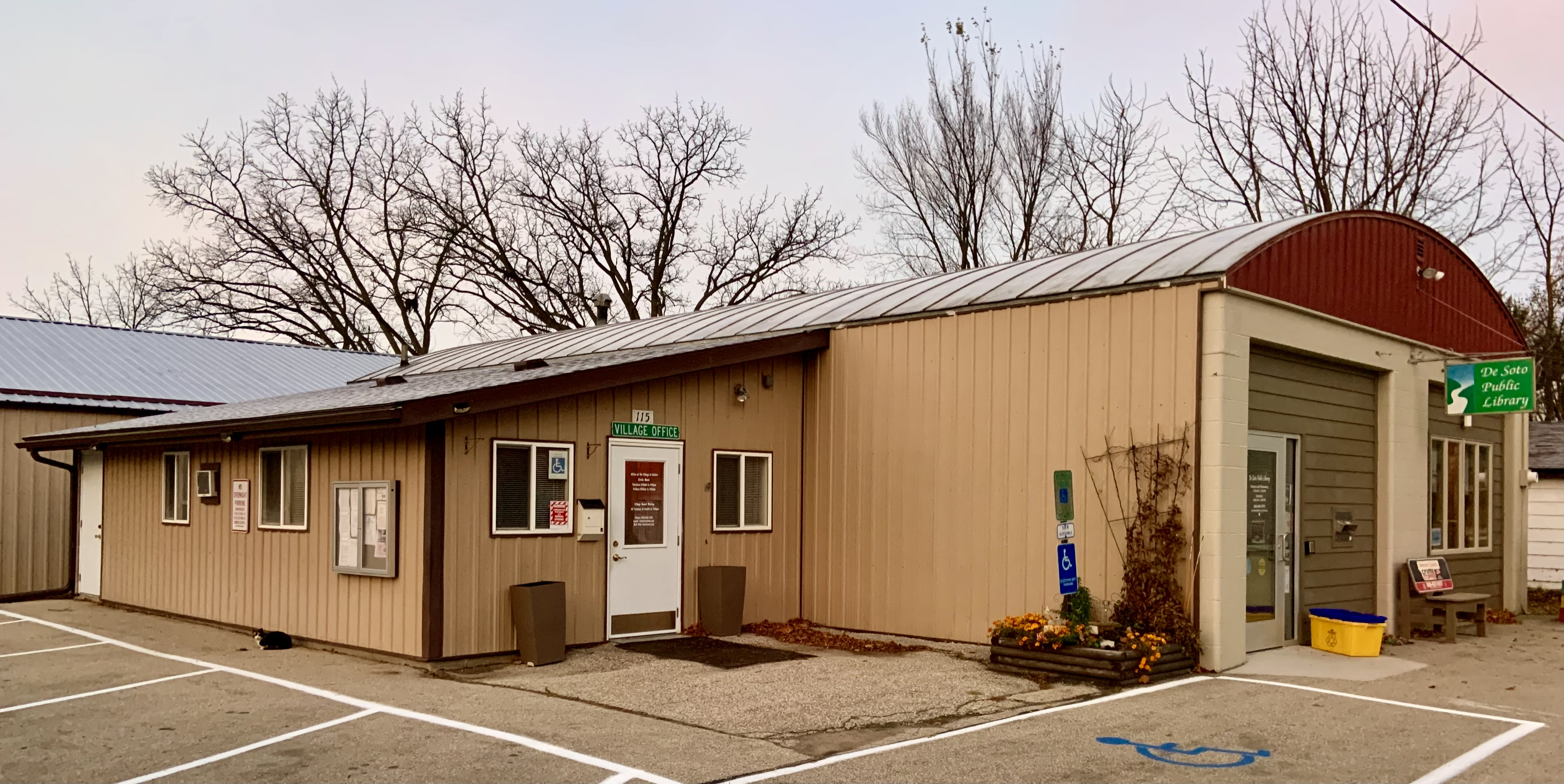
- Village hall

- Location of De Soto in Crawford County, Wisconsin.
- Coordinates: 43°25′37″N 91°11′49″W
- Country: United States
- State: Wisconsin
- Counties: Vernon, Crawford

Area
  - Total: 1.25 sq mi (3.24 km^{2})
  - Land: 1.22 sq mi (3.16 km^{2})
  - Water: 0.031 sq mi (0.08 km^{2})
- Elevation: 653 ft (199 m)

Population (2020)
  - Total: 309
  - Density: 253/sq mi (97.8/km^{2})
- Time zone: UTC-6 (Central (CST))
  - Summer (DST): UTC-5 (CDT)
- Area code: 608
- FIPS code: 55-19850
- GNIS feature ID: 1563761
- Website: www.desotowi.com

De Soto is a village mostly in Vernon County but also in Crawford County in Wisconsin, United States. The population was 309 at the 2020 census, up from 287 at the 2010 census.

== History ==
De Soto was named after Hernando de Soto, the explorer who discovered the Mississippi.

== Geography ==
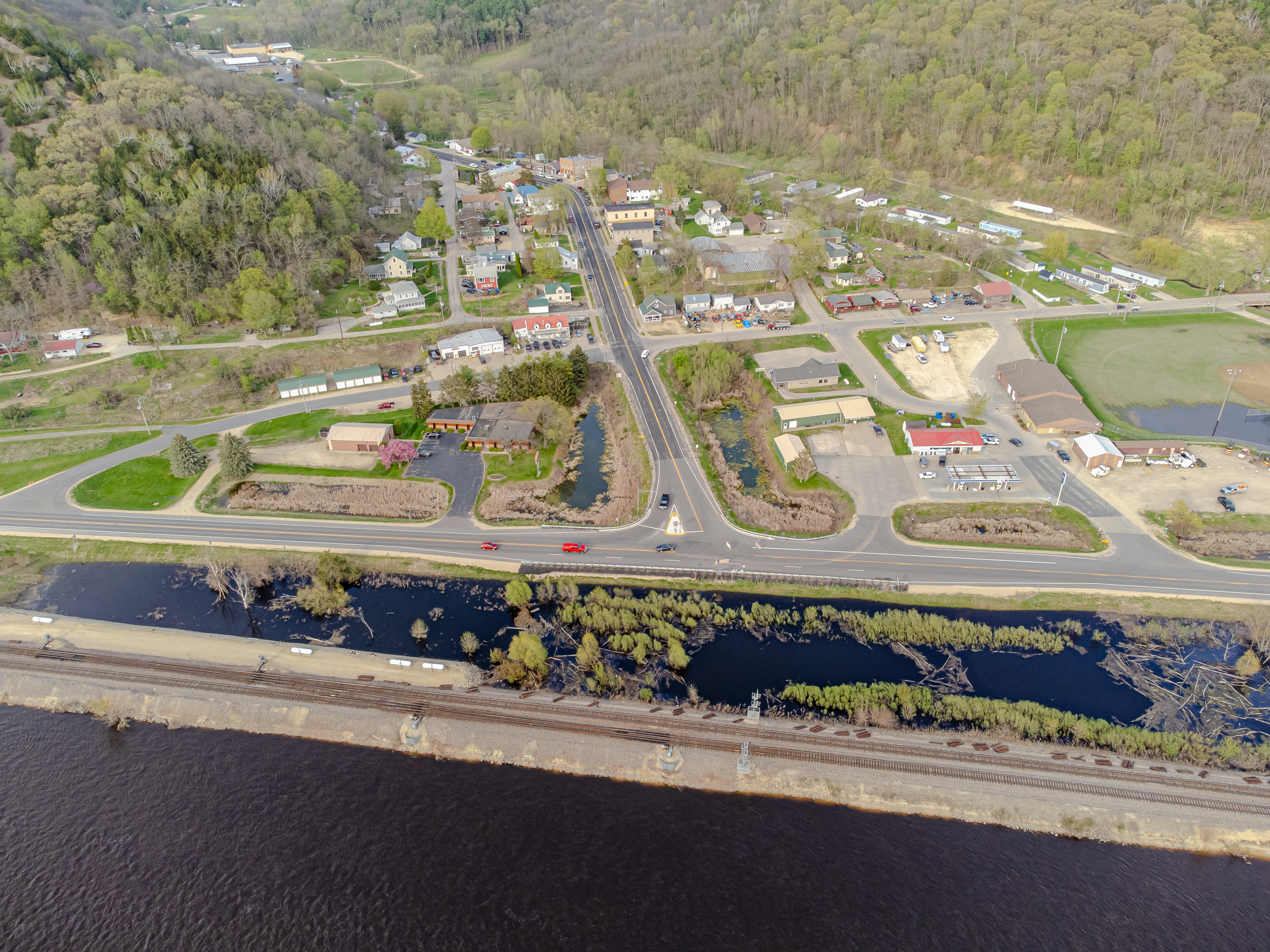

De Soto is located at 43°25′37″N 91°11′49″W (43.426905, -91.196841).

According to the United States Census Bureau, the village has a total area of 1.34 square miles (3.47 km^{2}), of which 1.25 square miles (3.24 km^{2}) is land and 0.09 square miles (0.23 km^{2}) is water.

== Demographics ==
Historical population
Census	Pop.	Note	%±
1880	301		—
1890	355		17.9%
1900	387		9.0%
1910	331		−14.5%
1920	299		−9.7%
1930	322		7.7%
1940	400		24.2%
1950	367		−8.2%
1960	357		−2.7%
1970	295		−17.4%
1980	318		7.8%
1990	326		2.5%
2000	366		12.3%
2010	287		−21.6%
2020	309		7.7%
U.S. Decennial Census

=== 2010 census ===
As of the census of 2010, there were 287 people, 129 households, and 80 families living in the village. The population density was 229.6 inhabitants per square mile (88.6/km^{2}). There were 176 housing units at an average density of 140.8 per square mile (54.4/km^{2}). The racial makeup of the village was 99.7% White and 0.3% from two or more races.

There were 129 households, of which 31.0% had children under the age of 18 living with them, 48.8% were married couples living together, 10.1% had a female householder with no husband present, 3.1% had a male householder with no wife present, and 38.0% were non-families. 31.8% of all households were made up of individuals, and 15.5% had someone living alone who was 65 years of age or older. The average household size was 2.22 and the average family size was 2.83.

The median age in the village was 44.1 years. 23.3% of residents were under the age of 18; 3.9% were between the ages of 18 and 24; 24.5% were from 25 to 44; 31.8% were from 45 to 64; and 16.7% were 65 years of age or older. The gender makeup of the village was 51.2% male and 48.8% female.

=== 2000 census ===
As of the census of 2000, there were 366 people, 151 households, and 104 families living in the village. The population density was 283.6 people per square mile (109.5/km^{2}). There were 191 housing units at an average density of 148.0 per square mile (57.2/km^{2}). The racial makeup of the village was 95.08% White, 1.64% African American, 0.55% Asian, 0.27% from other races, and 2.46% from two or more races. Hispanic or Latino of any race were 1.64% of the population.

There were 151 households, out of which 26.5% had children under the age of 18 living with them, 61.6% were married couples living together, 4.0% had a female householder with no husband present, and 30.5% were non-families. 25.2% of all households were made up of individuals, and 13.2% had someone living alone who was 65 years of age or older. The average household size was 2.42 and the average family size was 2.93.

In the village, the population was spread out, with 22.7% under the age of 18, 4.4% from 18 to 24, 23.5% from 25 to 44, 32.2% from 45 to 64, and 17.2% who were 65 years of age or older. The median age was 44 years. For every 100 females, there were 89.6 males. For every 100 females age 18 and over, there were 88.7 males.

The median income for a household in the village was $33,036, and the median income for a family was $40,000. Males had a median income of $30,313 versus $16,250 for females. The per capita income for the village was $18,042. About 7.4% of families and 7.4% of the population were below the poverty line, including 13.7% of those under age 18 and 7.0% of those age 65 or over.

== Education ==
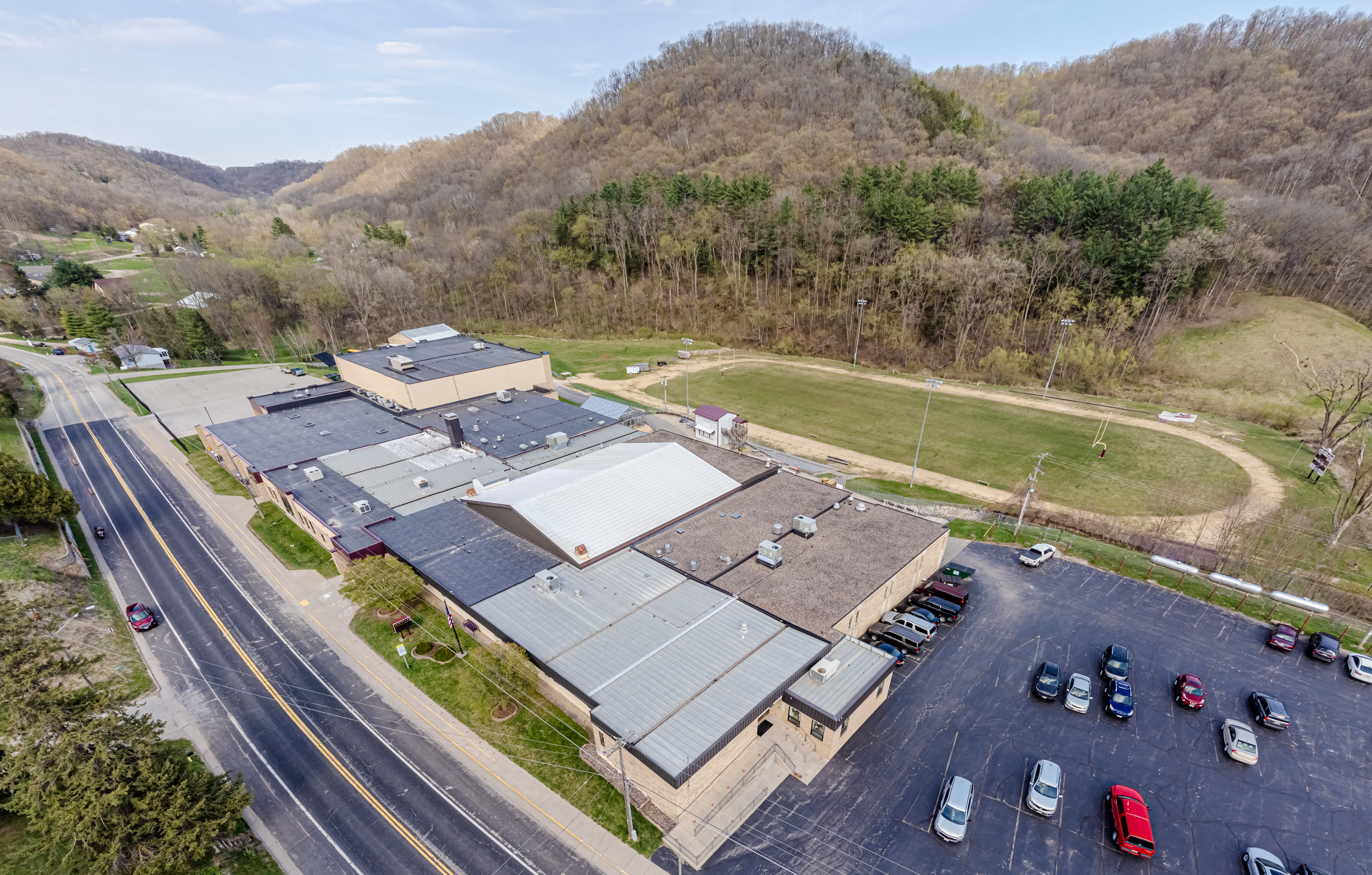
De Soto high school / middle school

The De Soto Area Schools serves De Soto, Wisconsin. De Soto Area schools consists of De Soto High/Middle School in De Soto, Wisconsin, Prairie View Elementary School and Stoddard Elementary School.

== Transportation ==
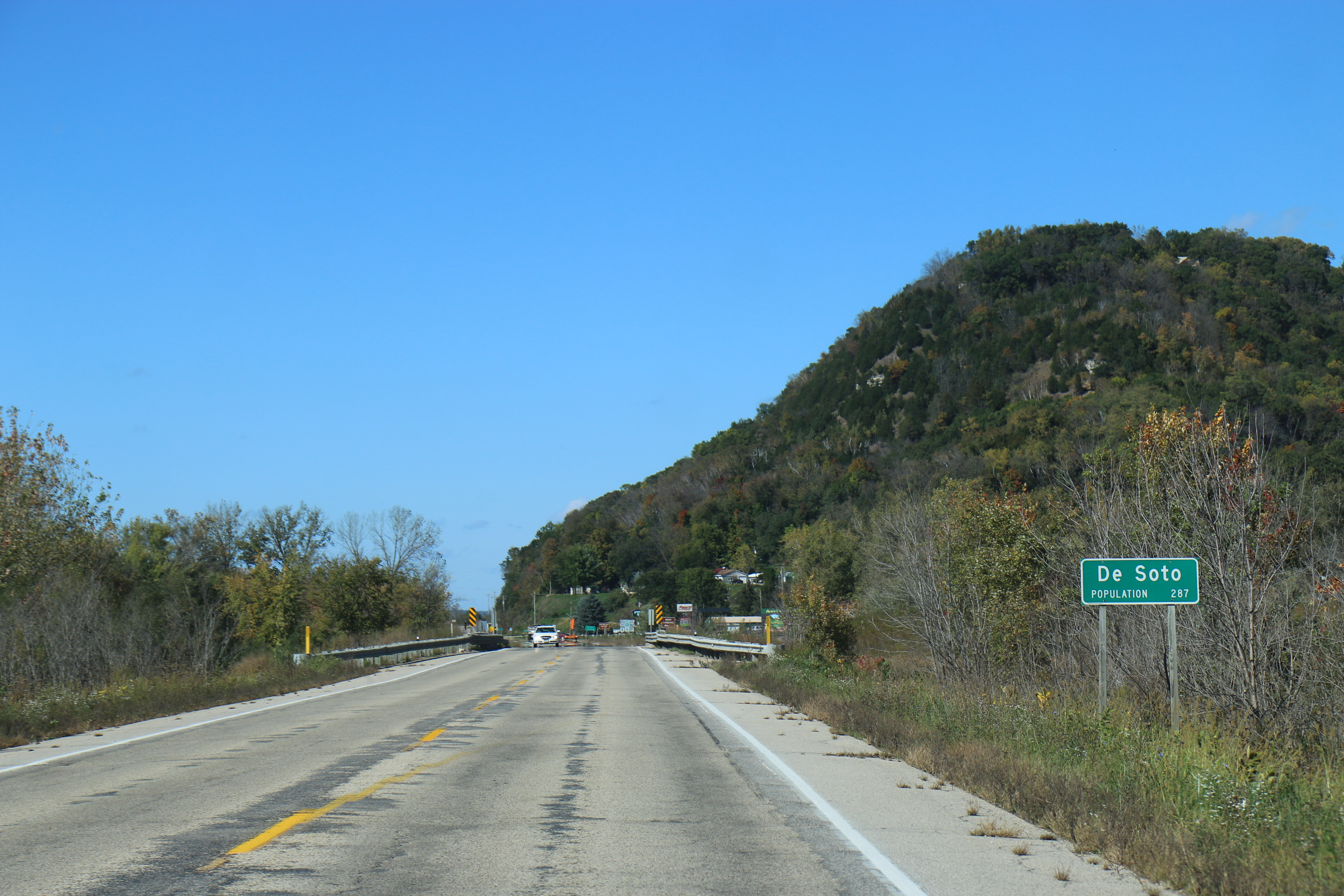
Looking northeast at the De Soto sign

Bus service towards La Crosse and Prairie du Chien is provided three times daily per direction by Scenic Mississippi Regional Transit.

== Notable people ==
- George B. Belting, Wisconsin State Representative and lawyer, was born in De Soto.
- Jacob Eckhardt, Wisconsin State Representative, lived in De Soto.
- Francis A. Wallar, Medal of Honor recipient, lived in De Soto.

== See also ==
- List of villages in Wisconsin
