= New Lisbon High School =

Wisconsin public secondary school

Coordinates: 43°52′33.7″N 90°10′10.6″W

Location
- 500 S Forest St; New Lisbon, Wisconsin 53950; United States

Information
- Type: Public Secondary
- Motto: Nothing Less Than the Best
- Established: 1858
- Administrator: Scott Hickey
- Principal: Mark Stamper
- Faculty: 23.95 (FTE)
- Grades: 9-12
- Enrollment: 248 (2022-2023)
- Student to teacher ratio: 10.35
- Colors: Royal blue and white
- Mascot: Rocket
- Website: www.newlisbon.k12.wi.us

New Lisbon High School (or NLHS) is a high school in New Lisbon, Juneau County, Wisconsin, United States. It is part of the School District of New Lisbon. The district serves students residing in the City of New Lisbon, Village of Hustler, and the towns of Clearfield, Cutler, Fountain, Germantown, Lisbon, Orange, Clifton, and Oakdale. The school is a member of the Scenic Bluffs Conference and the mascot is the Rockets.

== History ==
The first school was built in 1858, with the first frame building built in 1860. NLHS was accredited by the state in 1877. The first class to graduate was in 1878, with two students. Students moved into a three-story red brick building in 1901. On March 4, 1907, the high school burned to the ground. An overheated furnace was blamed for the fire. Until a new school was built, classes were held in churches around New Lisbon. A new high school was built in 1908, which also housed the Juneau County Teachers College (Juneau County Normal School). The teachers college dissolved in the 1970s. The current building was erected in the early 1970s with additions to the building completed in 1989 and 2000.

== Campus ==
New Lisbon High School is located at 500 S. Forest Street in New Lisbon, Wisconsin. The Arbin York Athletic Field, one block south of the high school, consists of a football field, baseball and softball diamonds, track and field areas, and a circular track. The New Lisbon Elementary and Junior High Schools are connected to the high school. There are 20 teachers in the high school. Enrollment is approximately 160.

== Extracurricular activities ==
The NLHS has a Rocket Booster Club.

During the 1930s, annual turkey races were held each spring behind the school on the athletic field. The winner of the quarter-mile run would take home the prize turkey, second place a chicken, third place a duck, and last place was the lucky booby prize of the Egg. Boxing also occurred during the 1930s and golf was an active sport until 1985.

Activities offered include Show Choir, Pep Band, Pit Band, Student Council, G.I.V.E., Forensics, Yearbook, Visual Arts Classic, Musical, FFA, FBLA, and Spanish Club.

=== Athletics ===
NLHS is a member of the Scenic Bluffs Conference. NLHS offers a variety of sports which include football, volleyball, cross country, basketball, wrestling, cheerleading, baseball, softball, and track and field.

Fundraising for a new athletic complex began in September 2017 with the construction of a ticket booth, restrooms, and concessions stand. This project will be completed in Spring 2018.

== Notable alumni ==
- Marc Andreessen class of 1989, co-founder of Netscape Communications Corporation and Mosaic (web browser)
- Linda Balgord, class of 1978, Broadway actress, Cats (Grizabella)
- Truman Lowe, class of 1962, sculptor
- Harry E. Siman, class of 1888, member of the Nebraska State Senate

== Sources ==
Notes

Bibliography

- Turner, Jayne M. Historic New Lisbon, Portage, Wis.: O'Brien Publishing, 2004.
- Wa-du-Shuda Yearbooks 1929 & 1936
- New Lisbon Centennial, City of New Lisbon, 1954.
- Juneau County: The First Years, Juneau County Historical Society and New Past Press, 1988.
