= Ontario, Wisconsin =

- Village
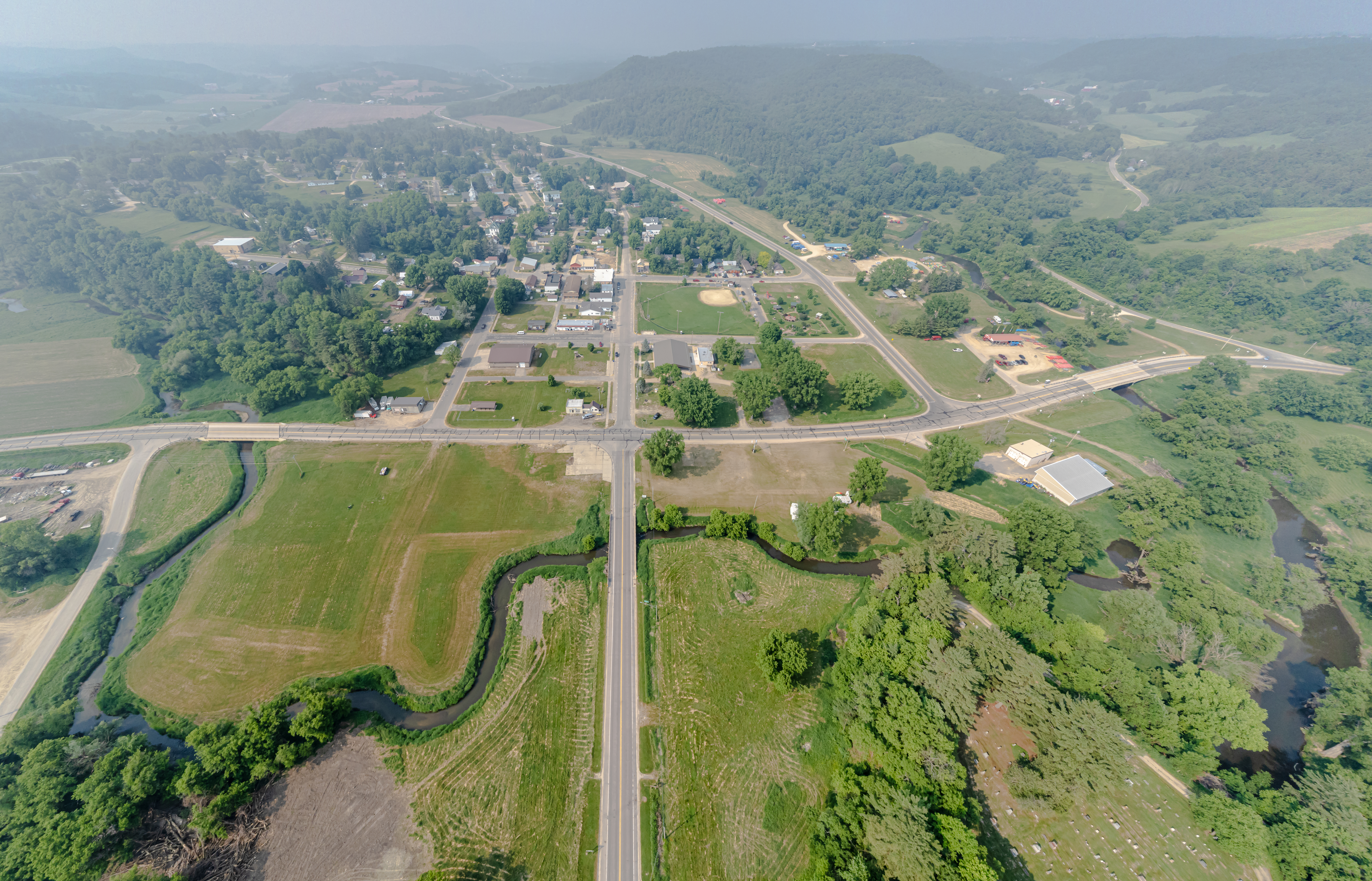

- Location of Ontario in Vernon County, Wisconsin.
- Coordinates: 43°43′24″N 90°35′31″W
- Country: United States
- State: Wisconsin
- County: Vernon

Area
  - Total: 1.01 sq mi (2.62 km^{2})
  - Land: 1.00 sq mi (2.60 km^{2})
  - Water: 0.0077 sq mi (0.02 km^{2})
- Elevation: 920 ft (280 m)

Population (2020)
  - Total: 534
  - Density: 532/sq mi (205/km^{2})
- Time zone: UTC-6 (Central (CST))
  - Summer (DST): UTC-5 (CDT)
- Area code: 608
- FIPS code: 55-60075
- GNIS feature ID: 1570841
- Website: ontariowi.com

Ontario is a village in Vernon County, Wisconsin, United States. The population was 534 at the 2020 census.

== Geography ==
Ontario is located at 43°43′24″N 90°35′31″W (43.723396, -90.591999).

According to the United States Census Bureau, the village has a total area of 1.01 square miles (2.62 km^{2}), of which 1.00 square mile (2.59 km^{2}) is land and 0.01 square miles (0.03 km^{2}) is water.

== Demographics ==
Historical population
Census	Pop.	Note	%±
1880	179		—
1900	389		—
1910	304		−21.9%
1920	311		2.3%
1930	330		6.1%
1940	533		61.5%
1950	527		−1.1%
1960	448		−15.0%
1970	392		−12.5%
1980	398		1.5%
1990	407		2.3%
2000	476		17.0%
2010	554		16.4%
2020	534		−3.6%
U.S. Decennial Census

=== 2010 census ===
As of the census of 2010, there were 554 people, 210 households, and 135 families living in the village. The population density was 554.0 inhabitants per square mile (213.9/km^{2}). There were 253 housing units at an average density of 253.0 per square mile (97.7/km^{2}). The racial makeup of the village was 88.3% White, 1.3% Native American, 1.1% Asian, 7.8% from other races, and 1.6% from two or more races. Hispanic or Latino of any race were 14.8% of the population.

There were 210 households, of which 34.3% had children under the age of 18 living with them, 45.2% were married couples living together, 11.0% had a female householder with no husband present, 8.1% had a male householder with no wife present, and 35.7% were non-families. 29.5% of all households were made up of individuals, and 15.8% had someone living alone who was 65 years of age or older. The average household size was 2.64 and the average family size was 3.28.

The median age in the village was 31.5 years. 31.9% of residents were under the age of 18; 7.5% were between the ages of 18 and 24; 23.5% were from 25 to 44; 19.5% were from 45 to 64; and 17.5% were 65 years of age or older. The gender makeup of the village was 47.8% male and 52.2% female.

=== 2000 census ===
As of the census of 2000, there were 476 people, 225 households, and 134 families living in the village. The population density was 470.1 people per square mile (182.0/km^{2}). There were 254 housing units at an average density of 250.9 per square mile (97.1/km^{2}). The racial makeup of the village was 94.96% White, 0.84% Native American, 3.78% from other races, and 0.42% from two or more races. Hispanic or Latino of any race were 4.83% of the population.

There were 225 households, out of which 24.4% had children under the age of 18 living with them, 43.6% were married couples living together, 11.6% had a female householder with no husband present, and 40.4% were non-families. 36.4% of all households were made up of individuals, and 21.8% had someone living alone who was 65 years of age or older. The average household size was 2.12 and the average family size was 2.73.

In the village, the population was spread out, with 21.4% under the age of 18, 7.8% from 18 to 24, 21.8% from 25 to 44, 24.2% from 45 to 64, and 24.8% who were 65 years of age or older. The median age was 44 years. For every 100 females, there were 93.5 males. For every 100 females age 18 and over, there were 92.8 males.

The median income for a household in the village was $23,194, and the median income for a family was $28,750. Males had a median income of $23,333 versus $17,083 for females. The per capita income for the village was $13,893. About 14.2% of families and 22.4% of the population were below the poverty line, including 35.1% of those under age 18 and 24.1% of those age 65 or over.

== Attractions ==
- Wildcat Mountain State Park is located near Ontario.
- The beautiful parks and animals.

== Gallery ==
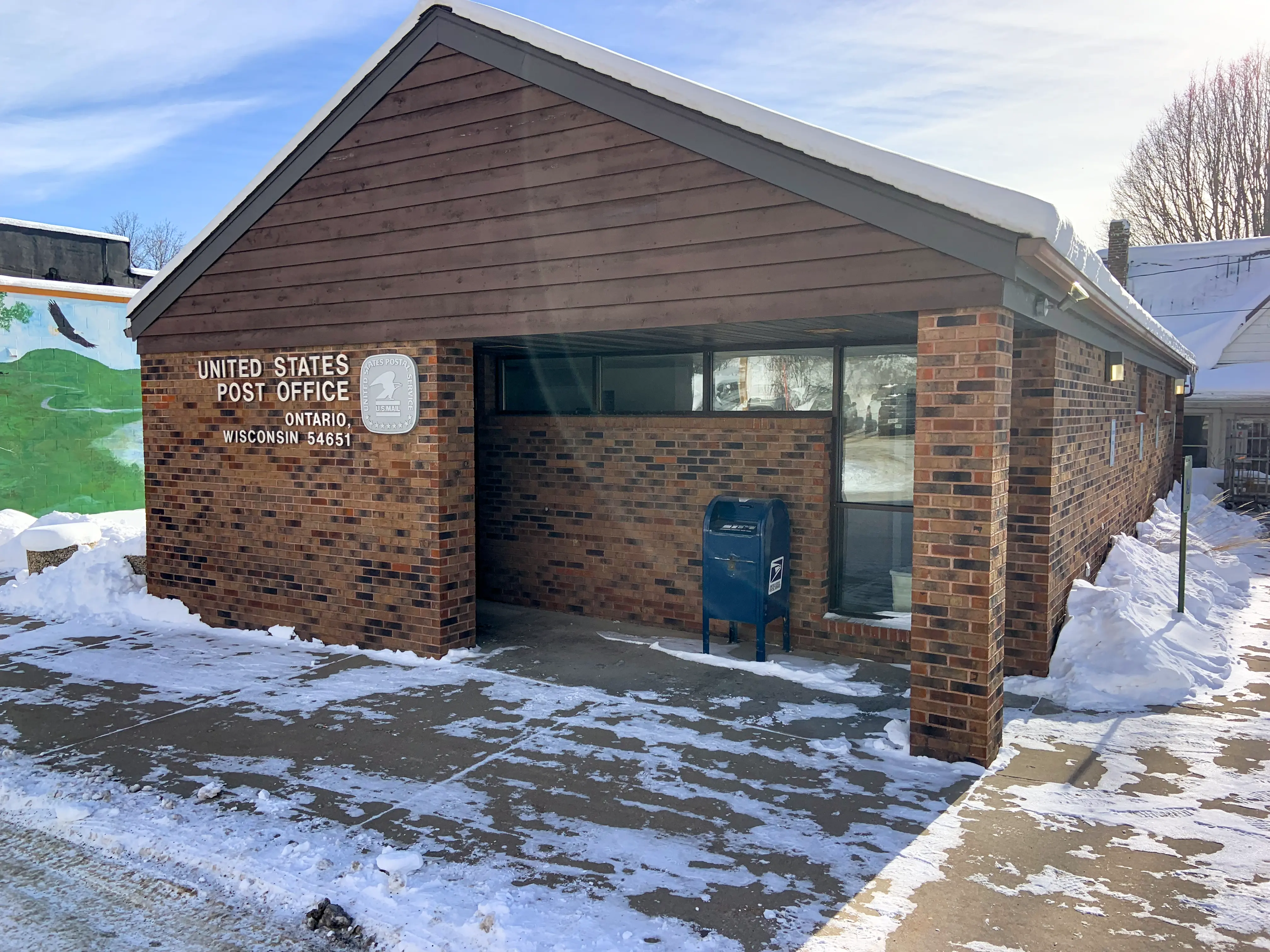
post office

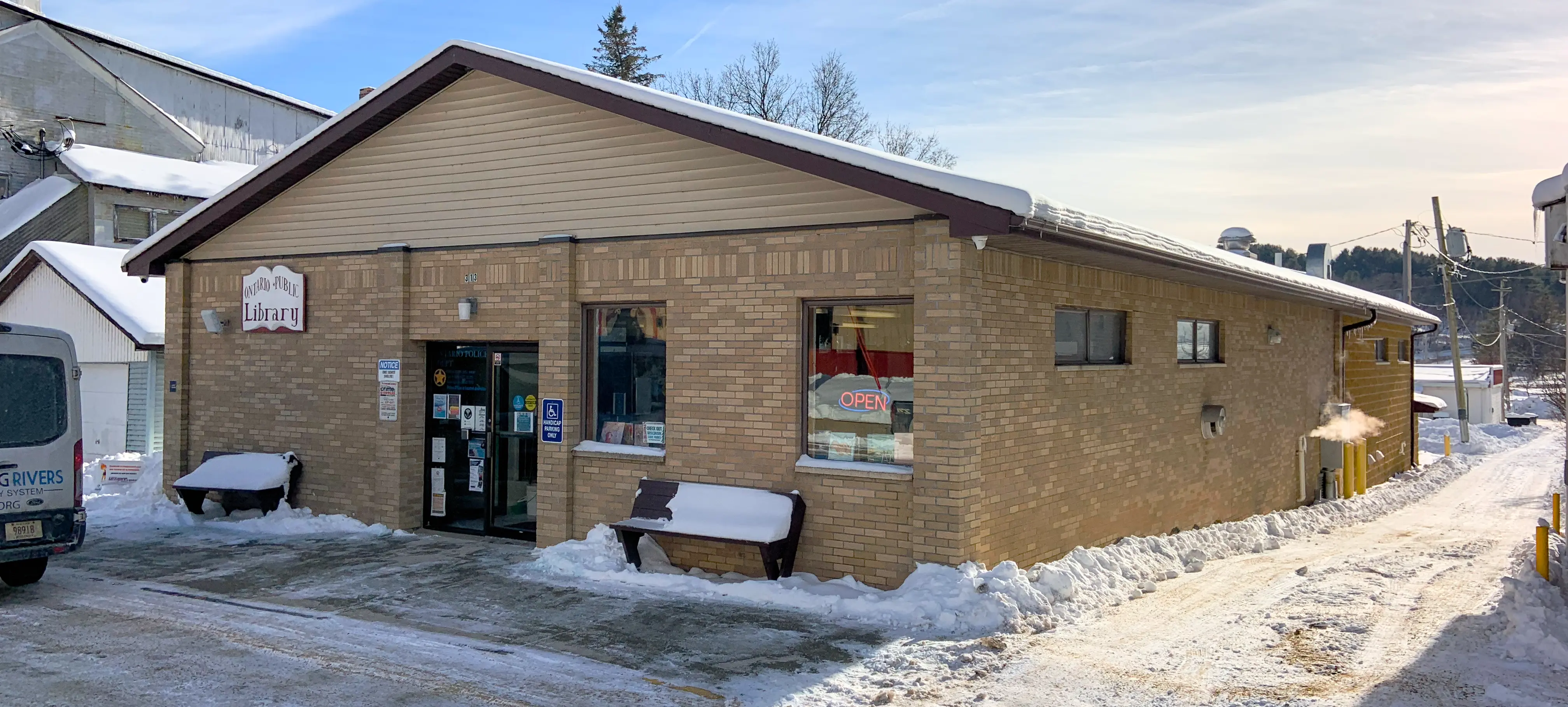
public library

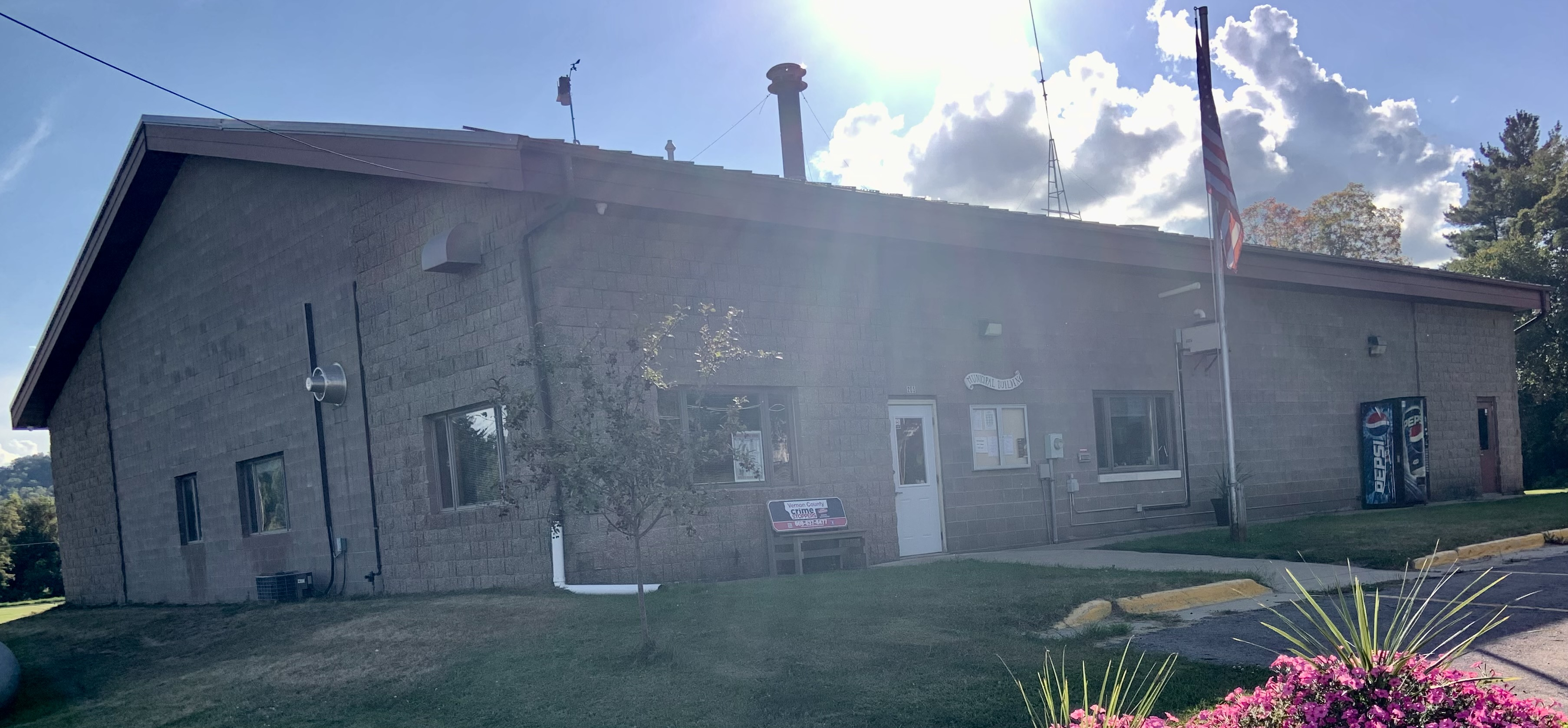
Village hall

== See also ==
- List of villages in Wisconsin
