= List of school districts in Wisconsin =

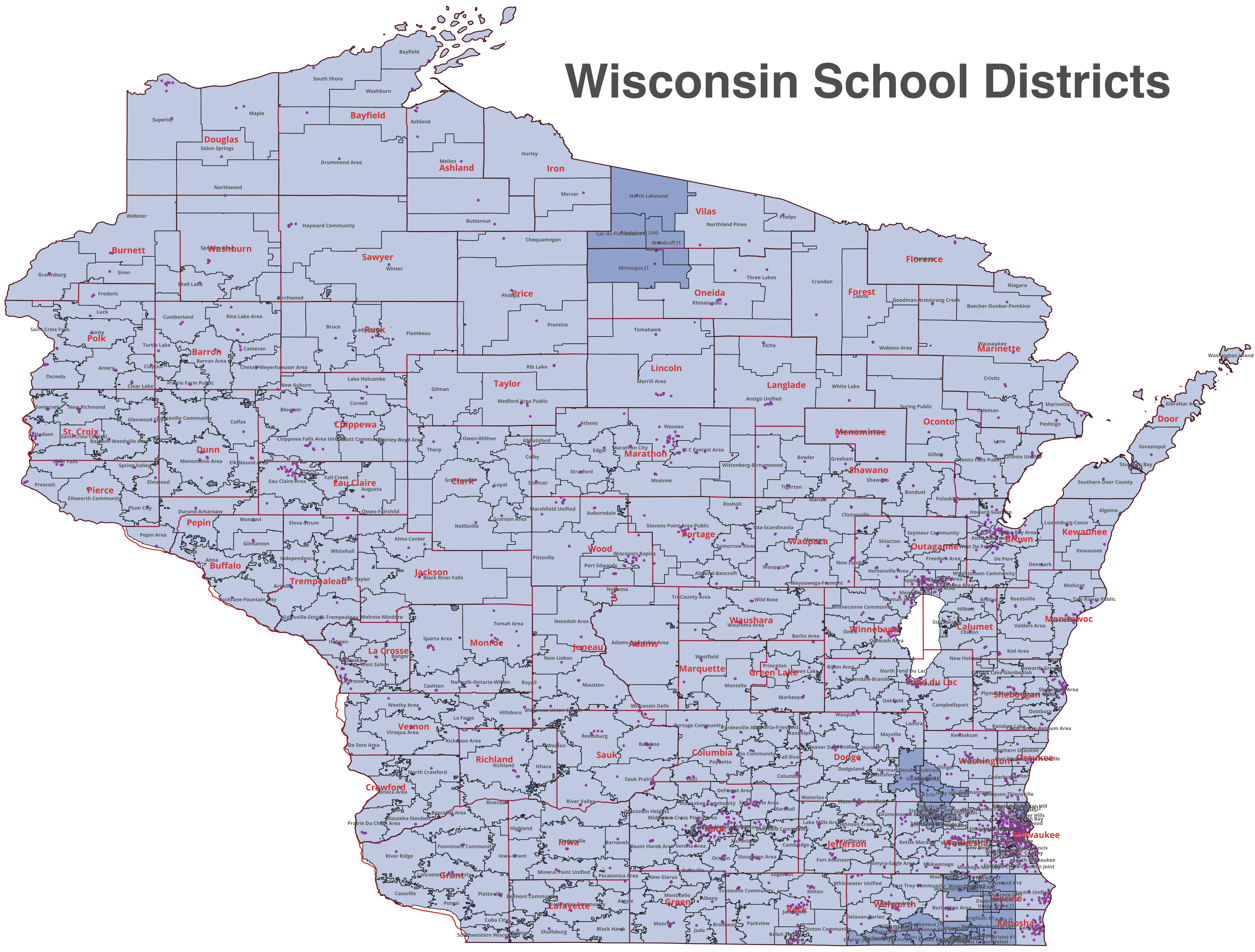
Wisconsin School Districts. Black lines are school district boundaries, red lines are county lines, and the dots are public school locations.

This is a complete list of school districts in the state of Wisconsin.

The school districts in the state are independent governments. The sole public school systems that are dependent on another layer of government are the county-operated children with disabilities education boards.

== CESA 1 ==
=== Kenosha County ===
- Kenosha School District

=== Milwaukee County ===
- Brown Deer School District
- Cudahy School District
- Fox Point J2 School District
- Franklin Public School District
- Glendale-River Hills School District
- Greendale School District
- Greenfield School District
- Hamilton School District
- Hartland-Lakeside J3 School District
- Maple Dale-Indian Hill School District
- Milwaukee Public Schools
- Nicolet Union High Sch District
- Oak Creek-Franklin Joint School District
- Saint Francis School District
- Shorewood School District
- South Milwaukee School District
- Wauwatosa School District
- West Allis-West Milwaukee School District
- Whitefish Bay School District
- Whitnall School District

=== Ozaukee County ===
- Cedarburg School District
- Grafton School District
- Mequon-Thiensville School District
- Northern Ozaukee School District
- Port Washington-Saukville School District

=== Racine County ===
- Racine Unified School District

=== Washington County ===
- Germantown School District

=== Waukesha County ===
- Arrowhead UHS School District
- Elmbrook School District
- Kettle Moraine School District
- Lake Country School District
- Menomonee Falls School District
- Merton Community School District
- Mukwonago School District
- Muskego-Norway School District
- New Berlin School District
- Norris School District
- North Lake School District
- Oconomowoc Area School District
- Pewaukee School District
- Richmond School District
- Stone Bank School District
- Swallow School District
- Waukesha School District

== CESA 2 ==
=== Dane County ===
- Belleville School District
- Cambridge School District
- De Forest Area School District
- Deerfield Community School District
- Madison Metropolitan School District
- Marshall School District
- McFarland School District
- Middleton-Cross Plains Area School District
- Monona Grove School District
- Mount Horeb Area School District
- Oregon School District
- Stoughton Area School District
- Sun Prairie Area School District
- Verona Area School District
- Waunakee Community School District
- Wisconsin Heights School District

=== Green County ===
- Albany School District
- Brodhead School District
- Monroe School District
- Monticello School District
- New Glarus School District

=== Jefferson County ===
- Fort Atkinson School District
- School District of Jefferson
- Johnson Creek School District
- Lake Mills Area School District
- Palmyra-Eagle Area School District
- Waterloo School District
- Watertown Unified School District

=== Kenosha County ===
- Brighton #1 School District
- Bristol #1 School District
- Central/Westosha UHS School District
- Paris J1 School District
- Salem School District
- Silver Lake J1 School District
- Trevor-Wilmot Consolidated School District
- Twin Lakes #4 School District
- Wheatland J1 School District
- Wilmot UHS School District

=== Racine County ===
- Burlington Area School District
- Dover #1 School District
- North Cape School District
- Norway J7 School District
- Randall J1 School District
- Raymond #14 School District
- Union Grove J1 School District
- Union Grove UHS School District
- Washington-Caldwell School District
- Waterford Graded J1 School District
- Waterford UHS School District
- Yorkville J2 School District

=== Rock County ===
- Beloit School District
- Beloit Turner School District
- Clinton Community School District
- Edgerton School District
- Evansville Community School District
- Janesville School District
- Milton School District
- Parkview School District

=== Walworth County ===
- Big Foot UHS School District
- Delavan-Darien School District
- East Troy Community School District
- Elkhorn Area School District
- Fontana J8 School District
- Geneva J4 School District
- Genoa City J2 School District
- Lake Geneva J1 School District
- Lake Geneva-Genoa City UHS School District
- Linn J4 School District
- Linn J6 School District
- Sharon J11 School District
- Walworth J1 School District
- Whitewater Unified School District
- Williams Bay School District

== CESA 3 ==
=== Crawford County ===
- North Crawford School District
- Prairie du Chien Area School District
- Seneca Area School District
- Wauzeka-Steuben School District

=== Grant County ===
- Boscobel Area School District
- Cassville School District
- Cuba City School District
- Fennimore Community School District
- Lancaster Community School District
- Platteville School District
- Potosi School District
- River Ridge School District
- Riverdale School District
- Southwestern Wisconsin School District

=== Iowa County ===
- Barneveld School District
- Dodgeville School District
- Highland School District
- Iowa-Grant School District
- Mineral Point Unified School District

=== Lafayette County ===
- Argyle School District
- Belmont Community School District
- Benton School District
- Black Hawk School District
- Darlington Community School District
- Pecatonica Area School District
- Shullsburg School District

=== Richland County ===
- Ithaca School District
- Richland School District

=== Sauk County ===
- River Valley School District
- Weston School District

=== Vernon County ===
- Kickapoo Area School District

== CESA 4 ==
=== Buffalo County ===
- Alma School District
- Cochrane-Fountain City School District

=== Jackson County ===
- Alma Center School District
- Black River Falls School District
- Melrose-Mindoro School District

=== Juneau County ===
- Royall School District
- Wonewoc-Union Center School District

=== La Crosse County ===
- Bangor School District
- Holmen School District
- La Crosse School District
- Onalaska School District
- West Salem School District

=== Monroe County ===
- Cashton School District
- Norwalk-Ontario-Wilton School District
- Sparta Area School District
- Tomah Area School District

=== Trempealeau County ===
- Arcadia School District
- Blair-Taylor School District
- Galesville-Ettrick-Trempealeau School District
- Independence School District
- Whitehall School District

=== Vernon County ===
- De Soto Area School District
- Hillsboro School District
- La Farge School District
- Viroqua Area School District
- Westby Area School District

== CESA 5 ==
=== Adams County ===
- Adams-Friendship Area School District

=== Columbia County ===
- Cambria-Friesland School District
- Columbus School District
- Fall River School District
- Lodi School District
- Pardeeville Area School District
- Portage Community School District
- Poynette School District
- Rio Community School District

=== Dodge County ===
- Randolph School District

=== Green Lake County ===
- Princeton School District

=== Juneau County ===
- Mauston School District
- Necedah Area School District
- New Lisbon School District

=== Marquette County ===
- Montello School District
- School District of Westfield

=== Portage County ===
- Almond-Bancroft School District
- Rosholt School District
- Stevens Point Area Public School District
- Tomorrow River School District

=== Sauk County ===
- Baraboo School District
- Reedsburg School District
- Sauk Prairie School District
- Wisconsin Dells School District

=== Waupaca County ===
- Iola-Scandinavia School District
- Waupaca School District
- Wautoma Area School District

=== Waushara County ===
- Tri-County Area School District
- Wild Rose School District

=== Wood County ===
- Auburndale School District
- Marshfield Unified School District
- Nekoosa School District
- Pittsville School District
- Port Edwards School District
- Wisconsin Rapids School District

== CESA 6 ==
=== Dodge County ===
- Beaver Dam Unified School District
- Dodgeland School District
- Herman-Neosho-Rubicon School District
- Horicon School District
- Hustisford School District
- Lomira School District
- Mayville School District

=== Fond du Lac County ===
- Campbellsport School District
- Fond du Lac School District
- North Fond du Lac School District
- Oakfield School District
- Ripon Area School District
- Rosendale-Brandon School District
- Waupun School District

=== Green Lake County ===
- Berlin Area School District
- Green Lake School District
- Markesan School District

=== Outagamie County ===
- Appleton Area School District
- Freedom Area School District
- Hortonville Area School District
- Kaukauna Area School District
- Kimberly Area School District
- Little Chute Area School District
- Shiocton School District

=== Washington County ===
- Erin School District
- Hartford J1 School District
- Hartford UHS School District
- Holy Hill Area School District
- Kewaskum School District
- Slinger School District
- West Bend School District

=== Waupaca County ===
- Manawa School District
- New London School District
- Weyauwega-Fremont School District

=== Winnebago County ===
- Menasha Joint School District
- Neenah Joint School District
- Omro School District
- Oshkosh Area School District
- Winneconne Community School District

== CESA 7 ==
=== Brown County ===
- Ashwaubenon School District
- De Pere School District
- Denmark School District
- Green Bay Area Public School District
- Howard-Suamico School District
- Pulaski Community School District
- West De Pere School District
- Wrightstown Community School District

=== Calumet County ===
- Brillion School District
- Chilton School District
- Hilbert School District
- New Holstein School District
- Stockbridge School District

=== Door County ===
- Gibraltar Area School District
- Sevastopol School District
- Southern Door County School District
- Sturgeon Bay School District
- Washington Island School District

=== Kewaunee County ===
- Algoma School District
- Kewaunee School District
- Luxemburg-Casco School District

=== Manitowoc County ===
- Kiel Area School District
- Manitowoc School District
- Mishicot School District
- Reedsville School District
- Two Rivers Public School District
- Valders Area School District

=== Outagamie County ===
- Seymour Community School District

=== Sheboygan County ===
- Cedar Grove-Belgium Area School District
- Elkhart Lake-Glenbeulah School District
- Howards Grove School District
- Kohler School District
- Oostburg School District
- Plymouth Joint School District
- Random Lake School District
- Sheboygan Area School District
- Sheboygan Falls School District

== CESA 8 ==
=== Florence County ===
- Florence County School District

=== Forest County ===
- Crandon School District
- Laona School District
- Wabeno Area School District

=== Langlade County ===
- White Lake School District

=== Marinette County ===
- Beecher-Dunbar-Pembine School District
- Coleman School District
- Crivitz School District
- Goodman-Armstrong Creek School District
- Marinette School District
- Niagara School District
- Peshtigo School District
- Wausaukee School District

=== Menominee County ===
- Menominee Indian School District

=== Oconto County ===
- Gillett School District
- Lena School District
- Oconto Unified School District
- Oconto Falls Public School District
- Suring Public School District

=== Shawano County ===
- Bonduel School District
- Bowler School District
- Gresham School District
- Shawano School District
- Tigerton School District
- Wittenberg-Birnamwood School District

=== Waupaca County ===
- Clintonville School District
- Marion School District

== CESA 9 ==
=== Langlade County ===
- Antigo School District
- Elcho School District

=== Lincoln County ===
- Merrill Area School District
- Tomahawk School District

=== Marathon County ===
- Athens School District
- D C Everest Area School District
- Edgar School District
- Marathon City School District
- Mosinee School District
- Stratford School District
- Wausau School District

=== Oneida County ===
- Lakeland UHS School District
- Minocqua J1 School District
- Rhinelander School District
- Three Lakes School District

=== Price County ===
- Prentice School District

=== Taylor County ===
- Rib Lake School District

=== Vilas County ===
- Lac du Flambeau #1 School District
- North Lakeland School District
- Northland Pines School District
- Phelps School District
- Woodruff J1 School District

== CESA 10 ==
=== Buffalo County ===
- Gilmanton School District
- Mondovi School District

=== Chippewa County ===
- Bloomer School District
- Cadott Community School District
- Chippewa Falls Area Unified School District
- Cornell School District
- Lake Holcombe School District
- New Auburn School District
- Stanley-Boyd Area School District

=== Clark County ===
- Abbotsford School District
- Colby School District
- Granton Area School District
- Greenwood School District
- Loyal School District
- Neillsville School District
- Owen-Withee School District
- Thorp School District

=== Eau Claire County ===
- Altoona School District
- Augusta School District
- Eau Claire Area School District
- Fall Creek School District

=== Marathon County ===
- Spencer School District

=== Rusk County ===
- Bruce School District
- Flambeau School District
- Ladysmith School District

=== Taylor County ===
- Gilman School District
- Medford Area Public School District

=== Trempealeau County ===
- Eleva-Strum School District
- Osseo-Fairchild School District

== CESA 11 ==
=== Barron County ===
- Barron Area School District
- Cameron School District
- Chetek-Weyerhaeuser Area School District
- Cumberland School District
- Prairie Farm Public School District
- Rice Lake Area School District
- Turtle Lake School District

=== Burnett County ===
- Grantsburg School District
- Siren School District
- Webster School District

=== Dunn County ===
- Boyceville Community School District
- Colfax School District
- Elk Mound Area School District
- Menomonie Area School District

=== Pepin County ===
- Durand-Arkansaw School District
- Pepin Area School District

=== Pierce County ===
- Ellsworth Community School District
- Elmwood School District
- Plum City School District
- Prescott School District
- River Falls School District
- Spring Valley School District

=== Polk County ===
- Amery School District
- Clayton School District
- Clear Lake School District
- Frederic School District
- Luck School District
- Osceola School District
- Saint Croix Falls School District
- Unity School District

=== Saint Croix County ===
- Baldwin-Woodville Area School District
- Glenwood City School District
- Hudson School District
- New Richmond School District
- Saint Croix Central School District
- Somerset School District

=== Washburn County ===
- Birchwood School District
- Shell Lake School District
- Spooner School District

== CESA 12 ==
=== Ashland County ===
- Ashland School District
- Butternut School District
- Mellen School District

=== Bayfield County ===
- Bayfield School District
- Drummond Area School District
- South Shore School District
- Washburn School District

=== Douglas County ===
- Maple School District
- Solon Springs School District
- Superior School District

=== Iron County ===
- Hurley School District
- Mercer School District

=== Price County ===
- Chequamegon School District
- Phillips School District

=== Sawyer County ===
- Hayward Community School District
- Winter School District

=== Washburn County ===
- Northwood School District
