= Southwest Wisconsin Activities League =

Wisconsin high school athletic conference

The Southwest Wisconsin Activities League is a high school athletic conference with its membership concentrated in southwestern Wisconsin. Founded in 1925, all league members (past and present) are affiliated with the Wisconsin Interscholastic Athletic Association.

== History ==
=== 1926-1961 ===
Location of Original Southwest Wisconsin Athletic League Members

The Southwest Wisconsin Activities League, originally known as the Southwest Wisconsin Athletic League, was formed in April 1925 by a group of eight small- to medium-sized high schools in southwestern Wisconsin. Its first sanctioned event was a track meet, and the participating schools were Cuba City, Dodgeville, Fennimore, Lancaster, Mineral Point, Monroe, Monticello and Mount Horeb. Platteville joined as the conference's ninth member when it became a participant for the May 1926 track meet. The conference sponsored football and basketball for the 1926-27 school year, and added Darlington to bring the roster to ten schools. Monticello would leave after that season to join with a group of smaller schools in the newly formed State Line League. A year later, Monroe would make its exit from the SWAL to help form the new Southern Six Conference. Conference membership remained at eight until 1935, when Boscobel and Prairie du Chien joined the conference. The SWAL maintained this alignment for the next twenty-six years, until expansion caused the league to undergo its first membership split.

=== 1961-1987 ===
The consolidation of rural school districts in southwestern Wisconsin and the resulting creation of larger high schools coincided with the expansion of the Southwest Wisconsin Athletic League. Two newly created high schools joined the conference in 1961, bringing membership to twelve: Iowa-Grant High School in Livingston and West Grant High School in Patch Grove. Three years later, Muscoda High School and River Valley High School in Spring Green joined, bringing membership to fourteen. In 1967, Muscoda merged with Blue River of the Kickapoo Valley League to form the new Riverdale High School, inheriting their predecessor's affiliation with the SWAL. Membership was also subdivided into North and South Sections that year:

| North Section | South Section |
|---|---|
| Boscobel | Cuba City |
| Fennimore | Darlington |
| Iowa-Grant | Dodgeville |
| Prairie du Chien | Lancaster |
| River Valley | Mineral Point |
| Riverdale | Mount Horeb |
| West Grant | Platteville |

Location of Southwest Wisconsin Athletic League Members (1969-1971)
Location of Southwest Wisconsin Athletic League Members (1971-1987)

West Grant left the conference in 1969 to join the Black Hawk League and were replaced by Viroqua (formerly of the South Central Conference). In 1970, Richland Center High School was accepted for the 1971-72 school year as the SWAL's fifteenth member school. They were placed in the league's North Section, with Iowa-Grant shifting to the South Section to accommodate the expansion:

| North Section | South Section |
|---|---|
| Boscobel | Cuba City |
| Fennimore | Darlington |
| Prairie du Chien | Dodgeville |
| Richland Center | Iowa-Grant |
| River Valley | Lancaster |
| Riverdale | Mineral Point |
| Viroqua | Mount Horeb |
| | Platteville |

The SWAL never competed in this new alignment, though. Soon after Richland Center joined, the schools in the league's South Section left to form the new Southern Eight Conference. The remaining schools in the SWAL's North Section continued as a seven-member circuit for sixteen years.

=== 1987-2005 ===
Location of Southwest Wisconsin Athletic League Members (1987-2005)

In 1987, the Southern Eight Conference merged with the SWAL to create a fourteen-member conference. All original Southern Eight members (with the exception of Mount Horeb, who left the Southern Eight in 1983) rejoined the league, with Southwestern High School in Hazel Green making their SWAL debut. Viroqua also left the SWAL to join the Coulee Conference that year. With conference expansion came subdivision by enrollment into large (Division 1) and small school (Division 2) divisions:

| SWAL Division 1 | SWAL Division 2 |
|---|---|
| Cuba City | Boscobel |
| Dodgeville | Darlington |
| Lancaster | Fennimore |
| Platteville | Iowa-Grant |
| Prairie du Chien | Mineral Point |
| Richland Center | Riverdale |
| River Valley | Southwestern |

With the exception of Cuba City and Boscobel swapping divisions in 2003, this divisional alignment remained intact for the next eighteen years before the SWAL split its membership for a second time.

=== 2005-present ===
In 2005, six members of SWAL Division 1 (Dodgeville, Lancaster, Platteville, Prairie du Chien, Richland Center and River Valley) left the league to form the new Southwest Wisconsin Conference. The original league's name was changed to its current name (the Southwest Wisconsin Activities League) as part of the breakup, and the eight remaining members (Boscobel, Cuba City, Darlington, Fennimore, Iowa-Grant, Mineral Point, Riverdale and Southwestern) have maintained a stable eight-school circuit to the present day.

=== Football (since 2005) ===
Football membership in the Southwest Wisconsin Activities League has mirrored its all-sport membership for most of its history, with the exception of a two-year period where Riverdale played as independents from 1985 to 1986. After the SWC/SWAL split in 2005, the same eight members played as a football conference until the 2016 season, when Riverdale was shifted to the Ridge & Valley Conference to play with schools more in line with its size. Boscobel and Southwestern were moved to the Six Rivers Conference for the 2019 season, and three associate members replaced them: Aquinas (Mississippi Valley), Lancaster (SWC) and Luther (Coulee). That same year, the WIAA and WFCA collaborated to realign Wisconsin's high school football conferences, starting with the 2020 season. The plan for that season was to move Belleville and Parkview/Albany into the SWAL from the Capitol South and Trailways Large to replace Iowa-Grant's exit to the Six Rivers Conference, who would serve as the SWAL's scheduling partner. Because of the COVID-19 pandemic, the SWAL and SWC decided to join forces and their football season to the spring 2021 alternate season approved by the WIAA as an option for schools who didn't want to compete in the regular fall 2020 season. The original realignment was finally implemented for the fall 2021 football season and remained in place for the 2022-2023 competition cycle with the exception of Lancaster's return to the SWC as football members. In 2024, Parkview/Albany was realigned to the Trailways Conference for football, with the Benton/Scales Mound/Shullsburg and Southwestern/East Dubuque cooperative programs joining to take their place. The Abundant Life Christian/St. Ambrose Academy joint program in Madison was also slated to join after a proposed transition to eleven-player football, but backed out before the season started to remain in the eight-player division. New Glarus is set to join the football roster from the Southwest Wisconsin Conference for the 2026-2027 realignment cycle, replacing the exiting Belleville, who will be a member of the Eastern Suburban Conference for football. The SWAL will also enter into a mandatory one-game crossover with the Southwest Wisconsin Conference starting next season.

== List of member schools ==
=== Current full members ===
| School | Location | Affiliation | Enrollment | Mascot | Colors | Joined |
|---|---|---|---|---|---|---|
| Boscobel | Boscobel, WI | Public | 192 | Bulldogs | | 1935 |
| Cuba City | Cuba City, WI | Public | 239 | Cubans | | 1925, 1987 |
| Darlington | Darlington, WI | Public | 254 | Redbirds | | 1926, 1987 |
| Fennimore | Fennimore, WI | Public | 255 | Golden Eagles | | 1925 |
| Iowa-Grant | Livingston, WI | Public | 219 | Panthers | | 1961, 1987 |
| Mineral Point | Mineral Point, WI | Public | 242 | Pointers | | 1925, 1987 |
| Riverdale | Muscoda, WI | Public | 193 | Chieftains | | 1967 |
| Southwestern | Hazel Green, WI | Public | 155 | Wildcats | | 1987 |

=== Current associate members ===
| School | Location | Affiliation | Mascot | Colors | Primary Conference | Sport(s) |
|---|---|---|---|---|---|---|
| Albany | Albany, WI | Public | Comets | | Six Rivers | Boys Cross Country, Girls Cross Country |
| Argyle | Argyle, WI | Public | Orioles | | Six Rivers | Boys Cross Country, (Note: Co-operative with Pecatonica) Girls Cross Country, Boys Golf |
| Barneveld | Barneveld, WI | Public | Golden Eagles | | Six Rivers | Boys Golf |
| New Glarus | New Glarus, WI | Public | Glarner Knights | | Capitol | Football |

=== Current co-operative members ===
| Team | Colors | Host School | Co-operative Members | Sport(s) |
|---|---|---|---|---|
| BSMS Knights | | Benton | Scales Mound (IL), Shullsburg | Football |

=== Former full members ===
| School | Location | Affiliation | Mascot | Colors | Joined | Left | Conference Joined | Current Conference |
|---|---|---|---|---|---|---|---|---|
| Dodgeville | Dodgeville, WI | Public | Dodgers | | 1925, 1987 | 1971, 2005 | Southern Eight, SWC | Southwest Wisconsin |
| Lancaster | Lancaster, WI | Public | Flying Arrows | | 1925, 1987 | 1971, 2005 | Southern Eight, SWC | Southwest Wisconsin |
| Monroe | Monroe, WI | Public | Cheesemakers | | 1925 | 1928 | Southern Six | Rock Valley |
| Monticello | Monticello, WI | Public | Ponies | | 1925 | 1927 | State Line | Six Rivers |
| Mount Horeb | Mount Horeb, WI | Public | Vikings | | 1925 | 1971 | Southern Eight | Badger |
| Muscoda | Muscoda, WI | Public | Indians | | 1964 | 1967 | Closed in 1967 (merged into Riverdale) | |
| Platteville | Platteville, WI | Public | Hillmen | | 1926, 1987 | 1971, 2005 | Southern Eight, SWC | Southwest Wisconsin |
| Prairie du Chien | Prairie du Chien, WI | Public | Blackhawks | | 1935 | 2005 | Southwest Wisconsin | |
| Richland Center | Richland Center, WI | Public | Hornets | | 1971 | 2005 | Southwest Wisconsin | |
| River Valley | Spring Green, WI | Public | Blackhawks | | 1964 | 2005 | Southwest Wisconsin | |
| Viroqua | Viroqua, WI | Public | Blackhawks | | 1969 | 1987 | Coulee | |
| West Grant | Patch Grove, WI | Public | Falcons | | 1961 | 1969 | Black Hawk | Closed in 1995 (merged into River Ridge) |

=== Former football-only members ===
| School | Location | Affiliation | Mascot | Colors | Seasons | Primary Conference |
|---|---|---|---|---|---|---|
| Aquinas | La Crosse, WI | Private (Catholic) | Blugolds | | 2019 | Mississippi Valley |
| Belleville | Belleville, WI | Public | Wildcats | | 2020-2025 | Capitol |
| Lancaster | Lancaster, WI | Public | Flying Arrows | | 2019-2021 | Southwest Wisconsin |
| Luther | Onalaska, WI | Private (Lutheran, WELS) | Knights | | 2019 | Coulee |
| Parkview/ Albany | Orfordville, WI | Public | Vikings | | 2020-2023 | Trailways/Six Rivers |

== Membership timeline ==
=== Full members ===
North Section South Section SWAL Division 1 SWAL Division 2

== Membership map ==
Southwest Wisconsin Activities League
Location of SWAL full members:
1 Boscobel
2 Cuba City
3 Darlington
4 Fennimore
5 Iowa-Grant
6 Mineral Point
7 Riverdale
8 Southwestern

== Sponsored sports ==
| | Baseball | Boys Basketball | Girls Basketball | Boys Cross Country | Girls Cross Country | Football | Boys Golf | Softball | Boys Track & Field | Girls Track & Field | Girls Volleyball | Boys Wrestling (Note: Co-sponsored with the Southwest Wisconsin Conference) | Girls Wrestling |
|---|---|---|---|---|---|---|---|---|---|---|---|---|---|
| Boscobel | ● | ● | ● | ● | ● | | | ● | ● | ● | ● | ● (Note: Co-operative with Wauzeka-Steuben) | ● |
| Cuba City | ● | ● | ● | ● | ● | ● | ● (Note: Co-operative with Benton and Southwestern) | ● | ● | ● | ● | ● | ● |
| Darlington | ● | ● | ● | ● | ● | ● | ● | ● | ● | ● | ● | ● | ● |
| Fennimore | ● | ● | ● | ● | ● | ● | ● | ● | ● | ● | ● | ● | ● |
| Iowa-Grant | ● (Note: Co-operative with Highland) | ● | ● | ● | ● | | ● | ● | ● | ● | ● | ● | ● |
| Mineral Point | ● | ● | ● | | | ● | ● | ● | | | ● | ● | ● |
| Riverdale | ● | ● | ● | ● | ● | | | | ● | ● | ● | ● | ● |
| Southwestern | ● | ● | ● | ● (Note: Co-operative with Benton) | ● | ● (Note: Co-operative with East Dubuque (IL)) | ● | ● | ● | ● | ● | | |

== List of state champions ==
=== Fall sports ===
Boys Cross Country
| School | Year | Division |
|---|---|---|
| Dodgeville | 1967 | Small Schools |
| Fennimore | 1974 | Class C |
| Fennimore | 1977 | Class C |
| Fennimore | 1978 | Class C |
| Fennimore | 1979 | Class C |
| Fennimore | 1980 | Class C |
| Fennimore | 1981 | Class C |
| Fennimore | 1991 | Division 3 |
| Iowa-Grant | 2000 | Division 3 |
| Boscobel | 2003 | Division 3 |
| Darlington | 2011 | Division 3 |
| Darlington | 2012 | Division 3 |
| Darlington | 2013 | Division 3 |
| Darlington | 2014 | Division 3 |
| Darlington | 2015 | Division 3 |
| Darlington | 2016 | Division 3 |

Girls Cross Country
| School | Year | Division |
|---|---|---|
| Prairie du Chien | 1975 | Single Division |
| Fennimore | 1980 | Class C |
| Fennimore | 1981 | Class C |
| Fennimore | 1981 | Class C |
| Cuba City/ Southwestern | 1997 | Division 2 |
| Fennimore | 2001 | Division 3 |
| Boscobel | 2002 | Division 3 |
| Boscobel | 2004 | Division 3 |
| Dodgeville/ Mineral Point | 2005 | Division 2 |
| Dodgeville/ Mineral Point | 2006 | Division 2 |
| Boscobel | 2007 | Division 3 |
| Dodgeville/ Mineral Point | 2010 | Division 2 |
| Dodgeville/ Mineral Point | 2011 | Division 2 |
| Dodgeville/ Mineral Point | 2012 | Division 2 |
| Darlington | 2016 | Division 2 |
| Boscobel | 2021 | Division 3 |
| Dodgeville/ Mineral Point | 2021 | Division 2 |

Football
| School | Year | Division |
|---|---|---|
| Darlington | 1987 | Division 5 |
| Darlington | 1990 | Division 5 |
| Darlington | 1991 | Division 5 |
| Lancaster | 1993 | Division 4 |
| Darlington | 1995 | Division 4 |
| Lancaster | 2000 | Division 4 |
| Lancaster | 2001 | Division 4 |
| Lancaster | 2002 | Division 4 |

Girls Volleyball
| School | Year | Division |
|---|---|---|
| Richland Center | 1987 | Class B |
| Iowa-Grant | 1989 | Class C |
| Platteville | 1994 | Division 2 |
| Dodgeville | 1995 | Division 3 |
| Dodgeville | 1996 | Division 3 |
| Iowa-Grant | 1997 | Division 3 |
| Dodgeville | 1999 | Division 3 |

=== Winter sports ===
Boys Basketball
| School | Year | Division |
|---|---|---|
| Dodgeville | 1964 | Single Division |
| Darlington | 1990 | Class C |
| Cuba City | 1991 | Division 3 |
| Cuba City | 1998 | Division 3 |
| Mineral Point | 2024 | Division 4 |

Girls Basketball
| School | Year | Division |
|---|---|---|
| Cuba City | 1990 | Class B |
| Cuba City | 1991 | Division 3 |
| Prairie du Chien | 1991 | Division 2 |
| Cuba City | 1993 | Division 3 |
| Cuba City | 2005 | Division 3 |
| Cuba City | 2006 | Division 3 |
| Cuba City | 2007 | Division 3 |
| Cuba City | 2010 | Division 3 |
| Cuba City | 2014 | Division 4 |
| Cuba City | 2015 | Division 4 |
| Mineral Point | 2016 | Division 4 |
| Mineral Point | 2022 | Division 4 |
| Cuba City | 2025 | Division 4 |

Gymnastics
| School | Year | Division |
|---|---|---|
| Platteville/ Belmont | 1994 | Division 2 |
| Cuba City/ Southwestern | 1995 | Division 2 |
| Cuba City/ Southwestern | 1996 | Division 2 |
| Cuba City/ Southwestern | 1999 | Division 2 |
| Cuba City/ Southwestern | 2000 | Division 2 |

Boys Wrestling
| School | Year | Division |
|---|---|---|
| River Valley | 1982 | Class B |
| River Valley | 1984 | Class B |
| River Valley | 1989 | Class B |
| Lancaster | 1990 | Class B |
| Riverdale | 1990 | Class C |
| Riverdale | 1992 | Class C |
| Riverdale | 1997 | Division 3 |
| Mineral Point | 2002 | Division 3 |
| Mineral Point | 2003 | Division 3 |
| Iowa-Grant | 2004 | Division 3 |
| Mineral Point | 2007 | Division 3 |
| Mineral Point | 2008 | Division 3 |
| Mineral Point | 2009 | Division 3 |
| Fennimore | 2016 | Division 3 |
| Fennimore | 2019 | Division 3 |
| Mineral Point | 2021 | Division 3 |
| Fennimore | 2022 | Division 3 |
| Fennimore | 2023 | Division 3 |
| Fennimore | 2024 | Division 3 |
| Mineral Point | 2025 | Division 3 |

=== Spring sports ===
Baseball
| School | Year | Division |
|---|---|---|
| Boscobel | 1987 | Class C |
| Prairie du Chien | 1993 | Division 2 |
| Cuba City | 2022 | Division 3 |

Boys Golf
| School | Year | Division |
|---|---|---|
| River Valley | 1997 | Division 2 |
| Cuba City | 2012 | Division 3 |
| Mineral Point | 2024 | Division 3 |

Softball
| School | Year | Division |
|---|---|---|
| River Valley | 1985 | Class B |
| River Valley | 1986 | Class B |
| Mineral Point | 2013 | Division 3 |
| Dodgeville | 2021 | Division 3 |
| Mineral Point | 2026 | Division 4 |

Boys Track & Field
| School | Year | Division |
|---|---|---|
| Platteville | 1929 | Class B |
| Platteville | 1957 | Class B |
| Mineral Point | 1961 | Class C |
| Mineral Point | 1962 | Class C |
| Platteville | 1988 | Class B |
| Boscobel | 1989 | Class C |
| Platteville | 1989 | Class B |
| Lancaster/ Potosi | 1998 | Division 2 |
| Fennimore | 2009 | Division 3 |

Girls Track & Field
| School | Year | Division |
|---|---|---|
| Prairie du Chien | 1975 | Class B |
| Prairie du Chien | 1976 | Class B |
| Prairie du Chien | 1977 | Class B |
| Prairie du Chien | 1978 | Class B |
| Richland Center | 1983 | Class B |
| Dodgeville/ Mineral Point | 2015 | Division 2 |

=== Summer Sports ===
Baseball
| School | Year | Division |
|---|---|---|
| Platteville | 1967 | Single Division |

== List of conference champions ==
=== Boys Basketball ===
| School | Quantity | Years |
|---|---|---|
| Cuba City | 23 | 1929, 1938, 1949, 1953, 1957, 1989, 1990, 1991, 1992, 1993, 1995, 1998, 1999, 2004, 2007, 2008, 2009, 2010, 2011, 2012, 2013, 2020, 2022 |
| Platteville | 22 | 1927, 1919, 1930, 1931, 1932, 1937, 1939, 1942, 1943, 1944, 1945, 1946, 1950, 1954, 1955, 1956, 1961, 1965, 1966, 1967, 1968, 1997 |
| Prairie du Chien | 16 | 1938, 1942, 1944, 1945, 1947, 1948, 1975, 1976, 1977, 1978, 1981, 1986, 1987, 2000, 2001, 2002 |
| Mineral Point | 15 | 1934, 1935, 1941, 1988, 1991, 1992, 1999, 2000, 2003, 2014, 2015, 2018, 2022, 2024, 2025 |
| Darlington | 14 | 1960, 1961, 1990, 1994, 1996, 2005, 2010, 2011, 2017, 2019, 2021, 2023, 2024, 2026 |
| Dodgeville | 14 | 1940, 1947, 1952, 1958, 1959, 1963, 1964, 1968, 1969, 1993, 1994, 2003, 2004, 2005 |
| Fennimore | 9 | 1935, 1951, 1987, 1992, 1993, 1997, 1998, 2002, 2006 |
| Richland Center | 6 | 1973, 1974, 1979, 1980, 1984, 1996 |
| Iowa-Grant | 4 | 1969, 1989, 1995, 2016 |
| Lancaster | 4 | 1932, 1962, 1966, 1988 |
| Mount Horeb | 4 | 1928, 1933, 1936, 1958 |
| Viroqua | 4 | 1972, 1982, 1983, 1985 |
| Boscobel | 3 | 1941, 1999, 2000 |
| Southwestern | 2 | 2000, 2001 |
| River Valley | 1 | 1970 |
| Riverdale | 1 | 1971 |
| Monroe | 0 | |
| Monticello | 0 | |
| Muscoda | 0 | |
| West Grant | 0 | |

=== Girls Basketball ===
| School | Quantity | Years |
|---|---|---|
| Cuba City | 27 | 1988, 1989, 1990, 1991, 1992, 1993, 1996, 1997, 1998, 1999, 2004, 2005, 2006, 2007, 2008, 2009, 2010, 2012, 2013, 2014, 2015, 2017, 2020, 2023, 2024, 2025, 2026 |
| Mineral Point | 15 | 1989, 1992, 1993, 1994, 1997, 1999, 2003, 2016, 2017, 2019, 2020, 2021, 2022, 2025, 2026 |
| Prairie du Chien | 9 | 1978, 1981, 1983, 1985, 1986, 1994, 1995, 1998, 1999 |
| Richland Center | 9 | 1984, 1987, 1996, 2000, 2001, 2002, 2003, 2004, 2005 |
| Fennimore | 6 | 1980, 1981, 1991, 1992, 2011, 2012 |
| Darlington | 5 | 1998, 1999, 2000, 2001, 2018 |
| Southwestern | 4 | 1990, 1994, 1996, 2002 |
| Iowa-Grant | 2 | 1988, 1995 |
| Boscobel | 1 | 1988 |
| Lancaster | 1 | 2005 |
| River Valley | 1 | 1986 |
| Riverdale | 1 | 1982 |
| Viroqua | 1 | 1979 |
| Dodgeville | 0 | |
| Platteville | 0 | |

=== Football ===
| School | Quantity | Years |
|---|---|---|
| Darlington | 40 | 1929, 1932, 1933, 1946, 1949, 1950, 1951, 1952, 1956, 1957, 1958, 1960, 1962, 1970, 1987, 1989, 1990, 1994, 1995, 1996, 1997, 1998, 1999, 2000, 2001, 2002, 2004, 2005, 2009, 2010, 2011, 2013, 2014, 2015, 2016, 2021, 2022, 2023, 2025, 2026 |
| Platteville | 19 | 1927, 1928, 1933, 1936, 1938, 1939, 1942, 1943, 1944, 1964, 1967, 1969, 1987, 1992, 1993, 1994, 1995, 1996, 2004 |
| Prairie du Chien | 17 | 1935, 1940, 1941, 1947, 1961, 1971, 1973, 1975, 1976, 1977, 1978, 1979, 1981, 1983, 1984, 1985, 1988 |
| Lancaster | 16 | 1926, 1930, 1931, 1937, 1947, 1948, 1953, 1965, 1989, 1990, 1994, 1997, 1999, 2000, 2001, 2002 |
| Cuba City | 10 | 1935, 1959, 1961, 1998, 2003, 2007, 2009, 2012, 2017, 2024 |
| Dodgeville | 5 | 1934, 1951, 1958, 1963, 2003 |
| Fennimore | 7 | 1928, 1970, 1972, 1982, 1992, 2006, 2008 |
| Mineral Point | 6 | 1934, 1967, 1991, 2017, 2018, 2019 |
| River Valley | 5 | 1966, 1973, 1979, 1980, 1981 |
| Boscobel | 4 | 1940, 1954, 1955, 1968 |
| Iowa-Grant | 4 | 1988, 1993, 2005, 2009 |
| Richland Center | 4 | 1974, 1986, 1990, 1991 |
| Mount Horeb | 3 | 1945, 1948, 1966 |
| Viroqua | 3 | 1974, 1975, 1979 |
| Southwestern | 1 | 2006 |
| Aquinas | 0 | |
| Belleville | 0 | |
| Benton/ Scales Mound/ Shullsburg | 0 | |
| Luther | 0 | |
| Monroe | 0 | |
| Monticello | 0 | |
| Muscoda | 0 | |
| New Glarus | 0 | |
| Parkview/ Albany | 0 | |
| Riverdale | 0 | |
| West Grant | 0 | |
| Southwestern/ East Dubuque | 0 | |
