= Southern Eight Conference =

Wisconsin high school athletic conference (1971-1987)

The Southern Eight Conference is a former high school athletic conference in southwestern Wisconsin, operating from 1971 to 1987. All member schools belonged to the Wisconsin Interscholastic Athletic Association.

== History ==
Location of Original Southern Eight Conference Members

The Southern Eight Conference was formed as the result of a split of member schools in the Southwest Wisconsin Athletic League. In 1970, Richland Center High School was accepted as the fifteenth member of the SWAL (effective 1971) and was added to the seven-member North Section. Soon after their acceptance, the other eight schools in the South Section voted to split the conference along geographic lines to maintain traditional rivalries and cut transportation expenses. The Southern Eight began competition in 1971, and its membership roster was remarkably stable over the course of its history. The only changes happened in 1983 with Mount Horeb's exit to the Capitol Conference and the addition of Southwestern High School in Hazel Green. The end of the Southern Eight Conference came in 1987, when the conference remerged with the Southwest Wisconsin Athletic League to create a new fourteen-member conference subdivided by enrollment size.

== Conference membership history ==
=== Final members ===
School	Location	Affiliation	Mascot	Colors	Joined	Left	Conference Joined	Current Conference
Cuba City	Cuba City, WI	Public	Cubans		1971	1987	Southwest Wisconsin Activities League	
Darlington	Darlington, WI	Public	Redbirds		1971	1987	Southwest Wisconsin Activities League	
Dodgeville	Dodgeville, WI	Public	Dodgers		1971	1987	SWAL	Southwest Wisconsin
Iowa-Grant	Livingston, WI	Public	Panthers		1971	1987	Southwest Wisconsin Activities League	
Lancaster	Lancaster, WI	Public	Flying Arrows		1971	1987	SWAL	Southwest Wisconsin
Mineral Point	Mineral Point, WI	Public	Pointers		1971	1987	Southwest Wisconsin Activities League	
Platteville	Platteville, WI	Public	Hillmen		1971	1987	SWAL	Southwest Wisconsin
Southwestern	Hazel Green, WI	Public	Wildcats		1983	1987	Southwest Wisconsin Activities League	

=== Previous members ===
School	Location	Affiliation	Mascot	Colors	Joined	Left	Conference Joined	Current Conference
Mount Horeb	Mount Horeb, WI	Public	Vikings		1971	1983	Capitol	Badger

== List of state champions ==
=== Fall sports ===
Boys Cross Country
School	Year	Division
Dodgeville	1972	Small Schools
Platteville	1979	Class B
Platteville	1980	Class B
Mount Horeb	1981	Class B
Platteville	1984	Class B
Darlington	1985	Class C
Darlington	1986	Class C

Football
School	Year	Division
Iowa-Grant	1977	Division 3
Platteville	1984	Division 4

Girls Volleyball
School	Year	Division
Platteville	1977	Class B
Iowa-Grant	1978	Class C
Platteville	1979	Class B

=== Winter sports ===
Boys Basketball
School	Year	Division
Cuba City	1981	Class B
Iowa-Grant	1981	Class C

Girls Basketball
School	Year	Division
Lancaster	1976	Class B
Cuba City	1977	Class B
Lancaster	1979	Class B
Cuba City	1980	Class B
Platteville	1984	Class B

Gymnastics
School	Year	Division
Mount Horeb	1978	Class B
Mount Horeb	1983	Class B

Boys Wrestling
School	Year	Division
Mineral Point	1980	Class C
Mineral Point	1981	Class C
Mineral Point	1982	Class C
Mineral Point	1983	Class C
Mineral Point	1985	Class C
Mineral Point	1986	Class C

=== Spring sports ===
None

== List of conference champions ==
=== Boys Basketball ===
School	Quantity	Years
Cuba City	10	1972, 1975, 1976, 1977, 1980, 1981, 1983, 1985, 1986, 1987
Platteville	4	1979, 1984, 1985, 1986
Dodgeville	2	1973, 1978
Iowa-Grant	1	1982
Mineral Point	1	1974
Darlington	0	
Lancaster	0	
Mount Horeb	0	
Southwestern	0	

=== Girls Basketball ===
School	Quantity	Years
Cuba City	6	1977, 1978, 1980, 1981, 1982, 1985
Lancaster	3	1976, 1979, 1983
Platteville	1	1984
Southwestern	1	1986
Darlington	0	
Dodgeville	0	
Iowa-Grant	0	
Mineral Point	0	
Mount Horeb	0	
Champions from 1987 unknown

=== Football ===
School	Quantity	Years
Platteville	7	1971, 1972, 1980, 1982, 1983, 1984, 1985
Iowa-Grant	5	1974, 1975, 1976, 1977, 1979
Cuba City	2	1975, 1981
Darlington	1	1973
Dodgeville	1	1986
Lancaster	1	1971
Mount Horeb	1	1978
Mineral Point	0	
Southwestern	0	
