= Southwest Wisconsin Conference =

Wisconsin high school athletic conference

The Southwest Wisconsin Conference is a high school athletic conference in Wisconsin's Driftless Area. Comprising the six largest high schools in the southwest corner of the state, the conference was founded in 2005 and is affiliated with the Wisconsin Interscholastic Athletic Association.

== History ==
The Southwest Wisconsin Conference was formed from a membership split in the Southwest Wisconsin Athletic League. Since 1987, the SWAL had consisted of fourteen schools in two divisions subdivided by membership size. Division I consisted of the larger schools, and the smaller schools made up Division II. This divisional alignment remained intact for the next sixteen years until 2003. Cuba City, the smallest school in the SWAL Division I, sought to switch divisions and join with smaller schools in the SWAL Division II. Boscobel, the largest school in Division II, resisted the move and the two factions continued to seek a solution. In 2004, a realignment agreement was reached that would place Boscobel back in an eight-member SWAL Division II, with the remaining six schools comprising Division I. Instead, the six remaining schools (Dodgeville, Lancaster, Platteville, Prairie du Chien, Richland Center and River Valley) left the SWAL to form the Southwest Wisconsin Conference, commencing play in the 2005-06 school year. After two-plus decades at six members, the Southwest Wisconsin Conference will be expanding to seven schools for the 2027-28 school year with Viroqua's shift from the Coulee Conference.

=== Football ===
For the first fourteen seasons of the Southwest Wisconsin Conference, the six members that comprised its all-sport lineup also made up its football roster. During this period, Lancaster was a dominant force in the sport, winning eleven conference championships and three state titles. To achieve greater parity among conference members, Lancaster was moved to the Southwest Wisconsin Activities League as a football-only member for the 2019 season and were replaced by three schools from the Coulee Conference: Arcadia, Viroqua and Westby. This would only last for one season, as the Wisconsin Football Coaches Association and the WIAA collaborated on a football-only realignment to begin with the 2020 football season and run on a two-year cycle. The three Coulee Conference members returned to that conference, with Brodhead/Juda of the Rock Valley Conference and New Glarus/Monticello of the Capitol Conference entering as their replacements. The SWC also entered into a scheduling alliance with the South Central Conference as part of the realignment. However, the SWC instead joined forces with the SWAL to play their football season in the spring 2021 alternate season due to the COVID-19 pandemic with the new alignment taking effect for the fall 2021 season. In 2022, Lancaster made their return to the SWC, replacing New Glarus/Monticello after their return to the Capitol Conference. For the current 2024-2025 realignment cycle, New Glarus returned to the SWC to bring football membership to eight schools and nullify the South Central Conference scheduling agreement. The Southwest Wisconsin Conference will go back to seven football members in 2026 when New Glarus moves over to the SWAL, and the SWC and will enter into a scheduling alliance with the SWAL for one mandatory crossover conference game per season.

== List of member schools ==
=== Current full members ===
School	Location	Affiliation	Enrollment	Mascot	Colors	Joined
Dodgeville	Dodgeville, WI	Public	358	Dodgers		2005
Lancaster	Lancaster, WI	Public	301	Flying Arrows		2005
Platteville	Platteville, WI	Public	434	Hillmen		2005
Prairie du Chien	Prairie du Chien, WI	Public	252	Blackhawks		2005
Richland Center	Richland Center, WI	Public	409	Hornets		2005
River Valley	Spring Green, WI	Public	344	Blackhawks		2005

=== Current associate members ===
School	Location	Affiliation	Mascot	Colors	Primary Conference	Sport(s)
Belmont	Belmont, WI	Public	Braves		Six Rivers	Boys Wrestling, (Note: Co-operative with Platteville) Girls Wrestling
Brodhead/Juda	Brodhead, WI	Public	Cardinals		Rock Valley/Six Rivers	Football
Darlington	Darlington, WI	Public	Redbirds		SWAL	Girls Golf
Southwestern	Hazel Green, WI	Public	Wildcats		SWAL	Girls Golf, Gymnastics
Wisconsin Dells	Wisconsin Dells, WI	Public	Chiefs		South Central	Girls Golf

=== Future full members ===
School	Location	Affiliation	Enrollment	Mascot	Colors	Joining	Former Conference
Viroqua	Viroqua, WI	Public	346	Blackhawks		2027	Coulee

=== Former football-only members ===
School	Location	Affiliation	Mascot	Colors	Seasons	Primary Conference
Arcadia	Arcadia, WI	Public	Raiders		2019	Coulee
New Glarus	New Glarus, WI	Public	Glarner Knights		2024-2025	Capitol
New Glarus/Monticello	New Glarus, WI	Public	Glarner Knights		2020-2021	Capitol/Six Rivers
Viroqua	Viroqua, WI	Public	Blackhawks		2019	Coulee
Westby	Westby, WI	Public	Norsemen		2019	Coulee

== Membership map ==
Southwest Wisconsin Conference
Location of Southwest Wisconsin Conference full members:
1 Dodgeville
2 Lancaster
3 Platteville
4 Prairie du Chien
5 Richland Center
6 River Valley

== Sponsored sports ==
	Baseball	Boys Basketball	Girls Basketball	Boys Cross Country	Girls Cross Country	Football	Boys Golf	Girls Golf	Gymnastics	Boys Soccer	Girls Soccer	Softball	Boys Track & Field	Girls Track & Field	Girls Volleyball	Boys Wrestling (Note: Co-sponsored with the Southwest Wisconsin Activities League)	Girls Wrestling
Dodgeville	●	●	●	● (Note: Co-operative with Mineral Point)	●	●	●		● (Note: Co-operative with Highland, Iowa-Grant and Mineral Point)	●	●	●	●	●	●	●	●
Lancaster	●	●	●	●	●	●	●	●				●	●	●	●	●	●
Platteville	●	●	●	●	●	●	●		● (Note: Co-operative with Belmont and Lancaster)	● (Note: Co-operative with Lancaster)	●	●	●	●	●		
Prairie du Chien	●	●	●	●	●	●	●	●		● (Note: Co-operative with Seneca, Wauzeka-Steuben and Youth Initiative)	●	●	●	●	●	●	●
Richland Center	●	●	●	● (Note: Co-operative with Ithaca)	●	●	●			●	●	●	●	●	●	●	●
River Valley	●	●	●	●	●	●	●		● (Note: Co-operative with Barneveld)	●	●	●	●	●	●	●	●

== List of state champions ==
=== Fall sports ===
Girls Cross Country
School	Year	Division
Dodgeville/ Mineral Point	2005	Division 2
Dodgeville/ Mineral Point	2006	Division 2
Dodgeville/ Mineral Point	2010	Division 2
Dodgeville/ Mineral Point	2011	Division 2
Dodgeville/ Mineral Point	2012	Division 2
Lancaster	2018	Division 3
Lancaster	2020	Division 3
Dodgeville/ Mineral Point	2021	Division 2
Lancaster	2023	Division 3

Football
School	Year	Division
Lancaster	2005	Division 5
Lancaster	2006	Division 5
Lancaster	2014	Division 5

=== Winter sports ===
Gymnastics
School	Year	Division
Dodgeville	2026	Division 2

Boys Wrestling
School	Year	Division
Lancaster	2013	Division 3

=== Spring sports ===
Boys Golf
School	Year	Division
Lancaster	2014	Division 3

Softball
School	Year	Division
Dodgeville	2021	Division 3

Boys Track & Field
School	Year	Division
Richland Center	2007	Division2

Girls Track & Field
School	Year	Division
Dodgeville/ Mineral Point	2015	Division 2

== List of conference champions ==
=== Boys Basketball ===
School	Quantity	Years
Prairie du Chien	7	2007, 2010, 2011, 2012, 2016, 2017, 2019
Platteville	6	2018, 2019, 2023, 2024, 2025, 2026
River Valley	6	2007, 2008, 2009, 2010, 2013, 2020
Dodgeville	5	2013, 2015, 2022, 2023, 2026
Richland Center	4	2006, 2013, 2014, 2021
Lancaster	1	2026

=== Girls Basketball ===
School	Quantity	Years
Platteville	7	2013, 2016, 2017, 2020, 2024, 2025, 2026
Prairie du Chien	6	2019, 2021, 2022, 2023, 2024, 2025
Richland Center	6	2007, 2008, 2009, 2010, 2011, 2012
Dodgeville	3	2014, 2015, 2018
Lancaster	2	2006, 2026
River Valley	0	

=== Football ===
School	Quantity	Years
Lancaster	11	2005, 2006, 2007, 2008, 2009, 2011, 2012, 2013, 2014, 2016, 2017
Platteville	5	2006, 2016, 2017, 2023, 2026
Prairie du Chien	5	2015, 2018, 2022, 2024, 2025
River Valley	5	2010, 2015, 2016, 2019, 2020
Brodhead/ Juda	1	2021
New Glarus	1	2025
Arcadia	0	
Dodgeville	0	
Richland Center	0	
New Glarus/ Monticello	0	
Viroqua	0	
Westby	0	
