= Keith Krepfle =

American football player (born 1952)

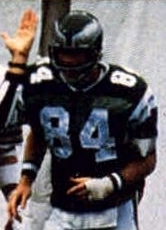
- Krepfle with the Philadelphia Eagles in 1977

No. 84, 88
- Position: Tight end

Personal information
- Born: February 4, 1952 (age 74); Dubuque, Iowa, U.S.
- Listed height: 6 ft 3 in (1.91 m)
- Listed weight: 227 lb (103 kg)

Career information
- High school: Potosi
- College: Iowa State
- NFL draft: 1974: 5th round, 115th overall pick

Career history
- Jacksonville Sharks (1974); Philadelphia Eagles (1975–1981); Atlanta Falcons (1982)

Awards and highlights
- First-team All-Big Eight (1972); Second-team All-Big Eight (1973)

Career NFL statistics
- Receptions: 152
- Receiving yards: 2,425
- Receiving touchdowns: 19
- Stats at Pro Football Reference

Keith Robert Krepfle (born February 4, 1952) is an American former professional football player who was a tight end for eight seasons in the National Football League (NFL) for the Philadelphia Eagles and Atlanta Falcons. He played college football for the Iowa State Cyclones.

== College career ==
During his three-year career at Iowa State, Krepfle dominated the Big Eight. He hauled in 94 passes for 1,368 yards and 15 touchdowns in addition to playing in two bowl games. His inaugural Cyclone season Krepfle led the team to their first ever bowl game, the 1971 Sun Bowl. The next season, Keith would again lead the Cyclones to a bowl berth with the 1972 Liberty Bowl. Krepfle's best collegiate game was against #3 Nebraska during the 1972 season in which he caught two touchdowns.

While at Iowa State, Keith was a member of the fraternity Tau Kappa Epsilon.

In 2002 he was inducted into the Iowa State Cyclones Hall of Fame.

== Professional career ==
Despite being drafted 115th overall in the fifth round of the 1974 NFL draft by the Philadelphia Eagles, Krepfle chose to sign with the Jacksonville Sharks of the World Football League. All-pro tight end Charle Young was already entrenched with the Eagles and the Sharks offered Krepfle a guaranteed contract. Just 14 games into the season the Sharks went bankrupt and the team folded. The following season Krepfle signed a contract with the Eagles to play in the NFL.

After limited playing time his first two seasons with the Eagles, Charle Young was traded to the Los Angeles Rams for QB Ron Jaworski prior to the 1977 season. This created an opening for Krepfle to shine. As a full-time starter for the Eagles, Krepfle would have over 150 catches for nearly 2,500 yards and 19 touchdowns. Keith became the first Eagle to ever catch a touch down in the Super Bowl during their appearance in Super Bowl XV.

Following seven seasons with the Eagles, Krepfle played one additional season with the Atlanta Falcons.

=== Statistics ===
Regular season

Year	Team	G	GS	Receiving				
Year	Team	G	GS	Rec	Yds	Avg	Lng	TD
1974	SHA	14	14	6	80	13.3	30	0
1975	PHI	14	0	1	16	16.0	16	0
1976	PHI	10	1	6	80	13.3	30	1
1977	PHI	14	14	27	530	19.6	55	3
1978	PHI	10	10	26	374	14.4	34	3
1979	PHI	16	16	41	760	18.5	45	3
1980	PHI	13	11	30	450	15.0	27	4
1981	PHI	16	16	20	210	10.5	26	5
1982	ATL	4	0	1	5	5.0	5	0
Total		111	82	158	2,505	15.8	55	19

Playoffs season

Year	Team	G	GS	Receiving				
Year	Team	G	GS	Rec	Yds	Avg	Lng	TD
1979	PHI	2	2	3	23	7.7	12	0
1980	PHI	3	3	6	65	10.8	20	1
1981	PHI	1	1	1	18	18.0	18	0
1982	ATL	1	1	1	18	18.0	18	0
Total		7	7	11	124	11.3	20	1

== Post-NFL career ==
After his NFL career, Krepfle embarked on a career in the health care industry, working for large pharmaceutical companies such as Novartis, Bristol Myers Squibb and Delta Pharma before starting his own company. Today he lives in the Poconos in Pennsylvania.
