= Golden Years of Walworth =

Retirement community in Walworth, Wisconsin, United States

Coordinates: 42°31′42″N 88°35′03″W

Golden Years Nursing Home, Inc.
- Company type: Privately Held Company
- Industry: Healthcare
- Founded: 1960
- Headquarters: Walworth, Wisconsin, USA
- Key people: Rich Austin (Owner, Executive Director)
- Products: Nursing Home, Assisted living, Independent Living, Rehabilitation Services
- Number of employees: 96
- Website: www.goldenyearsofwalworth.com

Golden Years of Walworth is a Continuing Care Retirement Community located in Walworth, Wisconsin. It is one of only two communities in Walworth County, Wisconsin that provides assisted living, independent living and nursing home care all on one campus. Though Medicare (United States) certified, it is the only nursing home in Walworth County that is not part of the Medicaid funding program.

== History ==
Vic Carbrey began building the Golden Years of Walworth in 1960 at the age of 80. He finished in 1965 and the building was opened as an intermediate care facility with a 26-bed capacity. In 1969, Carbrey sold the facility to Eugene and Margaret Austin. In 1980, their son, Rich Austin, purchased the facility with his wife, Linda, and they currently continue to own and operate the Golden Years of Walworth as a privately held company.

Golden Years of Walworth added 30 independent living units in 1984, and five years later, increased the number of units to 54. In 1993, they added a skilled nursing wing to accommodate 26 beds. Currently, the Golden Years of Walworth has 60 units for independent living, 27 for assisted living and 28 beds for Medicare certified skilled nursing care.

== Notes and awards ==
Golden Years was voted the 2010, 2011, 2012, and 2013 Best Retirement Facility in Walworth County by a Walworth County Gazette poll.

Listed as a 2014 "Best Nursing Home" by U.S. News & World Report.

Listed as a 2013 "Best Nursing Home" by U.S. News & World Report.

Golden Years was listed in 2010–2011 as one of the Best Nursing Homes in Wisconsin according to US News rankings.
