= River Valley High School (Wisconsin) =

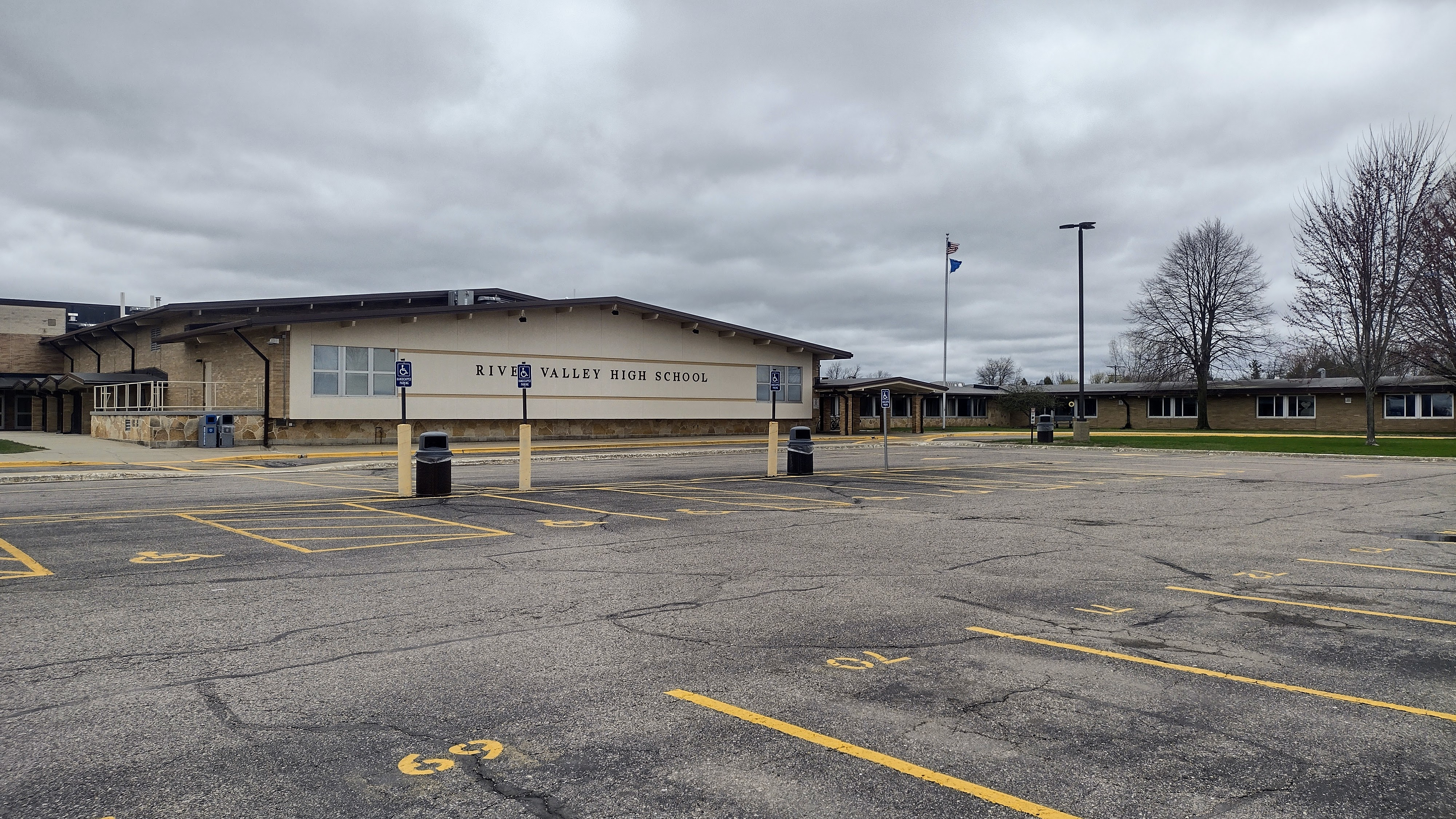

Location
- 660 Varsity Boulevard; Spring Green, Wisconsin 53588; United States
- 43.1811°N 90.0766°W

Information
- School district: River Valley School District
- Superintendent: Loren Glasbrenner
- Principal: Darby Blakley
- Teaching staff: 29.63 (FTE)
- Grades: 9-12
- Gender: Co-ed
- Enrollment: 376 (2023-2024)
- Student to teacher ratio: 12.69
- Website: https://highschool.rvschools.org/

River Valley High School is a public high school located in Spring Green, Wisconsin, and is a part of the River Valley School District. It serves more than 350 students in grades 9-12 from Spring Green, Lone Rock, Plain, Arena and the surrounding rural area.

== Athletics ==
River Valley is in the Southwest Wisconsin Conference. Athletics offered include:

Boys'	Girls'
Baseball	Softball
Basketball	Basketball
Football	Volleyball
Soccer	Soccer
Wrestling	

=== Athletic conference affiliation history ===
- Tri-County League (1962–1963)
- Madison Suburban Conference (1963–1964)
- Southwest Wisconsin Athletic League (1964–2005)
- Southwest Wisconsin Conference (2005–present)

== Notable alumni ==
- Brandon Gilbeck
- Carie Graves
- Sondy Pope
- Anthony Weston
- Shawn Eichorst
