= Platteville School District =

School district in Wisconsin, United States

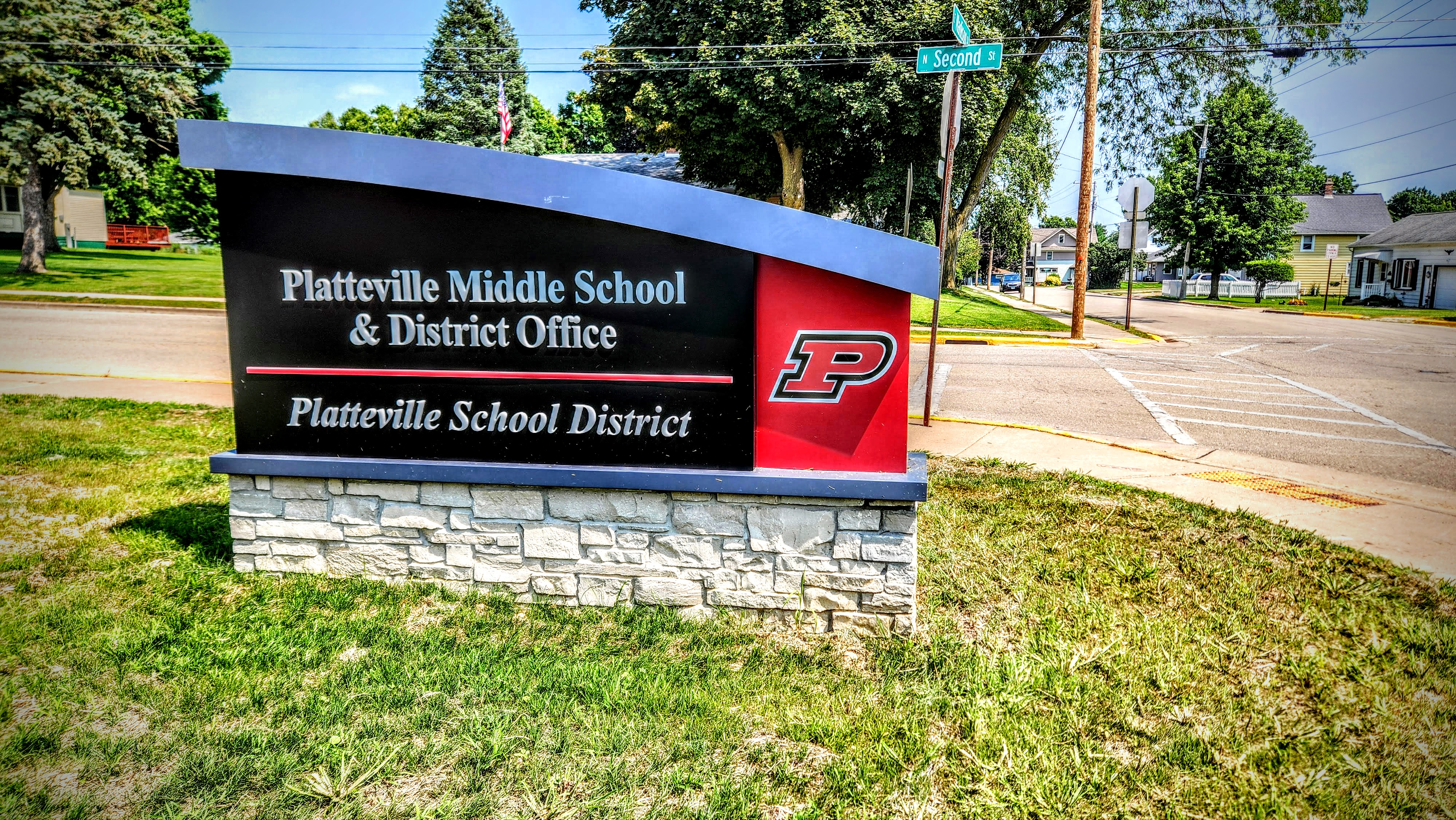

Location
- 780 North Second Street; Platteville, WI 53818 Grant County, Wisconsin United States

District information
- Type: Public School District
- Motto: “Where tomorrow's leaders learn today.”
- Grades: PK–12
- Superintendent: Jim Boebel
- Schools: 4
- Budget: ≈$28,484,000 (2022–233)
- NCES District ID: 5511850

Students and staff
- Students: 1,544 (2024–25)
- Teachers: 115.15 (on an FTE basis)
- Staff: 221
- Athletic conference: Southwest Wisconsin Conference
- Colors: Cardinal & White

Other information
- Website: www.platteville.k12.wi.us

The Platteville School District is located in the city of Platteville, Grant County in southwestern Wisconsin. The district operates four schools - two elementary schools, one middle school, and one high school. It is the largest school district in Grant County.

The two elementary schools, Neal Wilkins Early Learning Center and Westview Elementary School, are located on opposite sides of the city. Neal Wilkins consists of the early learning center. Westview comprises first through fourth grade. Platteville Middle School is home to fifth through eighth graders. Platteville High School serves ninth through twelfth graders. O. E. Gray Early Learning Center closed after the 2007–2008 school year because of an enrollment drop in the district.

The superintendent is Jim Boebel. Platteville High School's mascot is the Hillmen, named after Coach Hill from the early-mid 1900s.
