= Robert Travis =

Robert Travis may refer to:

- Robert F. Travis (1904–1950), U.S. Air Force officer
- Robert S. Travis (1909–1980), Wisconsin politician
- Robert S. Travis Jr. (born 1947), American politician
