= Weston School District (Wisconsin) =

School district in Wisconsin, United States

Address
- E2511 County Hwy S Cazenovia, Sauk County, Wisconsin, 53924; United States
- Coordinates: 43.4806°N 90.1906°W

District information
- Type: Public
- Grades: Pre-K/K–12
- Superintendent: Molly Kasten
- Business administrator: Carrie Heiking
- School board: Seven members
- Schools: Elementary one, Middle one, High one
- NCES District ID: 5516470

Students and staff
- Students: 233 (2023-2024)

Other information
- Website: www.weston.k12.wi.us

The Weston School District is a school district based in the village of Cazenovia, Wisconsin. It serves the villages of Cazenovia and Lime Ridge and the surrounding rural area in the Sauk and Richland counties.

The district administers one elementary school, one middle school, and one high school, for a total of three schools. The district serves 233 students.

== Schools ==
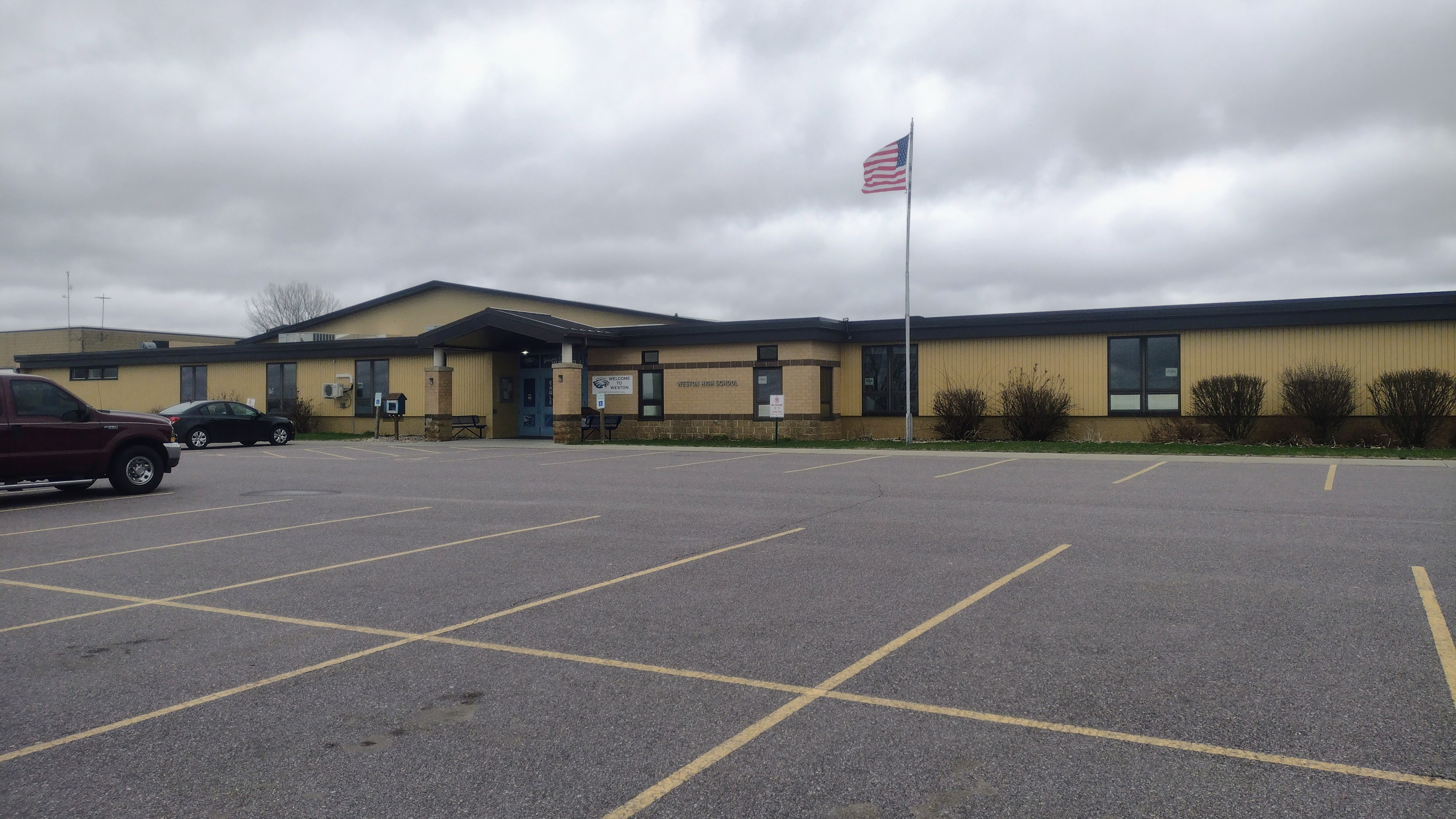
High School

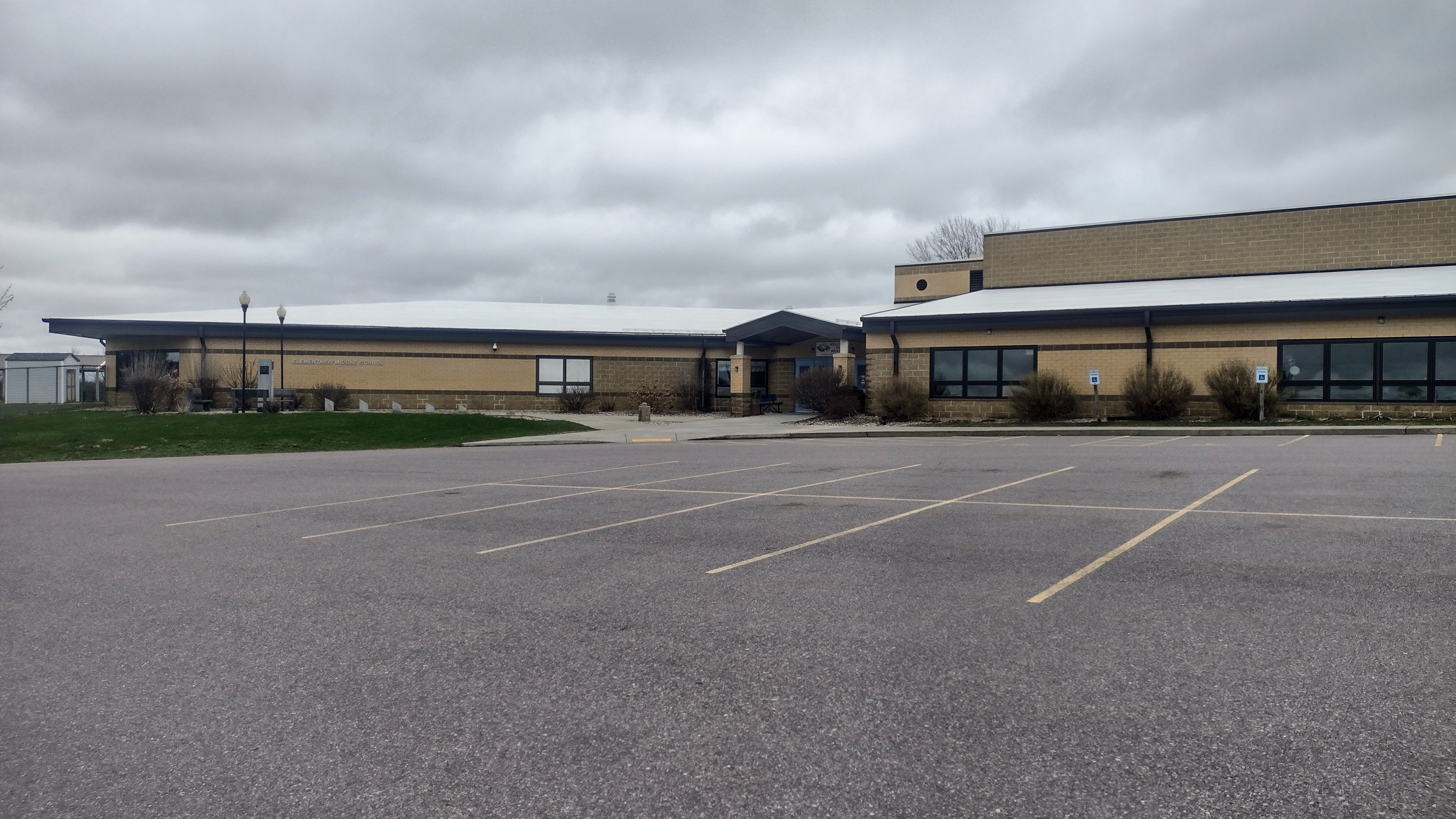
Elementary/Middle School

All of its three schools are located on the same property on County Hwy S.

== History ==
In 2006, Weston High School was the target of a school shooting, which killed Principal John Klang.

The school district over-collected funds from a 2015 operating referendum. In 2021, voters again approved a five year operating referendum to keep the school district intact. In 2025, a similar referendum failed. As of April 2025 it is still unknown what cuts to the district will be made without the extra funding.
