= Walworth Joint School District 1 =

School district in Wisconsin, United States

Walworth Joint School District #1

Location
- Walworth, Wisconsin; United States
- Coordinates: 42°31′47.5″N 88°36′03.0″W

District information
- Grades: PK-8
- Established: 1856; 169 years ago

Students and staff
- Enrollment: 476 (2016)
- Colors: Purple and Gold

Other information
- Website: www.walworth.k12.wi.us

Walworth Grade School is a PreK-8 public grade school located in South Central Walworth County in the Village of Walworth, Wisconsin. Walworth Elementary serves as a "feeder" school for Big Foot High School as part of the Big Foot Area Schools Association. Walworth Joint School District #1 is governed by a five-member board of education.

== Statistics ==
District Administrator: Mr. Phill Klamm

Principal: Caitlin Dowden,

Team name: Walworth Wildcats (formerly Walworth Warriors)
