= Walworth, Wisconsin =

- Village
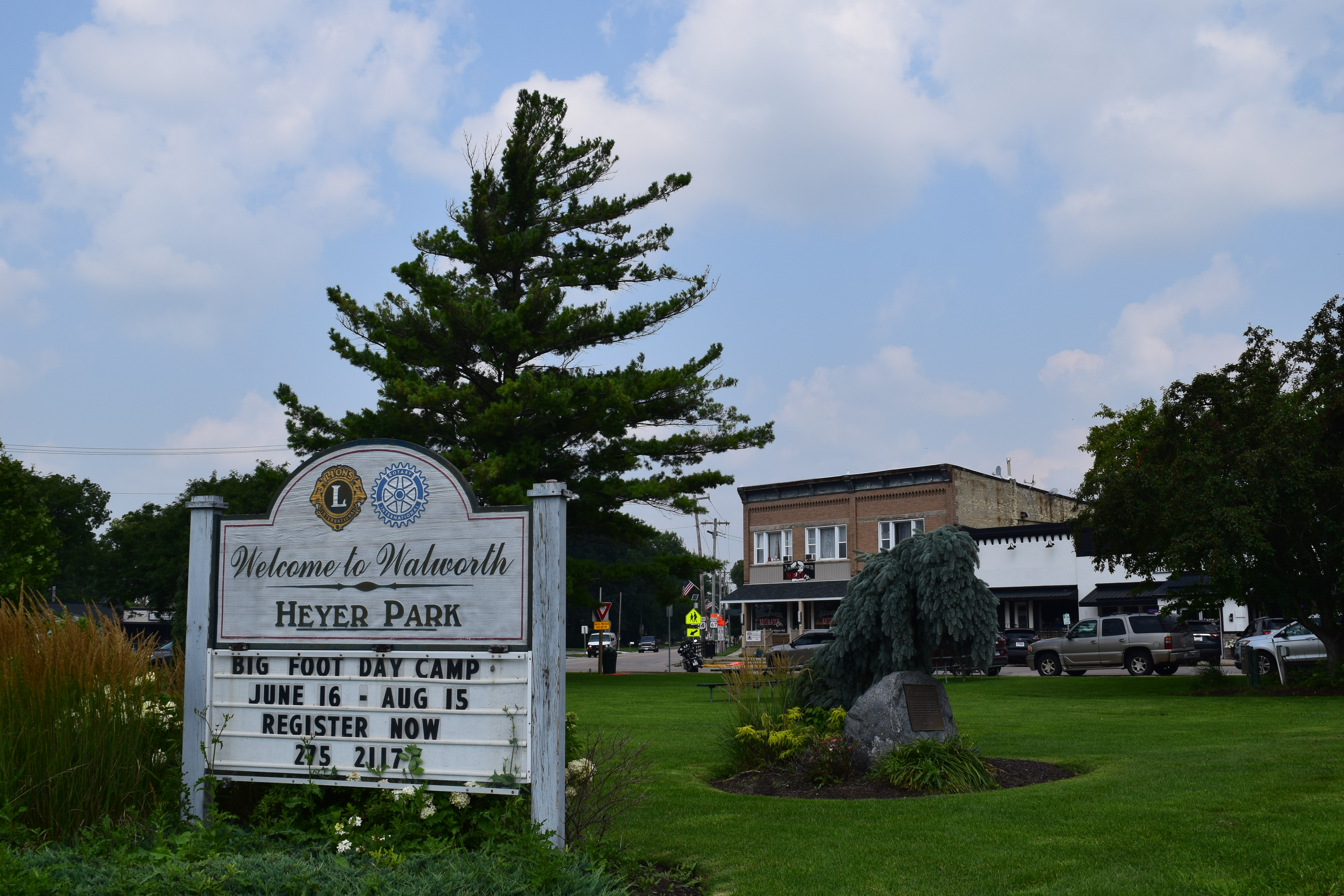
- Heyer Park in downtown Walworth

- Location of Walworth in Walworth County, Wisconsin.
- Coordinates: 42°32′46″N 88°35′45″W
- Country: United States
- State: Wisconsin
- County: Walworth

Area
  - Total: 1.72 sq mi (4.46 km^{2})
  - Land: 1.72 sq mi (4.46 km^{2})
  - Water: 0 sq mi (0.00 km^{2})
- Elevation: 1,004 ft (306 m)

Population (2020)
  - Total: 2,759
  - Density: 1,641.7/sq mi (633.86/km^{2})
- Time zone: UTC-6 (Central (CST))
  - Summer (DST): UTC-5 (CDT)
- ZIP Code: 53184
- Area code: 262
- FIPS code: 55-83275
- GNIS feature ID: 1576186
- Website: www.villageofwalworth.govoffice2.com

Walworth is a village in Walworth County, Wisconsin, United States. The population was 2,759 at the 2020 census. The village is located within the Town of Walworth.

== Geography ==
Walworth is located at 42°31′54″N 88°35′35″W (42.531825, −88.593227).

According to the United States Census Bureau, the village has a total area of 1.54 square miles (3.99 km^{2}), all land.

=== Major streets ===
- Beloit Street
- US Highway 14. Locally known as Madison Street north of the town square, and S. Main Street south of the town square.
- Wisconsin Highway 67. Intersects with Kenosha Street from the north. Known locally as Kenosha Street and South Main Street. Continues westward as Hwy 67 from the juncture of US 14 and Lakeville Road.

== Demographics ==
Historical population
Census	Pop.	Note	%±
1910	755		—
1920	757		0.3%
1930	920		21.5%
1940	875		−4.9%
1950	1,137		29.9%
1960	1,494		31.4%
1970	1,637		9.6%
1980	1,607		−1.8%
1990	1,614		0.4%
2000	2,304		42.8%
2010	2,816		22.2%
2020	2,759		−2.0%
U.S. Decennial Census

=== 2010 census ===
As of the census of 2010, there were 2,816 people, 1,068 households, and 700 families living in the village. The population density was 1,828.6 inhabitants per square mile (706.0/km^{2}). There were 1,172 housing units at an average density of 761.0 per square mile (293.8/km^{2}). The racial makeup of the village was 87.5% White, 0.7% African American, 0.1% Native American, 0.8% Asian, 0.2% Pacific Islander, 9.5% from other races, and 1.2% from two or more races. Hispanic or Latino of any race were 17.8% of the population.

There were 1,068 households, of which 37.1% had children under the age of 18 living with them, 49.5% were married couples living together, 11.1% had a female householder with no husband present, 4.9% had a male householder with no wife present, and 34.5% were non-families. 30.2% of all households were made up of individuals, and 13.5% had someone living alone who was 65 years of age or older. The average household size was 2.58 and the average family size was 3.22.

The median age in the village was 36.1 years. 28.4% of residents were under the age of 18; 7.2% were between the ages of 18 and 24; 25.8% were from 25 to 44; 23.7% were from 45 to 64; and 14.9% were 65 years of age or older. The gender makeup of the village was 48.1% male and 51.9% female.

=== 2000 census ===
As of the census of 2000, there were 2,304 people, 850 households, and 582 families living in the village. The population density was 1,583.9 people per square mile (613.5/km^{2}). There were 893 housing units at an average density of 613.9 per square mile (237.8/km^{2}). The racial makeup of the village was 97.22% White, 0.48% Black or African American, 0.09% Native American, 0.65% Asian, 0.04% Pacific Islander, 1.17% from other races, and 0.35% from two or more races. 7.16% of the population were Hispanic or Latino of any race.

There were 850 households, out of which 35.5% had children under the age of 18 living with them, 53.3% were married couples living together, 10.6% had a female householder with no husband present, and 31.5% were non-families. 26.1% of all households were made up of individuals, and 11.8% had someone living alone who was 65 years of age or older. The average household size was 2.57 and the average family size was 3.11.

In the village, the population was spread out, with 26.9% under the age of 18, 7.0% from 18 to 24, 28.3% from 25 to 44, 20.1% from 45 to 64, and 17.8% who were 65 years of age or older. The median age was 37 years. For every 100 females, there were 90.7 males. For every 100 females age 18 and over, there were 83.4 males.

The median income for a household in the village was $43,672, and the median income for a family was $51,630. Males had a median income of $35,492 versus $23,693 for females. The per capita income for the village was $19,311. About 5.4% of families and 8.7% of the population were below the poverty line, including 8.3% of those under age 18 and 16.8% of those age 65 or over.

== Education ==
Walworth has two public schools. Walworth Joint School District 1 operates Walworth Elementary as a PreK-8 school with approximately 575 students. Big Foot High School serves approximately 468 students in grades 9–12 from the villages of Fontana, Sharon and Walworth; and the townships of Walworth, Delavan, Linn and Sharon.

== Industry ==
Walworth is home to Kikkoman's first American factory, which opened in 1972. Kikkoman is the first Japanese company to open a factory within the United States.

== Transportation ==
Walworth was at one time the terminus of the Milwaukee Road's northern commuter train service. Service was cut back to Fox Lake, Illinois in 1982 when Metra took over ownership of the route. The Walworth station platform and the turnaround track remain, but are unused. The Wisconsin and Southern Railroad operates a daily freight train that passes by Walworth.

== See also ==
- List of villages in Wisconsin
