= River Valley School District (Wisconsin) =

School district in Wisconsin, United States

Address
- 660 West Daley Street Spring Green, Sauk County, Wisconsin, 53588; United States

District information
- Type: Public
- Grades: K–12
- Superintendent: Loren Glasbrenner
- Schools: Elementary two, Middle one, High one
- NCES District ID: 5514250

Students and staff
- Students: 1,090 (2023-2024

Other information
- Website: www.rvschools.org

The River Valley School District is a school district based in the village of Spring Green, Wisconsin. It serves the villages of Spring Green, Lone Rock, Plain, Arena and the surrounding rural area.

The district administers two elementary schools, one middle school, and one high school, for a total of four schools.

== Schools ==
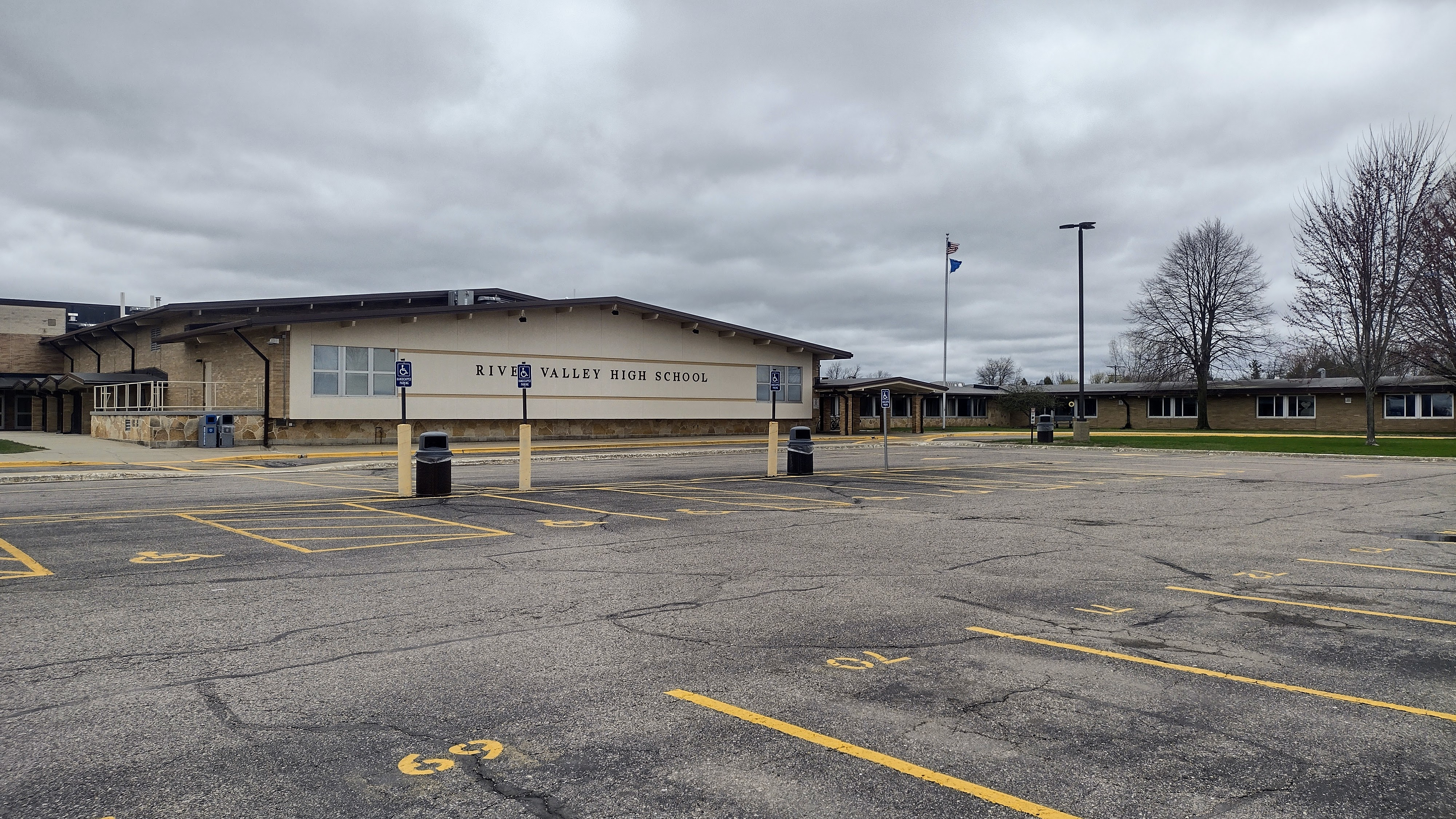
High School

School	Year built	Description
River Valley High School	1962	
River Valley Middle School		
River Valley Elementary School		
River Valley Early Learning Center		

== School fair ==
The district organizes a school fair every year in the fall. It was started in 1963 by Lone Rock resident and farmer Lawrence Eberle.
