= Antigo School District =

School district in Wisconsin, United States

Unified School District of Antigo

Address
- 120 S Dorr Street Antigo, Wisconsin, 54409; United States
- Coordinates: 45.139°N 89.155°W

District information
- Type: Public school district
- Grades: PK–12
- NCES District ID: 5500360

Students and staff
- Students: ~1,899
- Teachers: 127.65
- Student–teacher ratio: 14.88
- District mascot: Red Robins
- Colors: Maroon and White

Other information
- Website: antigo.k12.wi.us

The Unified School District of Antigo (commonly called Antigo School District) is a public school district headquartered in Antigo, Wisconsin. The district serves students spanning portions of Langlade, Marathon, and Shawano counties.

== Admininstration ==
The district is governed by an elected, non-partisan Board of Education that oversees local educational policy, district budgeting, and strategic planning. Administrative operations are managed from the district office located on South Dorr Street in Antigo.

== District History ==
The Unified School District of Antigo traces its educational roots back to the late 19th century, coinciding with the rapid growth and settlement of Langlade County, Wisconsin. Antigo High School opened its doors with its first class in 1890, initially established during a period when the city's population experienced a major boom.

In June 2019, the Unified School District of Antigo closed three rural elementary schools, a decision that brought an end to generations of community tradition and drew widespread emotional reflections from local students, teachers, and families.

Following the approval of a $54 million capital referendum by voters in November 2024, the Unified School District of Antigo initiated plans to construct a brand-new primary education facility designated as John H. Bradley Elementary School. The new facility facilitates the structural transition away from older neighborhood buildings.

In April 2025, the Unified School District of Antigo announced significant structural changes to its elementary school system for the 2025–2026 school year, which included the closure of East Elementary School.

== Schools ==
The district operates multiple school facilities catering to early childhood education through secondary instruction:

=== Secondary Schools ===
- High School: Antigo High School (Grades 8–12)
- Middle School: Antigo Middle School (Grades 4–7)

=== Elementary Schools ===
- North Elementary School (Grades PK–3)
- West Elementary School (PK-3)
- John H. Bradley Elementary School (PK-4, after established)

=== Closed Elementary Schools ===
These schools were originally built during the late-1950s consolidation wave. They were ultimately closed to combat the financial pressures of declining student enrollment and to ensure all students had equal access to special education and support services, which were difficult to fund in smaller, spread-out rural facilities.

- East Elementary School (PK-3), 1961-2025
- Pleasant View Elementary School, 1962-2019 (K-5)
- Spring Valley Elementary School, 1962-2019 (K-6)
- Crestwood Elementary School, 1959-2019 (K-6)
- River Grove Elementary School, 1961-2007 (K-6)
