= Prairie du Chien Area School District =

School district in Wisconsin, United States

Coordinates: 43°02′32″N 91°08′10″W

The Prairie du Chien School District is a public school district headquartered in Prairie du Chien, in Crawford County, Wisconsin, United States. It serves the city of Prairie du Chien as well as the nearby village of Eastman. It includes portions of the towns of Bridgeport, Eastman, and Prairie du Chien, as well as a small portion of the town of Wauzeka.

The mascot of the Prairie du Chien High School is "the Blackhawks," in commemoration of the Sauk leader Black Hawk, who surrendered at Fort Crawford in Prairie du Chien after the Black Hawk War in 1832.

== History ==
Bob Smudde was superintendent until 2019 since he took the equivalent position at Dodgeville School District. That year, Bryce Bird became the superintendent.

Andy Banasik, who from 1996 had been principal of the high school, became the superintendent of the entire district in 2020.

In 2024, the district proposed a bond for maintaining existing facilities and programs, called an "operational bond," as opposed to a bond for new facilities.

== Schools ==
The district comprises three schools, all located in Prairie du Chien:

- B. A. Kennedy Elementary School (early childhood education - grade 1).
- Bluff View Intermediate School (grades 2-8)
- Prairie du Chien High School (grades 9-12)

The administrative offices for the district are located at B. A. Kennedy Elementary School.
