= Iowa-Grant School District =

School district in Wisconsin, United States

Address
- 498 County Road IG Livingston, Wisconsin, 53554; United States

District information
- Type: Public School District
- Motto: “Where together we make a difference..”
- Grades: PK–12
- Established: 1958; 67 years ago
- Superintendent: Stephanie Hubbard
- Schools: 2
- NCES District ID: 5506870

Students and staff
- Enrollment: 667 (2023–2024)
- Teachers: 60.00 (on an FTE basis)
- Staff: 40.02 (on an FTE basis)
- Student–teacher ratio: 11.12
- Athletic conference: Southwest Athletic League
- Colors: Red & Black

Other information
- Website: www.igs.k12.wi.us

Iowa-Grant School District is a school district headquartered in Livingston, Wisconsin, and named for the counties in which the district is located. The district encompasses the villages of Cobb, Linden, Livingston, Montfort, Rewey, the town of Mifflin, and the unincorporated communities of Edmund, and Arthur. It comprises two schools: an elementary/middle school and a high school.

Across from the current campus is a renovated historical one-room schoolhouse known as Hazel Dell.

The school colors are red and black. The school song is Across the Field. The school's mascot is the panther.

== Schools ==
- Iowa-Grant Elementary/Middle School
- Iowa-Grant High School

== Sports ==
Iowa-Grant competes in the Southwest Wisconsin Conference (SWC), in Division 5 in football, and in Division 3 in other sports. Prior to the creation of SWAL Iowa-Grant was in the Southern 8 conference. Each year the Iowa-Grant football team plays Fennimore for the "milk can", because both communities have cheese factories. The school fight song is "Across the Field."

=== Conference champions ===
- Football: 1974, 1975 (co-champion with Cuba City), 1976, 1977, 1979, 1988, 1993, 2005 (co-champion with Darlington), 2009 (co-champion with Darlington and Cuba City)
- Volleyball: 1980, 1986, 1987, 1988, 1989, 1990, 1991, 1992, 1993, 1994, 1995, 1996, 1997, 1998, 1999
- Cross Country: 1962, 1965, 2000, 2022
- Wrestling: 1969, 1973, 2006, 2012
- Golf: 2002, 2003, 2004, 2005, 2006, 2008
- Baseball: 1975, 1976, 1977, 1995, 2007
- Boys Basketball: 1969, 1982, 1989, 1995, 2016
- Girls Basketball: 1988, 1995
- Softball: 1988, 1989, 1990, 1991, 1996, 1997, 1998, 2014, 2017

=== State champions ===
- Boys Basketball: 1981
- Cross Country: 2000
- Wrestling: 2004
- Football: 1977
- Women's Volleyball: 1978, 1989, 1997
