= Platteville High School =

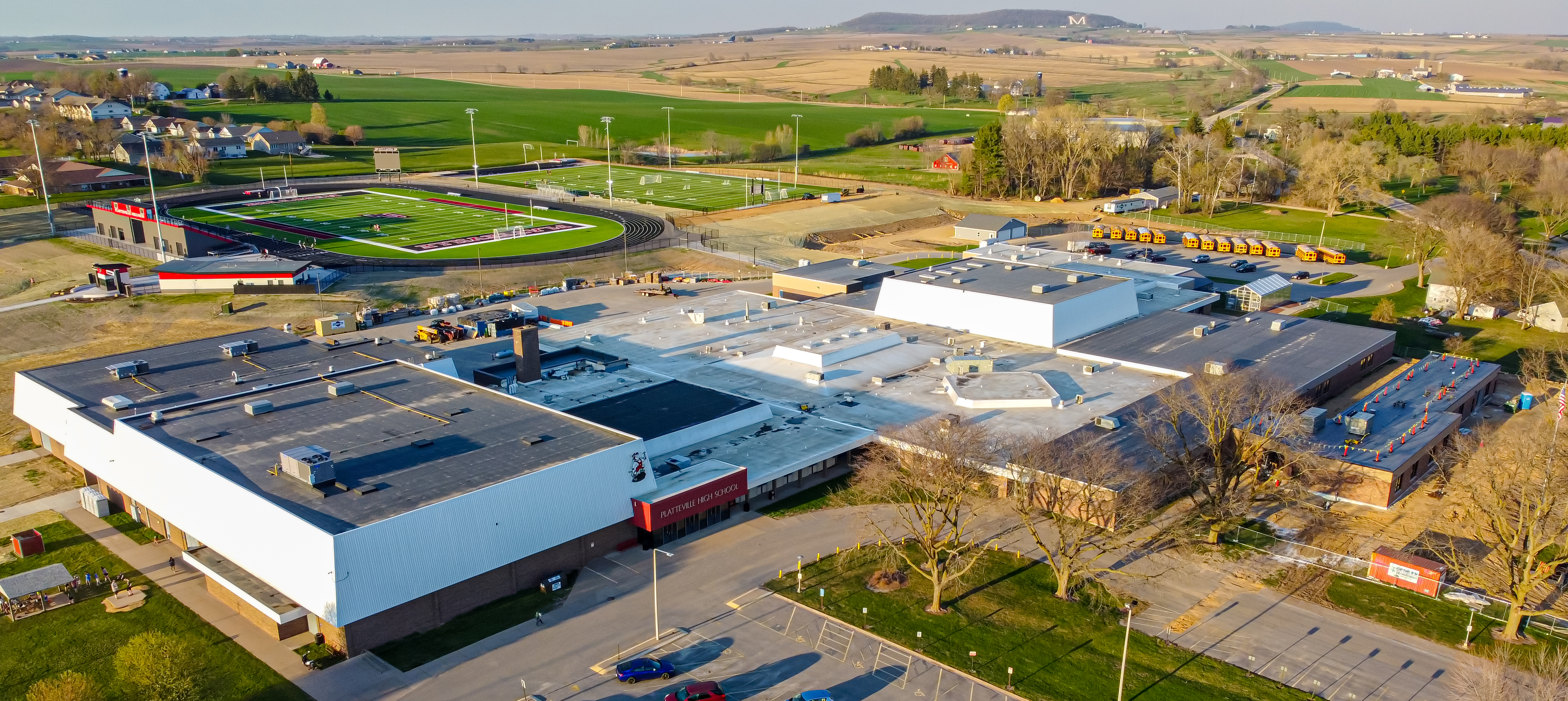

Location
- 710 East Madison Street; Platteville, Wisconsin 53818; United States; 42.74161°N 90.4637°W

Information
- School type: Public high school
- Motto: Pursuing Excellence
- Established: 1892
- School district: Platteville School District
- Principal: Jacob Crase
- Faculty: 31.50 (FTE)
- Grades: 09–12
- Enrollment: 482 (2023-2024)
- Student to teacher ratio: 15.30
- Campus type: Large Rural Community
- Colors: Cardinal & White
- Mascot
- Website: https://www.platteville.k12.wi.us/o/platteville/page/students-1

Platteville High School is the only high school in the Platteville School District in Platteville, Wisconsin.

Platteville High School has accumulated more Southwest Wisconsin Conference championships than any other school in the conference.

== Notable alumni ==
- Paul Chryst, former head football coach at the University of Pittsburgh and University of Wisconsin-Madison
- Nicki (Taggart) Collen, head women's basketball coach at Baylor University, 2018 WNBA Coach of the Year with the Atlanta Dream.
- Herbert Spencer Gasser, American physiologist who won the Nobel Prize for Physiology or Medicine in 1944.
- Robert S. Travis, Jr., Wisconsin State Representative
