= Boscobel High School =

- U.S. National Register of Historic Places
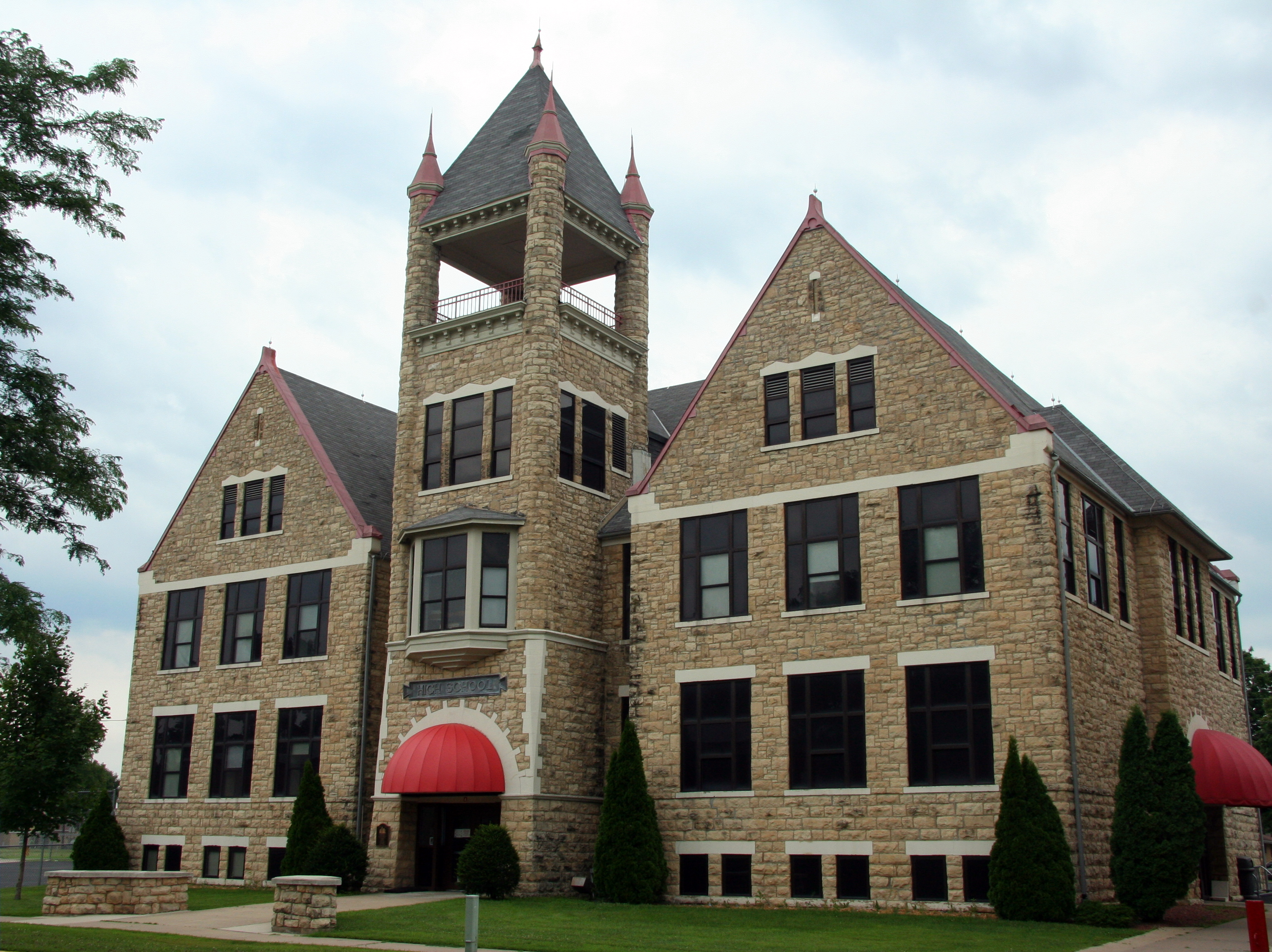
- Boscobel High School

- Location within Wisconsin
- Location: 207 Buchanan St., Boscobel, Wisconsin
- Coordinates: 43°07′59″N 90°42′11″W
- Area: less than one acre
- Built: 1898
- Architect: Van Ryn & DeGelleke
- Architectural style: Richardsonian Romanesque
- NRHP reference No.: 86003518
- Added to NRHP: December 30, 1986

Boscobel High School, also known as the Rock School, is a historic school building at 207 Buchanan Street in Boscobel, Wisconsin.

== Description and history ==
Boscobel High School was built in 1898 to replace Boscobel's original high school, which opened in 1867. Milwaukee architects Van Ryn & DeGelleke, who designed schools for four of Wisconsin's state universities and many local school districts, designed the Romanesque Revival building. The building is three stories tall and clad in local limestone with a four-story tower above the front entrance. Its design includes an arched entrance, stone lintels, an oriel window on the tower, and front-facing gables on each side of the tower. The school operated until 1984 and is the oldest educational building remaining in Boscobel.
