= Potosi School District =

School district in Wisconsin, United States

The Potosi School District is a school district that serves Potosi, Tennyson, and surrounding areas in Wisconsin. As of 2009, the district administrator was Dr. Steven C. Lozeau.

The school has had a difficult time meeting funding needs over the past decade. In 2000, voters approved a $1 million building project to add and remodel classrooms in the elementary and high schools, after rejecting four previous referendums. In 2006, voters in the district narrowly voted to exceed the state-imposed revenue limit by $150,000 in a 389 to 387 vote. At one time, the school principal even resorted to scrounging for scrap metal to install lights on the football field.

== Demographics ==
The district served 378 students in the 2008–2009 school year. The students of the district were 99.7% white and 0.3% black.

== Schools ==
- [[Pot

High School]]

- Potosi School
- Potosi Elementary School
