= Dodgeville School District =

School district in Wisconsin, United States

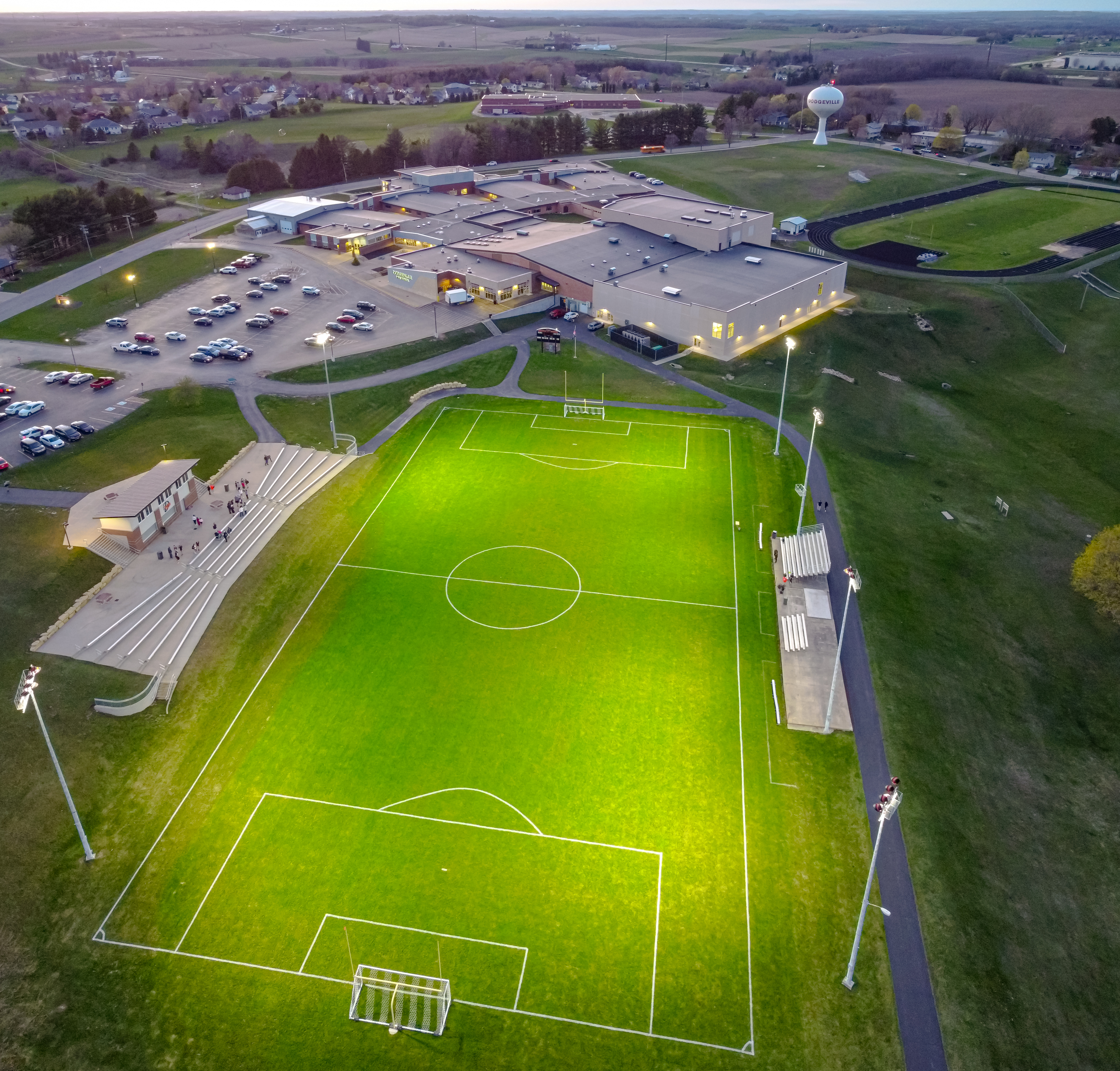
Dodgeville High School

The Dodgeville School District is headquartered in the city of Dodgeville, Wisconsin. It serves students from Dodgeville and Ridgeway. It consists of three schools - one elementary school, one middle school, and one high school. The elementary school covers pre-K through 4th grade. The middle school serves grades 5 through 8, and the high school 9 through 12. A second elementary school, Ridgeway Elementary School, was previously located in Ridgeway but closed at the end of the 2020 school year after being consolidated with Dodgeville Elementary School.

== History ==
The first settlements in Dodgeville began around 1827. By 1833, the first teacher, Robert Beyer, had arrived, and "before a year passed (he) had convinced the parents of Dodgeville to pay for a teacher for their children." The first school house was named the "Old Rock School", and the first teacher, Mary Carrier, arrived in 1834. She later married, becoming Mary Carrier Ranger. The school district grew and in 1850, split into two districts, the Grove School, and the Old Rock School. They formed a fierce rivalry in education and sports. A new "grammar hall" was established in 1864 that combined the two districts. Classes for the new district were held in the old town hall. Merril Fellows became the first principal of the Dodgeville School District in 1863.

J.W. Livingston, a well-known teacher in southwestern Wisconsin, taught at Dodgeville between 1877 and 1890. A new high school that "ranked with the best in the state" was built in 1881. Four students received their diplomas in 1883, were the first to be awarded in Dodgeville. $7000 was spent on improvements in 1891, providing a kindergarten, better equipment, and furnishings for the school. A new high school was built next to the old one in 1906. This building eventually became the middle school and was demolished in 2004. A new high school was built in 1939 to provide more space for students. The current high school building was built in 1962, and the current middle school building in 1994. Ridgeway High School and Dodgeville High School combined into a single entity in Dodgeville in 1963.

In 2005 conservative Christian groups opposed Ridgeway Elementary School's decision to perform a secular rendition of several Christmas songs in its annual holiday program. At the height of the scandal, former Fox News commentator Bill O'Reilly made an appearance on the Late Night Show with David Letterman, where he made false claims criticizing the school district.

A special education program was started in 1965 to provide on the job training for students.

== Athletics ==
The Dodgeville School District athletic teams are known as the Dodgeville Dodgers, with the letter "D" used for the team symbol. Previously, the district had used the icon, "Dodger Dan". Because the figure was controversial in that it represented only the male population, it was dropped.

=== Conference membership ===
Dodgeville High School athletics have belonged to the following conferences:

- Southwest Wisconsin Athletic League (1926-1971)
- Southern Eight Conference (1971-1987)
- Southwest Wisconsin Athletic League (1987-2005)
- Southwest Wisconsin Conference (2005-present)

=== Football ===
The Dodgeville and Mineral Point football rivalry can be traced back to 1898. This rivalry holds the record for most games played between two schools in Wisconsin, although it is not the oldest rivalry in Wisconsin high school football.

=== Boys' basketball ===
Boys' basketball was the first sport the school district adopted as an extra-curricular activity, beginning in the late 1890s. The 1964 state championship, the only in Dodger boys basketball history, occurred at a time when there was only one athletic division in the state. Dodgeville beat Milwaukee North 59-45 for the victory.

=== Volleyball ===
The volleyball team has won state championships three times, in 1995, 1996, and 1999, and was conference champion in 2001.

=== Boys' cross country ===
Dodgeville and Mineral Point have a joint cross country team, which began in 1992. As a standalone team, Dodgeville won state championships in 1967 and 1972.

=== Girls' cross country ===
The Dodgeville girls' cross country team made the state race for 16 straight seasons (1996–2011), earning four championships and two runner-up places.
