= Livingston, Wisconsin =

Village in Wisconsin divided between two counties

- Village
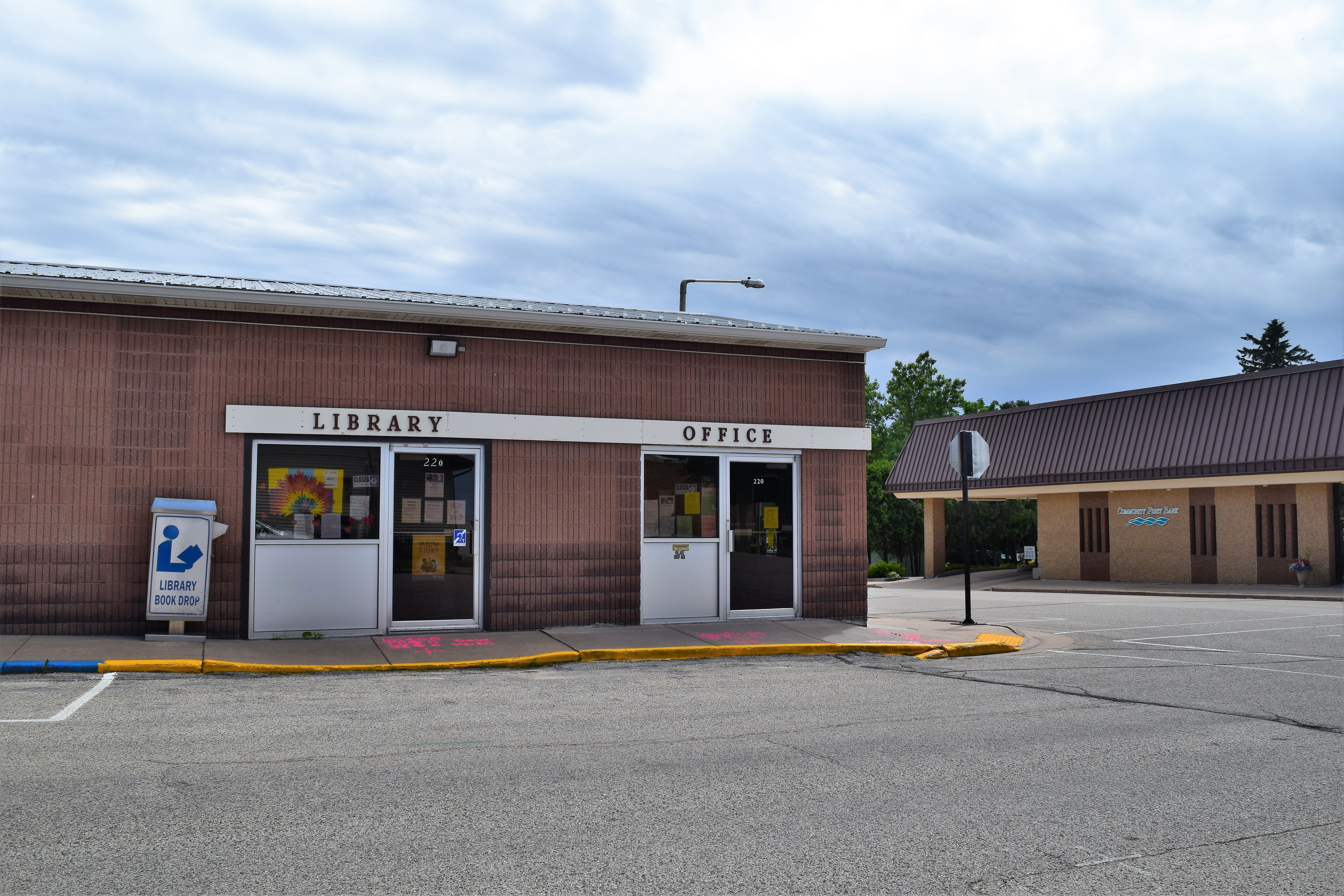
- Livingston library

- Location of Livingston in Grant County, Wisconsin.
- Coordinates: 42°54′3″N 90°25′54″W
- Country: United States
- State: Wisconsin
- Counties: Grant, Iowa

Area
  - Total: 1.04 sq mi (2.69 km^{2})
  - Land: 1.04 sq mi (2.69 km^{2})
  - Water: 0 sq mi (0.00 km^{2})
- Elevation: 1,152 ft (351 m)

Population (2020)
  - Total: 637
  - Density: 613/sq mi (237/km^{2})
- Time zone: UTC-6 (Central (CST))
  - Summer (DST): UTC-5 (CDT)
- Area code: 608
- FIPS code: 55-45325
- GNIS feature ID: 1568470
- Website: villageoflivingston.com

Livingston is a village in Grant and Iowa Counties in the U.S. state of Wisconsin. The population was 637 at the 2020 census. Of this, 657 were in Grant County, and only 12 were in Iowa County.

The Iowa County portion of Livingston is part of the Madison, Wisconsin metropolitan area , while the Grant County portion is part of the Platteville Micropolitan Statistical Area.

== History ==
A post office called Livingston has been in operation since 1880. The village was named for Hugh Livingston, the original owner of the town site.

A meteorite fell to the Earth near and in the village on April 14, 2010, following a spectacular bolide and aerial explosion seen over much of the midwestern United States.

== Geography ==
Livingston is located at 42°54′3″N 90°25′54″W (42.900713, -90.431649).

According to the United States Census Bureau, the village has a total area of 1.02 square miles (2.64 km^{2}), all land.

== Demographics ==
Historical population
Census	Pop.	Note	%±
1880	28		—
1920	545		—
1930	470		−13.8%
1940	520		10.6%
1950	452		−13.1%
1960	488		8.0%
1970	503		3.1%
1980	642		27.6%
1990	576		−10.3%
2000	597		3.6%
2010	664		11.2%
2020	637		−4.1%
U.S. Decennial Census

=== 2010 census ===
As of the census of 2010, there were 664 people, 263 households, and 175 families living in the village. The population density was 651.0 inhabitants per square mile (251.4/km^{2}). There were 277 housing units at an average density of 271.6 per square mile (104.9/km^{2}). The racial makeup of the village was 99.7% White, 0.2% African American, and 0.2% from two or more races.

There were 263 households, of which 33.1% had children under the age of 18 living with them, 54.8% were married couples living together, 6.5% had a female householder with no husband present, 5.3% had a male householder with no wife present, and 33.5% were non-families. 28.5% of all households were made up of individuals, and 17.5% had someone living alone who was 65 years of age or older. The average household size was 2.50 and the average family size was 3.05.

The median age in the village was 35.8 years. 27.3% of residents were under the age of 18; 6.2% were between the ages of 18 and 24; 26.5% were from 25 to 44; 22.5% were from 45 to 64; and 17.5% were 65 years of age or older. The gender makeup of the village was 48.5% male and 51.5% female.

=== 2000 census ===
As of the census of 2000, there were 597 people, 252 households, and 161 families living in the village. The population density was 581.5 people per square mile (223.8/km^{2}). There were 262 housing units at an average density of 255.2 per square mile (98.2/km^{2}). The racial makeup of the village was 100.00% White. Hispanic or Latino of any race were 0.34% of the population.

There were 252 households, out of which 27.8% had children under the age of 18 living with them, 53.6% were married couples living together, 7.1% had a female householder with no husband present, and 36.1% were non-families. 32.9% of all households were made up of individuals, and 17.5% had someone living alone who was 65 years of age or older. The average household size was 2.37 and the average family size was 3.02.

In the village, the population was spread out, with 23.1% under the age of 18, 7.9% from 18 to 24, 28.8% from 25 to 44, 22.6% from 45 to 64, and 17.6% who were 65 years of age or older. The median age was 40 years. For every 100 females, there were 91.3 males. For every 100 females age 18 and over, there were 87.3 males.

The median income for a household in the village was $35,417, and the median income for a family was $41,477. Males had a median income of $26,875 versus $19,265 for females. The per capita income for the village was $16,647. About 2.5% of families and 5.4% of the population were below the poverty line, including 2.6% of those under age 18 and 11.3% of those age 65 or over.

== Notable people ==
- William A. Loy, farmer and politician, was born in Livingston.
