= Lancaster Community School District =

School district in Wisconsin, United States

Address
- 231 N Sheridan St Lancaster, Wisconsin, 53813; United States

District information
- Grades: PK–12
- Schools: 3
- NCES District ID: 5507770 -->

Students and staff
- Students: 999 (2023–24)
- Teachers: 78.55 (on an FTE basis)
- Student–teacher ratio: 12.72:1

Other information
- Website: www.lancastersd.k12.wi.us

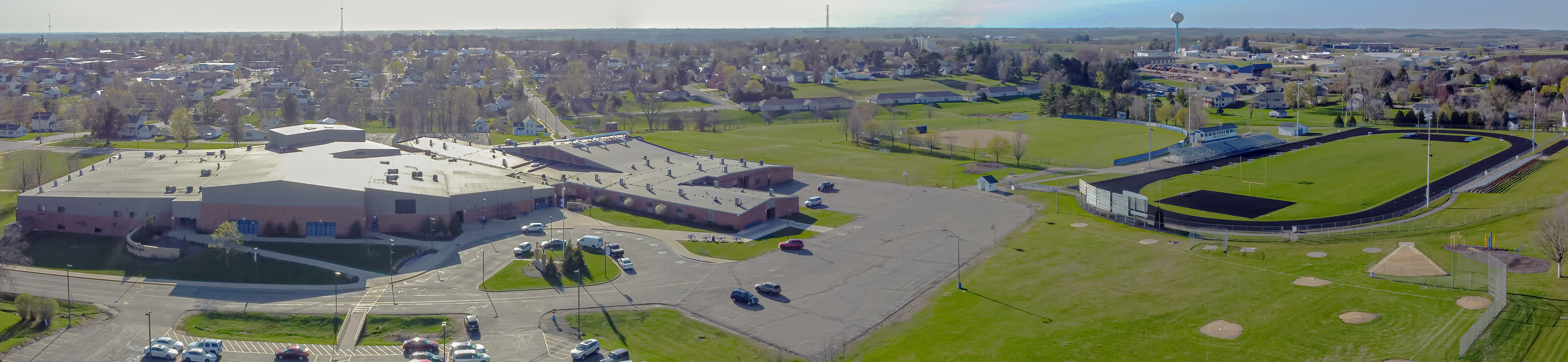

Lancaster Community School District is a school district in Lancaster, Wisconsin.

== Schools ==
- Lancaster High School
- Lancaster Middle School
- Lancaster Elementary School
