= Southwestern Wisconsin School District =

School district in Wisconsin, United States

Southwestern School District is a school district that serves Hazel Green, Wisconsin, as well as surrounding areas such as Kieler and Louisburg. As of 2020, the district administrator was John Castello. The district has a 15.1 to 1 student-to-teacher ratio.

Due to a decrease in student population, the Wisconsin Department of Public Instruction commissioned a study that recommended the district consolidate with the Benton, Cuba City, and Shullsburg School Districts It already shares programs and staff with the Benton and Cuba City school Districts for computer services and software.

== Demographics ==
The district served 581 students in the 2008–2009 school year. The students of the district were 99% white.

== Schools ==
- Southwestern High School
- Southwestern Elementary School
