= Hazel Green, Wisconsin =

- Village
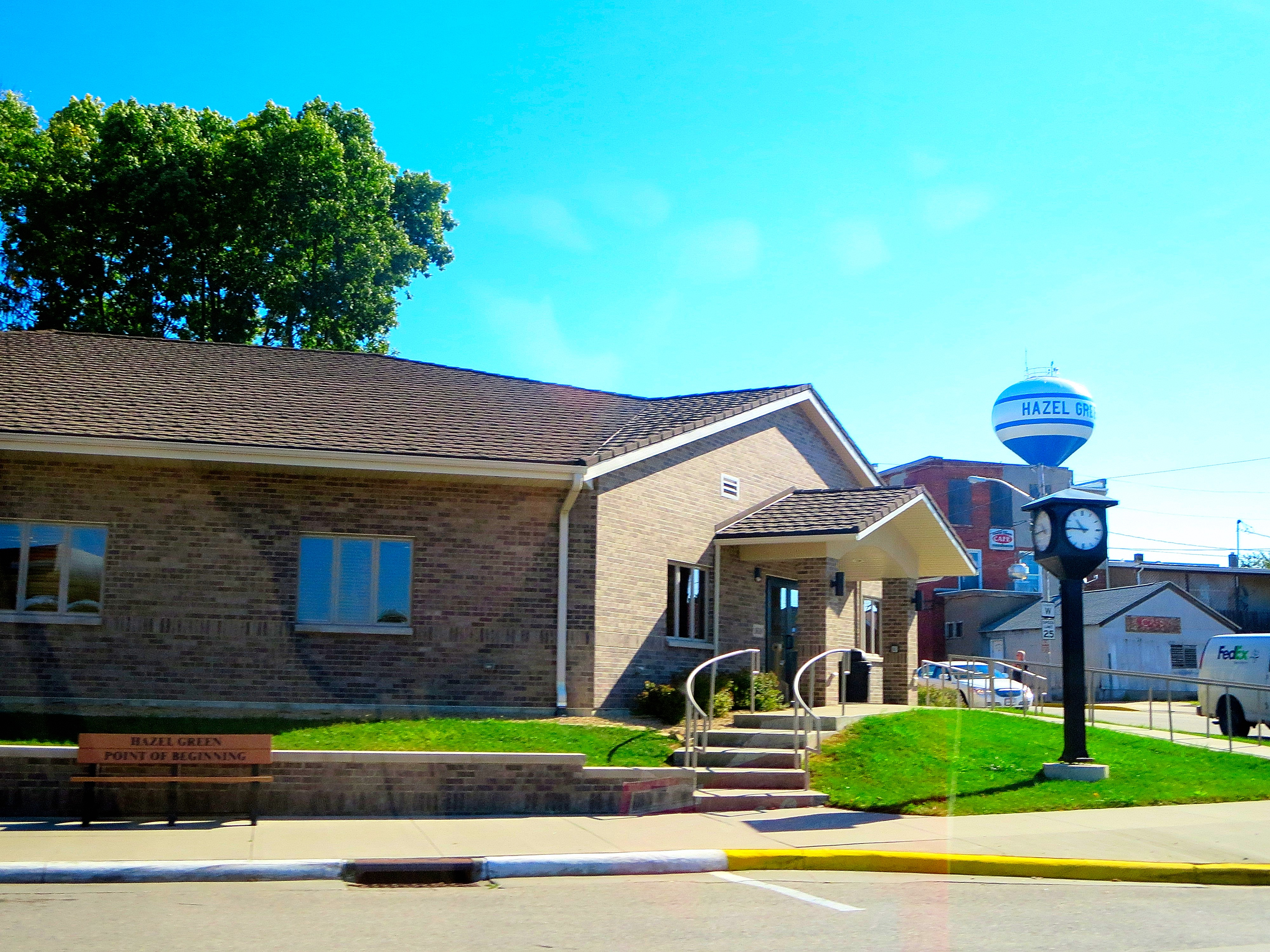
- Village hall
- Motto: Point of beginning
- Location within Grant County and Wisconsin
- Coordinates: 42°33′26″N 90°28′59″W
- Country: United States
- State: Wisconsin
- Counties: Grant, Lafayette
- Founded: 1825

Area
  - Total: 1.27 sq mi (3.3 km^{2})
  - Land: 1.27 sq mi (3.3 km^{2})
  - Water: 0 sq mi (0.00 km^{2})
- Elevation: 830 ft (250 m)

Population (2020)
  - Total: 1,173
  - Density: 924/sq mi (357/km^{2})
- Time zone: UTC-6 (Central (CST))
  - Summer (DST): UTC-5 (CDT)
- ZIP Code(s): 53811
- Area code: 608
- FIPS code: 55-33525
- GNIS feature ID: 1566231
- Website: villageofhazelgreen.org

Hazel Green is a village in Grant and Lafayette counties in the U.S. state of Wisconsin. The population was 1,173 at the 2020 census. Of this, 1,151 were in Grant County, and only 22 were in Lafayette County. The village is located mostly within the Town of Hazel Green in Grant County; only a small portion extends into the Town of Benton in Lafayette County.

== History ==
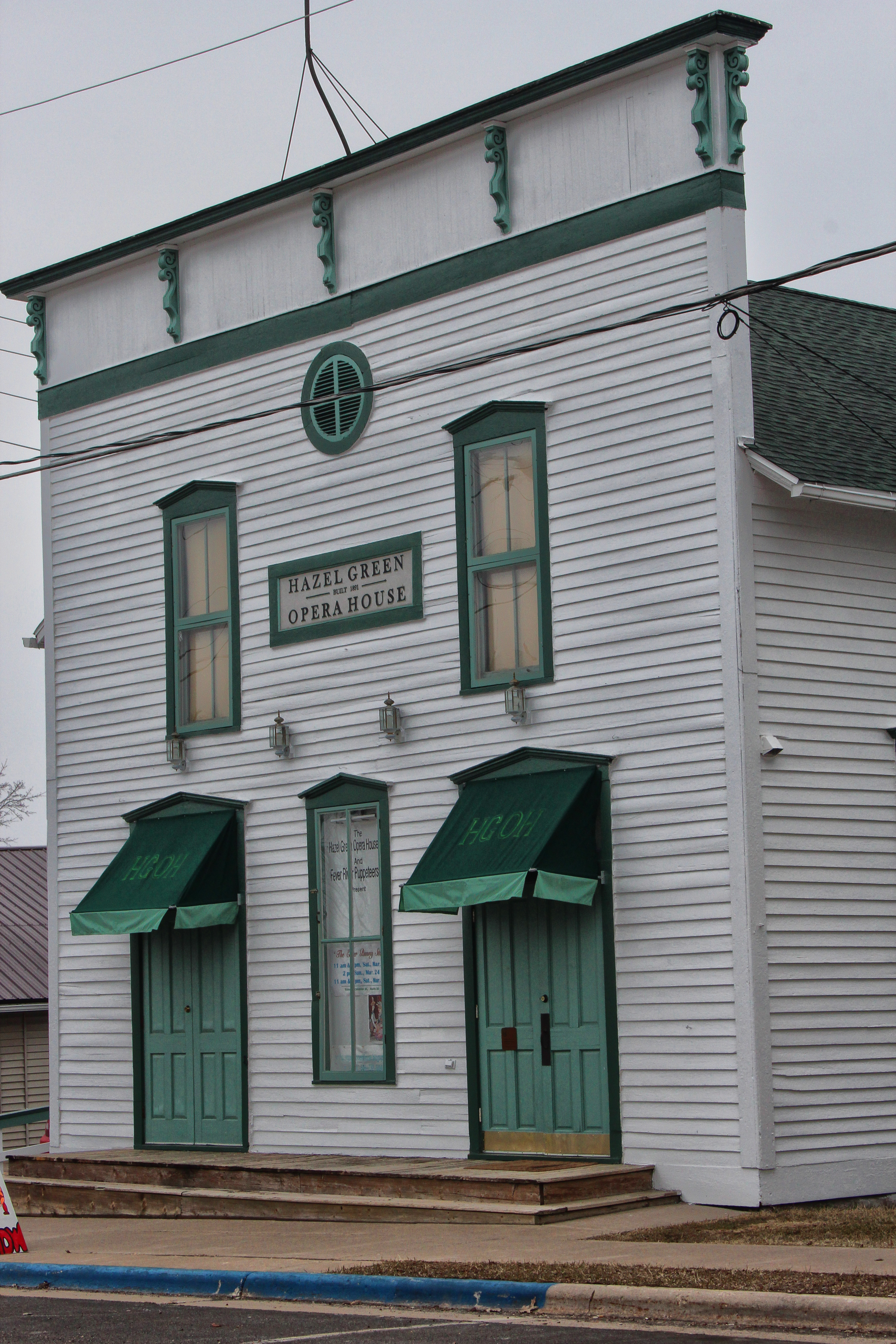
Hazel Green Opera House

In 1825, the village was named from dense growth of American Hazelnut near the town site.

In 1876, a tornado struck Hazel Green; nine died, many were injured, and property loss was approximately $40,000 to $50,000 (equivalent to $1.21 million to $1.51 million in 2025).

== Geography ==
Hazel Green is located at 42°31′57″N 90°26′3″W (42.532741, -90.434359).

According to the United States Census Bureau, the village has a total area of 1.30 square miles (3.37 km^{2}), all land.

== Demographics ==
Historical population
Census	Pop.	Note	%±
1870	723		—
1880	598		−17.3%
1890	426		−28.8%
1900	442		3.8%
1910	621		40.5%
1920	647		4.2%
1930	601		−7.1%
1940	582		−3.2%
1950	635		9.1%
1960	807		27.1%
1970	982		21.7%
1980	1,282		30.5%
1990	1,171		−8.7%
2000	1,183		1.0%
2010	1,256		6.2%
2020	1,173		−6.6%
U.S. Decennial Census

=== 2010 census ===
As of the census of 2010, there were 1,256 people, 531 households, and 333 families living in the village. The population density was 966.2 inhabitants per square mile (373.1/km^{2}). There were 557 housing units at an average density of 428.5 per square mile (165.4/km^{2}). The racial makeup of the village was 97.5% White, 0.2% African American, 0.1% Native American, 0.6% from other races, and 1.6% from two or more races. Hispanic or Latino of any race were 1.4% of the population.

There were 531 households, of which 29.4% had children under the age of 18 living with them, 49.0% were married couples living together, 9.2% had a female householder with no husband present, 4.5% had a male householder with no wife present, and 37.3% were non-families. 30.9% of all households were made up of individuals, and 11.7% had someone living alone who was 65 years of age or older. The average household size was 2.37 and the average family size was 2.99.

The median age in the village was 39.1 years. 24.9% of residents were under the age of 18; 8.8% were between the ages of 18 and 24; 24.4% were from 25 to 44; 27.5% were from 45 to 64; and 14.3% were 65 years of age or older. The gender makeup of the village was 49.1% male and 50.9% female.

=== 2000 census ===
As of the census of 2000, there were 1,183 people, 472 households, and 328 families living in the village. The population density was 941.8 people per square mile (362.5/km^{2}). There were 497 housing units at an average density of 395.7 per square mile (152.3/km^{2}). The racial makeup of the village was 99.58% White, 0.17% Black or African American, 0.08% Asian, and 0.17% from two or more races. Hispanic or Latino of any race were 0.34% of the population.

There were 472 households, out of which 31.8% had children under the age of 18 living with them, 55.7% were married couples living together, 10.2% had a female householder with no husband present, and 30.3% were non-families. 26.7% of all households were made up of individuals, and 12.1% had someone living alone who was 65 years of age or older. The average household size was 2.48 and the average family size was 2.98.

In the village, the population was spread out, with 25.8% under the age of 18, 7.7% from 18 to 24, 29.1% from 25 to 44, 23.4% from 45 to 64, and 14.0% who were 65 years of age or older. The median age was 37 years. For every 100 females, there were 89.9 males. For every 100 females age 18 and over, there were 90.0 males.

The median income for a household in the village was $39,643, and the median income for a family was $45,905. Males had a median income of $28,828 versus $19,706 for females. The per capita income for the village was $18,052. About 6.5% of families and 10.7% of the population were below the poverty line, including 19.6% of those under age 18 and 8.4% of those age 65 or over.

== Notable people ==
- John W. Cox, Jr., Illinois politician
- Leroy D. Eastman, lumberman, farmer, and politician
- John Edwards, lumberman and politician
- James Gates Percival, poet
- William A. Richards, Governor of Wyoming
- Burton A. Scott, Chief Judge of the Wisconsin Court of Appeals
- T. Harry Williams, historian, recipient of the Pulitzer Prize
- Glenn Thomas Trewartha, geographer and creator of the Trewartha climate classification
