= Black Hawk League =

Wisconsin high school athletic conference (1930-1997)

The Black Hawk League is a former high school athletic conference in Wisconsin. Formed in 1930 and in operation until 1997, its membership consisted primarily of small high schools in the southwest corner of Wisconsin. All members (with the exception of two) were affiliated with the Wisconsin Interscholastic Athletic Association.

== History ==
=== 1930–1959 ===
Location of Original Black Hawk League Members

The Black Hawk League was founded in 1930 by six small high schools in southwestern Wisconsin: Belmont, Benton, Hazel Green (now Southwestern), New Diggings, Shullsburg and South Wayne. It was named after the portion of southwestern Wisconsin (then Michigan Territory) where the Black Hawk War had been fought a century earlier. Darlington joined the conference in 1936, who maintained dual membership with the Southwest Wisconsin Athletic League for one season before leaving the Black Hawk League in 1938. Six-player football was sponsored for the first time in 1939, with State Line League members Argyle joining five conference members (Belmont, Benton, Hazel Green, Shullsburg and South Wayne) in the initial roster. Membership grew to eight schools after World War II with the addition of Gratiot High School in 1946 and Scales Mound High School in 1947. In 1953, New Diggings High School was closed when their district was consolidated into Hazel Green, and Scales Mound left two years later to rejoin their former home in the U.S. Grant Conference, an IHSA-sponsored conference in Illinois. The Black Hawk League also transitioned from six-player to eight-player football in 1955, with six participants.

=== 1959–1979 ===
The consolidation of rural school districts and folding of smaller athletic conferences in southwestern Wisconsin continued to affect Black Hawk League membership into the 1960s and 1970s. Cassville and Potosi joined from the West Grant League in 1959, and Bloomington joined the next year when the conference disbanded after all other members were lost to consolidation. South Wayne left to join the State Line League in 1962 and were replaced by Highland, who joined from the I-W League in 1963, one year before that conference's demise. The Black Hawk League lost Gratiot when it consolidated with South Wayne to form Black Hawk High School in 1967, and they took South Wayne's place in the State Line League. That same year, the Black Hawk League shifted to eleven-player football, and all members from the previous season participated with the exception of Potosi, who joined the league for the 1968 season. West Grant moved over from the Southwest Wisconsin Athletic League in 1969, and the conference added a tenth member (and its only private school) in 1979 when Martin Luther Prep moved their campus from New Ulm, Minnesota to the former Campion High School campus in Prairie du Chien.

=== 1979–1997 ===
Location of Final Black Hawk League Members

Southwestern High School's exit for the Southwest Wisconsin Athletic League brought conference membership in the Black Hawk League to nine in 1983. 1995 saw an even more drastic change to membership, with a net loss of two schools in the process. Martin Luther Prep merged with Northwestern Prep in Watertown to form Luther Prep, closing the Prairie du Chien campus in the process. In addition, Bloomington and West Grant were consolidated into River Ridge High School, repurposing the West Grant High School campus for their new home. For the final two years of the conference, the Black Hawk League added former State Line members Black Hawk and Pecatonica/Argyle for football when the league ended sponsorship of that sport after the 1993 season. In 1997, the seven members of the Black Hawk League merged with the nine members of the State Line League to form the new Six Rivers Conference.

== Conference membership history ==
=== Final members ===
School	Location	Affiliation	Mascot	Colors	Joined	Left	Conference Joined	Current Conference
Belmont	Belmont, WI	Public	Braves		1930	1997	Six Rivers	
Benton	Benton, WI	Public	Zephyrs		1930	1997	Six Rivers	
Cassville	Cassville, WI	Public	Comets		1959	1997	Six Rivers	
Highland	Highland, WI	Public	Cardinals		1963	1997	Six Rivers	
Potosi	Potosi, WI	Public	Chieftains		1959	1997	Six Rivers	
River Ridge	Patch Grove, WI	Public	Timberwolves		1995	1997	Six Rivers	
Shullsburg	Shullsburg, WI	Public	Miners		1930	1997	Six Rivers	

=== Previous members ===
School	Location	Affiliation	Mascot	Colors	Joined	Left	Conference Joined	Current Conference
Bloomington	Bloomington, WI	Public	Blue Jays		1960	1995	Closed (consolidated into River Ridge)	
Darlington	Darlington, WI	Public	Redbirds		1936	1938	SWAL	
Gratiot	Gratiot, WI	Public	Golden Eagles		1946	1967	Closed (consolidated into Black Hawk)	
Martin Luther Prep	Prairie du Chien, WI	Private (Lutheran, WELS)	Rams		1979	1995	Merged with Northwestern Prep (Luther Prep)	
New Diggings	New Diggings, WI	Public	Midgets		1930	1953	Closed (consolidated into Hazel Green)	
Scales Mound	Scales Mound, IL	Public	Hornets		1947	1955	U.S. Grant (IHSA)	Northwest Upsate Illini (IHSA)
South Wayne	South Wayne, WI	Public	Vandals		1930,	1962	State Line	Closed (consolidated into Black Hawk)
Southwestern	Hazel Green, WI	Public	Wildcats		1930	1983	Southern Eight	SWAL
West Grant	Patch Grove, WI	Public	Falcons		1969	1995	Closed (consolidated into River Ridge)	

=== Football-only members ===
School	Location	Affiliation	Mascot	Colors	Seasons	Primary Conference
Argyle	Argyle, WI	Public	Orioles		1939-1943	State Line
Hanover	Hanover, IL	Public	Red Devils		1952-1971	U.S. Grant (IHSA)
Black Hawk	South Wayne, WI	Public	Warriors		1994-1996	State Line
Pecatonica/ Argyle	Blanchardville, WI	Public	Vikings		1994-1996	State Line

== List of state champions ==
=== Fall sports ===
Football
School	Year	Division
Martin Luther Prep	1979	WISAA Class B
Martin Luther Prep	1982	WISAA Class B
Martin Luther Prep	1987	WISAA Class B

=== Winter sports ===
Boys Basketball
School	Year	Division
Bloomington	1972	Class B
Shullsburg	1991	Division 4
Cassville	1994	Division 4
Cassville	1995	Division 4

=== Spring sports ===
Baseball
School	Year	Division
Potosi	1993	Division 3

Softball
School	Year	Division
Martin Luther Prep	1989	WISAA Class B

Girls Track & Field
School	Year	Division
Bloomington	1975	Class C

== List of conference champions ==
=== Boys Basketball ===
School	Quantity	Years
Bloomington	13	1961, 1962, 1966, 1971, 1972, 1973, 1974, 1976, 1983, 1984, 1987, 1988, 1989
Cassville	11	1965, 1967, 1968, 1970, 1979, 1982, 1987, 1993, 1994, 1995, 1997
Belmont	10	1935, 1936, 1958, 1959, 1960, 1963, 1964, 1979, 1996, 1997
(Hazel Green) Southwestern	10	1933, 1934, 1937, 1941, 1942, 1945, 1968, 1969, 1978, 1981
Shullsburg	9	1950, 1951, 1953, 1954, 1955, 1957, 1974, 1990, 1991
South Wayne	8	1930, 1931, 1932, 1940, 1943, 1944, 1945, 1960
Benton	6	1938, 1939, 1949, 1954, 1956, 1985
West Grant	4	1975, 1980, 1985, 1986
New Diggings	3	1946, 1947, 1948
Highland	2	1966, 1992
Scales Mound	1	1952
Gratiot	1	1964
Darlington	0	
River Ridge	0	
Martin Luther Prep	0	
Potosi	0	

=== Girls Basketball ===
School	Quantity	Years
Bloomington	7	1976, 1984, 1986, 1987, 1992, 1994, 1995
West Grant	5	1982, 1983, 1984, 1990, 1991
Benton	2	1988, 1989
Cassville	1	1985
Highland	1	1993
Potosi	1	1997
Shullsburg	1	1996
Southwestern	1	1981
Belmont	0	
Martin Luther Prep	0	
River Ridge	0	
Champions from 1977-1980 unknown

=== Football ===
School	Quantity	Years
Shullsburg	13	1939, 1946, 1947, 1949, 1950, 1951, 1952, 1964, 1973, 1974, 1984, 1990, 1991
Cassville	11	1966, 1969, 1980, 1981, 1982, 1983, 1987, 1988, 1989, 1993, 1994
South Wayne	9	1940, 1943, 1944, 1950, 1953, 1956, 1958, 1959, 1960
Belmont	8	1944, 1965, 1967, 1968, 1977, 1978, 1979, 1995
Benton	7	1949, 1950, 1954, 1957, 1961, 1962, 1985
Bloomington	6	1970, 1971, 1972, 1981, 1988, 1993
(Hazel Green) Southwestern	5	1944, 1945, 1948, 1955, 1981
Potosi	3	1975, 1976, 1993
Argyle	2	1941, 1942
Highland	2	1990, 1992
Black Hawk	1	1995
Hanover	1	1963
Martin Luther Prep	1	1986
Pecatonica/ Argyle	1	1996
River Ridge	1	1995
Gratiot	0	
West Grant	0	
