= State Line League =

Wisconsin high school athletic conference (1927-1997)

The State Line League is a former high school athletic conference in Wisconsin. Formed in 1927 and ending competition in 1997, its membership consisted of small schools located in the southernmost counties of the state along the Wisconsin-Illinois border. All member schools (with the exception of one) were associated with the Wisconsin Interscholastic Athletic Association.

== History ==
=== 1927–1944 ===
Location of Original State Line League Members

The State Line League was formed in 1927 by eight small high schools in south central Wisconsin: Argyle, Belleville, Blanchardville, Brodhead, Hollandale, Juda, Monticello and New Glarus. Original member schools were located predominantly in Green and Lafayette Counties, which are located on the border between Wisconsin and Illinois. Albany High School joined the State Line League in the 1928-29 school year, taking the place of Juda, which left the league after its first season. Juda High School would make its return in 1929, bringing membership to nine schools. Two years later, membership would go back down to eight as Brodhead left to join the Rock River Valley League in 1931. Brooklyn High School would take their place the next year, and Orfordville High School would join in 1933. With the increase in membership to ten schools, the State Line League would split into Eastern and Western Divisions:

| Eastern Division | Western Division |
|---|---|
| Albany | Argyle |
| Brooklyn | Belleville |
| Juda | Blanchardville |
| Monticello | Hollandale |
| Orfordville | New Glarus |

=== 1944–1971 ===
The State Line League ended its two-division format and welcomed Brodhead back into the fold in 1944, bringing membership to eleven schools. Three years later, the State Line League sponsored football for the first time, and six members (Argyle, Belleville, Brodhead, Brooklyn, New Glarus and Orfordville) played in the six-player variant. Juda became the seventh football-playing member in 1949, and Blanchardville joined a year later after moving over from the Madison Suburban Conference and transitioning from eleven-player football. Hollandale left to join the Iowa County League in 1951, decreasing the amount of full members to ten schools. Eight-player football was adopted by the State Line League in 1954, and over the next few years, rural school district consolidations began to affect conference membership. Brooklyn High School was closed in 1962 and consolidated with the larger Oregon High School, and their place was immediately taken by South Wayne (formerly of the Black Hawk League). The next year, the State Line League transitioned to eleven-player football with eight participants. In 1967, South Wayne was merged with former conference rivals Gratiot to form Black Hawk High School, which remained in the State Line League after consolidation. In 1970, Parkview (formerly Orfordville) High School exited the State Line League to join the Central Suburban Conference. The last of the consolidations to affect membership occurred in 1971, when Blanchardville and Hollandale merged to form Pecatonica High School. Two schools joined the State Line League that year in addition to Pecatonica: Barneveld (from the disbanded Kickapoo Valley League) and Holy Name Seminary in Madison.

=== 1971–1997 ===
Location of Final State Line League Members

Membership in the State Line League remained stable for the rest of its existence with the exception of two schools leaving the conference. Brodhead joined the Rock Valley Conference in 1977, and Holy Name Seminary left the conference in 1995 after the Roman Catholic Diocese of Madison closed its doors that year. The State Line League ended sponsorship of football in 1993 when Black Hawk and Pecatonica/Argyle were approved as new football members in the Black Hawk League for the 1994 season. Coupled with the formation of the Sugar River Raiders football cooperative between three State Line members (Belleville, Monticello and New Glarus), the conference would have had only three members for football had it continued. In 1997, the Six Rivers Conference was formed through the merger of the nine members of the State Line League with the seven members of the neighboring Black Hawk League.

== Conference membership history ==
=== Final members ===
| School | Location | Affiliation | Mascot | Colors | Joined | Left | Conference Joined | Current Conference |
|---|---|---|---|---|---|---|---|---|
| Albany | Albany, WI | Public | Comets | | 1928 | 1997 | Six Rivers | |
| Argyle | Argyle, WI | Public | Orioles | | 1927 | 1997 | Six Rivers | |
| Barneveld | Barneveld, WI | Public | Golden Eagles | | 1971 | 1997 | Six Rivers | |
| Belleville | Belleville, WI | Public | Wildcats | | 1927 | 1997 | Six Rivers | Capitol |
| Black Hawk | South Wayne, WI | Public | Warriors | | 1967 | 1997 | Six Rivers | |
| Juda | Juda, WI | Public | Panthers | | 1927, 1929 | 1928, 1997 | Independent, Six Rivers | Six Rivers |
| Monticello | Monticello, WI | Public | Ponies | | 1927 | 1997 | Six Rivers | |
| New Glarus | New Glarus, WI | Public | Glarner Knights | | 1927 | 1997 | Six Rivers | Capitol |
| Pecatonica | Blanchardville, WI | Public | Vikings | | 1971 | 1997 | Six Rivers | |

=== Previous members ===
| School | Location | Affiliation | Mascot | Colors | Joined | Left | Conference Joined | Current Conference |
|---|---|---|---|---|---|---|---|---|
| Blanchardville | Blanchardville, WI | Public | Golden Eagles | | 1927 | 1971 | Closed (consolidated into Pecatonica) | |
| Brodhead | Brodhead, WI | Public | Cardinals | | 1927, 1944 | 1931, 1977 | Rock River Valley | Rock Valley |
| Brooklyn | Brooklyn, WI | Public | Hornets | | 1932 | 1962 | Closed (consolidated into Oregon) | |
| Hollandale | Hollandale, WI | Public | Panthers | | 1927 | 1951 | Iowa County | Closed (consolidated into Pecatonica) |
| Holy Name Seminary | Madison, WI | Private (Catholic) | Hilanders | | 1971 | 1995 | Closed in 1995 | |
| Parkview | Orfordville, WI | Public | Vikings | | 1933 | 1970 | Central Suburban | Trailways |
| South Wayne | South Wayne, WI | Public | Vandals | | 1962 | 1967 | Closed (consolidated into Black Hawk) | |

=== Football-only members ===
| School | Location | Affiliation | Mascot | Colors | Seasons | Primary Conference |
|---|---|---|---|---|---|---|
| Beloit Catholic | Beloit, WI | Private (Catholic) | Crusaders | | 1990-1991, 1993 | Rock Valley |

== Membership timeline ==
=== Full members ===
Eastern Division Western Division

== List of state champions ==
=== Fall sports ===
Boys Cross Country
| School | Year | Division |
|---|---|---|
| Albany | 1971 | Small Schools |
| Holy Name Seminary | 1972 | WISAA Class B |
| Albany | 1975 | Class C |
| Holy Name Seminary | 1979 | WISAA Class C |
| Holy Name Seminary | 1980 | WISAA Class C |
| Albany | 1987 | Class C |
| Albany | 1988 | Class C |
| Albany | 1989 | Class C |
| Albany | 1990 | Division 3 |

Girls Cross Country
| School | Year | Division |
|---|---|---|
| Albany | 1989 | Class C |
| Albany | 1990 | Division 3 |
| Albany | 1991 | Division 3 |

Football
| School | Year | Division |
|---|---|---|
| Holy Name Seminary | 1985 | WISAA Class B |

=== Winter sports ===
Girls Basketball
| School | Year | Division |
|---|---|---|
| Monticello | 1991 | Division 4 |
| Pecatonica | 1993 | Division 4 |
| Pecatonica | 1994 | Division 4 |
| Barneveld | 1995 | Division 4 |
| Barneveld | 1998 | Division 4 |

=== Spring sports ===
Boys Track & Field
| School | Year | Division |
|---|---|---|
| Holy Name Seminary | 1974 | WISAA Class C |
| Sugar River Raiders (Note: Belleville/New Glarus co-operative) | 1996 | Division 2 |

== List of conference champions ==
=== Boys Basketball ===
| School | Quantity | Years |
|---|---|---|
| New Glarus | 18 | 1930, 1932, 1934, 1935, 1937, 1939, 1940, 1952, 1956, 1959, 1960, 1971, 1973, 1976, 1982, 1986, 1991, 1994 |
| Monticello | 14 | 1936, 1937, 1938, 1939, 1941, 1946, 1950, 1951, 1957, 1958, 1969, 1973, 1974, 1979 |
| Brodhead | 12 | 1947, 1948, 1949, 1953, 1954, 1959, 1962, 1963, 1972, 1975, 1976, 1977 |
| Belleville | 8 | 1929, 1931, 1936, 1938, 1955, 1981, 1983, 1987 |
| Black Hawk | 6 | 1968, 1970, 1971, 1988, 1989, 1990 |
| Albany | 4 | 1935, 1942, 1965, 1978 |
| Argyle | 4 | 1963, 1970, 1972, 1992 |
| Brooklyn | 4 | 1934, 1943, 1944, 1945 |
| Blanchardville | 3 | 1942, 1961, 1971 |
| Juda | 3 | 1933, 1940, 1997 |
| Pecatonica | 3 | 1994, 1995, 1996 |
| Barneveld | 2 | 1980, 1983 |
| Holy Name Seminary | 2 | 1985, 1993 |
| (Orfordville) Parkview | 2 | 1964, 1966 |
| South Wayne | 1 | 1967 |
| Hollandale | 0 | |

=== Girls Basketball ===
| School | Quantity | Years |
|---|---|---|
| Barneveld | 7 | 1980, 1984, 1988, 1990, 1995, 1996, 1997 |
| Belleville | 6 | 1976, 1981, 1982, 1987, 1988, 1989 |
| New Glarus | 4 | 1982, 1983, 1985, 1986 |
| Pecatonica | 4 | 1992, 1993, 1994, 1995 |
| Black Hawk | 3 | 1984, 1986, 1987 |
| Albany | 0 | |
| Argyle | 0 | |
| Juda | 0 | |
| Monticello | 0 | |
Champions from 1977-1978 unknown

=== Football ===
| School | Quantity | Years |
|---|---|---|
| Belleville | 12 | 1947, 1955, 1956, 1960, 1962, 1963, 1964, 1965, 1971, 1972, 1980, 1982 |
| Blanchardville | 8 | 1950, 1951, 1953, 1954, 1958, 1960, 1961, 1967 |
| Pecatonica | 8 | 1973, 1974, 1975, 1977, 1979, 1983, 1986, 1988 |
| Black Hawk | 6 | 1970, 1972, 1978, 1981, 1984, 1989 |
| New Glarus | 6 | 1952, 1957, 1959, 1966, 1969, 1987 |
| Holy Name Seminary | 4 | 1981, 1985, 1988, 1992 |
| New Glarus/ Monticello | 4 | 1988, 1990, 1991, 1992 |
| (Orfordville) Parkview | 4 | 1949, 1959, 1960, 1968 |
| Argyle | 2 | 1948, 1975 |
| Pecatonica/ Argyle | 2 | 1992, 1993 |
| Brodhead | 1 | 1976 |
| Juda | 1 | 1966 |
| Barneveld | 0 | |
| Beloit Catholic | 0 | |
| Brooklyn | 0 | |
| South Wayne | 0 | |
