= Iowa County League =

Wisconsin high school athletic conference (1927-1960)

The Iowa County League is a former high school athletic conference in southwestern Wisconsin. Originating in 1927 and ending operations in 1960, the conference and its member schools belonged to the Wisconsin Interscholastic Athletic Association.

== History ==
Location of Original Iowa County League Members

The Iowa County League was formed in 1927 by six small high schools in Iowa County: Barneveld, Cobb, Highland, Linden, Rewey and Ridgeway. Montfort joined the league in 1929, bringing the roster to seven schools. In 1939, Livingston became members of the Iowa County League as its eighth member school. It was around this time that the Iowa County League established a tradition of being the first in Wisconsin to start league play each season for basketball. Membership was relatively stable over the conference's history, but rural school district consolidation began to have its effect on the conference in the 1950s. The first change was the consolidation of Rewey into Platteville's school district in 1951. Hollandale moved over from the State Line League to replace them and maintain an eight-school circuit. In 1959, Linden was consolidated into Cobb, one year before they merged with Livingston and Montfort to form the new Iowa-Grant High School. The larger high school left the conference and competed independently for one year before joining the Southwest Wisconsin Activities League in 1961. Faced with a four-member conference for 1960, the Iowa County League merged with the Wisconsin River League, who were experiencing a similar loss of members. The two leagues joined forces to form the I-W League and continue interscholastic league competition.

=== Football ===
In 1950, four members of the Iowa County League (Barneveld, Highland, Livingston and Montfort) formed the initial lineup for the Iowa County League's eight-player football conference, which represented the first of its kind in southern Wisconsin. Blue River and Hollandale joined for the 1951 season; Hollandale as full members outside of football and Blue River as associate members while keeping their primary membership in the Wisconsin River League. Muscoda joined as the football conference's seventh member in 1954 as an associate member from the Wisconsin River League, which did not sponsor football at the time. In 1955, the league expanded to nine members for football, adding Black Earth from the Suburban Six-Man Football League and Lone Rock, who made their football debut that year. The Wisconsin River League began sponsorship of its own eight-player football circuit in 1956, with three members of the Iowa County League (Blue River, Lone Rock and Muscoda) shifting over. They were replaced by Cobb's new football program for that season to put the membership roster at seven schools. In 1958, Arena made the transition from eleven-player to eight-player football and left the Tri-County League to become associate members in the Iowa County League. As smaller schools began to consolidate, the Iowa County League lost members and only five schools (Arena, Barneveld, Black Earth, Highland and Hollandale) competed in its last football season in 1960.

== Conference membership history ==
=== Full members ===
School	Location	Affiliation	Mascot	Colors	Joined	Left	Conference Joined	Current Conference
Barneveld	Barneveld, WI	Public	Golden Eagles		1927	1960	I-W League	Six Rivers
Cobb	Cobb, WI	Public	Kernels		1927	1960	Closed (merged into Iowa-Grant)	
Highland	Highland, WI	Public	Cardinals		1927	1960	I-W League	Six Rivers
Hollandale	Hollandale, WI	Public	Panthers		1951	1960	I-W League	Closed in 1971 (merged into Pecatonica)
Livingston	Livingston, WI	Public	Lions		1939	1960	Closed (merged into Iowa-Grant)	
Montfort	Montfort, WI	Public	Hilltoppers		1929	1960	Closed (merged into Iowa-Grant)	
Ridgeway	Ridgeway, WI	Public	Cardinals		1927	1960	I-W League	Closed in 1962 (consolidated into Dodgeville)

=== Previous members ===
School	Location	Affiliation	Mascot	Colors	Joined	Left	Conference Joined	Current Conference
Linden	Linden, WI	Public	Cornish Miners		1927	1959	Closed (consolidated into Cobb)	
Rewey	Rewey, WI	Public	Rockets		1927	1951	Closed (consolidated into Livingston)	

=== Football-only members ===
School	Location	Affiliation	Mascot	Colors	Seasons	Primary Conference
Blue River	Blue River, WI	Public	Tigers		1951-1955	Wisconsin River
Muscoda	Muscoda, WI	Public	Indians		1954-1955	Wisconsin River
Black Earth	Black Earth, WI	Public	Earthmen		1955-1960	Tri-County
Lone Rock	Lone Rock, WI	Public	Rockets		1955	Wisconsin River
Arena	Arena, WI	Public	Purple Knights		1958-1960	Tri-County

== List of conference champions ==
=== Boys Basketball ===
School	Quantity	Years
Barneveld	12	1931, 1935, 1936, 1937, 1938, 1940, 1942, 1943, 1944, 1945, 1946, 1952
Highland	9	1928, 1929, 1941, 1947, 1953, 1954, 1955, 1957, 1958
Montfort	6	1930, 1933, 1939, 1941, 1959, 1960
Cobb	4	1948, 1949, 1950, 1952
Ridgeway	4	1932, 1934, 1951, 1956
Hollandale	0	
Linden	0	
Livingston	0	
Rewey	0	

=== Football ===
School	Quantity	Years
Highland	5	1951, 1954, 1956, 1957, 1960
Livingston	5	1950, 1952, 1953, 1955, 1959
Montfort	1	1958
Arena	0	
Barneveld	0	
Black Earth	0	
Blue River	0	
Cobb	0	
Hollandale	0	
Lone Rock	0	
Muscoda	0	
