= West Grant League =

Wisconsin high school athletic conference (1930-1960)

The West Grant League is a former high school athletic conference in the southwestern corner of Wisconsin. It was in existence from 1930 to 1960 and all of its members were affiliated with the Wisconsin Interscholastic Athletic Association.

== History ==
Location of West Grant League Members (1939–1959)

The West Grant League was formed in 1930 by six small high schools in western Grant County: Bagley, Bloomington, Cassville, Mount Hope, Patch Grove and Potosi. Cassville left the conference after its first season and rejoined in 1937. They replaced Bagley, who exited the West Grant League that same year and reentered in 1939. Stability among members was maintained for two decades before Cassville and Potosi left to join the Black Hawk League in 1959. The conference continued on for one more season before rural school district consolidation made its continued existence impossible. In 1960, three of the four remaining conference members (Bagley, Mount Hope and Patch Grove) merged to form West Grant High School in Patch Grove, and the new school competed independently for a year before joining the Southwest Wisconsin Athletic League in 1961. Bloomington joined former rivals Cassville and Potosi in the Black Hawk League immediately after the dissolution of the West Grant League.

== Conference membership history ==
=== Final members ===
| School | Location | Affiliation | Mascot | Colors | Joined | Left | Conference Joined | Current Conference |
|---|---|---|---|---|---|---|---|---|
| Bagley | Bagley, WI | Public | Indians | | 1930, 1939 | 1937, 1960 | Closed (merged into West Grant) | |
| Bloomington | Bloomington, WI | Public | Blue Jays | | 1930 | 1960 | Black Hawk | Closed (merged into River Ridge) |
| Mount Hope | Mount Hope, WI | Public | Red Devils | | 1930 | 1960 | Closed (merged into West Grant) | |
| Patch Grove | Patch Grove, WI | Public | Beavers | | 1930 | 1960 | Closed (merged into West Grant) | |

=== Previous members ===
| School | Location | Affiliation | Enrollment | Mascot | Colors | Joined | Left | Conference Joined | Current Conference |
|---|---|---|---|---|---|---|---|---|---|
| Cassville | Cassville, WI | Public | 57 | Comets | | 1930, 1937 | 1931, 1959 | Black Hawk | Six Rivers |
| Potosi | Potosi, WI | Public | 107 | Chieftains | | 1930 | 1959 | Black Hawk | Six Rivers |

== List of conference champions ==
=== Boys Basketball ===
| School | Quantity | Years |
|---|---|---|
| Bloomington | 15 | 1931, 1933, 1936, 1937, 1938, 1940, 1941, 1942, 1943, 1948, 1951, 1952, 1953, 1954, 1960 |
| Patch Grove | 10 | 1935, 1946, 1947, 1949, 1950, 1951, 1952, 1957, 1958, 1959 |
| Cassville | 3 | 1939, 1955, 1956 |
| Bagley | 2 | 1944, 1945 |
| Potosi | 2 | 1936, 1937 |
| Mount Hope | 1 | 1934 |
Champions from 1932 unknown
