= I-W League =

Wisconsin high school athletic conference (1960-1964)

The I-W League is a former high school athletic conference in southwestern Wisconsin. It was founded in 1960 and dissolved in 1964, and the league and its members were affiliated with the Wisconsin Interscholastic Athletic Association.

== History ==
Location of Original I-W League Members

The I-W League, also known by its official name of the Iowa County-Wisconsin River League, was formed in 1960 from the merger of two previously established conferences: the Iowa County League (Barneveld, Highland, Hollandale and Ridgeway) and the Wisconsin River League (Blue River, Ithaca, Lone Rock, Muscoda and Weston). These two conferences were losing members rapidly due to consolidation of rural school districts, and joined forces to continue interscholastic league competition. Ironically, the very same reason this league was created also contributed to its eventual demise. Basketball was the first sport sponsored by the new league, and eight-player football was sponsored for the first time in 1961 with all members participating except for Ridgeway (which did not sponsor football). In 1962, the I-W League lost both Lone Rock and Ridgeway to consolidation. Lone Rock merged with Arena and Spring Green to create the River Valley district, and Ridgeway was folded into Dodgeville's school district. Additionally, three football members joined from the Kickapoo Valley League that fall: Gays Mills, La Farge and Seneca Their time as football-only members was short-lived, as all three schools returned to the Kickapoo Valley League for the 1963 season. The I-W League also lost two more members in 1963, as Highland and Weston left to join the Black Hawk League and Scenic Central Conference, respectively. Left with only five members, the conference continued for one more season before Muscoda left to join the Southwest Wisconsin Athletic League in 1964. The I-W League ended operations in later that year when two of its members (Blue River and Ithaca) joined the Kickapoo Valley League. The two remaining schools (Barneveld and Hollandale) competed as independents for a season before following their I-W League brethren into the Kickapoo Valley League for 1965.

== Conference membership history ==
=== Final members ===
| School | Location | Affiliation | Mascot | Colors | Joined | Left | Conference Joined | Current Conference |
|---|---|---|---|---|---|---|---|---|
| Barneveld | Barneveld, WI | Public | Golden Eagles | | 1960 | 1964 | Independent | Six Rivers |
| Blue River | Blue River, WI | Public | Tigers | | 1960 | 1964 | Kickapoo Valley | Closed in 1967 (merged into Riverdale) |
| Hollandale | Hollandale, WI | Public | Panthers | | 1960 | 1964 | Independent | Closed in 1971 (merged into Pecatonica) |
| Ithaca | Ithaca, WI | Public | Bulldogs | | 1960 | 1964 | Kickapoo Valley | Ridge & Valley |
| Muscoda | Muscoda, WI | Public | Indians | | 1960 | 1964 | SWAL | Closed in 1967 (merged into Riverdale) |

=== Previous members ===
| School | Location | Affiliation | Mascot | Colors | Joined | Left | Conference Joined | Current Conference |
|---|---|---|---|---|---|---|---|---|
| Highland | Highland, WI | Public | Cardinals | | 1960 | 1963 | Black Hawk | Six Rivers |
| Lone Rock | Lone Rock, WI | Public | Rockets | | 1960 | 1962 | Closed (merged into River Valley) | |
| Ridgeway | Ridgeway, WI | Public | Cardinals | | 1960 | 1962 | Closed (consolidated into Dodgeville) | |
| Weston | Cazenovia, WI | Public | Silver Eagles | | 1960 | 1963 | Scenic Central | Ridge & Valley |

=== Football-only members ===
| School | Location | Affiliation | Mascot | Colors | Seasons | Primary Conference |
|---|---|---|---|---|---|---|
| Gays Mills | Gays Mills, WI | Public | Tigers | | 1962 | Kickapoo Valley |
| La Farge | La Farge, WI | Public | Wildcats | | 1962 | Kickapoo Valley |
| Seneca | Seneca, WI | Public | Indians | | 1962 | Kickapoo Valley |

== List of conference champions ==
=== Boys Basketball ===
| School | Quantity | Years |
|---|---|---|
| Barneveld | 2 | 1963, 1964 |
| Highland | 2 | 1962, 1963 |
| Muscoda | 1 | 1961 |
| Blue River | 0 | |
| Hollandale | 0 | |
| Ithaca | 0 | |
| Lone Rock | 0 | |
| Ridgeway | 0 | |
| Weston | 0 | |

=== Football ===
| School | Quantity | Years |
|---|---|---|
| Weston | 2 | 1961, 1963 |
| Barneveld | 1 | 1962 |
| Muscoda | 1 | 1963 |
| Blue River | 0 | |
| Gays Mills | 0 | |
| Highland | 0 | |
| Hollandale | 0 | |
| Ithaca | 0 | |
| La Farge | 0 | |
| Lone Rock | 0 | |
| Seneca | 0 | |
