= Six Rivers Conference =

Wisconsin high school athletic conference

The Six Rivers Conference is a high school athletic conference in Wisconsin, formed in 1997 and consisting of small schools in the southwestern part of the state. All member schools belong to the Wisconsin Interscholastic Athletic Association.

== History ==
The Six Rivers Conference was formed in 1997 through the merger of two smaller conferences in southwestern Wisconsin: the Black Hawk League and the State Line League. It was named after the six rivers located in the conference's catchment area (Mississippi, Grant, Sugar, Platte, Fever and Pecatonica). The conference was originally conceived as an umbrella organization, and its original divisional alignment reflects this:

Black Hawk Division	State Line Division
Belmont	Albany
Benton	Argyle
Cassville	Barneveld
Highland	Belleville
Potosi	Black Hawk
River Ridge	Juda
Shullsburg	Monticello
	New Glarus
	Pecatonica

After the first two seasons, the league realigned itself into two eight-member divisions. Pecatonica joined with the other Black Hawk Division schools in the Western Division while the remainder of the State Line Division schools comprised the new Eastern Division:

Eastern Division	Western Division
Albany	Belmont
Argyle	Benton
Barneveld	Cassville
Belleville	Highland
Black Hawk	Pecatonica
Juda	Potosi
Monticello	River Ridge
New Glarus	Shullsburg

This alignment remained in place until 2006, when the two largest schools in the conference (Belleville and New Glarus) left the Six Rivers to join more similarly-sized schools the Capitol Conference. Pecatonica rejoined their State Line League brethren in the conference's Eastern Division to create two seven-member divisions in an alignment that continues to this day:

Eastern Division	Western Division
Albany	Belmont
Argyle	Benton
Barneveld	Cassville
Black Hawk	Highland
Juda	Potosi
Monticello	River Ridge
Pecatonica	Shullsburg

=== Football ===
Because of the size of the Six River Conference's member schools, there are a large number of cooperative programs in certain sports, especially football. The Six Rivers has sponsored football since its inception in 1997, and all of the original members belonged to the Black Hawk League for football in the previous season. Most of the members of the State Line League that sponsored football had cooperative agreements with schools in larger conferences (i.e. Brodhead-Juda, Mount Horeb-Barneveld, New Glarus-Monticello) and did not participate with the exception of Black Hawk and Pecatonica/Argyle. For the 2000 season, Belleville/Albany and New Glarus/Monticello moved over from the Capitol Conference, where three of the schools (Belleville, Monticello and New Glarus) had previously played as the Sugar River Raiders football cooperative. This arrangement only lasted one season, as both programs moved to the new Trailways Conference for the 2001 football season. By the end of the 2010s, several programs had entered into cooperative agreements (Potosi and Cassville in 2017, Benton/Scales Mound and Shullsburg in 2019) which coupled with Belmont's transition to eight-player football and Highland's move to the Ridge & Valley Conference dwindled conference membership to five schools. Boscobel and Southwestern entered as football-only members from the Southwest Wisconsin Activities League to replace the lost members for the 2019 football season.

In February 2019, in conjunction with the Wisconsin Football Coaches Association, the WIAA released a sweeping football-only realignment for Wisconsin to commence with the 2020 football season and run on a two-year cycle. Boscobel left to join the Ridge & Valley Conference with Iowa-Grant shifting from the SWAL to take their place. The Six Rivers and SWAL also entered into a scheduling partnership since both conferences only had seven members. For the 2022-2023 competition cycle, Iowa-Grant moved to the Ridge & Valley Conference, and both the Six Rivers Conference and SWAL competed with six members each. Southwestern High School in Hazel Green also entered into a cooperative agreement with East Dubuque High School in Illinois to run a joint football program. In 2024, Riverdale and Seneca/Wauzeka-Steuben joined from the Ridge & Valley Conference, replacing outgoing members Benton/Scales Mound/Shullsburg and Southwestern/East Dubuque, both of which went to the SWAL for football. The return of Boscobel and Iowa-Grant to the conference brought football membership up to eight schools. This alignment is set to remain through at least the 2026-2027 realignment cycle.

== List of member schools ==
=== Current full members ===
School	Location	Affiliation	Enrollment	Mascot	Colors	Joined	Division
Albany	Albany, WI	Public	70	Comets		1997	Eastern
Argyle	Argyle, WI	Public	88	Orioles		1997	Eastern
Barneveld	Barneveld, WI	Public	127	Golden Eagles		1997	Eastern
Belmont	Belmont, WI	Public	98	Braves		1997	Western
Benton	Benton, WI	Public	62	Zephyrs		1997	Western
Black Hawk	South Wayne, WI	Public	98	Warriors		1997	Eastern
Cassville	Cassville, WI	Public	58	Comets		1997	Western
Highland	Highland, WI	Public	73	Cardinals		1997	Western
Juda	Juda, WI	Public	77	Panthers		1997	Eastern
Monticello	Monticello, WI	Public	93	Ponies		1997	Eastern
Pecatonica	Blanchardville, WI	Public	119	Vikings		1997	Eastern
Potosi	Potosi, WI	Public	91	Chieftains		1997	Western
River Ridge	Patch Grove, WI	Public	148	Timberwolves		1997	Western
Shullsburg	Shullsburg, WI	Public	118	Miners		1997	Western

=== Current associate members ===
School	Location	Affiliation	Mascot	Colors	Primary Conference	Sport(s)
Boscobel	Boscobel, WI	Public	Bulldogs		SWAL	Football
Iowa-Grant	Livingston, WI	Public	Panthers		SWAL	Football
Riverdale	Muscoda, WI	Public	Chieftains		SWAL	Football

=== Current co-operative members ===
Team	Colors	Host School	Co-operative Members	Sport(s)
BSMS Knights		Benton	Scales Mound (IL), Shullsburg	Boys Track & Field, Girls Track & Field
SWS Blue-Golds		Wauzeka-Steuben	Seneca	Football

=== Former full members ===
School	Location	Affiliation	Mascot	Colors	Joined	Left	Conference Joined	Current Conference
Belleville	Belleville, WI	Public	Wildcats		1997	2006	Capitol	
New Glarus	New Glarus, WI	Public	Glarner Knights		1997	2006	Capitol	

=== Former football-only members ===
School	Location	Affiliation	Mascot	Colors	Seasons	Primary Conference
Southwestern	Hazel Green, WI	Public	Wildcats		2019-2021	SWAL
Southwestern/East Dubuque	Hazel Green, WI & East Dubuque, IL	Public	WarCats		2022-2023	SWAL, Northwest Upstate Illini (IHSA)

== Membership timeline ==
=== Full members ===
Black Hawk Division State Line Division Eastern Division Western Division

=== Football members ===
Large Schools Small Schools

== Membership map ==
Six Rivers Conference
Location of Six Rivers Conference full members:
1 Albany
2 Argyle
3 Barneveld
4 Belmont
5 Benton
6 Black Hawk
7 Cassville
8 Highland
9 Juda
10 Monticello
11 Pecatonica
12 Potosi
13 River Ridge
14 Shullsburg

== Sponsored sports ==
	Baseball	Boys Basketball	Girls Basketball	Football	Softball	Boys Track & Field	Girls Track & Field	Girls Volleyball	Boys Wrestling (Note: Co-sponsored with the Ridge & Valley Conference and Scenic Bluffs Conference)	Girls Wrestling
Albany			● (Note: Co-operative with Monticello)			●	●	●		
Argyle	● (Note: Co-operative with Black Hawk)	●	● (Note: Co-operative with Pecatonica)		●	●	●	●		
Barneveld	●	●	●		●			●		
Belmont	●	●	●		●	●	●	●		
Benton		●	●		● (Note: Co-operative with Shullsburg)	● (Note: BSMS Knights co-operative)	●	●		
Black Hawk		●	●	● (Note: Co-operative with Warren (IL))		●	●	●		
Cassville						● (Note: Co-operative ith Potosi)	●	●		
Highland		●	●		●			●		
Juda		●	●		● (Note: Co-operative with Albany)			●		
Monticello	●	●			● (Note: Co-operative with New Glarus)			●		
Pecatonica	●	●		● (Note: Co-operative with Argyle)	●			●	●	●
Potosi	● (Note: Co-operative with Cassville)	●	●	●	●			●		
River Ridge	●	●	●	●	●	●	●	●	●	●
Shullsburg	● (Note: Co-operative with Benton)	●	●					●		

== List of state champions ==
=== Fall sports ===
Girls Cross Country
School	Year	Division
Albany	2000	Division 3

Football
School	Year	Division
Black Hawk	2013	Division 7
Black Hawk	2018	Division 7
Black Hawk/ Warren (IL)	2019	Division 7

Girls Volleyball
School	Year	Division
Potosi	2002	Division 4
Highland	2010	Division 4

=== Winter sports ===
Boys Basketball
School	Year	Division
Cassville	2000	Division 4
Barneveld	2017	Division 5

Girls Basketball
School	Year	Division
Barneveld	1998	Division 4
Barneveld	1999	Division 4
Barneveld	2005	Division 4
Benton	2009	Division 4
Barneveld	2014	Division 5
Barneveld	2015	Division 5
Black Hawk	2019	Division 5
Albany/ Monticello	2024	Division 5

=== Spring sports ===
Softball
School	Year	Division
Belmont	2002	Division 4
Highland	2006	Division 4
Juda/ Albany	2017	Division 4
Belmont	2019	Division 5

Girls Track & Field
School	Year	Division
Benton/ Scales Mound/ Shullsburg	2018	Division 3

== List of conference champions ==
=== Boys Basketball ===
School	Quantity	Years
Barneveld	18	2001, 2003, 2005, 2006, 2007, 2009, 2010, 2011, 2012, 2014, 2016, 2017, 2018, 2019, 2023, 2024, 2025, 2026
Monticello	8	1999, 2004, 2009, 2010, 2011, 2020, 2021, 2022
River Ridge	8	2003, 2005, 2006, 2020, 2021, 2022, 2023, 2025
Benton	7	2003, 2007, 2008, 2009, 2010, 2011, 2012
Potosi	7	2001, 2002, 2018, 2019, 2023, 2024, 2025
Black Hawk	6	1998, 2000, 2003, 2008, 2013, 2014
Belmont	4	2003, 2004, 2005, 2026
Cassville	4	1998, 1999, 2000, 2014
Shullsburg	4	1999, 2015, 2016, 2017
Pecatonica	3	2002, 2015, 2018
Highland	2	2002, 2025
New Glarus	1	2005
Albany	0	
Argyle	0	
Belleville	0	
Juda	0	

=== Girls Basketball ===
School	Quantity	Years
Barneveld	15	1998, 1999, 2000, 2001, 2003, 2004, 2005, 2006, 2007, 2009, 2012, 2013, 2014, 2015, 2016
Black Hawk	11	2003, 2009, 2010, 2011, 2012, 2017, 2018, 2019, 2020, 2021, 2022
Potosi	11	1998, 1999, 2000, 2001, 2002, 2007, 2008, 2009, 2012, 2013, 2018
River Ridge	9	2004, 2005, 2006, 2007, 2010, 2011, 2014, 2019, 2020
Belmont	4	2012, 2022, 2023, 2025
Shullsburg	4	2016, 2017, 2021, 2026
Albany	3	2002, 2022, 2023
Highland	3	2011, 2022, 2024
Pecatonica	3	2000, 2007, 2008
Albany/ Monticello	2	2025, 2026
Benton/ Shullsburg	2	2013, 2015
Pecatonica/ Argyle	2	2024, 2026
Argyle	0	
Belleville	0	
Benton	0	
Cassville	0	
Juda	0	
Monticello	0	
New Glarus	0	
Potosi/ Cassville	0	

=== Football ===
School	Quantity	Years
Pecatonica/ Argyle	12	1997, 1998, 1999, 2000, 2002, 2003, 2004, 2005, 2006, 2008, 2015, 2016
Potosi	6	2008, 2009, 2010, 2011, 2012, 2014
Potosi/ Cassville	6	2020, 2021, 2022, 2023, 2024, 2026
Black Hawk	5	2001, 2007, 2013, 2017, 2018
River Ridge	4	2004, 2021, 2022, 2026
Black Hawk/ Warren	3	2019, 2023, 2025
Highland	2	2000, 2011
Belmont	1	2004
Benton/ Scales Mound	1	2008
Iowa-Grant	1	2026
Belleville/ Albany	0	
Benton/ Scales Mound/ Shullsburg	0	
Boscobel	0	
Cassville	0	
New Glarus/ Monticello	0	
Riverdale	0	
Seneca/ Wauzeka-Steuben	0	
Shullsburg	0	
Southwestern	0	
Southwestern/ East Dubuque	0	
