= Blanchard, Wisconsin =

- Town
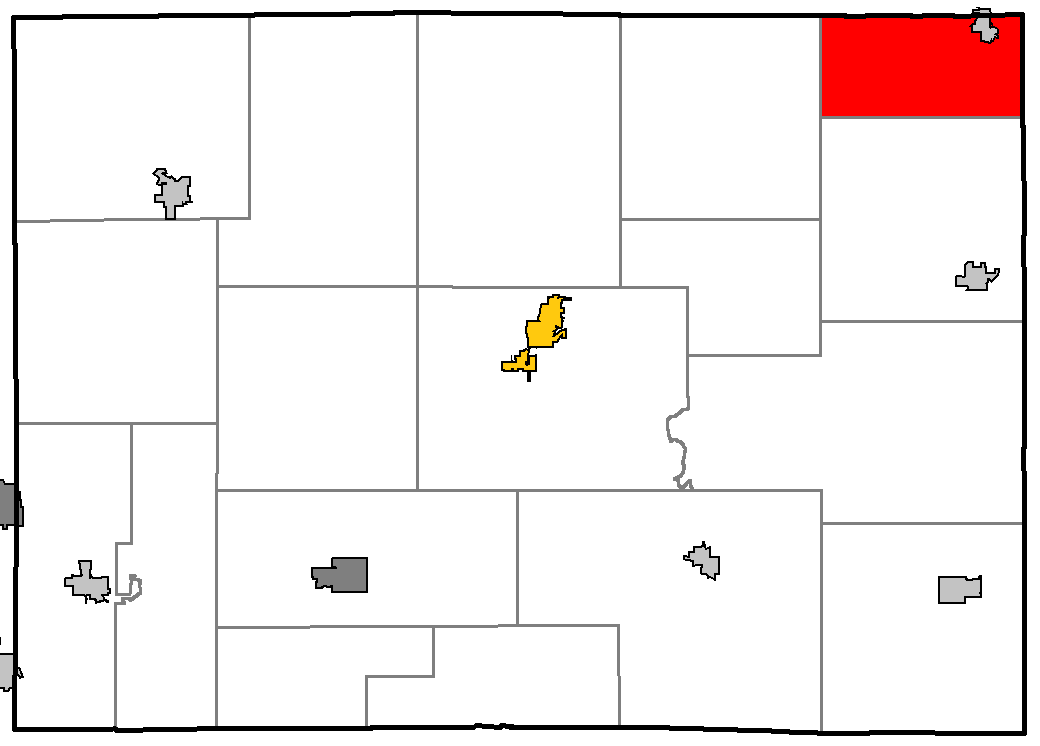
- Location of Blanchard, within Lafayette County, Wisconsin

- Location of Lafayette County, Wisconsin
- Coordinates: 42°47′36″N 89°53′20″W
- Country: United States
- State: Wisconsin
- County: Lafayette

Area
  - Total: 17.56 sq mi (45.47 km^{2})
  - Land: 17.53 sq mi (45.41 km^{2})
  - Water: 0.023 sq mi (0.06 km^{2})
- Elevation: 925 ft (282 m)

Population (2020)
  - Total: 300
  - Density: 17/sq mi (6.6/km^{2})
- Time zone: UTC-6 (Central (CST))
  - Summer (DST): UTC-5 (CDT)
- ZIP Code: 53516 (Blanchardville)
- Area code: 608
- FIPS code: 55-08100
- GNIS feature ID: 1582827

Blanchard is a town in Lafayette County, Wisconsin, United States. The population was 300 at the 2020 census. The town was founded in the 1840s by a branch of the Church of Jesus Christ of Latter Day Saints led by James Jesse Strang. It was named for Alvin Blanchard, who jointly owned the site along with Cyrus Newkirk.

== Geography ==
Blanchard occupies the northeastern corner of Lafayette County. It is bordered to the north by Iowa County and to the east by Green County. The village of Blanchardville is in the northeastern part of the town.

According to the United States Census Bureau, the town has a total area of 17.6 square miles (45.5 km^{2}), of which 0.02 square miles (0.06 km^{2}), or 0.12%, are water. The East Branch Pecatonica River flows southward through the eastern side of the town.

== Demographics ==
Historical population
Census	Pop.	Note	%±
2000	261		—
2010	264		1.1%
2020	300		13.6%

As of the census of 2000, there were 261 people, 96 households, and 74 families residing in the town. The population density was 14.9 people per square mile (5.8/km^{2}). There were 103 housing units at an average density of 5.9 per square mile (2.3/km^{2}). The racial makeup of the town was 98.47% White, 0.38% from other races, and 1.15% from two or more races. Hispanic or Latino of any race were 0.38% of the population.

There were 96 households, out of which 35.4% had children under the age of 18 living with them, 71.9% were married couples living together, 3.1% had a female householder with no husband present, and 21.9% were non-families. 16.7% of all households were made up of individuals, and 9.4% had someone living alone who was 65 years of age or older. The average household size was 2.72 and the average family size was 3.04.

In the town, the population was spread out, with 27.2% under the age of 18, 6.5% from 18 to 24, 32.6% from 25 to 44, 19.5% from 45 to 64, and 14.2% who were 65 years of age or older. The median age was 37 years. For every 100 females, there were 97.7 males. For every 100 females age 18 and over, there were 106.5 males.

The median income for a household in the town was $48,068, and the median income for a family was $48,295. Males had a median income of $28,472 versus $22,344 for females. The per capita income for the town was $20,160. About 2.5% of families and 3.1% of the population were below the poverty line, including none of those under the age of eighteen and 10.3% of those 65 or over.

== Notable people ==
- Melvin Olson, farmer, businessman, and legislator
