= Belmont High School (Wisconsin) =

Coordinates: 42.74196953°N 90.32643556°W

- 646 Liberty Street; Belmont, WI 53510

Information
- Type: Public
- Teaching staff: 15.33 (FTE)
- Grades: 6-12
- Enrollment: 163 (2023-2024)
- Student to teacher ratio: 10.63
- Color
- Team name: Braves
- Website: http://www.belmont.k12.wi.us/

Belmont High School is a public high school located in Belmont, Wisconsin that serves students in grades 9 through 12. The school had an enrollment of 130 students in the 2006-2007 school year in a building that houses K-12. High school students attend classes in a new addition built in 2001, with classes for the K-8 students held in the older section. A gymnasium was also included in the new addition.

== Athletics ==
The school's nickname is the Belmont Braves. With a low enrollment of 108, Belmont is in Division 7 for the WIAA state football playoffs. The school also offers other athletic opportunities, including volleyball, girls' basketball, boys' basketball, wrestling, track and field, baseball, and softball. Athletic teams compete in the Six Rivers Conference.

=== Softball ===
Belmont High School is most known for its girls' fastpitch softball team. Since 2001, the Lady Braves carry a record of 169-55 (.754 winning percentage). The team won the WIAA Division 4 State Championship in 2002 (25-1 overall record), and was WIAA Division 4 State Runner-Up in 2003 (20-6) and 2006 (18-8). They also advanced to state in 2009 (23-6), losing in the Division 4 semifinals to Oakfield, the eventual state champion. Since 2001, they have advanced to the WIAA State Tournament four times, and to the sectionals in seven of the last nine years, appearing in six of the last nine sectional finals. The Lady Braves also advanced to the WIAA State Tournament as a Division 3 team in 1999 before losing their first game there.

=== Athletic conference affiliation history ===
- Black Hawk League (1930-1997)
- Six Rivers Conference (1997–present)
