= Melvin Olson =

American politician

Melvin Olson (May 18, 1887 – July 18, 1962) was a member of the Wisconsin State Senate.

Olson was born in Blanchard, Wisconsin. He later moved to South Wayne, Wisconsin. Olson was a farmer, store owner, and a farm implement and supply dealer. He served on the high school board. Olson died in Monroe, Wisconsin.

== Career ==
Olson was a member of the Senate representing the 17th district from 1943 to 1954. Additionally, he was Village President, Village Treasurer and Assessor of South Wayne, as well as a delegate to the 1948 Republican National Convention.
