= Jennie O'Neill Potter =

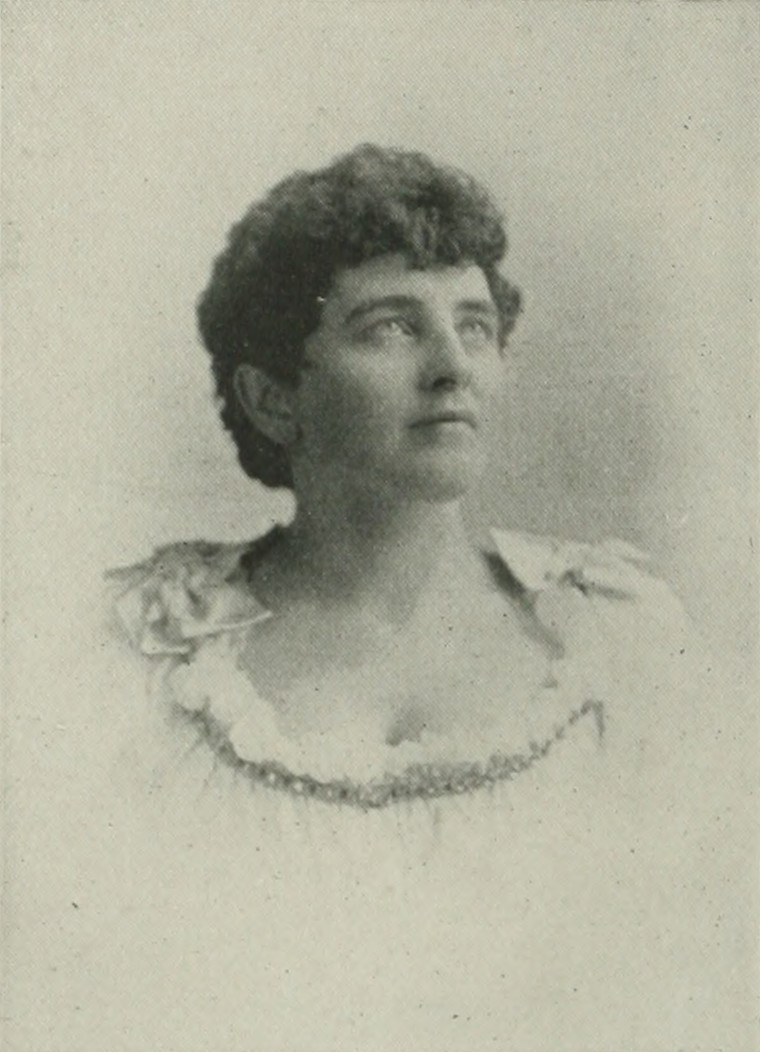
- Portrait photo from A Woman of the Century
- Born: Jennie O'Neill or Jennie O'Neil; 1867; Patch Grove, Wisconsin, U.S.
- Died: April 17, 1900; New York City
- Occupations: actor; dramatic reader
- Spouse: Charles W. Potter (m. 1880)

Jennie O'Neill Potter (1867–1900) was an American actor and dramatic reader. King Edward VII, then the Prince of Wales, called Potter "the queen of dialect readers".

== Early life and education ==
Jennie O'Neill (or O'Neil) was born in Patch Grove, Wisconsin, in 1867. Her father, Thomas, was an impecunious cadet of an Irish family, who took his English wife, Elizabeth, to settle in the State of Wisconsin, where Jennie was born and raised. She had six siblings, all brothers.

When Potter was about ten years of age, a lodge of Good Templars was organized in the neighborhood, and the child became a charter member, resolving to become a temperance reformer.

At a very early age, Potter read Shakespeare. She had never been inside of a theater, but she had read about the plays as they were put upon the stage. She recited for churches, picnics and Fourth of July celebrations. As a performer, she was entirely self-made, devoting herself to the study of her profession from a business-like point of view.

== Career ==
On June 10, 1880, she married Charles W. Potter. They had two children, Davie and May. Faced with financial difficulties which her husband could not overcome, he went to the gold fields of Montana to seek his fortunes, and there died.

It was not until she found herself with two children to support, and had tried other means of livelihood, that she began to think of turning her histrionic gifts into a career. Till now, she had only recited spontaneously, without any instruction.

She had sometimes recited at a Post of the Grand Army of the Republic (GAR), and she reasoned that if she could prepare something especially suitable to be given at such meetings, one Post would recommend her to another, and she could continue making engagements. She would style herself "The Daughter of the Regiment" and would recite "Sheridan's Ride" and other patriotic poems. Needing a suitable costume, she made a gown of red, white and blue, purchased a short sword to wear at her side, a canteen at her back, a broad sash to further adorn the look, and a soldier's cap. She practised her repertoire for hours daily, until she felt fully prepared to perform. Then she called upon some members of the GAR Post in the town where she lived, told what she had done, and begged a hearing.

Shortly after, under their auspices, she received her first earnings as a reader. As she had anticipated, engagements were made with other Posts, and small earnings obtained. She was made the guest of the GAR of Minnesota, and was taken by them to the encampment of the GAR at Columbus, Ohio, where she appeared as the "Daughter of the Regiment". She now recited whenever there was a money to earn or a newspaper notice to be obtained.

She gave lessons in elocution, all in her own way, whenever a pupil could be found. She never copied other people and seldom did what was expected of her. She did not earn much at the time but it was sufficient to cover the bare necessities for herself and the children.

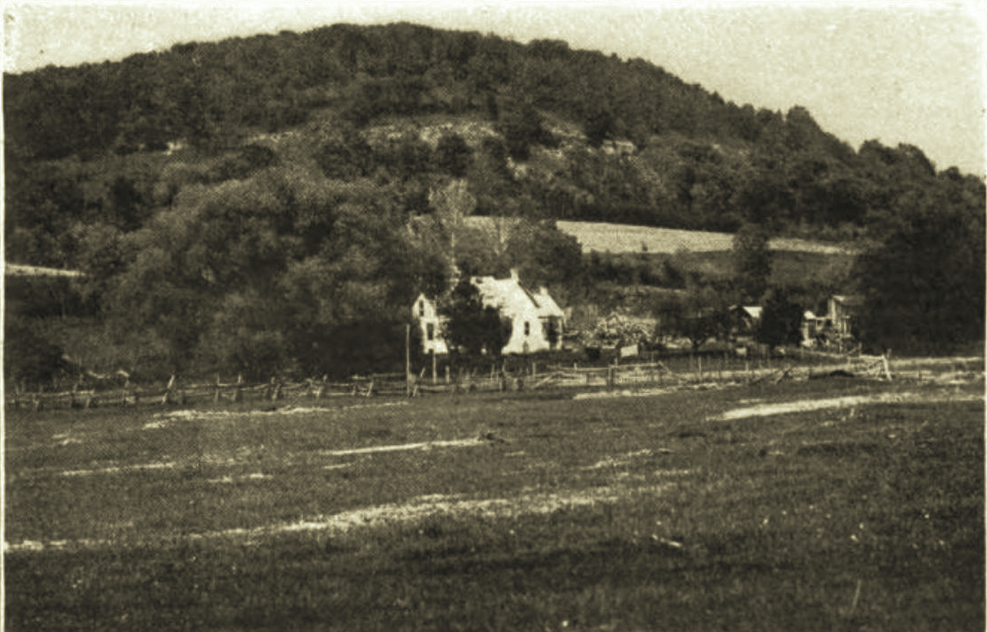
Homestead at Patch Grove, Wisconsin

After May died while still a baby, Potter took Davie with her to the family's homestead farm at Patch Grove. But not long after, she begged her father and brothers to advance her money so that she could travel to New York City and make a career. Her professional life began after she reached that city.

Her talent attracted the attention of Major James Pond, under whose direction she subsequently undertook her first tour throughout the eastern States. She became a favorite in Washington society, introduced by Augusta E. Mulkey (Mrs. Senator Joseph N. Dolph), and patronized by the Postmaster-General.

In London, bearing letters of introduction from a number of the prominent social leaders and press representatives in the U.S., she was warmly welcomed by Katherine Duer Mackay, Fanny Ronalds, Mrs. John Wood and other representatives of American society in the British metropolis. During her first season, Potter became a general favorite in the circles where she was invited to give her readings. Among Potter's English patrons were the Duke and Duchess of Newcastle, Lord and Lady Londerborough, Baroness Lionel de Rothschild, and Lady Goldsmid. "Flirts and Matrons," by Robert G. Morris, the playwright; "Orange Blossoms" and "A Letter from Home", were written by Townsend. These three monologues were copyrighted and belonged to Potter.

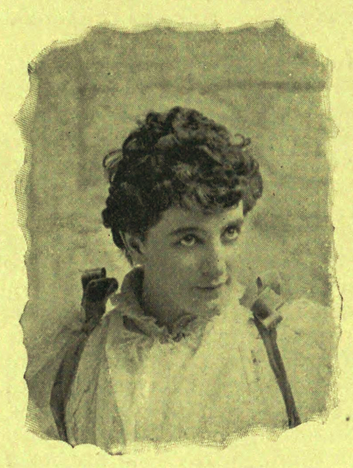
(1894)

Several of Potter's poems were published in the Texas Siftings. Her "The Monologue as an Entertainment", read by invitation at the woman's section of the World's Columbian Exposition (1893), was included in The Congress of Women (1894).

== Personal life ==
Potter was a member of the Methodist Church.

At the end of 1899, she hemorrhaged at her apartment in New York City and was hospitalized. Jennie O'Neill Potter died of cancer at St. Luke's Hospital, April 17, 1900.

Her biographer, Anna T. Randall Diehl, published The Story of Jennie O'Neil Potter in 1901.

== Selected works ==
- "The Monologue as an Entertainment", The Congress of Women: Held in the Woman's Building, World's Columbian Exposition, Chicago, U.S.A., 1893, with Portraits, Biographies and Addresses (1894) (text)

== Gallery ==
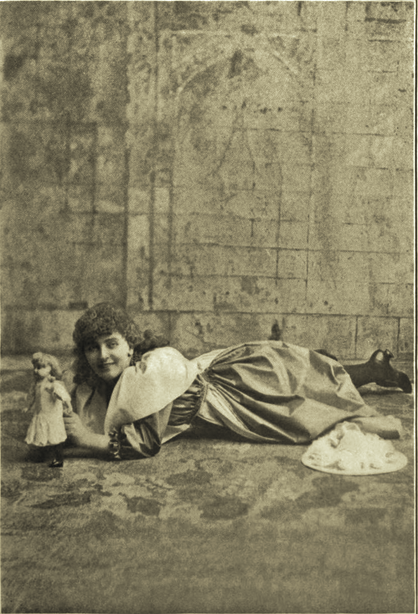
"Flirts and Matrons", Opening Scene

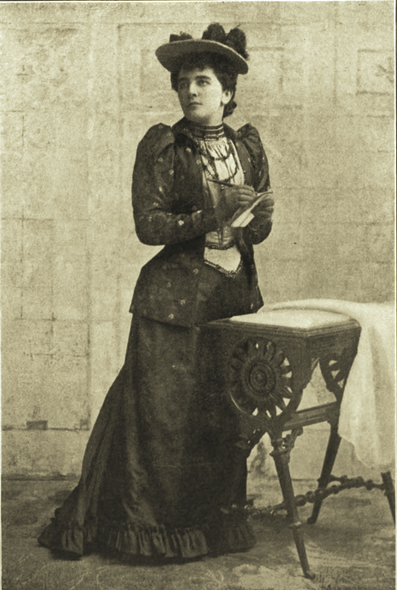
"Flirts and Matrons", Filling engagements for club work

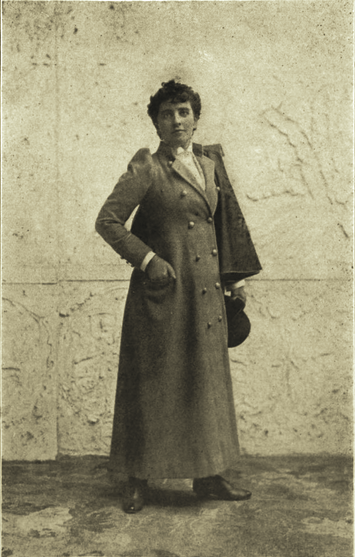
"Flirts and Matrons", The College Girl

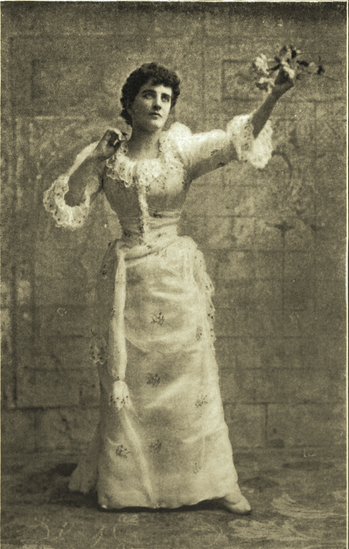
"Flirts and Matrons", The Debutante

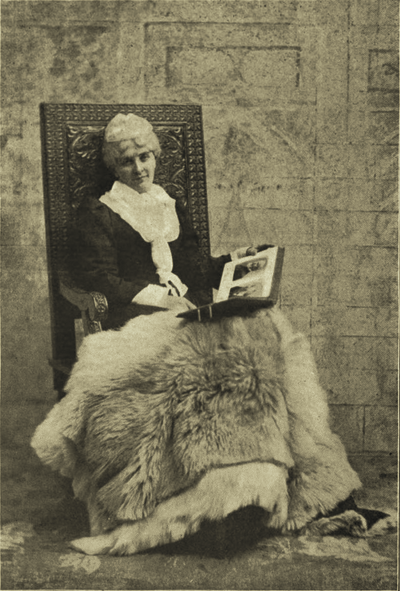
"Flirts and Matrons", The Grandmother

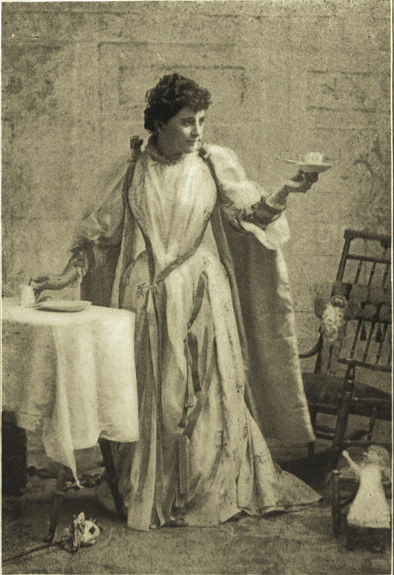
"Flirts and Matrons", The Young Mother in the Nursery

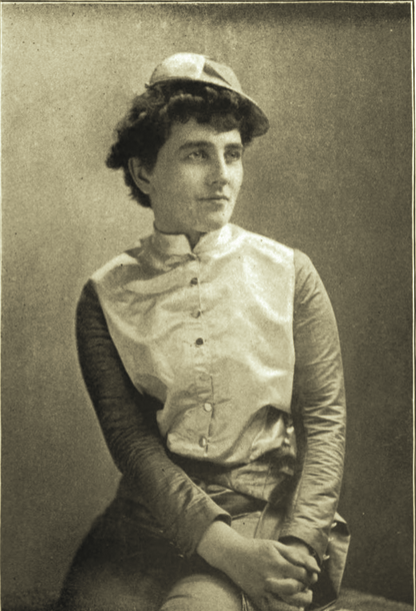
"Salvatore", The Jockey
