= Patch Grove (town), Wisconsin =

Town in Grant County, Wisconsin

Patch Grove, Wisconsin
- Town
- Town of Patch Grove
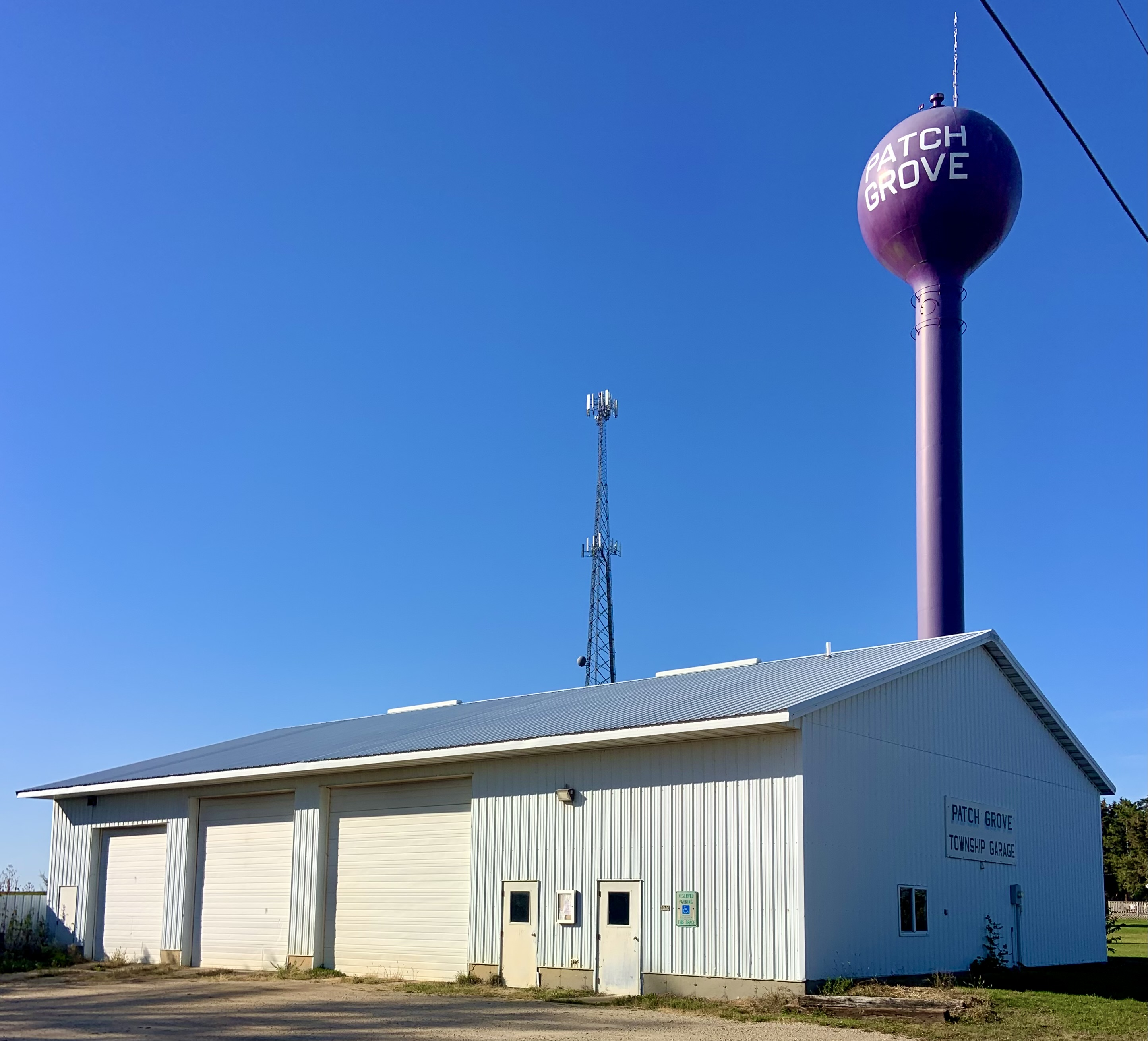
- Patch Grove Town Hall

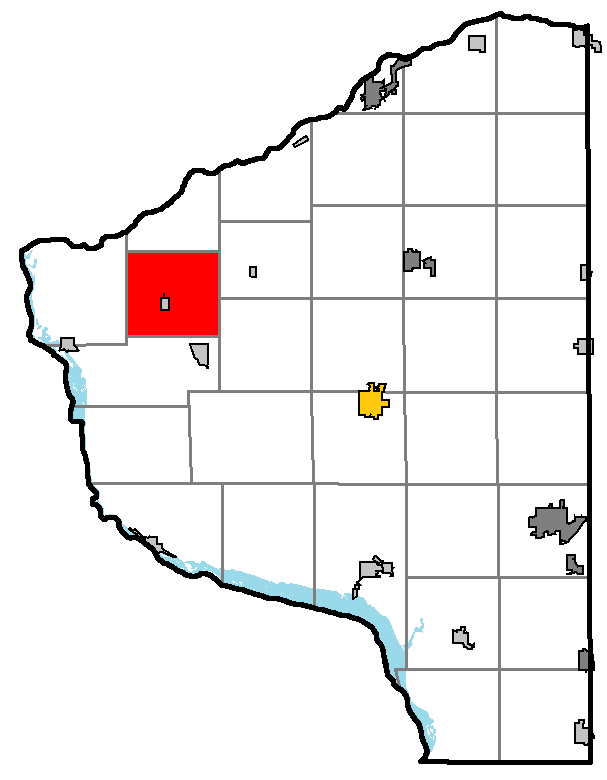
- Location of Patch Grove within Grant County, Wisconsin

- Location of Grant County, Wisconsin
- Coordinates: 42°56′57″N 90°57′45″W
- Country: United States
- State: Wisconsin
- County: Grant

Area
  - Total: 32.96 sq mi (85.4 km^{2})
  - Land: 32.96 sq mi (85.4 km^{2})
  - Water: 0 sq mi (0 km^{2})

Population (2020)
  - Total: 364
  - Density: 11.0/sq mi (4.26/km^{2})
- Time zone: UTC-6 (Central (CST))
  - Summer (DST): UTC-5 (CDT)
- ZIP Code: 53817
- Area code(s): 608 and 353
- GNIS feature ID: 1583900

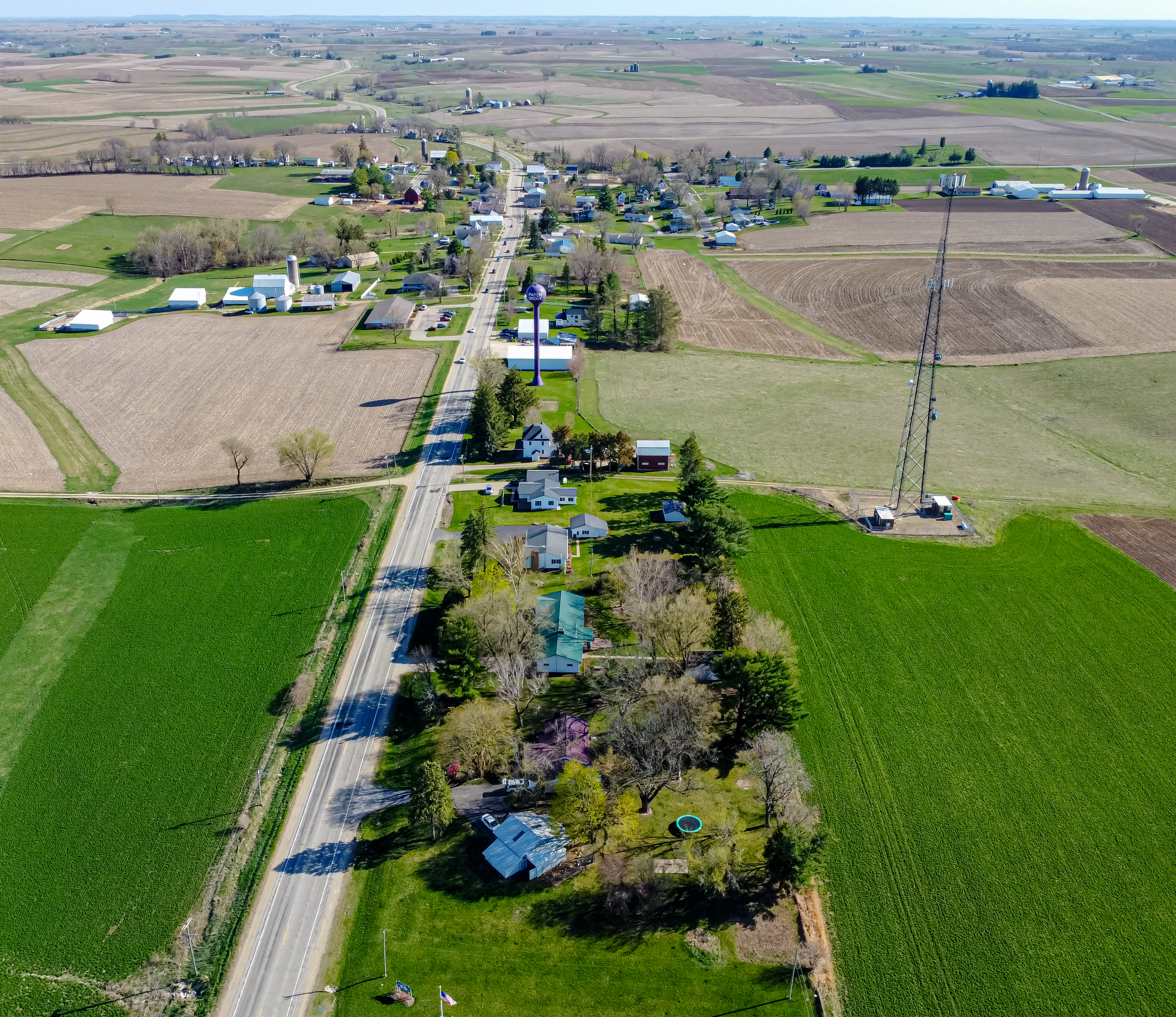
Village of Patch Grove, Wisconsin and surrounding area

Patch Grove is a town in Grant County, Wisconsin, United States. The population was 364 at the 2020 United States census. Patch Grove Village is located within the Town of Patch Grove.

== History ==
Little is known about the early history of the town. In 1836, Henry Patch arrived, who built a house. The place became known as Patch's Grove. Around that time, a post office was built while Patch occupied the land, making him the first postmaster.

== Geography ==
According to the United States Census Bureau, the town has a total area of 32.9 square miles (85.1 km^{2}), all land.

== Demographics ==
At the 2000 United States census there were 390 people, 135 households, and 105 families living in the town. The population density was 11.9 people per square mile (4.6/km^{2}). There were 148 housing units at an average density of 4.5 per square mile (1.7/km^{2}). The racial makeup of the town was 100.00% White. 0.00% of the population were Hispanic or Latino of any race. Of the 135 households 37.8% had children under the age of 18 living with them, 72.6% were married couples living together, 1.5% had a female householder with no husband present, and 21.5% were non-families. 15.6% of households were one person and 5.9% were one person aged 65 or older. The average household size was 2.89 and the average family size was 3.25.

The age distribution was 30.0% under the age of 18, 7.2% from 18 to 24, 30.8% from 25 to 44, 21.0% from 45 to 64, and 11.0% 65 or older. The median age was 37 years. For every 100 females, there were 113.1 males. For every 100 females age 18 and over, there were 123.8 males.

The median household income was $38,281 and the median family income was $40,781. Males had a median income of $27,266 versus $19,773 for females. The per capita income for the town was $16,527. About 10.7% of families and 10.9% of the population were below the poverty line, including 5.1% of those under age 18 and 15.7% of those age 65 or over.
