= Monticello High School (Wisconsin) =

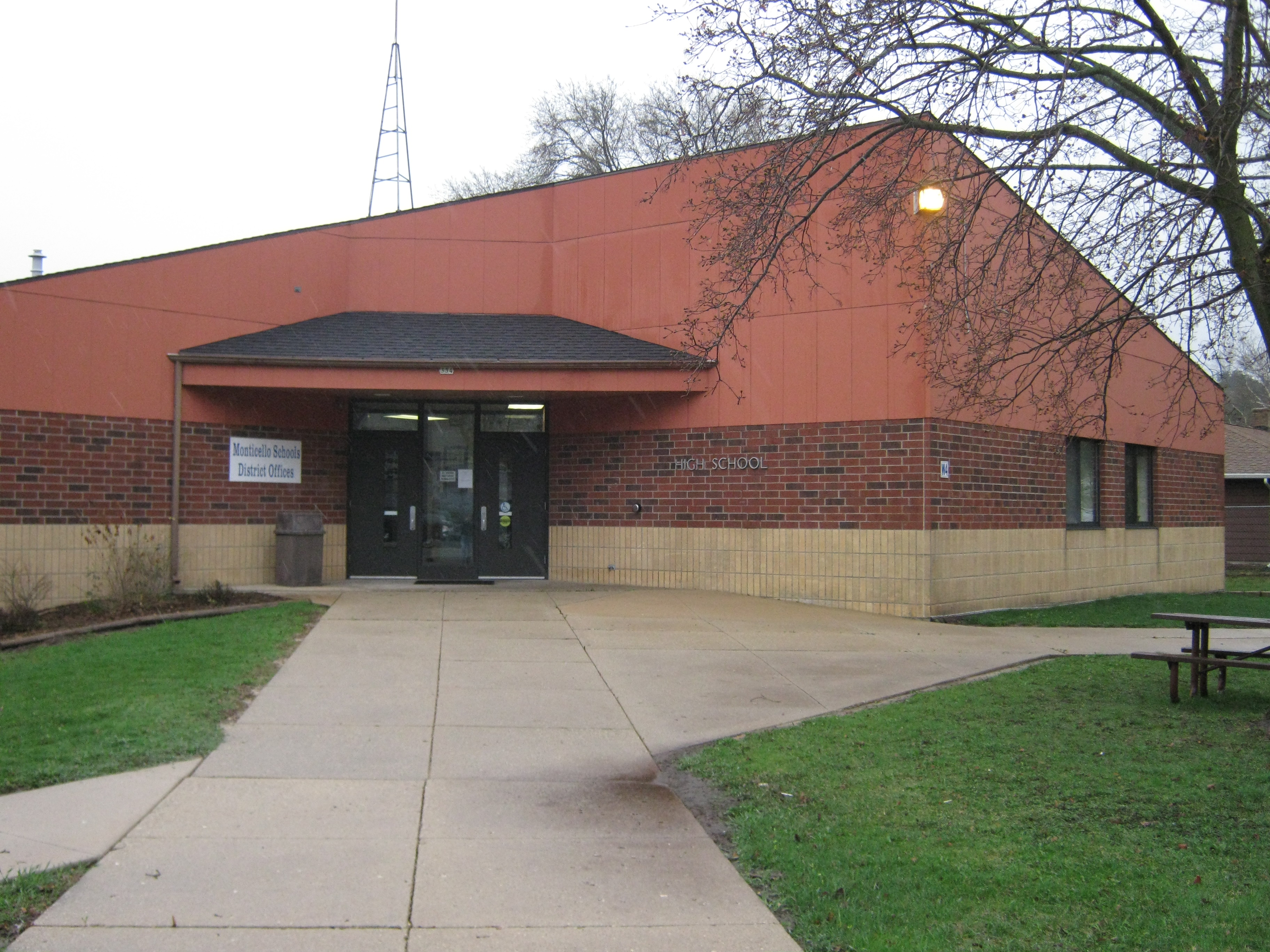
- Monticello High School

Location
- 334 South Main Street; Monticello, Wisconsin 53570; United States; 42.742710°N 89.593720°W

Information
- School type: Public high school
- Principal: Chris Pickett
- Staff: 10.24 (FTE)
- Grades: 9-12
- Enrollment: 88 (2023-2024)
- Student to teacher ratio: 8.59
- Campus: Rural
- Colors: Royal blue and white
- Athletics conference: Six Rivers East
- Mascot: Pony
- Website: School website

Monticello High School is a rural public high school located in Monticello, Wisconsin in Green County, Wisconsin.

== School history ==
The original school house was built in 1902, on the north end of town. In 1912 it was decided to build a new school closer to the center of the town. It was completed in 1913 and was built where the current one is. The first yearbook was printed in 1927 and the principal at the time was Mr. Corydon L. Rich. The first graduating class to wear caps and gowns was the class of 1932. The elementary wing was added in 1958, along with the now named Rehmstedt Gym. It is named after Mr. Rehmsted, who donated $32,000 to the school. In 1980 the original school building was demolished and replaced with the current high school office and rooms, the Rhemsted gym flooded that year right before the school year started and part of the gym was unusable. In 1996 a new gym which is called the Elmer Lemon Gym, computer labs, and music rooms were added.

== Administration ==
- Mr. Chris Pickett is Monticello's current principal.
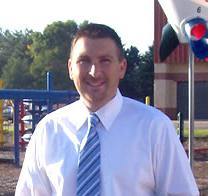
  Allen Brokopp, the current superintendent
- Mr. Allen Brokopp is Monticello's current district administrator effective January 9, 2019

=== Past principals ===
- Mr. Mark Gustafson (2013-2025)
- Mr. Allen Brokopp (2009-2013)
- Mrs. Susan McGuire (2009)
- Mr. Kenneth Colle (2001–2009)
- Mrs. Susan Halseth (1999–2000)
- Mr. Joel Espe (1993–1998)
- Mr. William Greiner (1989–1992)
- Mr. Haasl (1984–1988)
- Mr. Ben Campa (1982–1983)
- Mr. Brad Colton (1981-1981)
- Mr. John Kammerud (1977–1980)
- Mr. Leonard Cisewski (1974–1976)
- Mr. Barnes (1972–1973)
- Mr. Nelson (1971–1972)
- Mr. Larson (1969–1970)
- Mr. F. C. Rehmstedt (1961–1968)
- Mr. Herman Becker (1932–1960)
- Mr. Corydon L. Rich (1927)
- Mr. M. T. Rodda (1916)
- Mr. Dwight Flowers (1907)

== Mascot ==
Monticello's mascot is the Pony. It is inspired by John Ponyicsanyi, a former basketball coach and high school Business Education teacher. He has since been elected into the Wisconsin Basketball Coach's Association Hall of Fame.

== Athletics and extracurricular activities ==
Monticello High School's athletics program offers Varsity Football, Basketball, Volleyball, Baseball, Softball, Cross Country, Track and Field, Wrestling. Monticello High School also offers Band, Choir, FFA, FCCLA, and FBLA.

Monticello participates in the Six Rivers East Conference formerly the State Line League. The other members of the Six Rivers East Conference are Juda, Pecatonica, Black Hawk, Albany, Argyle, Barneveld. Monticello co-ops with the New Glarus School District in the sports of Cross Country, Football, and wrestling, which includes Belleville. For these co-op sports they compete in the Capital Conference South, which includes Marshall, Cambridge, Wisconsin Heights, Waterloo, Belleville, and New Glarus High Schools.

- Boys Basketball

-Regional Championships 1950 1951 1957 1958 1965 2000, 2002, 2004, 2010
-Conference Championships 1941 1946 1950 1951 1957 1958 1969, 1973, 1974, 1977, 1979, 1999, 2004, 2009, 2010, 2011

- Girls Basketball

-State Championships- 1991
-Regional Championships- 1990, 1993, 2003, 2004, 2005, 2006

- Football

-Conference Championships-1987, 1988, 1990, 1991, 1992, 2001, 2002, 2005

- Boys Cross Country

-State Championships Qualification- 1994, 1995, 2000, 2009
-Sectional Championships- 1994, 1995, 1996
-Regional Championships- 1996
-Conference Championships- 1996, 1998, 2006, 2007, 2009, 2010, 2011, 2019 (joint team with New Glarus)

- Girls Cross Country

-State Championships Qualification- 1991, 2000, 2009
-Sectional Championships- 1994, 1996, 1997, 1998, 2000
-Regional Championships- 2006
-Conference Championships- 1996, 1997, 1998, 2000, 2006, 2007, 2009, 2011

- Girls Track and Field

-Regional Championship- 1977
-Conference Championships- 1978, 1979, 1990

- Softball

-Regional Championship- 2008
-Conference Championships- 2005

- Volleyball

-Regional Championships- 1977, 1989, 1990, 1993, 1995, 1996, 1998
-Conference Championships- 1973, 1976, 1978, 1979, 1980, 1989, 1990, 1994, 1995, 1996, 2011

- Wrestling

-Regional Championships- 2006
-Conference Championships- 2005, 2006
