= Linden High School (Linden, Wisconsin) =

- U.S. National Register of Historic Places
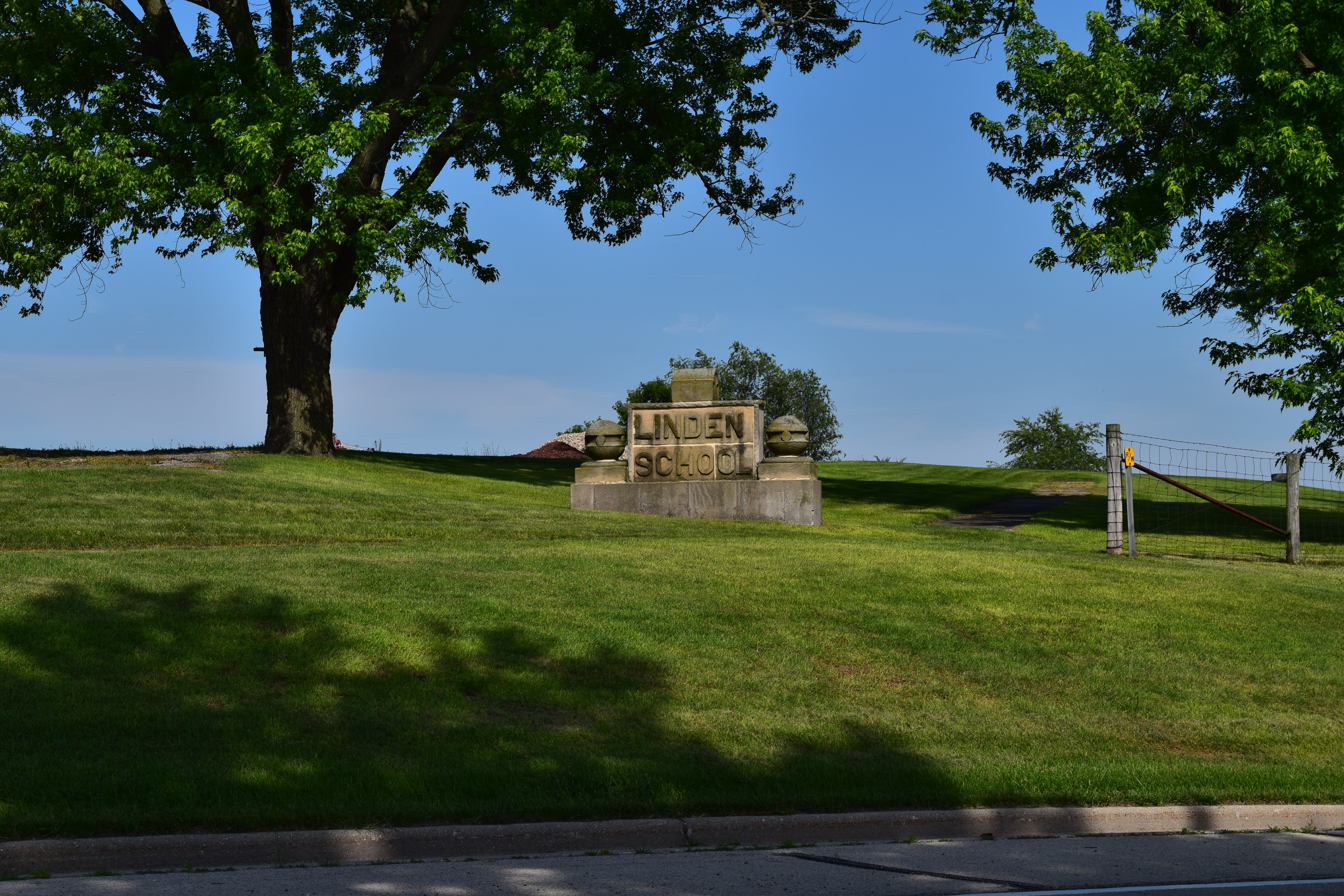
- The school's sign, the only remnant of the school

- Location within Wisconsin
- Location: 344 E. Main St., Linden, Wisconsin
- Coordinates: 42°54′56″N 90°16′07″W
- Area: 3 acres (1.2 ha)
- Built: 1913
- Built by: Thomas Cretney
- Architect: Hans T. Liebert
- NRHP reference No.: 93001168
- Added to NRHP: November 4, 1993

Linden High School was a high school building at 344 East Main Street in Linden, Wisconsin. The school was built in 1913 to replace Linden's 1882 school building, a wooden structure which had burned down earlier that year. Architect Hans T. Liebert gave the two-story brick school a German-inspired design; Liebert's brother Eugene designed the Germania Building in Milwaukee in 1896, and the school's design borrowed elements from the earlier building, notably the columns flanking the entrance. Liebert's design also included a curved parapet above the entrance, limestone ornamentation, and a hip roof with two brick chimneys. Linden used the building continuously until 1960, when Iowa County's rural schools were consolidated and the Linden school closed.

The school was added to the National Register of Historic Places on November 4, 1993. It was demolished in 1995.
