= New Glarus Public School and High School =

- U.S. National Register of Historic Places
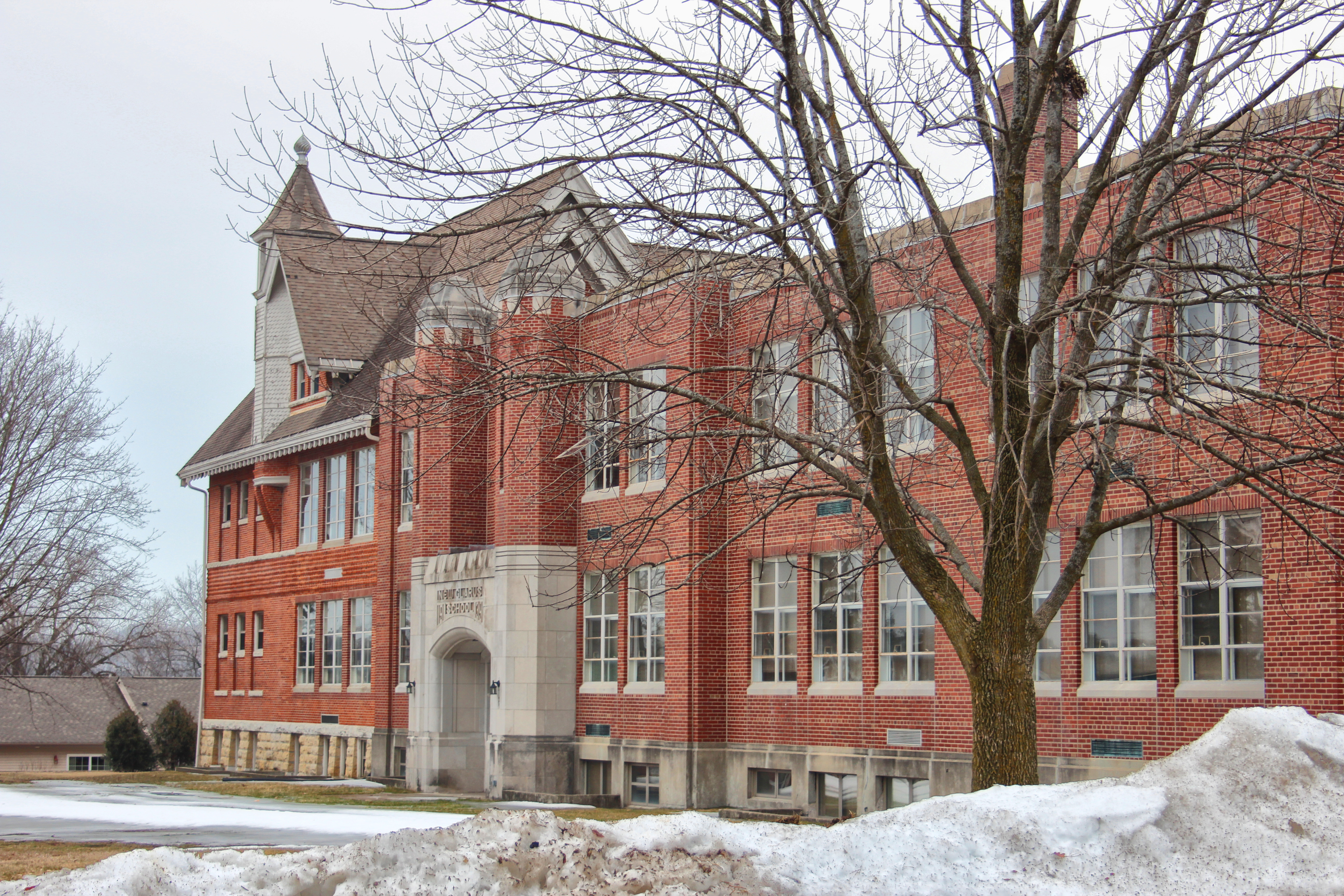
- New Glarus Public School and High School
- Location: 413 Sixth Ave., New Glarus, Wisconsin
- Coordinates: 42°48′51″N 89°38′17″W
- Area: 2 acres (0.81 ha)
- Architect: Allan Conover; Lew F. Porter; Bradley and Bradley
- Architectural style: Richardsonian Romanesque, Art Deco
- NRHP reference No.: 98000284
- Added to NRHP: March 26, 1998

The New Glarus Public School and High School building is located in New Glarus, Wisconsin.

== History ==
The school was first constructed in the 1890s, with several addition made over the decades. Since then, it has been converted into an apartment building. It was added to the State Register of Historic Places in 1997 and to the National Register of Historic Places the following year.

The school was the subject of the 1972 Supreme Court decision Wisconsin v. Yoder, which ruled that Wisconsin's compulsory education law, which forced Amish students to attend the school, was unconstitutional.
