= South Wayne, Wisconsin =

- Village
- Location of South Wayne in Lafayette County, Wisconsin
- Coordinates: 42°34′3″N 89°52′41″W
- Country: United States
- State: Wisconsin
- County: Lafayette

Area
  - Total: 0.83 sq mi (2.16 km^{2})
  - Land: 0.83 sq mi (2.16 km^{2})
  - Water: 0 sq mi (0.00 km^{2})
- Elevation: 827 ft (252 m)

Population (2020)
  - Total: 446
  - Estimate (2023): 446
  - Density: 568.4/sq mi (219.45/km^{2})
- Time zone: UTC-6 (Central (CST))
  - Summer (DST): UTC-5 (CDT)
- Area code: 608
- FIPS code: 55-75275
- GNIS feature ID: 1574504
- Website: villageofsouthwayne.com

South Wayne is a village in Lafayette County, Wisconsin, United States. The population was 446 at the 2020 census.

== Geography ==
South Wayne is located at 42°34′3″N 89°52′41″W (42.567584, -89.878131).

According to the United States Census Bureau, the village has a total area of 0.79 square miles (2.05 km^{2}), all land.

== Demographics ==
Historical population
Census	Pop.	Note	%±
1890	285		—
1920	290		—
1930	316		9.0%
1940	331		4.7%
1950	328		−0.9%
1960	354		7.9%
1970	436		23.2%
1980	495		13.5%
1990	478		−3.4%
2000	484		1.3%
2010	489		1.0%
2020	444		−9.2%
U.S. Decennial Census

=== 2010 census ===
As of the census of 2010, there were 489 people, 206 households, and 121 families living in the village. The population density was 619.0 inhabitants per square mile (239.0/km^{2}). There were 220 housing units at an average density of 278.5 per square mile (107.5/km^{2}). The racial makeup of the village was 99.2% White, 0.6% African American, and 0.2% from other races. Hispanic or Latino people of any race were 0.4% of the population.

There were 206 households, of which 31.6% had children under the age of 18 living with them, 45.1% were married couples living together, 6.8% had a female householder with no husband present, 6.8% had a male householder with no wife present, and 41.3% were non-families. 35.9% of all households were made up of individuals, and 17.5% had someone living alone who was 65 years of age or older. The average household size was 2.37 and the average family size was 3.07.

The median age in the village was 40.1 years. 26.8% of residents were under the age of 18; 6% were between the ages of 18 and 24; 22.8% were from 25 to 44; 28.4% were from 45 to 64; and 16% were 65 years of age or older. The gender makeup of the village was 52.8% male and 47.2% female.

=== 2000 census ===
As of the census of 2000, there were 484 people, 203 households, and 126 families living in the village. The population density was 612.5 people per square mile (236.5/km^{2}). There were 218 housing units at an average density of 275.9 per square mile (106.5/km^{2}). The racial makeup of the village was 99.59% White, and 0.41% from two or more races.

There were 203 households, out of which 30.0% had children under the age of 18 living with them, 49.8% were married couples living together, 7.4% had a female householder with no husband present, and 37.9% were non-families. 33.0% of all households were made up of individuals, and 20.2% had someone living alone who was 65 years of age or older. The average household size was 2.38 and the average family size was 3.03.

In the village, the population was spread out, with 26.9% under the age of 18, 6.8% from 18 to 24, 30.0% from 25 to 44, 16.9% from 45 to 64, and 19.4% who were 65 years of age or older. The median age was 39 years. For every 100 females, there were 96.0 males. For every 100 females age 18 and over, there were 93.4 males.

The median income for a household in the village was $30,909, and the median income for a family was $41,944. Males had a median income of $24,750 versus $22,188 for females. The per capita income for the village was $15,631. About 7.9% of families and 9.0% of the population were below the poverty line, including 5.6% of those under age 18 and 15.0% of those age 65 or over.

== Recreation ==
The Cheese Country Trail passes through the village.

== Notable people ==
- Justus Henry Nelson, Methodist missionary in the Amazon, grew up in South Wayne
- Melvin Olson, Wisconsin State Senator, was President of South Wayne
- Bailey Butler, Green Bay Phoenix women’s basketball player, was born and raised in South Wayne
