= Patch Grove, Wisconsin =

- Village
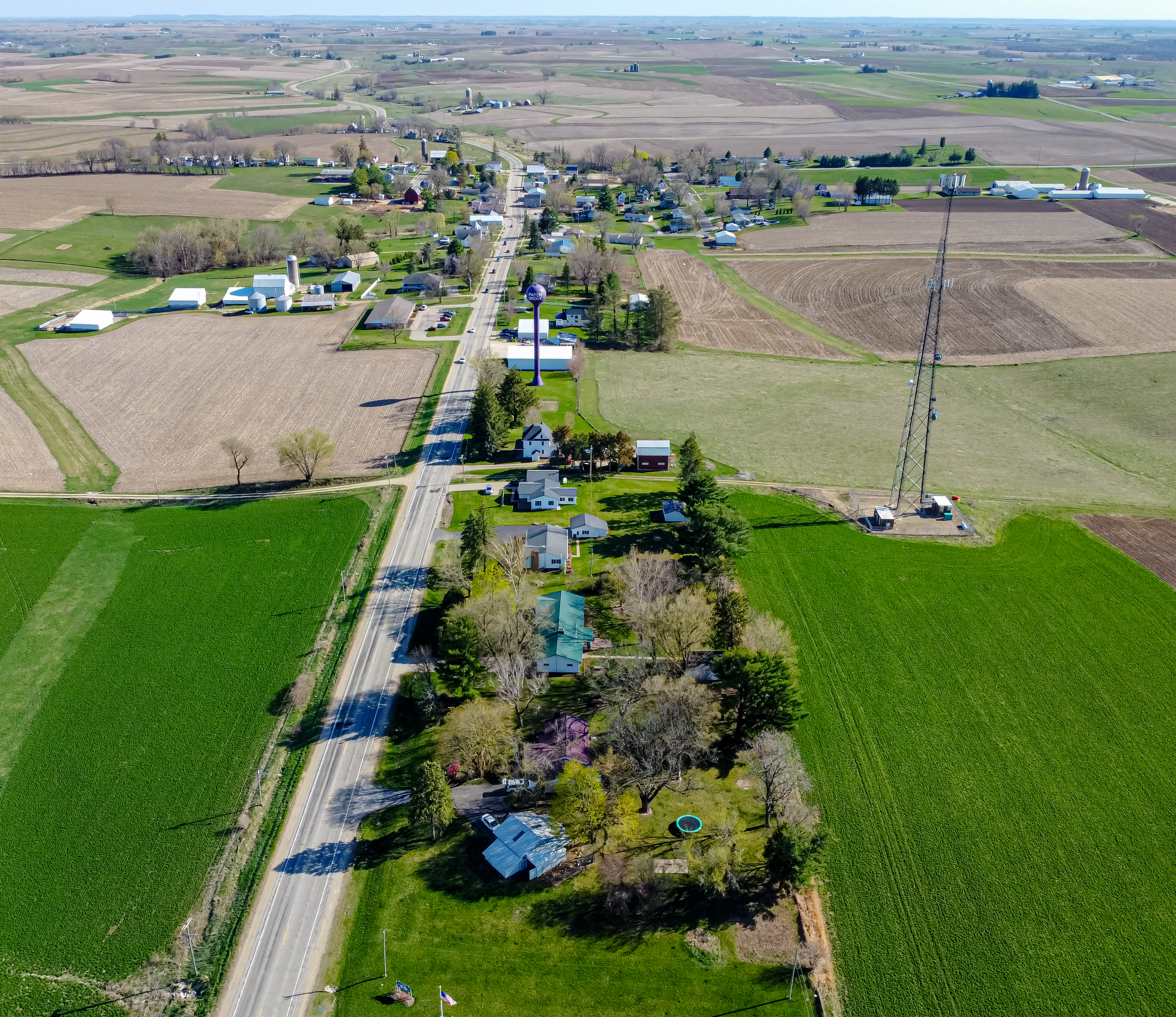
- Wis-35 runs through town

- Location of Patch Grove in Grant County, Wisconsin.
- Coordinates: 42°56′22.07″N 90°58′20.25″W
- Country: United States
- State: Wisconsin
- County: Grant

Area
  - Total: 0.38 sq mi (0.98 km^{2})
  - Land: 0.38 sq mi (0.98 km^{2})
  - Water: 0 sq mi (0.00 km^{2})
- Elevation: 1,112 ft (339 m)

Population (2020)
  - Total: 201
  - Density: 530/sq mi (210/km^{2})
- Time zone: UTC-6 (Central (CST))
  - Summer (DST): UTC-5 (CDT)
- Area code: 608
- FIPS code: 55-61450
- GNIS feature ID: 1583899

Patch Grove is a village in Grant County, Wisconsin, United States. The population was 201 at the 2020 census. The village is located within the Town of Patch Grove.

== Geography ==
Patch Grove is located at 42°56′22.07″N 90°58′20.25″W.

According to the United States Census Bureau, the village has a total area of 0.39 square miles (1.01 km^{2}), all land.

== Demographics ==
Historical population
Census	Pop.	Note	%±
1870	177		—
1930	243		—
1940	195		−19.8%
1950	203		4.1%
1960	208		2.5%
1970	187		−10.1%
1980	259		38.5%
1990	202		−22.0%
2000	166		−17.8%
2010	198		19.3%
2020	201		1.5%
U.S. Decennial Census

=== 2010 census ===
As of the census of 2010, there were 198 people, 82 households, and 55 families living in the village. The population density was 507.7 inhabitants per square mile (196.0/km^{2}). There were 88 housing units at an average density of 225.6 per square mile (87.1/km^{2}). The racial makeup of the village was 98.5% White and 1.5% from other races. Hispanic or Latino of any race were 4.0% of the population.

There were 82 households, of which 29.3% had children under the age of 18 living with them, 57.3% were married couples living together, 6.1% had a female householder with no husband present, 3.7% had a male householder with no wife present, and 32.9% were non-families. 26.8% of all households were made up of individuals, and 8.5% had someone living alone who was 65 years of age or older. The average household size was 2.41 and the average family size was 2.89.

The median age in the village was 37.5 years. 25.3% of residents were under the age of 18; 7.6% were between the ages of 18 and 24; 24.3% were from 25 to 44; 25.9% were from 45 to 64; and 17.2% were 65 years of age or older. The gender makeup of the village was 53.5% male and 46.5% female.

=== 2000 census ===
As of the census of 2000, there were 166 people, 65 households, and 46 families living in the village. The population density was 423.7 people per square mile (164.3/km^{2}). There were 67 housing units at an average density of 171.0 per square mile (66.3/km^{2}). The racial makeup of the village was 100.00% White. 1.81% of the population were Hispanic or Latino of any race.

There were 65 households, out of which 32.3% had children under the age of 18 living with them, 66.2% were married couples living together, 3.1% had a female householder with no husband present, and 29.2% were non-families. 21.5% of all households were made up of individuals, and 15.4% had someone living alone who was 65 years of age or older. The average household size was 2.55 and the average family size was 3.04.

In the village, the population was spread out, with 27.1% under the age of 18, 7.8% from 18 to 24, 27.1% from 25 to 44, 22.9% from 45 to 64, and 15.1% who were 65 years of age or older. The median age was 34 years. For every 100 females, there were 104.9 males. For every 100 females age 18 and over, there were 116.1 males.

The median income for a household in the village was $25,625, and the median income for a family was $38,125. Males had a median income of $18,750 versus $21,250 for females. The per capita income for the village was $13,189. About 12.1% of families and 13.0% of the population were below the poverty line, including 24.3% of those under the age of eighteen and 16.7% of those 65 or over.

== Education ==
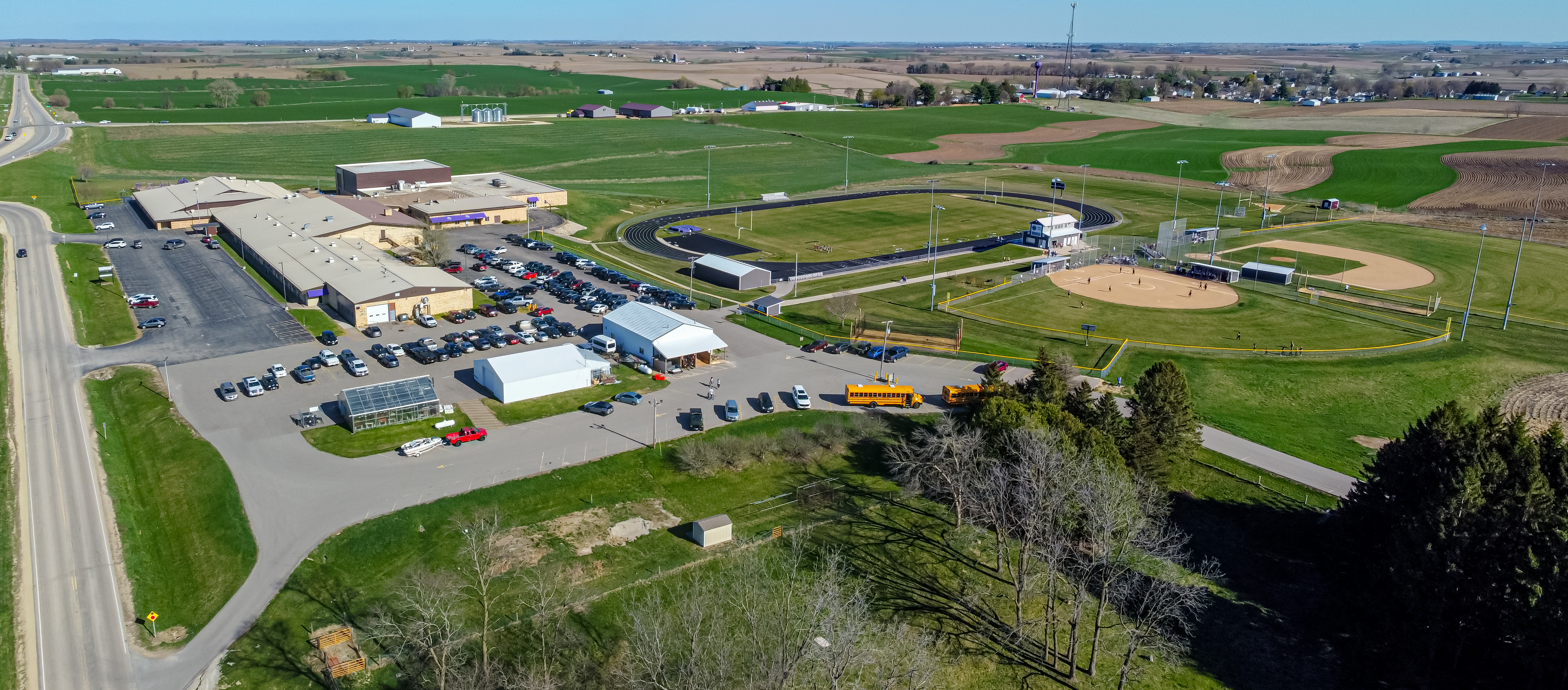
River Ridge High/Middle School in Patch Grove, Wisconsin

The River Ridge High-Middle School is located in Patch Grove on US-18 / Wis-133.

== Notable people ==
- Jennie O'Neill Potter (1867–1900), actor and dramatic reader
