= Blanchardville, Wisconsin =

- Village
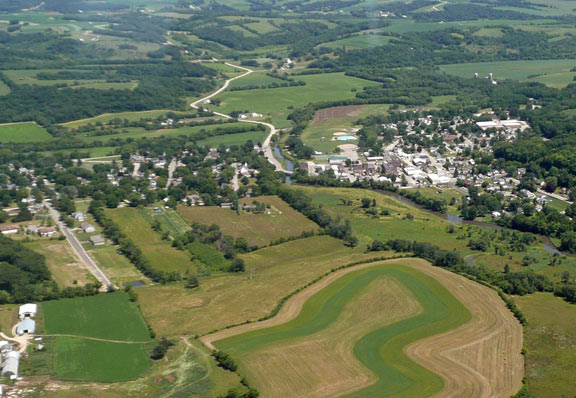
- Aerial view of Blanchardville

- Location of Blanchardville in Lafayette and Iowa counties, Wisconsin
- Coordinates: 42°48′37″N 89°51′42″W
- Country: United States
- State: Wisconsin
- Counties: Lafayette, Iowa

Area
  - Total: 0.48 sq mi (1.25 km^{2})
  - Land: 0.48 sq mi (1.25 km^{2})
  - Water: 0 sq mi (0.00 km^{2})
- Elevation: 823 ft (251 m)

Population (2020)
  - Total: 807
  - Density: 1,670/sq mi (646/km^{2})
- Time zone: UTC-6 (Central (CST))
  - Summer (DST): UTC-5 (CDT)
- Area code: 353/608
- FIPS code: 55-08125
- GNIS feature ID: 1561917
- Website: blanchardville.com

Blanchardville is a village in Lafayette and Iowa counties in the U.S. state of Wisconsin. The population was 807 at the 2020 census, of which 613 were in Lafayette County and 194 were in Iowa County. It is 30 miles (48 km) southwest of the state capital, Madison.

== History ==
The community was originally settled by members of the Church of Jesus Christ of Latter Day Saints (Strangite) in the early 1840s, who named it Zarahemla. The Mormon settlers mined lead ore and farmed. Blanchardville's first mill was built in 1840.

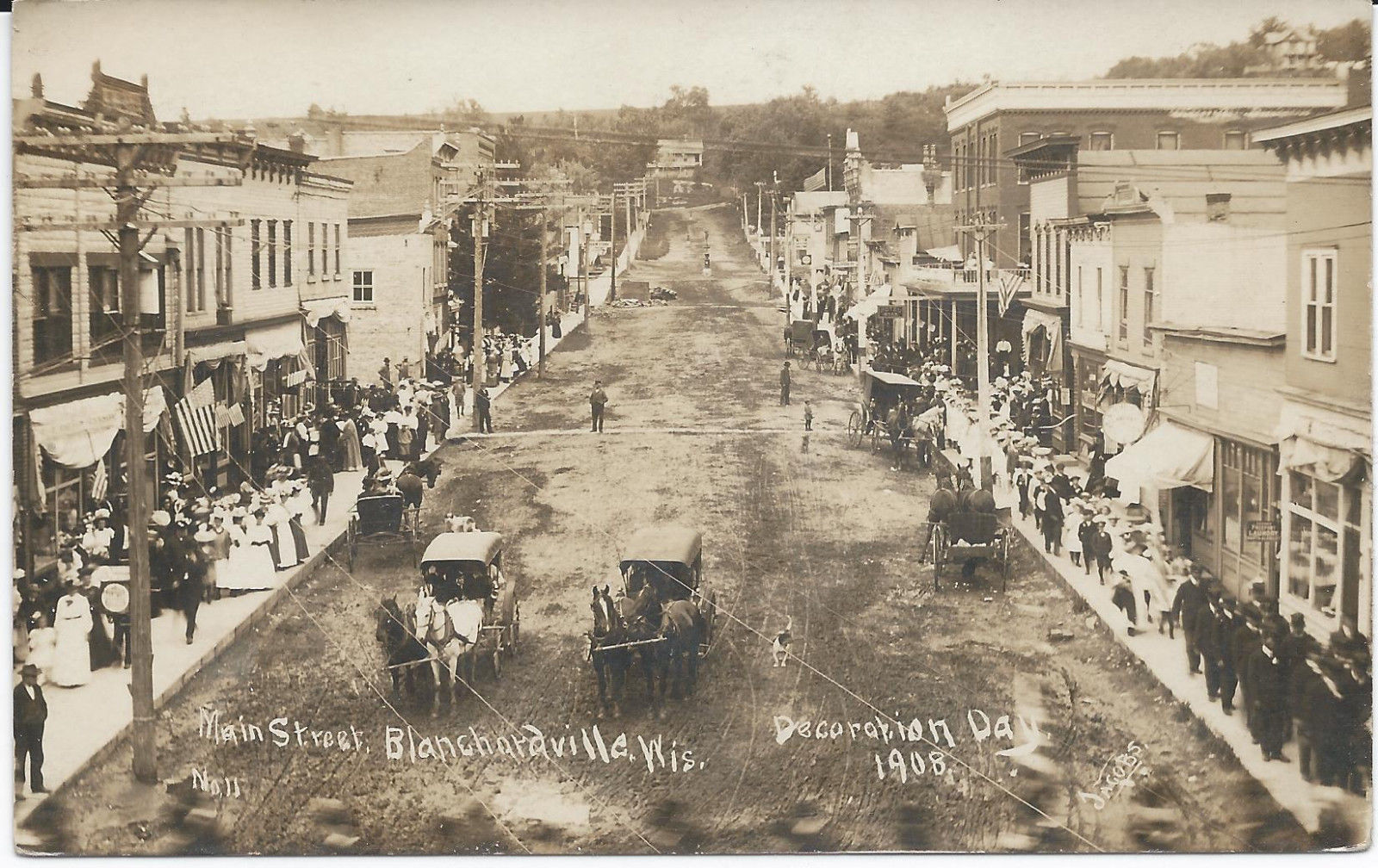
Main Street of Blanchardville on Decoration Day, 1908

In 1856, Alvin Blanchard moved to the area from his farm near Dodgeville. He purchased the mill on the Pecatonica river from the Mormons, who mostly left the area. Along with Cyrus Newkirk, he platted the village which currently bears his name in 1857. The village received its first post office the next year. The Yankee settlers established a Methodist church in 1852. A Norwegian Lutheran congregation shared the church from 1864 until 1892 when their own separate church was built. The village's most prominent ethnic group is the Norwegians, as the village is between the large historic Blue Mounds and Wiota Norwegian settlements. Yankee, Irish, Swiss, and German settlers were in the village also and in 1898 the first Catholic church was built. Nearby rural churches in the area included Norwegian Lutheran congregations in York, Yellowstone, and Adams townships, and an Irish Catholic congregation in Yellowstone as well.

== Geography ==
Blanchardville is located on the East Branch Pecatonica River. The community is served by Wisconsin Highway 78 and routes F and H.

According to the United States Census Bureau, the village has a total area of 0.50 square miles (1.29 km^{2}), all land.

== Demographics ==
Historical population
Census	Pop.	Note	%±
1880	169		—
1900	573		—
1910	643		12.2%
1920	653		1.6%
1930	651		−0.3%
1940	662		1.7%
1950	707		6.8%
1960	632		−10.6%
1970	794		25.6%
1980	803		1.1%
1990	802		−0.1%
2000	806		0.5%
2010	825		2.4%
2020	807		−2.2%
U.S. Decennial Census

=== 2010 census ===
As of the census of 2010, there were 825 people, 360 households, and 228 families living in the village. The population density was 1,650.0 inhabitants per square mile (637.1/km^{2}). There were 396 housing units at an average density of 792.0 per square mile (305.8/km^{2}). The racial makeup of the village was 98.9% White, 0.1% African American, 0.2% Asian, 0.2% from other races, and 0.5% from two or more races. Hispanic or Latino of any race were 1.2% of the population.

There were 360 households, of which 31.4% had children under the age of 18 living with them, 47.2% were married couples living together, 10.0% had a female householder with no husband present, 6.1% had a male householder with no wife present, and 36.7% were non-families. 31.7% of all households were made up of individuals, and 13.3% had someone living alone who was 65 years of age or older. The average household size was 2.29 and the average family size was 2.86.

The median age in the village was 40.8 years. 24.7% of residents were under the age of 18; 6.9% were between the ages of 18 and 24; 24.7% were from 25 to 44; 28.8% were from 45 to 64; and 14.9% were 65 years of age or older. The gender makeup of the village was 50.4% male and 49.6% female.

=== 2000 census ===
As of the census of 2000, there were 806 people, 346 households, and 206 families living in the village. The population density was 1,837.4 people per square mile (707.3/km^{2}). There were 376 housing units at an average density of 857.1 per square mile (329.9/km^{2}). The racial makeup of the village was 99.38% White, 0.25% Asian, and 0.37% from two or more races. Hispanic or Latino of any race were 0.37% of the population.

There were 346 households, out of which 28.6% had children under the age of 18 living with them, 50.9% were married couples living together, 7.2% had a female householder with no husband present, and 40.2% were non-families. 35.8% of all households were made up of individuals, and 17.1% had someone living alone who was 65 years of age or older. The average household size was 2.33 and the average family size was 3.05.

In the village, the population was spread out, with 24.9% under the age of 18, 6.7% from 18 to 24, 29.8% from 25 to 44, 20.7% from 45 to 64, and 17.9% who were 65 years of age or older. The median age was 38 years. For every 100 females, there were 98.5 males. For every 100 females age 18 and over, there were 96.4 males.

The median income for a household in the village was $40,313, and the median income for a family was $51,776. Males had a median income of $31,908 versus $26,208 for females. The per capita income for the village was $18,104. About 6.7% of families and 9.8% of the population were below the poverty line, including 9.6% of those under age 18 and 8.3% of those age 65 or over.

== Education ==
Blanchardville is served by the Pecatonica Area Schools, which includes Pecatonica High School, Pecatonica Middle School and Pecatonica Elementary School.

== Sports and recreation ==
- The Yellowstone Lake State Park is near Blanchardville.

== Notable people ==
- M. J. Cleary, State Representative and insurance executive
- Oscar R. Olson, state senator
