= Pecatonica High School (Wisconsin) =

Location
- 704 Cross Street; Blanchardville, (Lafayette County), Wisconsin 53516
- Coordinates: 42.807374°N 89.85995°W

Information
- School type: Public High School
- School district: Pecatonica Area School District
- Principal: Mark Stateler
- Staff: 22.00 (FTE)
- Grades: 6 to 12
- Enrollment: 207 (2022-2023)
- Student to teacher ratio: 9.41
- Classrooms: 23
- Colors: Kelly green and gold
- Song: Across The Field
- Mascot: Viking
- Team name: Vikings
- Budget: $1.4M
- Feeder schools: Pecatonica Elementary School
- Telephone: (608) 523-4285
- Facsimile: (608) 523-4286
- State Agency ID: 0490
- State School ID: 0040
- FIPS County Number: 55065
- NCES Assigned School ID: 550131000182
- Website: https://www.pecatonica.k12.wi.us/

Pecatonica High School is a public school in Blanchardville, Wisconsin serving students in grades 6 through 12. Its enrollment is about 230.

== Environmental initiatives ==
In 2006, Pecatonica took part in the Wisconsin Governor’s High School Conference on the Environment to learn about the state's climate record, global climate change, and related global environmental issues. In 2011 the high school began a recycling program headed by a graduate of the class of 2011.

In 2001, Pecatonica participated in a United States Environmental Protection Agency program that provided specialized training, equipment, and training materials for teachers on ground water contamination and testing.

== Recognition ==
In 2017, Pecatonica High School was a Silver Award Recipient for Best High Schools in Wisconsin. In 2018, the high school received a Bronze Award. In 2017, Pecatonica High School was recognized as a "College Board Advanced Placement Pacesetting" School for the number of students who took AP Exams and received scores of three or higher. In 2016 and 2005, Pecatonica received a Standing Up for Rural Schools, Communities, and Libraries award from the Wisconsin Superintendent of Schools. The award provides recognition of rural communities that advocate for schools, libraries, and lifestyle at a time when the communities are financially challenged.

== Athletics ==
The Pecatonica's girls' basketball team won the Wisconsin Interscholastic Athletic Association Division 4 state championship in 1993 and 1994. In 2001, both the boys' and girls' basketball teams were runners-up at their respective state tournaments. The school mascot is the Viking. The Pecatonica/Argyle co-op football team was runner-up at the 2004 state tournament. In 2019, the men’s track and field qualified for State in the 4x800 meter relay. The team took fourth in the relay and broke the school record by over ten seconds. The baseball team also had a very successful season but faltered at the end of the 2019 season in the similar but disappointing manner in which they ended their previous few seasons. the 2023 baseball season ended in a successful but disappointing manner. The boys got all the way to the state championship where they failed to pull off the 6 run lead.

=== Athletic conference affiliation history ===
- State Line League (1971-1997)
- Six Rivers Conference (1997–present)
