= Kies =

Kies may refer to:

== Software ==
- Samsung Kies, a software application to connect a Samsung smartphone with a computer

== Places ==
- Cēsis, a town in Latvia (Polish: Kieś)
- Kies (crater), a crater on the Moon named for Johann Kies
- Kies, Switzerland, a place near Schwanden in the Swiss canton of Glarus

== People with the surname ==
- Constance Kies (1934–1993), American dietitian and nutritionist
- Cosette Kies (born 1936), American writer, librarian, and academic
- Johann Kies (1713–1781), German astronomer
- Mary Dixon Kies (1752–1837), American inventor
- Pauline Kies (1918–1999), South African botanist
