= Kiesel =

Kiesel may refer to:

- Kiesel (surname)
- Kiesel Guitars, a guitar manufacturer
- The chemical element Silicon
- The chemical compound Silicon dioxide
- The mineral from silicon dioxide Quartz
- Unspecific chemical compounds of Silicic acid
- a widely distributed sediment, small stones (Kieselsteine), see Kies (disambiguation)
