= Riverdale School District (Wisconsin) =

School district in Wisconsin, United States

Address
- 747 North 6th Street Muscoda, Wisconsin, 53573; United States

District information
- Type: Public
- Grades: PK–12
- Schools: 4
- NCES District ID: 5510140

Students and staff
- Students: 631 (2025–2026)
- Teachers: 48.11 (on an FTE basis) (2025–2026)
- Staff: 48.66 (on an FTE basis) (2025–2026)
- Student–teacher ratio: 13.12 (2025–2026)

Other information
- Website: www.riverdale.k12.wi.us

Riverdale School District is the school district in the U.S. state of Wisconsin serving the villages of Muscoda, Blue River, and Avoca, as well as surrounding areas of Crawford, Grant, Iowa, and Richland Counties.

Riverdale Junior and Senior High School, is the district's junior high school and high school, and Riverdale Elementary School is the district's elementary school.

== Boundary ==
Within Grant County it includes Blue River and the county's portion of the Village of Muscoda. The district includes all of the Town of Muscoda, a majority of the Town of Watterstown, and a portion of the Town of Castle Rock.

Within Iowa County it includes Avoca and the county's portion of the Village of Muscoda. The district includes most of the Town of Pulaski and portions of the towns of Clyde and Highland.

Within Richland County it includes majorities of the towns of Eagle and Richwood, and sections of the towns of Orion and Akan.

Within Crawford County it includes a small portion of the Town of Scott.
