= Blue River, Wisconsin =

- Village
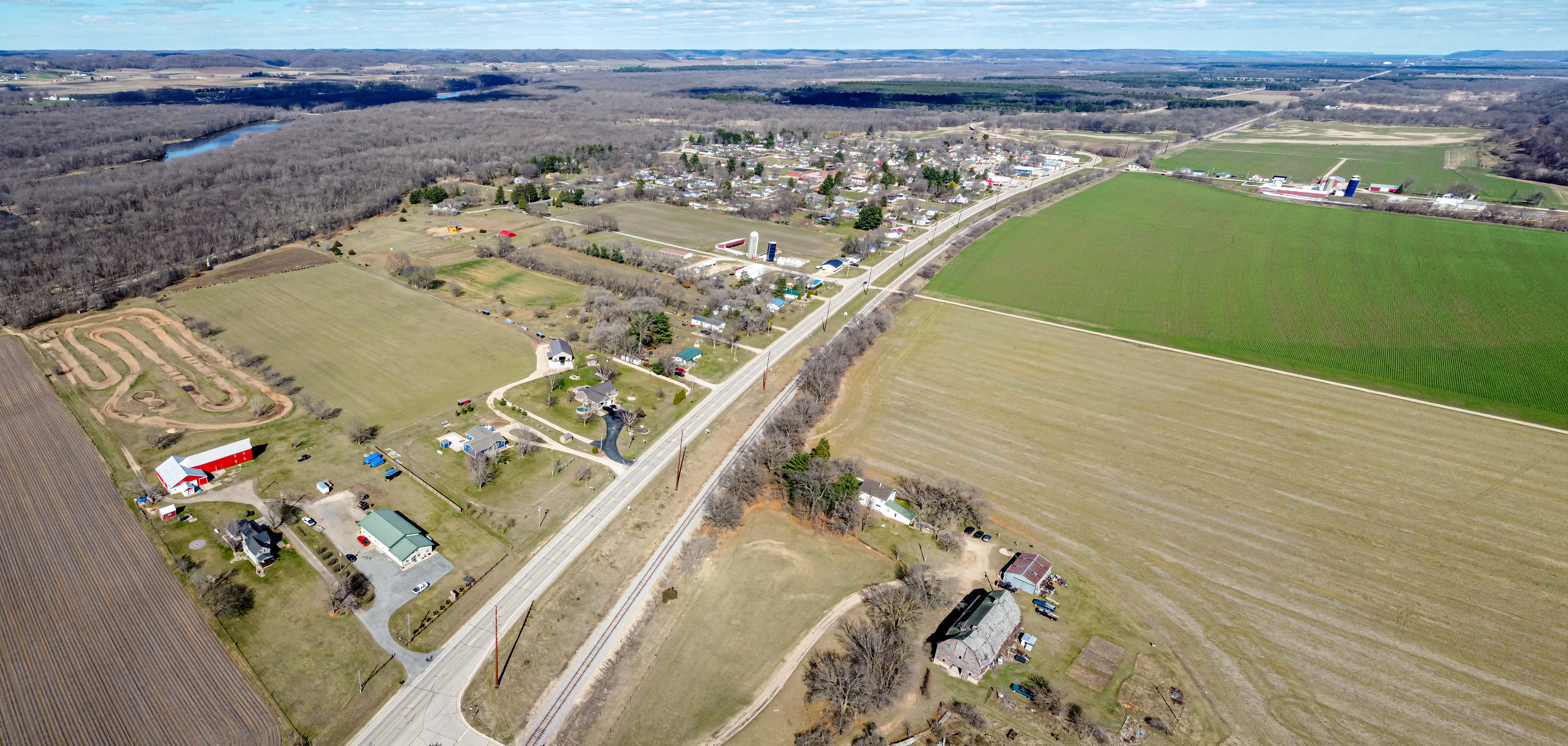
- Wis-133 runs through town

- Location of Blue River in Grant County, Wisconsin.
- Coordinates: 43°11′13″N 90°34′12″W
- Country: United States
- State: Wisconsin
- County: Grant

Area
  - Total: 0.91 sq mi (2.36 km^{2})
  - Land: 0.91 sq mi (2.36 km^{2})
  - Water: 0 sq mi (0.00 km^{2})
- Elevation: 663 ft (202 m)

Population (2020)
  - Total: 457
  - Density: 502/sq mi (194/km^{2})
- Time zone: UTC-6 (Central (CST))
  - Summer (DST): UTC-5 (CDT)
- Area code: 608
- FIPS code: 55-08525
- GNIS feature ID: 1561952

Blue River is a village in Grant County, Wisconsin, United States. The population was 457 at the 2020 census.

== Places ==
Eagle Cave is near Blue River.

== Geography ==
Blue River is located at 43°11′13″N 90°34′12″W (43.186952, -90.570131).

According to the United States Census Bureau, the village has a total area of 0.80 square miles (2.07 km^{2}), all land.

== Demographics ==
Historical population
Census	Pop.	Note	%±
1920	396		—
1930	346		−12.6%
1940	381		10.1%
1950	425		11.5%
1960	356		−16.2%
1970	369		3.7%
1980	412		11.7%
1990	438		6.3%
2000	429		−2.1%
2010	434		1.2%
2020	457		5.3%
U.S. Decennial Census

=== 2010 census ===
As of the census of 2010, there were 434 people, 192 households, and 113 families living in the village. The population density was 542.5 inhabitants per square mile (209.5/km^{2}). There were 217 housing units at an average density of 271.3 per square mile (104.7/km^{2}). The racial makeup of the village was 96.5% White, 0.7% African American, 0.5% Native American, 0.7% Asian, 0.7% from other races, and 0.9% from two or more races. Hispanic or Latino of any race were 1.8% of the population.

There were 192 households, of which 30.7% had children under the age of 18 living with them, 44.3% were married couples living together, 6.8% had a female householder with no husband present, 7.8% had a male householder with no wife present, and 41.1% were non-families. 32.8% of all households were made up of individuals, and 14.6% had someone living alone who was 65 years of age or older. The average household size was 2.26 and the average family size was 2.88.

The median age in the village was 42.1 years. 23.7% of residents were under the age of 18; 6.9% were between the ages of 18 and 24; 23.7% were from 25 to 44; 29.6% were from 45 to 64; and 16.1% were 65 years of age or older. The gender makeup of the village was 51.4% male and 48.6% female.

=== 2000 census ===
As of the census of 2000, there were 429 people, 183 households, and 116 families living in the village. The population density was 577.8 people per square mile (223.8/km^{2}). There were 205 housing units at an average density of 276.1 per square mile (107.0/km^{2}). The racial makeup of the village was 99.77% White and 0.23% Asian. Hispanic or Latino of any race were 0.23% of the population.

There were 183 households, out of which 30.1% had children under the age of 18 living with them, 49.7% were married couples living together, 9.3% had a female householder with no husband present, and 36.1% were non-families. 33.3% of all households were made up of individuals, and 18.0% had someone living alone who was 65 years of age or older. The average household size was 2.34 and the average family size was 2.97.

In the village, the population was spread out, with 24.9% under the age of 18, 9.6% from 18 to 24, 26.3% from 25 to 44, 23.1% from 45 to 64, and 16.1% who were 65 years of age or older. The median age was 38 years. For every 100 females, there were 107.2 males. For every 100 females age 18 and over, there were 100.0 males.

The median income for a household in the village was $34,250, and the median income for a family was $41,806. Males had a median income of $30,515 versus $20,625 for females. The per capita income for the village was $16,548. About 3.5% of families and 8.6% of the population were below the poverty line, including 7.5% of those under age 18 and 15.1% of those age 65 or over.

== Education ==
Blue River is in the Riverdale School District, which operates Riverdale Junior and Senior High School.

== Gallery ==
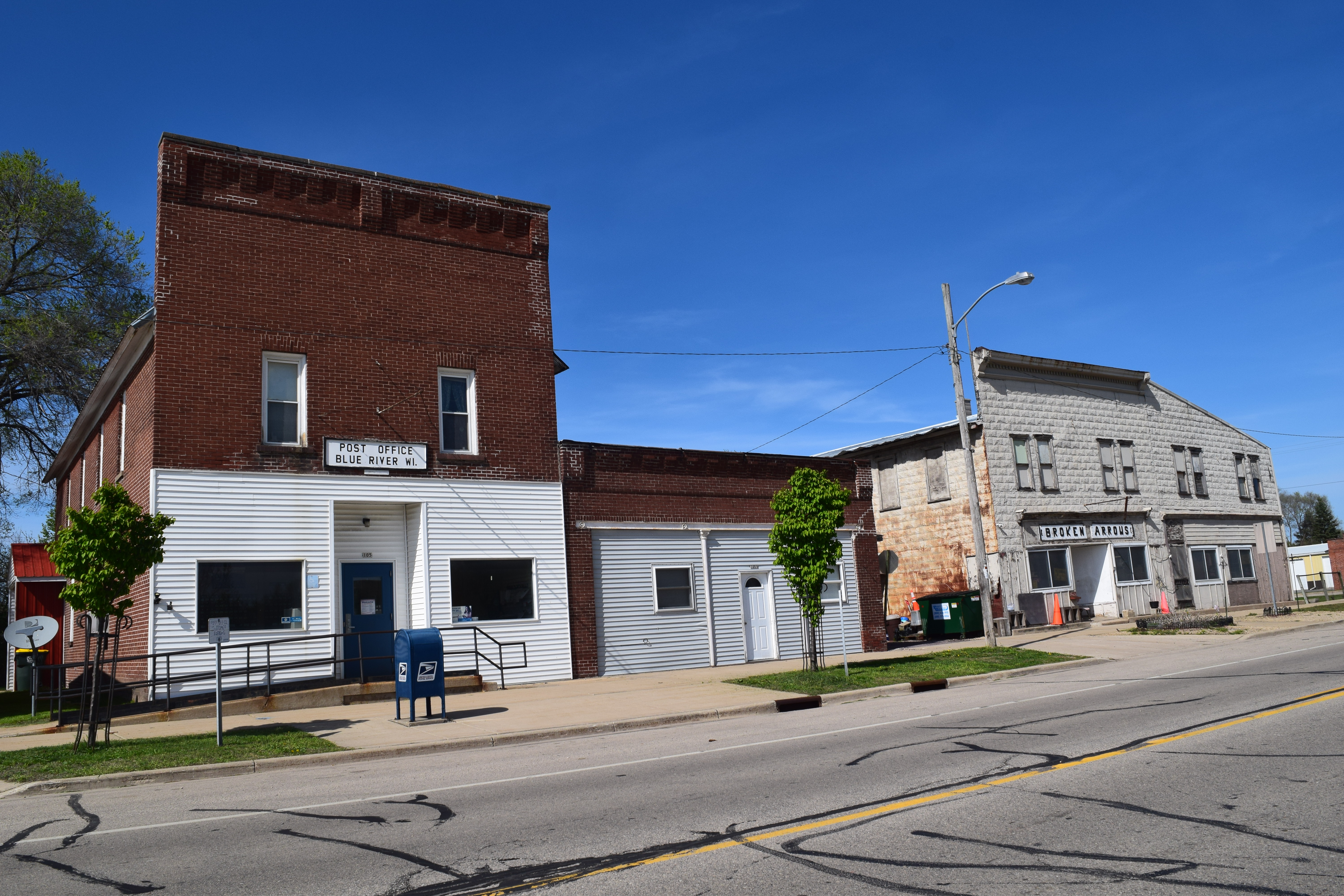
Blue River, Wisconsin Post office

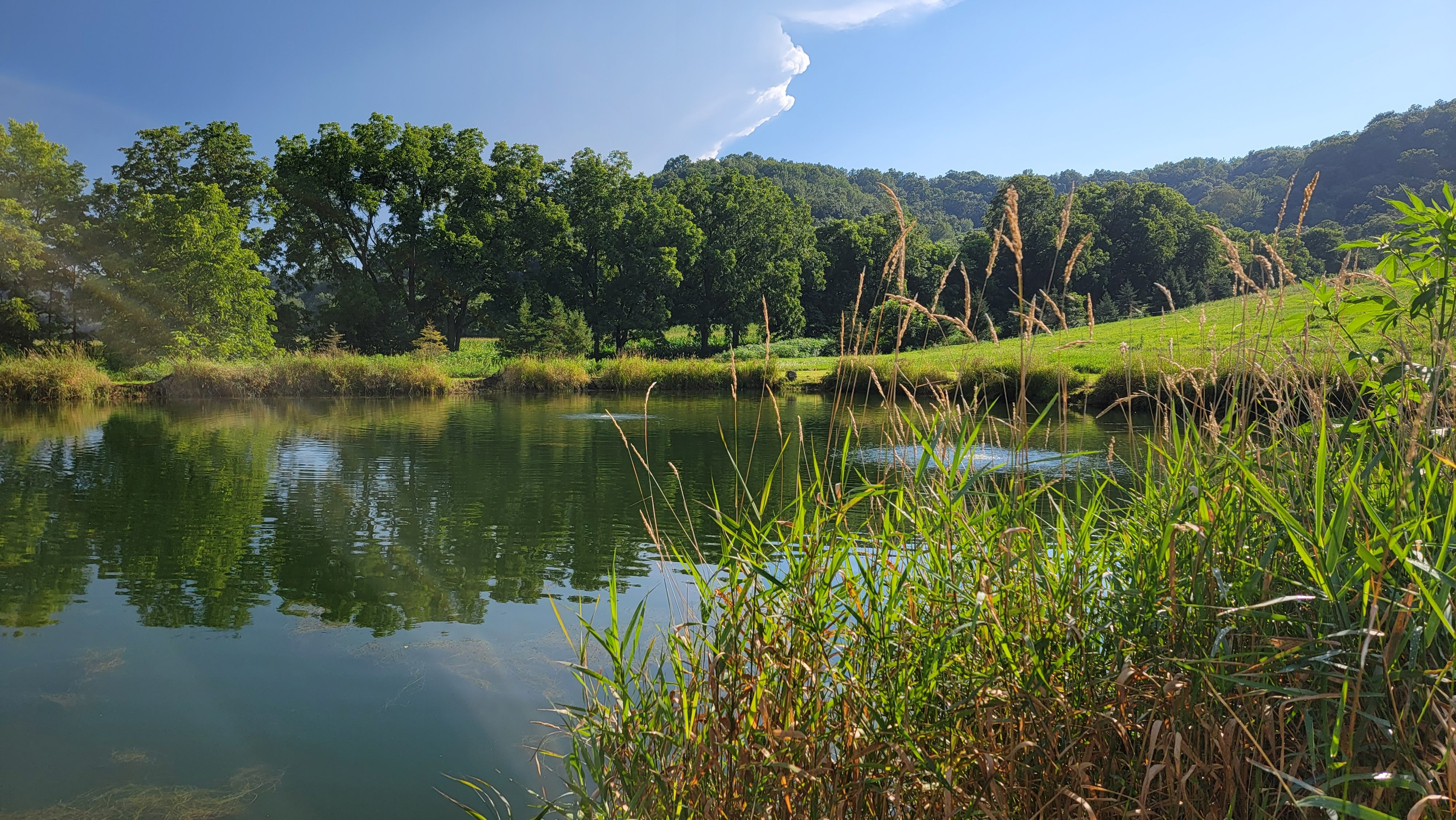

== Notable people ==
- Doug Adams, baseball player for part of one season with Chicago White Sox
- Constance Kies, nutrition scientist and dietitian
