= Phyllis Dixon Clemmons =

American nurse

- Born: Phyllis Dixon; August 13, 1927; Apollo, Pennsylvania, U.S.
- Died: June 9, 2013 (aged 85)
- Occupation(s): Nurse, missionary, federal official
- Known for: Federal Woman's Award (1972)

Phyllis K. Dixon Clemmons (August 13, 1927 – June 9, 2013) was an American psychiatric nurse, missionary, and federal official. She won the Federal Woman's Award in 1972, for her work on suicide prevention and mental health programs in the District of Columbia.

== Early life ==
Phyllis Dixon was born in Apollo, Pennsylvania, the daughter of Frederick Dixon and Cornelia Cochran Dixon. She graduated from Apollo High School in 1945, and earned a nursing degree in 1948, at Mercy Hospital in Philadelphia.

== Career ==
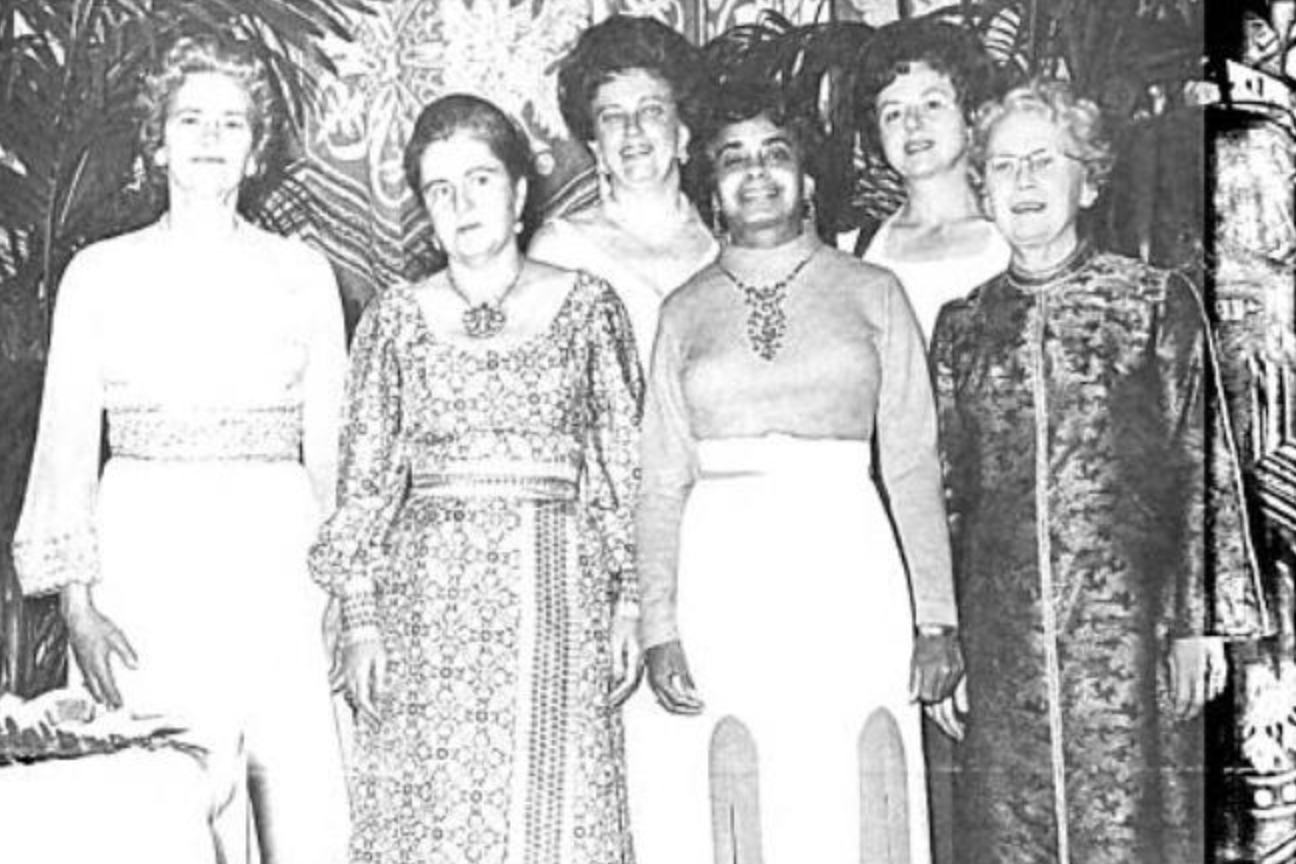
Federal Woman's Award winners in 1972: Mary H. Ferguson, Patricia Ann McCreedy, Ruth M. Davis, Phyllis Dixon Clemmons, Lois Albro Chatham, and Ruth M. Leverton

Clemmons was a registered nurse. She was a member of the United States Cadet Nurse Corps immediately after World War II. She began working at St. Elizabeths Hospital in 1949. In 1962 she was a psychiatric nurse at D.C. General Hospital. She was director of the Suicide Prevention and Emergency Mental Health Consultation Service in the District of Columbia. She started a walk-in clinic, a mobile clinic, and a telephone helpline, and her efforts were credited with contributing to lowering the suicide rate in the city.

Clemmons's work was recognized by the American Psychiatric Association, and she won the Federal Woman's Award in 1972, "for singular professional competence and qualities of human understanding".

Clemmons traveled to 31 countries as a medical missionary with Doris Loughlin. Later in life, she worked in addiction counseling in Johnstown, Pennsylvania.

== Personal life ==
Phyllis Dixon married Alvin Earl Clemmons in 1956. They had two children. Clemmons died in 2013, aged 85 years.
