= Eagle Cave =

Cave in Wisconsin, United States

- Location within Wisconsin
- Location: Richland County, Wisconsin, US
- Coordinates: 43°14′35″N 90°32′30″W
- Discovery: 1849
- Geology: Onyx
- Access: Public

Eagle Cave is an onyx cave located near Blue River, Wisconsin, in Richland County. Eagle Cave is known as Wisconsin's largest onyx cave and was the first cave to be commercially owned and operated in Wisconsin. The cave was discovered in 1849 and opened to the public in 1938. It is a popular camping destination, especially during the fall, winter, and spring months, when youth group campers are allowed to camp inside the cave and participate in their cave exploratory program. The cave exploratory program has been operating since 1954.
