= Riverdale Junior and Senior High School =

Coordinates: 43°11′34.0″N 90°26′25.4″W

Riverdale Junior-Senior High School
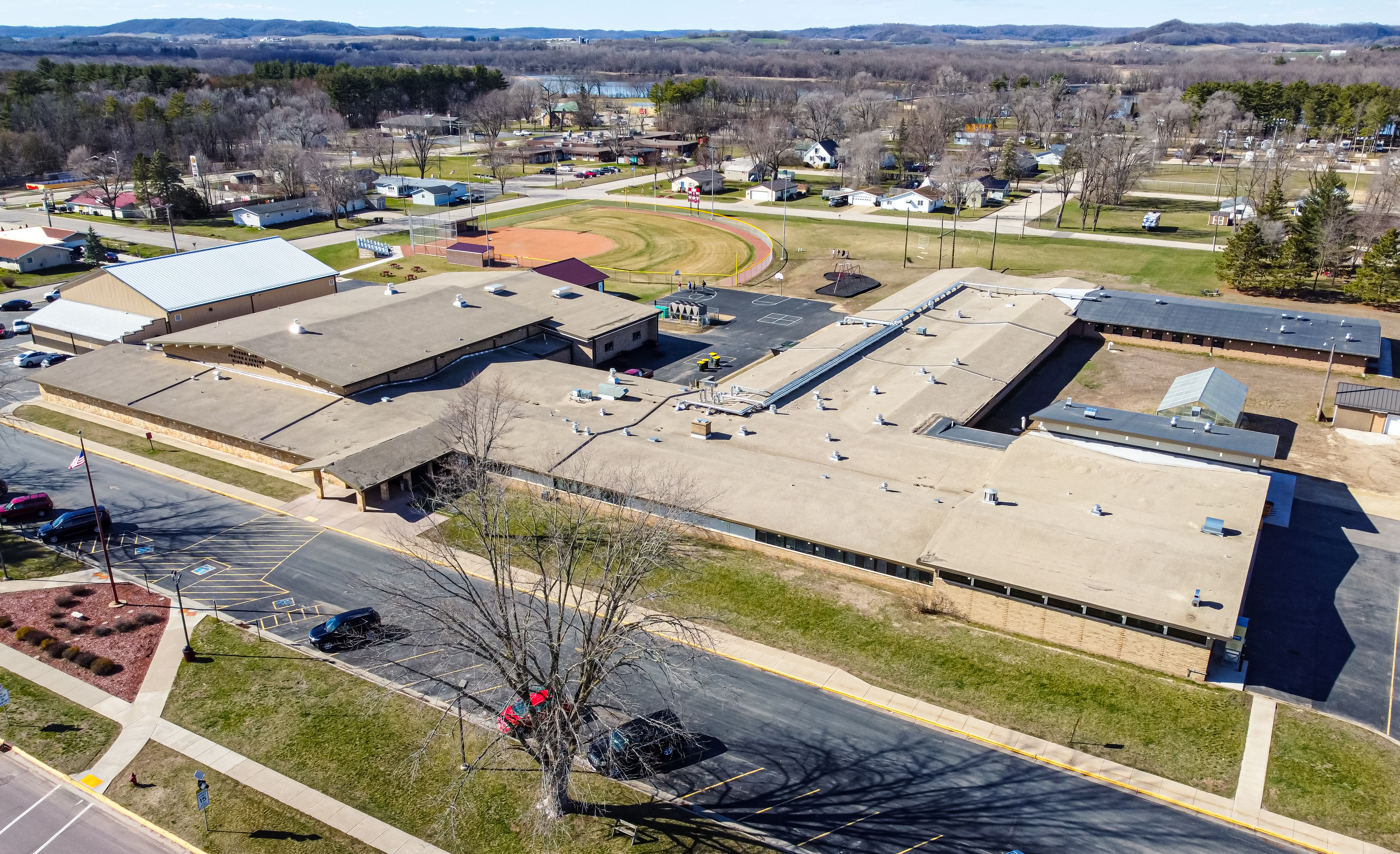

Location
- 235 East Elm Street; Muscoda, (Grant County), Wisconsin 53573; United States

Information
- Type: Public high school
- Principal: Sarah Gruen
- Staff: 14.29 (FTE)
- Enrollment: 195 (2023-2024)
- Student to teacher ratio: 13.65
- Colors: Maroon and white
- Fight song: "Washington and Lee Swing"
- Athletics conference: Southwest Wisconsin Activities
- Nickname: Chieftains

Riverdale Junior and Senior High School is the junior and senior high school for the Riverdale School District. It is located in the Village of Muscoda, Wisconsin. As of June 2021, Jeffrey Campbell is the Principal.

Its boundary includes the villages of Avoca, Blue River, and Muscoda.
