= Avoca, Wisconsin =

- Village
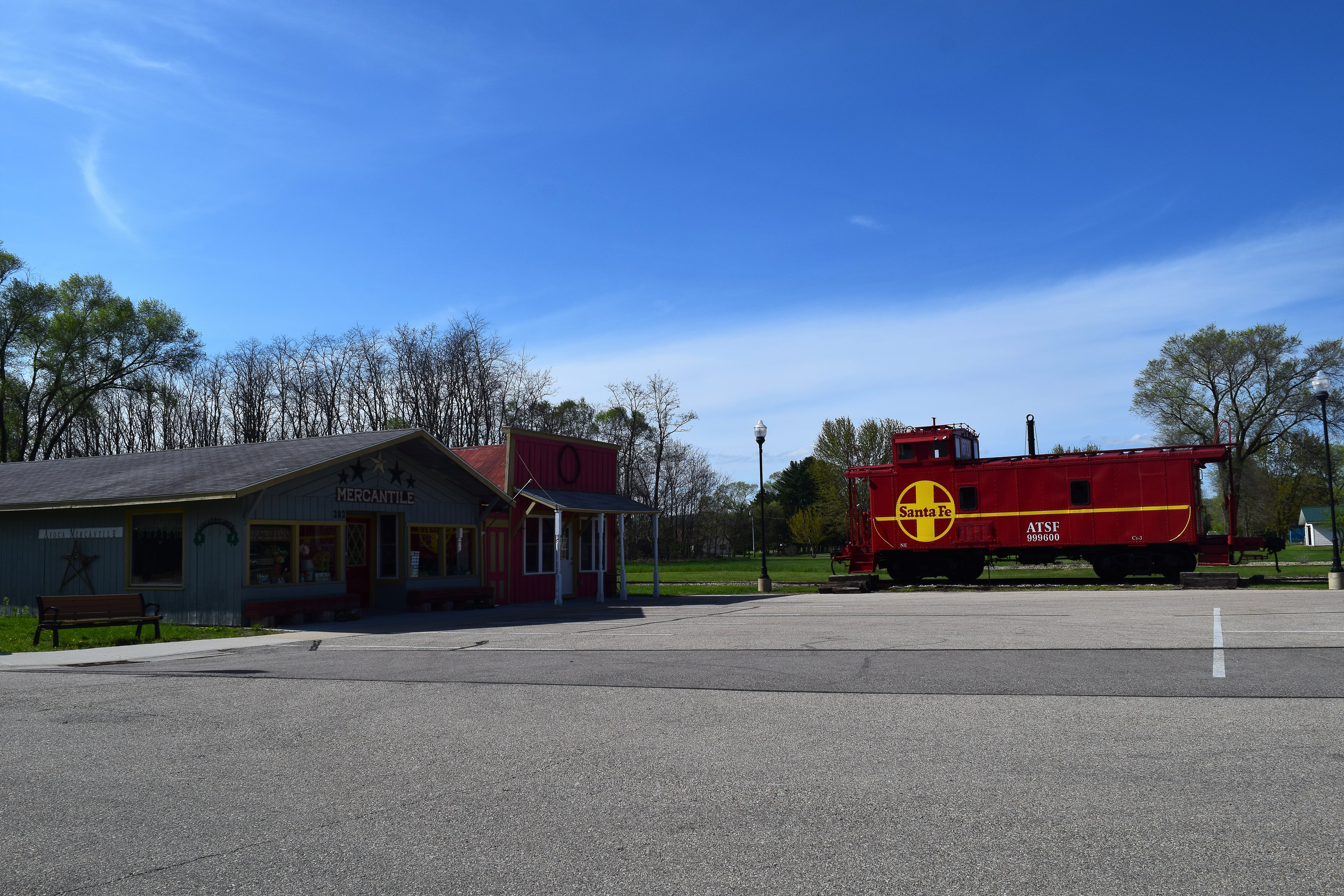
- Avoca Mercantile and an Atchison, Topeka and Santa Fe Railway caboose in Avoca

- Location of Avoca in Iowa County, Wisconsin.
- Coordinates: 43°11′2″N 90°19′31″W
- Country: United States
- State: Wisconsin
- County: Iowa

Area
  - Total: 2.45 sq mi (6.34 km^{2})
  - Land: 2.25 sq mi (5.83 km^{2})
  - Water: 0.20 sq mi (0.51 km^{2})
- Elevation: 699 ft (213 m)

Population (2020)
  - Total: 553
  - Density: 246/sq mi (94.9/km^{2})
- Time zone: UTC-6 (Central (CST))
  - Summer (DST): UTC-5 (CDT)
- Area code: 608
- FIPS code: 55-04025
- GNIS feature ID: 1561035
- Website: http://villageofavocawi.gov

Avoca is a village in Iowa County, Wisconsin, United States. The population was 553 at the 2020 census. It is part of the Madison Metropolitan Statistical Area. It is named after Avoca, County Wicklow in Ireland.

== Geography ==
Avoca is located at 43°11′2″N 90°19′31″W (43.183853, -90.325388).

According to the United States Census Bureau, the village has a total area of 2.44 square miles (6.32 km^{2}), of which 2.31 square miles (5.98 km^{2}) is land and 0.13 square miles (0.34 km^{2}) is water.

== Demographics ==
Historical population
Census	Pop.	Note	%±
1870	418		—
1880	362		−13.4%
1890	278		−23.2%
1900	406		46.0%
1910	436		7.4%
1920	432		−0.9%
1930	342		−20.8%
1940	417		21.9%
1950	424		1.7%
1960	363		−14.4%
1970	421		16.0%
1980	505		20.0%
1990	474		−6.1%
2000	608		28.3%
2010	637		4.8%
2020	553		−13.2%
U.S. Decennial Census

=== 2010 census ===
As of the census of 2010, there were 637 people, 261 households, and 169 families living in the village. The population density was 275.8 inhabitants per square mile (106.5/km^{2}). There were 347 housing units at an average density of 150.2 per square mile (58.0/km^{2}). The racial makeup of the village was 96.4% White, 0.3% African American, 1.7% Asian, 0.5% from other races, and 1.1% from two or more races. Hispanic or Latino of any race were 1.9% of the population.

There were 261 households, of which 32.6% had children under the age of 18 living with them, 48.7% were married couples living together, 10.0% had a female householder with no husband present, 6.1% had a male householder with no wife present, and 35.2% were non-families. 28.4% of all households were made up of individuals, and 11.8% had someone living alone who was 65 years of age or older. The average household size was 2.42 and the average family size was 2.95.

The median age in the village was 39.4 years. 24.8% of residents were under the age of 18; 6.5% were between the ages of 18 and 24; 26.8% were from 25 to 44; 25.5% were from 45 to 64; and 16.6% were 65 years of age or older. The gender makeup of the village was 50.5% male and 49.5% female.

=== 2000 census ===
As of the census of 2000, there were 608 people, 257 households, and 159 families living in the village. The population density was 267.8 people per square mile (103.4/km^{2}). There were 328 housing units at an average density of 144.5 per square mile (55.8/km^{2}). The racial makeup of the village was 98.19% White, 0.16% Native American, 1.15% Asian, 0.16% from other races, and 0.33% from two or more races. Hispanic or Latino of any race were 0.49% of the population.

There were 257 households, out of which 29.2% had children under the age of 18 living with them, 43.2% were married couples living together, 13.2% had a female householder with no husband present, and 38.1% were non-families. 32.3% of all households were made up of individuals, and 15.6% had someone living alone who was 65 years of age or older. The average household size was 2.37 and the average family size was 2.99.

In the village, the population was spread out, with 25.2% under the age of 18, 7.9% from 18 to 24, 27.6% from 25 to 44, 22.5% from 45 to 64, and 16.8% who were 65 years of age or older. The median age was 37 years. For every 100 females, there were 93.6 males. For every 100 females age 18 and over, there were 92.8 males.

The median income for a household in the village was $28,625, and the median income for a family was $31,786. Males had a median income of $25,795 versus $21,750 for females. The per capita income for the village was $16,758. About 12.2% of families and 17.3% of the population were below the poverty line, including 23.9% of those under age 18 and 14.6% of those age 65 or over.

== Education ==
Avoca is served by the Riverdale School District, which operates Riverdale Junior and Senior High School.
