= Muscoda, Wisconsin =

- Village
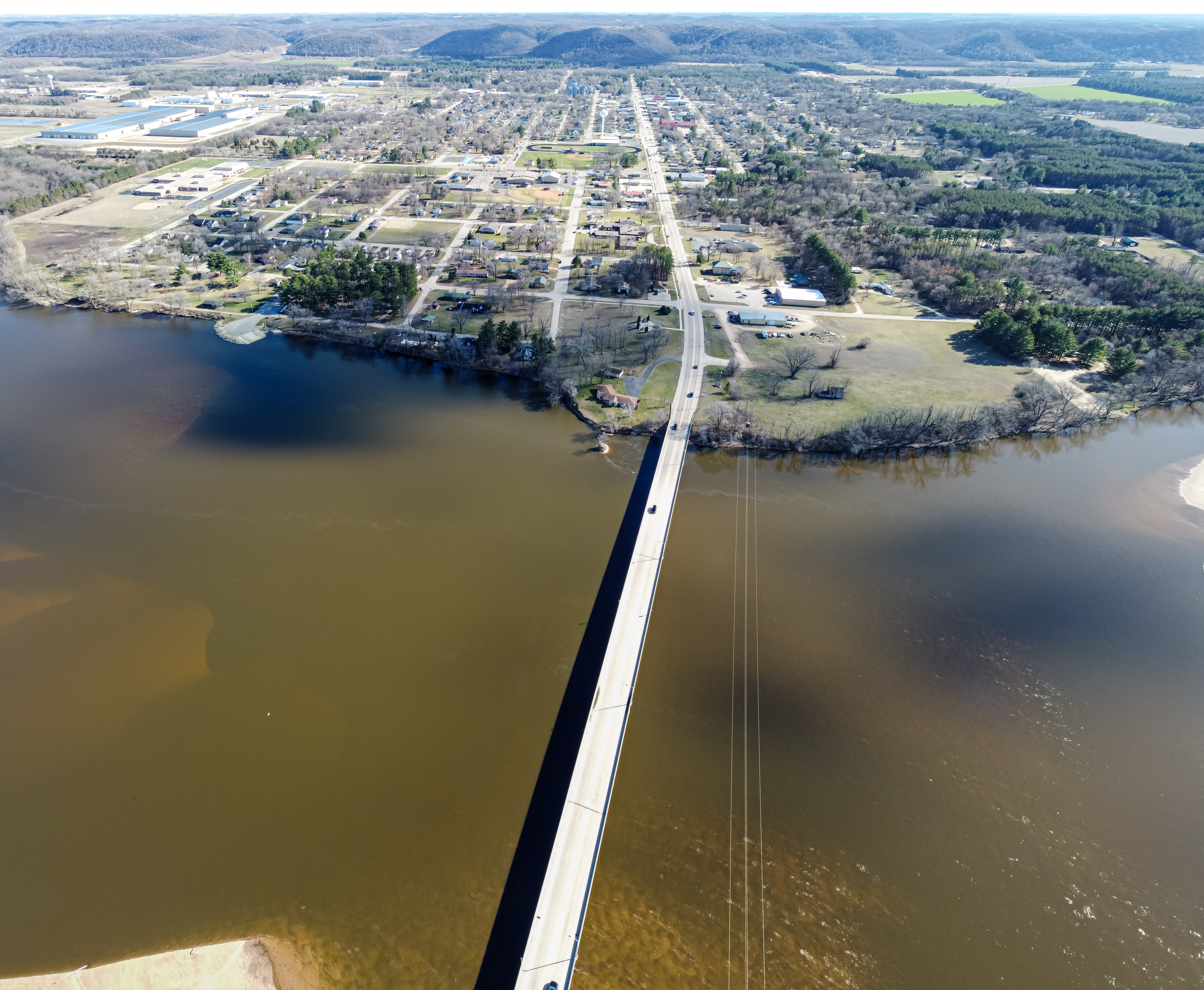
- Wis-80 crosses the Wisconsin River in to Muscoda

- Location of Muscoda in Grant County, Wisconsin.
- Coordinates: 43°10′29″N 90°28′20″W
- Country: United States
- State: Wisconsin
- Counties: Grant, Iowa

Area
  - Total: 1.55 sq mi (4.02 km^{2})
  - Land: 1.55 sq mi (4.02 km^{2})
  - Water: 0 sq mi (0.00 km^{2})
- Elevation: 725 ft (221 m)

Population (2020)
  - Total: 1,307
  - Density: 842/sq mi (325/km^{2})
- Time zone: UTC-6 (Central (CST))
  - Summer (DST): UTC-5 (CDT)
- Area code: 608
- FIPS code: 55-55225
- GNIS feature ID: 1583773
- Website: www.muscoda.com

Muscoda is a village in Grant and Iowa counties in the U.S. state of Wisconsin. The population was 1,307 at the 2020 census. Of this, 1,245 were in Grant County, and 62 were in Iowa County. The Grant County part of the village is adjacent to the Town of Muscoda and the Iowa County part is adjacent to the Town of Pulaski.

== History and culture ==
Explorer and historian William Pidgeon, who visited the area in 1840, reported that Muscoda was "the ancient location of a large Indian village, but at present occupied by a few white families. This village is situated on an extensive plain of sandy soil, on the surface of which may be seen relics of many an ancient mound, varying much in size and form; some resembling redoubts, or fortifications, others presenting the forms of gigantic men, beasts, birds, and reptiles, among which may be found the eagle, the otter, the serpent, the alligator, and others pertaining to the deer, elk, and buffalo species. The highland in the vicinity of this village abounds with monuments that bear testimony to the ancient existence of an immense population in those regions."

Muscoda became known as English Prairie, named for two English fur traders, Abraham Lansing and Garrit Roseboom, who opened a post at the close of the French and Indian War. Lansing and his son were murdered in 1763 by their French assistants and the fame of the murder kept the name English Prairie alive until 1840.

The word Muscoda (pronounced "MUS-co-day") may be a corruption of the Ojibwa (Chippewa) word mashkode, meaning "prairie". It may also have been taken from Longfellow's Hiawatha, in which it is mentioned several times. The word's popular meaning was "Prairie of Flowers".

Muscoda has billed itself as the "Wisconsin's Morel Capital" since 1982 and hosts the "Morel Mushroom Festival" every year on the weekend following Mother's Day. The event includes carnival rides, tractors pulls, tournaments, merchant stands, food booths, and portable tattoo parlors.

== Geography ==
Muscoda is located at 43°11′18″N 90°26′26″W (43.188457, -90.440775), on the Wisconsin River. Large rolling hills border the south of the town, covered in mixed hardwoods, mainly Maple, Red/White Oak, Aspen, Cherry, Elm, and Walnut. 2,100 acres (8.5 km^{2}) of public land hug both the eastern and western sides of Muscoda. These public lands hold a great deal of wildlife for both sports and wildlife enthusiasts.

According to the United States Census Bureau, the village has a total area of 1.46 square miles (3.78 km^{2}), all land.

== Demographics ==
Historical population
Census	Pop.	Note	%±
1880	740		—
1890	605		−18.2%
1900	743		22.8%
1910	798		7.4%
1920	903		13.2%
1930	900		−0.3%
1940	902		0.2%
1950	1,046		16.0%
1960	927		−11.4%
1970	1,099		18.6%
1980	1,331		21.1%
1990	1,287		−3.3%
2000	1,453		12.9%
2010	1,299		−10.6%
2020	1,307		0.6%
U.S. Decennial Census

=== 2010 census ===
As of the census of 2010, there were 1,299 people, 569 households, and 341 families living in the village. The population density was 889.7 inhabitants per square mile (343.5/km^{2}). There were 643 housing units at an average density of 440.4 per square mile (170.0/km^{2}). The racial makeup of the village was 98.9% White, 0.3% African American, 0.3% Native American, 0.1% Asian, and 0.4% from two or more races. Hispanic or Latino of any race were 0.8% of the population.

There were 569 households, of which 27.9% had children under the age of 18 living with them, 42.2% were married couples living together, 10.7% had a female householder with no husband present, 7.0% had a male householder with no wife present, and 40.1% were non-families. 33.9% of all households were made up of individuals, and 13.9% had someone living alone who was 65 years of age or older. The average household size was 2.19 and the average family size was 2.74.

The median age in the village was 40.4 years. 21.6% of residents were under the age of 18; 7.7% were between the ages of 18 and 24; 26.9% were from 25 to 44; 24.3% were from 45 to 64; and 19.6% were 65 years of age or older. The gender makeup of the village was 49.8% male and 50.2% female.

=== 2000 census ===
As of the census of 2000, there were 1,453 people, 610 households, and 384 families living in the village. The population density was 1,069.1 people per square mile (412.5/km^{2}). There were 661 housing units at an average density of 486.3 per square mile (187.7/km^{2}). The racial makeup of the village was 98.42% White, 0.28% Black or African American, 0.21% Native American, 0.07% Asian, and 1.03% from two or more races. Hispanic or Latino of any race were 1.31% of the population.

There were 610 households, out of which 29.7% had children under the age of 18 living with them, 46.9% were married couples living together, 11.0% had a female householder with no husband present, and 36.9% were non-families. 32.1% of all households were made up of individuals, and 15.6% had someone living alone who was 65 years of age or older. The average household size was 2.30 and the average family size was 2.88.

In the village, the population was spread out, with 23.6% under the age of 18, 7.8% from 18 to 24, 27.3% from 25 to 44, 21.3% from 45 to 64, and 20.0% who were 65 years of age or older. The median age was 39 years. For every 100 females, there were 94.0 males. For every 100 females age 18 and over, there were 88.8 males.

The median income for a household in the village was $30,903, and the median income for a family was $38,750. Males had a median income of $29,853 versus $21,058 for females. The per capita income for the village was $15,390. About 7.9% of families and 10.2% of the population were below the poverty line, including 16.3% of those under age 18 and 9.3% of those age 65 or over.

== Education ==
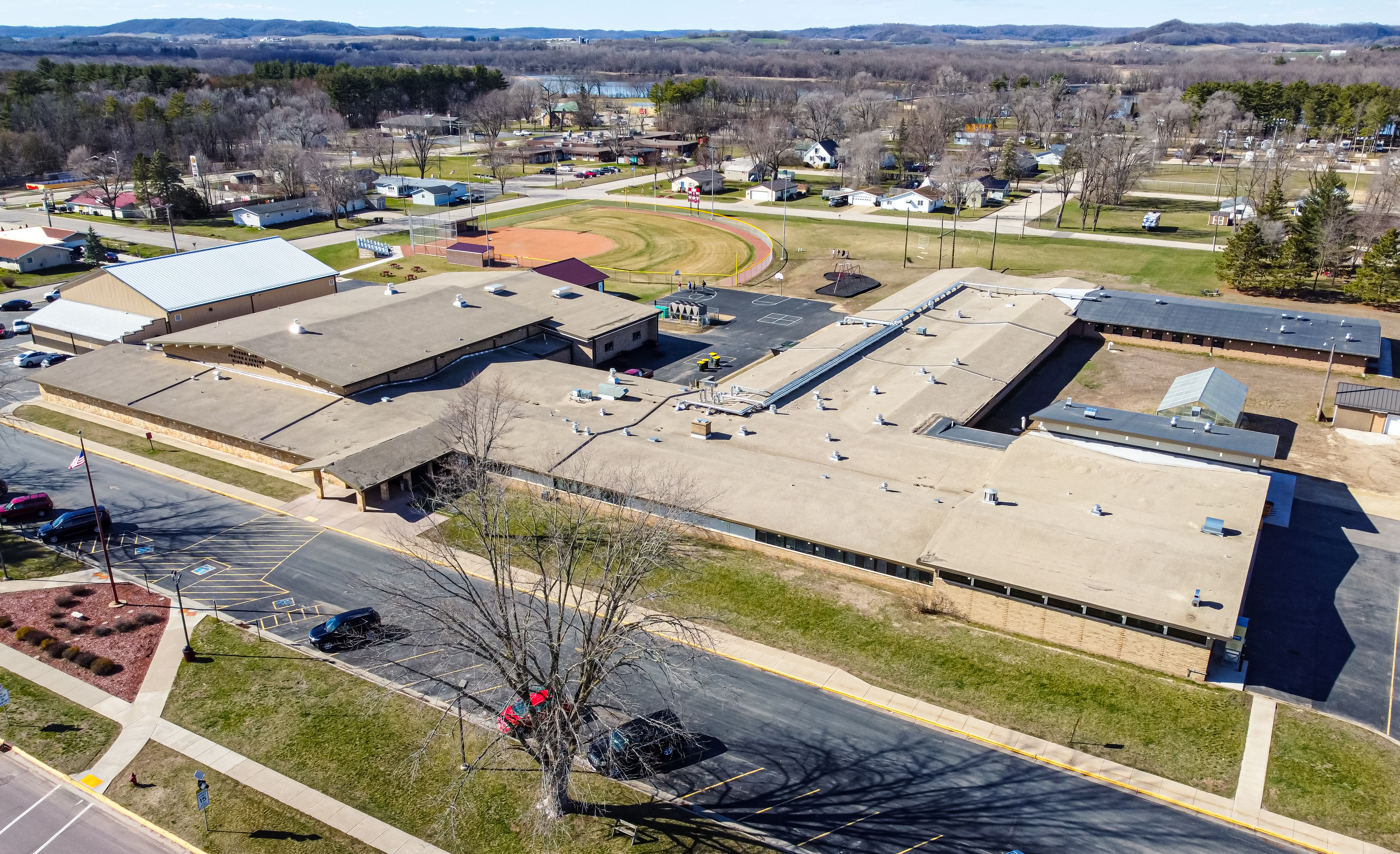
Riverdale High School

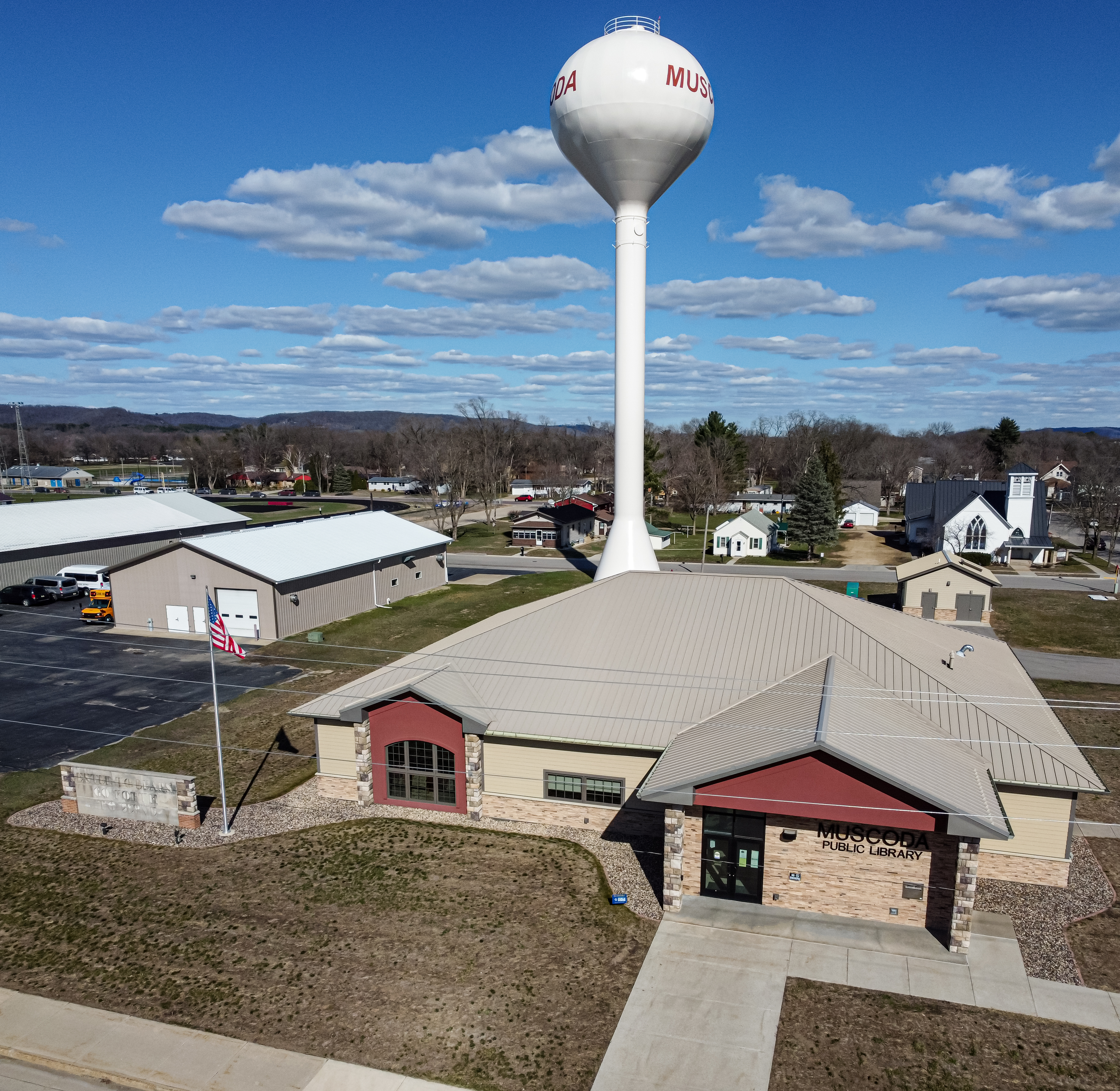
Muscoda public library and water tower

Riverdale School District is the area school district.

Riverdale High School, which is part of the district, is in Muscoda.
