= Anne Plant =

American biochemist

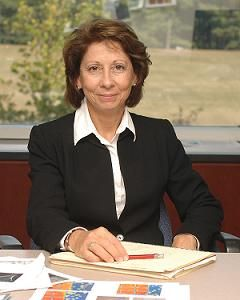
- Education: University of Arizona (BA); University of Nebraska–Lincoln (MS); Baylor College of Medicine (PhD)
- Awards: Department of Commerce Silver Medal (2007)
- Scientific career
- Fields: Biochemistry
- Workplaces: National Institute of Standards and Technology
- Thesis: Aqueous phase transfer of polycyclic aromatic hydrocarbons in model membranes and cells (1983)
- Doctoral advisor: Louis C. Smith
- Other academic advisors: Constance Kies

Anne L. Plant is an American biochemist. She is a Fellow at the National Institute of Standards and Technology where she was previously chief of the biosystems and biomaterials division. Plant investigates measurements and models of cell populations. She is a recipient of the United States Department of Commerce's Bronze and Silver Medals. Plant is a fellow of the American Institute for Medical and Biological Engineering and the American Association for the Advancement of Science.

== Education ==
Plant completed a B.A. with university scholarship honors in biology with minors in math and chemistry in 1976 at University of Arizona. In 1978, she earned a M.S. in human nutrition from University of Nebraska–Lincoln under advisor Constance Kies. Her thesis was titled, The effect of copper and fiber supplementation on copper utilization in humans. Plant earned a Ph.D. in biochemistry from Baylor College of Medicine in 1983. Her doctoral advisor was Louis C. Smith. Plant's dissertation was titled Aqueous phase transfer of polycyclic aromatic hydrocarbons in model membranes and cells.

== Career and research ==
From 1986 to 1995, Plant was a research chemist at National Institute of Standards and Technology (NIST) where she served as project leader of the biosensors multidisciplinary group. During this time, she also was a visiting scientist at the Helmholtz Centre for Infection Research. She was on the research advisory committee for the director of NIST from 1993 to 1996, serving its chairperson for the 1995 to 1996 term. Plant was the scientific advisor to the director of the NIST chemical science and technology laboratory from 1994 to 1995. From 1995 to 2001, Plant was group leader of the biomolecular materials group awhere she coordinated and directed research efforts with a budget of approximately $2 million. She served as a visiting scientist at Max Planck Institute for Polymer Research. She was a visiting scholar in the biology department at Johns Hopkins University from 2000 to 2001 where she researched the effect of extracellular matrix on cell shape and gene expression with Michael Edidin. Plant was the NIST representative to the National Science and Technology Council from 2004 to 2005. She was group leader of the cell systems science group in the biochemical science division at NIST from 2001 to 2012. From 2012 to 2017, she was chief of the biosystems and biomaterials division at NIST where she explores improving measurement assurance for complex biological systems. Her division comprised approximately 80 staff and associates with a budget of $16 million. As of 2019, Plant is a NIST Fellow where she researches measurements and models of cell populations.

Plant's branch researches single-cell measurements from live cell microscopy, and development of theoretical approaches that lead to predictive understanding of complex cellular systems. Currently, Plant examines small molecular networks in engineered induced pluripotent stem cells with a statistical thermodynamics model. The heterogeneity of cellular phenotypes within isogenic populations provides a window into the diversity of ways the cellular machinery can operate to process information. This diversity of expression reflects the stochastic fluctuations that occur as connected network variables interact with one another to effect up- and down-regulation. Plant's lab goals include to measure the kinetic constants for those fluctuations, and the correlations between them, to provide a thermodynamic basis for understanding which cellular measurands are the most important for controlling a particular phenotype. This work is motivated by a critical challenge in characterizing cell-based therapies, namely what should be measured that will provide predictive information about the cell product to assure desirable functionality. Carrying out this study involves a large number of NIST collaborators to address challenges in rapid non-perturbing quantitative imaging, CRISPR-Cas genome editing of reporter iPSC lines, image analysis including the use of CNN inference, and theoretical modeling.

== Awards and honors ==
In 1991 and 2011, Plant received the Department of Commerce Bronze Medal. She was awarded the Department of Commerce Silver Medal in 2007. Plant was elected fellow of the American Institute for Medical and Biological Engineering in 2013. She became a Fellow of the American Association for the Advancement of Science in 2016.
