= Pawnee High School =

High school in Oklahoma, United States

Coordinates: 36°19′59″N 96°48′19″W

Pawnee High School is part of the public school system located in Pawnee, Oklahoma.

There are three schools in the system: an elementary school, a middle school and a high school. The school colors are red, white, and black. The mascot for the high school, middle school, and elementary school mascot is the Black Bear (Bruno).

As of 2023, the superintendent is Stacy Womack, and the principal is Tammy Hixon.

== History ==
Early builders used native sandstone to construct the first school buildings. The original Pawnee High School had only eight classrooms. Local contractor T.M. Grant, completed it in 1900. A three-story building replaced this structure April 1912. It held first- through twelfth-grade classrooms, administration offices, a 700-seat auditorium, and a gymnasium. So large and imposing, it was known locally as the Capitol Building and served the community until 1962.

The school published its first yearbook in 1919. A student who worked on it, Chester Gould, became famous for creating the Dick Tracy comic strip in the 1930s.

In 1943, the Works Project Administration built a new elementary school using rocks from the first school building. Reflecting the segregationist politices of the era, the community built a separate school for African American students in September 1948.

In 1972, Pawnee joined with the Morrison, Glencoe, Stillwater, Mulhall-Orlando, and Guthrie school districts to form a vocational-technical school to help students pursue vocational trades after high school. Meridian Technology Center continues to serve these communities.

The newest building project for the Pawnee Public School system is the 8,000-square-foot domed tornado shelter located in the middle of the elementary school campus. Completed in early 2015, the shelter can fit the entire school population of more than 1,000 people.

== Present day ==
Currently, the school system includes an elementary school for kindergarten through fifth grade, a middle school for grades six through eight, and a high school for grades nine through twelve.

== Notable alumni ==
- Hellen Linkswiler (1932), dietician and nutrition scientist
