= Hellen Linkswiler =

American nutrition scientist (1912–1984)

- Linkswiler c. 1975
- Born: January 5, 1912; Lawton, Oklahoma
- Died: June 24, 1984 (aged 72)
- Education: Oklahoma State University–Stillwater; University of Wisconsin–Madison
- Scientific career
- Fields: Human nutrition
- Workplaces: University of Alabama; University of Nebraska–Lincoln; University of Wisconsin–Madison
- Doctoral advisor: May Reynolds; Carl A. Baumann
- Doctoral students: Constance Kies

Hellen M. Linkswiler (January 5, 1912 – June 24, 1984) was an American dietitian and nutrition scientist who researched human mineral requirements and amino acids. She was a professor of foods and nutrition at the University of Wisconsin–Madison from 1960 to 1981.

== Early life ==
Linkswiler was born in Lawton, Oklahoma on January 5, 1912, to Cleveland and Agnes Linkswiler. She had eight siblings and was raised during the Dust Bowl. In 1932, she graduated from Pawnee High School. She earned a B.S. in home economics education with a minor in English from the Oklahoma State University–Stillwater in 1939.

== Career ==
From 1944 to 1946, Linkswiler served in the SPARS during which time she worked as a dietitian overseeing the baking of hundreds of pies per day. She researched vitamin B6 metabolism at the University of Wisconsin–Madison's department of foods and nutrition. She earned a M.S. in food and nutrition under May Reynolds in 1946 and a Ph.D. with a joint major in food and nutrition and biochemistry in 1951. Reynolds and Carl A. Baumann were her doctoral advisors.

Linkswiler joined the department of food and nutrition at the University of Alabama as an associate professor from 1951 to 1954. She was a professor of foods and nutrition at the University of Nebraska–Lincoln from 1954 to 1960. While there, she became friends with faculty member Hazel Fox. They conducted studies on amino acids in corn. Linkswiler also researched human mineral requirements. In 1960, she joined the faculty at the University of Wisconsin–Madison as a professor in the department of foods and nutrition and was paid US$12,000 (equivalent to $130,596 in 2025) annually.

Following the retirement of her doctoral advisor Reynolds in 1962, she assumed some of her responsibilities. From 1976 to 1979, Linkswiler was treasuer-elect and treasurer of the American Society of Clinical Nutrition, the first non-physician to be elected to an office at the society. She retired in 1981 and was granted emeritus status. In 1983, she became a fellow of the American Institute of Nutrition.

== Personal life ==
Linswiler was a member of the Westwood Christian Church. In 1960, a bank required that she have a male cosigner to qualify her for a mortgage when she moved to Madison, Wisconsin. Linkswiler died June 24, 1984, of cancer.
