= Ruth M. Davis =

American computer scientist

Dr. Ruth M. Davis
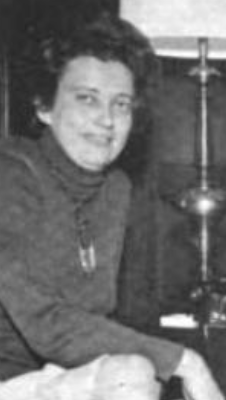
- Ruth M. Davis, from a 1972 publication of the NOAA
- Born: October 19, 1928; Sharpsville, Pennsylvania, U.S.
- Died: March 28, 2012 (aged 83)
- Occupation: Computer scientist
- Honours: Federal Woman's Award (1972); National Academy of Engineering (1976); Ada Lovelace Award of the Association for Women in Computing(1984)

Ruth Margaret Davis (19 October 1928 – 28 March 2012, also known as Ruth Davis Lohr) was an American computer scientist and civil servant who was associated with several major US government research projects. She served as deputy undersecretary of defense for research and advance technology, as assistant secretary of energy for resource applications, and as chair of The Aerospace Corporation.

== Life ==
=== Education and early life ===
Davis was born on October 19, 1928, in Sharpsville, Pennsylvania. She earned a bachelor's degree in mathematics from American University in 1950, and then did graduate studies at the University of Maryland, College Park, with summers working as a computer programmer at the National Bureau of Standards. She became the first woman to earn a Ph.D. in mathematics at the University of Maryland in 1955. Her dissertation, On a regular Cauchy problem for the Euler-Poisson-Darboux equation, was supervised by Alexander Weinstein.

After completing her Ph.D., she applied for a position at IBM, but was turned down because, at the time, they hired women only in secretarial positions. Instead, she worked as a lecturer at the University of Maryland from 1955 to 1957, and then from 1957 to 1958 at American University.

=== Government service ===
At that time, Admiral Hyman G. Rickover was in search of computer programmers for his program to nuclearize the United States Navy, and unlike IBM, "didn’t care if you were yellow, purple, green, or had five arms". He hired Davis among half a dozen other women, and in his service she was the first to write computer code for nuclear reactors. She worked as a research manager at the David Taylor Model Basin from 1958 to 1961, and elsewhere within the Defense Department from 1961 to 1965. During this time she also wrote for the Journal of the Society for Information Display magazine and published several articles on military information display systems and served as Chair of the Society's Honors and Awards committee.

Next, she moved to the National Institutes of Health, where she became associate director for research at the United States National Library of Medicine, and director of the Lister Hill National Center For Biomedical Communications from 1967 to 1970. She also worked in the National Bureau of Standards as director of the Institute for Computer Sciences and Technology, and at the Department of Health, Education, and Welfare. She became deputy undersecretary of defense for research and advance technology from 1977 to 1979, when president Jimmy Carter appointed her as assistant secretary of energy for resource applications.

During her government service, Davis was associated with several major research projects, including the MEDLINE online biomedical information system, satellite-based telemedicine, the Data Encryption Standard, the VHSIC program for developing fast integrated circuits, and the development of directed-energy weapons.

=== Retirement and later life ===
Davis retired from government service in 1980. She founded the Pymatuning Group, a management and technology corporation, and returned to academia as a lecturer at institutions that included her old schools as well as Harvard University, the University of Pennsylvania, the University of Pittsburgh, and the University of California, Berkeley. She became the chair of The Aerospace Corporation from 1992 to 2000, and served on several other corporate boards.

She died on March 28, 2012.

== Recognition and legacy ==
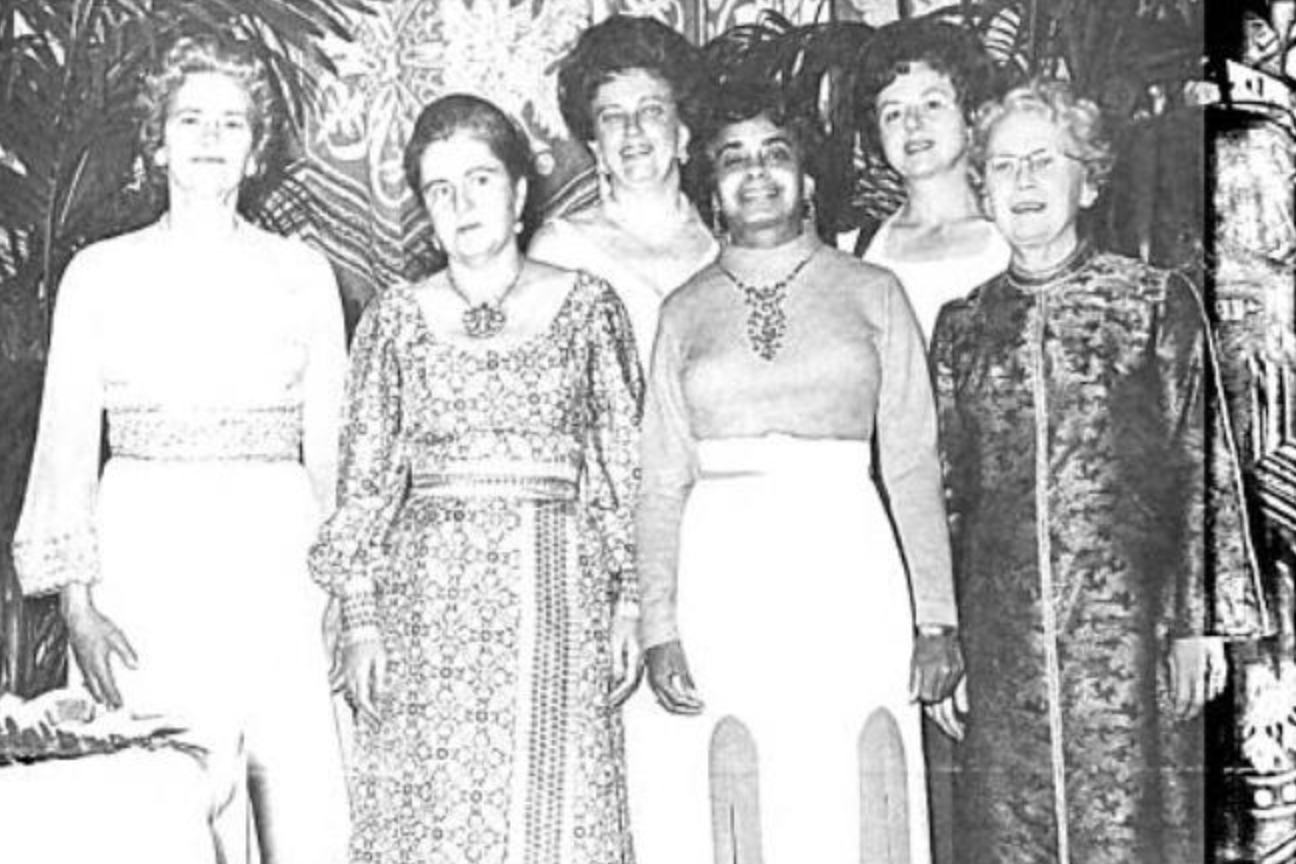
Federal Woman's Award winners in 1972: Mary H. Ferguson, Patricia Ann McCreedy, Ruth Margaret Davis, Phyllis Dixon Clemmons, Lois Albro Chatham, and Ruth M. Leverton

Davis won the Federal Woman's Award in 1972. She was elected to the National Academy of Engineering in 1976, "for contributions to computer science, particularly information science technology". She also became a member of the National Academy of Public Administration and, in 1990, the American Academy of Arts and Sciences.

She won the Department of Commerce Gold Medal in 1972, the Defense Distinguished Service Medal in 1979, and the Ada Lovelace Award of the Association for Women in Computing in 1984, among other awards. Carnegie Mellon University and the University of Maryland gave her honorary doctorates, in 1979 and 1993 respectively.

At the University of Maryland, the Ruth M. Davis Professorship in Mathematics was established by Davis in 2003. As of 2018, it is held by Jonathan Rosenberg.
