= Ruth M. Leverton =

American home economist

- Born: March 23, 1908
- Died: September 14, 1982 (aged 74)

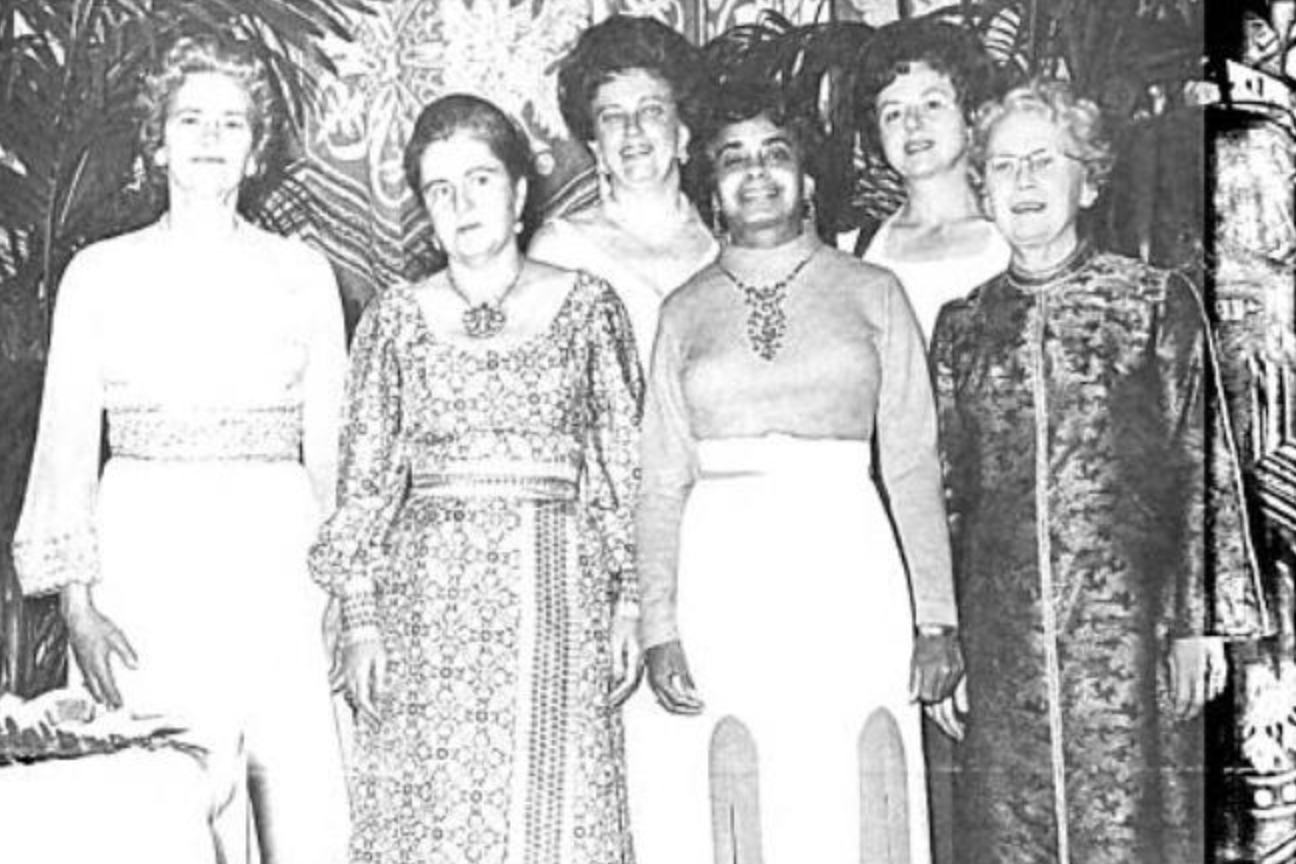
Federal Woman's Award winners in 1972: Mary H. Ferguson, Patricia Ann McCreedy, Ruth Margaret Davis, Phyllis Dixon Clemmons, Lois Albro Chatham, and Ruth M. Leverton

Ruth M. Leverton (March 23, 1908 – September 14, 1982) was an American home economist, known for her groundbreaking research on protein metabolism. She was a pioneer in using human subjects for controlled feeding studies, where participants lived in university live-in facilities alongside nonparticipants to study nutrient interactions. She was one of the six winners of the Federal Woman's Award in 1972.

== See also ==
- Constance Kies
