= Cosette Kies =

American writer, librarian, and academic

- Born: September 2, 1936; Platteville, Wisconsin, US
- Died: September 18, 2004 (aged 68); Reno, Nevada, US
- Occupations: Writer, librarian, academic

Academic background
- Education: University of Wisconsin–Madison (MA); Columbia University (DLS)

Academic work
- Discipline: Occultism
- Institutions: Northern Illinois University

Cosette Nell Kies (September 2, 1936 – September 18, 2004) was an American writer, librarian, and academic. She was a professor and occult researcher at Northern Illinois University where she served as chair of library and information services. Kies wrote on topics including public relations and marketing for libraries and horror fiction for young adults.

== Life ==
Kies was a native of Platteville, Wisconsin. Her sister was nutrition scientist Constance Kies.

Kies completed a M.A. from University of Wisconsin–Madison in 1961. Her thesis was titled Eskimo Art: A Survey. On August 2, 1962, she became the children's librarian at Fond du Lac Public Library. Kies resigned on April 4, 1963, from her position at the library.

She was a librarian at University of Nebraska–Lincoln in 1967.

She was named assistant program coordinator of the divisional services department at the American Library Association in December 1967, with her term set to begin January 1.

In 1970, Kies was a library career consultant at the Illinois State Careers Center.

She was New York-based a public relations consultant, teacher, and author in 1975.

Kies earned a Doctor of Liberal Studies from Columbia University in 1977. Her dissertation was titled Unofficial relations, personal reliance, informal influence, communication, and the library staff: a sociometric investigation of three medium-sized public libraries.

In 1983, Kies was the president of Nashville's chapter of the Women's National Book Association.

She was a professor and occult researcher at Northern Illinois University in 1983. Her work traced the origins of Halloween to the Celts and witchcraft. In 1991, Kies was the chair of Northern Illinois University Library and Information Services.

Kies advocated for the inclusion of youth horror fiction as a way to encourage teenagers to visit libraries.

== Selected works ==
- Kies, Cosette N. (1974). Problems in Library Public Relations. R. R. Bowker Company. ISBN 978-0-8352-0678-5.
- Kies, Cosette N. (1976). Writing a library newsrelease. Nashville: School of Library Science, George Peabody College. OCLC 4404635.
- Kies, Cosette N. (1978). Projecting a Positive Image Through Public Relations: Including a Communication Audit for School Media Centers. American Association of School Librarians. ISBN 978-0-8389-3219-3. OCLC 1059818184.
- Kies, Cosette N., ed. (1982). The Literary Allusions Cookbook. Sylvia Graham. Women's National Book Association, Nashville. OCLC 9035241.
- Kies, Cosette N. (1986). The Occult in the Western World: An Annotated Bibliography. Library Professional Publications. ISBN 978-0-208-02113-7. OCLC 13396514.
- Kies, Cosette N. (1987). Supernatural fiction for teens: 500 good paperbacks to read for wonderment, fear, and fun. Libraries Unlimited. ISBN 978-0-87287-602-6. OCLC 15789955.
- Kies, Cosette (1987). Marketing and Public Relations for Libraries. Scarecrow. ISBN 978-99937-652-3-3. OCLC 948526472.
- Kies, Cosette N. (1992). Presenting Young Adult Horror Fiction. Twayne Publishers. ISBN 978-0-8057-8215-8. OCLC 1089583781.
- Kies, Cosette N. (1993). Presenting Lois Duncan. Twayne Publishers. ISBN 978-0-8057-8221-9.
