= Constance Kies =

American dietitian and nutrition scientist (1934–1993)

- Born: Constance Virginia Kies; December 13, 1934; Blue River, Wisconsin, US
- Died: November 30, 1993 (aged 58); Lincoln, Nebraska, US
- Education: Wisconsin State College, Platteville (BS); University of Wisconsin–Madison (MS, PhD)
- Awards: Borden Award (1973)
- Scientific career
- Fields: Nutritional biochemistry
- Workplaces: University of Nebraska–Lincoln
- Academic advisors: Hellen Linkswiler
- Notable students: Anne Plant

Constance Virginia Kies (December 13, 1934 – November 30, 1993) was an American nutrition scientist and dietitian. Kies worked as a public school teacher for three years before going against the traditional gender norms of her time and completing an M.S. and Ph.D. from the University of Wisconsin–Madison. Over the duration of her 30-year career at the University of Nebraska–Lincoln, Kies researched nutritional biochemistry. She demonstrated relationships between minerals, proteins, and dietary fiber through pioneering human subject research. Her findings led to advancements in human knowledge of copper and protein metabolism. She was honored with the Borden Award and was a fellow of the American College of Nutrition. Kies was a feminist and a member of the National Organization for Women and the Women's Equity Action League. She died of uterine cancer three months after her diagnosis.

== Early life and education ==
Kies was born on December 13, 1934, in Blue River, Wisconsin. Her mother had been an educator and her father was superintendent of the school system. As a child, her family, including Kies and her three sisters, Cosette, Camilla, and Carolyn moved to a farm in Platteville, Wisconsin. She was the valedictorian at her graduation from Platteville High School. Kies attended Wisconsin State College, Platteville, where she earned a Regents Fellowship and other academic honors. In 1955, she completed a B.S. in English with minors in history, geography, library science, and home economics. After graduation, Kies worked as a public school teacher for three years. During this period, Kies determined that she had become an educator because of traditional gender norms. Kies saved money for graduate school and studied human physiology while she continued teaching. She earned an M.S. in foods and nutrition in 1960 and a Ph.D. in human nutrition and medical physiology in 1963 from the University of Wisconsin–Madison. Her master's thesis was titled "Studies in Urinary Nitrogen Excretion". Kies' dissertation was titled "Effect of Essential to Non-essential Amino Acid Relationships in Adult Man and in the Rat".

As a graduate researcher, Kies worked in the laboratories of Hellen Linkswiler and May Reynolds in the department of home economics. She was a research assistant tasked with managing the nutrition program's "diet squads" of research participants in metabolic studies. She also worked as a part-time dietitian at the Wisconsin General Hospital. Her research focused on nonspecific nitrogen including nonessential amino acids, excess essential amino acids, and nonprotein sources including urea and diammonium citrate.

== Career ==
After completing her doctorate, Kies joined the University of Nebraska (NU) in 1963 as an assistant professor in the department of food and nutrition. She was promoted to associate professor in 1965 and full professor in 1968. She would remain at Lincoln for the remainder of her 30-year career. Her investigations focused on nutritional biochemistry. Throughout her career, Kies was a prolific writer. In 1965, she published her first paper in the Journal of Nutrition. Kies published thirteen papers in that journal. Her work can be found in other journals including The American Journal of Clinical Nutrition, Federation Proceedings and the Journal of the American College of Nutrition. She wrote over 100 peer-reviewed journal articles and authored books and chapters about minerals and plant proteins. Kies organized national iron, calcium, and copper-related conferences. She later edited monographs of these conferences. Kies reported in 1974 that she spent 70% of her time researching at the NU Experiment Station with the rest of her time devoted to teaching nutrition courses. She also participated in women's issues, serving as coordinator of the NU class on "Women in Contemporary Society." In 1974, she was the advisor for the NU Women's Resource Center and the University Women's Action Group. Kies identified as a feminist and was a member of the National Organization for Women and the Women's Equity Action League. In her experience, she witnessed more discrimination against women in academia and research than in the commercial sector. She found that a large issue in addressing these problems lay in difficulties changing unconscious discrimination. Kies also believed that women in home economics are not always taken as seriously by academics in other disciplines due to gender bias.

Kies became a well-known researcher who attended numerous domestic and international conferences. In 1987, Kies received a distinguished visiting faculty award from the Ministry of Health of the People's Republic of China through which she worked with the Ministry and the Department of Food Hygiene at Shandong University. In China, she taught the methodology of conducting human metabolic studies. Kies recruited several Chinese students to pursue their education in the United States. Kies was a member of the American Institute of Nutrition, the American Dietetic Association, the Institute of Food Technologists, the American Oil Chemists' Society, the American Society for Parenteral and Enteral Nutrition, and the Society for Nutrition Education. She was a certified home economist and a registered dietitian. During her career at Lincoln, served as the major professor for approximately 173 M.S. students and 32 Ph.D. students. Kies continued advising students after her August 1993 uterine cancer diagnosis.

=== Research ===
Kies' early research was in amino acids and nitrogen excretion. Kies' advancements in the understanding of protein metabolism stemmed from her pioneering use of human subjects to research nutrients and their interactions through controlled feeding studies. In these studies, research participants lived in university live-in facilities alongside nonparticipants. In exchange for housing, American and international students participated in feeding studies that involved controlled diets and the collection of urine and stool samples. Her research found that the essential amino acid and mineral requirements did not vary by race, ethnicity or sex. Conversely, Kies found that plasma lipoproteins and lipids varied among races with Asian women having higher values. The controlled feeding studies cost $10,000 per participant and were funded by the Nebraska University Agricultural Experiment Station and the Institute of Agriculture and Natural Resources. Kies conducted five to six of these studies a year.

In 1973, Kies' work in the agronomy program entailed testing the nutritional value of new lines of wheat developed by plant breeders. The NU food and nutrition department chair Hazel Metz Fox remarked that Kies was a "creative researcher" who was adept in both basic and applied research. Kies' research focus explored human nutritional requirements and the nutritional value of processed foods. Their study found that butanediol and urea are potentially valuable nutritional additives for humans based on their lack of demonstrated toxicity, low cost, and availability.

Kies investigated the nutritional needs of children with Fox. Focusing on preschool-aged children, they studied the urine levels of creatinine, nitrogen, thiamin, riboflavin, pantothenic acid and niacin. They also compared differences between low and high-income children. In 1974, Kies' research interest included human nutrient requirements and how nutrients interact with each other, and awareness of and attitudes toward nutrition in different communities. With Fox, Kies researched the nutrition knowledge and attitudes of farmers and wheat and beef producers in Nebraska.

By 1987, she had investigated the nutrition of meat and cereal products for ten years. From 1983 to 1987, Kies focused on trace minerals such as manganese. Her research suggested that many Americans, especially women, did not consume enough manganese. Kies' findings corroborated those of biologist Paul Saltman. Both Kies and Saltman's research suggested that manganese-deficient diets resulted in progressively weaker bones in both animals and humans. In 1989, Kies led a study on human nutrition in bottle-fed, breast-fed diabetic, and breast-fed non-diabetic babies. The department was specifically analyzing the manganese, potassium, and sodium levels in diabetic and non-diabetic mothers and their infants. This involved collecting nearly 2,000 dirty diapers a day. This "dirty diaper" study first began at the University of Nebraska Omaha but later moved to the East Campus at NU.

Kies researched nitrogen balance and the use of urea as a nitrogen source for ruminants. Her research revealed that urea could be effectively used in human metabolism to maintain a nitrogen balance. She found that protein quantity was just as important as protein quality. Kies and Fox demonstrated that increases in low-quality protein foods can support nutritional requirements of human adults.

Kies shifted from researching nonspecific nitrogen to inter-nutrient metabolism. She was most interested in the relationships between minerals, dietary fiber, and fat. Her laboratory examined hemicellulose, cellulose, and pectin. They found that hemicellulose increased the levels of zinc, copper, and magnesium in fecal excretions. She also found that supplementing hemicellulose improved urinary excretion of vitamin C. Kies discovered that pectin and zinc decreased urinary excretion of vitamin C. Her later research explored the relationship between dietary fat and mineral absorption. She observed correlations between the absorption rate of iron, zinc, and manganese and decreased intake of dietary cholesterol and fat. She found that consuming dietary fiber reduced total and LDL-cholesterol. Kies found that calcium supplements increased copper absorption while magnesium, selenium, and potassium decreased it. Kies demonstrated that phytates, tannins, and dietary fiber inhibited dietary copper utilization.

== Personal life ==
Kies was interested in Inuit and Native American weaving, carving, sculpture, and pottery because she was intrigued by pieces she could touch. She was also a fan of reading and classical music. Kies died of uterine cancer in Lincoln, Nebraska, on November 30, 1993, at the age of 58. She was cremated and her ashes were placed in her family's plot in Platteville, Wisconsin. Services were held at the home economics auditorium on NU's East Campus.

== Awards and honors ==
Kies received the Borden Award and $1,000 from the American Home Economics Association in 1973 in recognition of her research in the field of nutrition and experimental foods. She was honored with the University of Wisconsin-Platteville's alumni award in 1974. In 1983, Kies won the Outstanding Research Award from Ross Laboratories. In 1986, she received the Distinguished Service Award from the American Chemical Society. She became a fellow of the American College of Nutrition in 1989. Also in 1989, she received the University of Nebraska–Lincoln Distinguished Faculty Scholar Award from the College of Home Economics. She was nominated for the Outstanding Faculty Teaching Award by the College of Home Economics in 1989, 1990, and 1991.

== Selected works ==
=== Books ===
- Kies, Constance, ed. (1987). Nutritional Bioavailability of Manganese. Washington, D.C.: American Chemical Society. ISBN 0-8412-1433-6. OCLC 16682809.
- Kies, Constance, ed. (1990). Copper Bioavailability and Metabolism. Boston, Massachusetts: Springer US. ISBN 9781461305378. OCLC 840280990.
- Kies, Constance; Driskell, Judy A. (1995). Sports Nutrition: Minerals and Electrolytes. CRC Press. ISBN 978-0-8493-7916-1.

=== Book chapters ===
- Kies, Constance; Fox, Hazel Metz (1978), "Urea as a Dietary Supplement for Humans", Nutritional Improvement of Food and Feed Proteins, Advances in Experimental Medicine and Biology, vol. 105, Springer US, pp. 103–118, doi:10.1007/978-1-4684-3366-1_7, ISBN 978-1-4684-3366-1, PMID 727010
- Kies, Constance; Umoren, Josephine (1989), "Inhibitors of Copper Bioutilization: Fiber, Lead, Phytate and Tannins", Copper Bioavailability and Metabolism, vol. 258, Springer US, pp. 81–93, doi:10.1007/978-1-4613-0537-8_7, ISBN 978-1-4613-0537-8, PMID 2560609
- Kies, Constance; Harms, Janice M. (1989), "Copper Absorption as Affected by Supplemental Calcium, Magnesium, Manganese, Selenium and Potassium", Copper Bioavailability and Metabolism, vol. 258, Springer US, pp. 45–58, doi:10.1007/978-1-4613-0537-8_4, ISBN 978-1-4613-0537-8, PMID 2697140

=== Journal articles ===
- Kies, Constance; Fox, Hazel Metz (1970). "Effect of Level of Total Nitrogen Intake on Second Limiting Amino Acid in Corn for Humans". The Journal of Nutrition. 100 (11): 1275–1285. doi:10.1093/jn/100.11.1275. ISSN 0022-3166. PMID 5476429.
- Kies, Constance (1972). "Nonspecific nitrogen in the nutrition of human beings". Federation Proceedings. 31 (3): 1172–1177. ISSN 0014-9446. PMID 4555777.
- Kies, Constance (1988). "Mineral utilization of vegetarians: impact of variation in fat intake". The American Journal of Clinical Nutrition. 48 (3): 884–887. doi:10.1093/ajcn/48.3.884. ISSN 0002-9165. PMID 3414595.

== See also ==
- List of female scientists in the 20th century
- Ruth M. Leverton
- Timeline of women in science in the United States
