= Muscoda (town), Wisconsin =

Town in Grant County, Wisconsin

Muscoda, Wisconsin
- Town
- Town of Muscoda
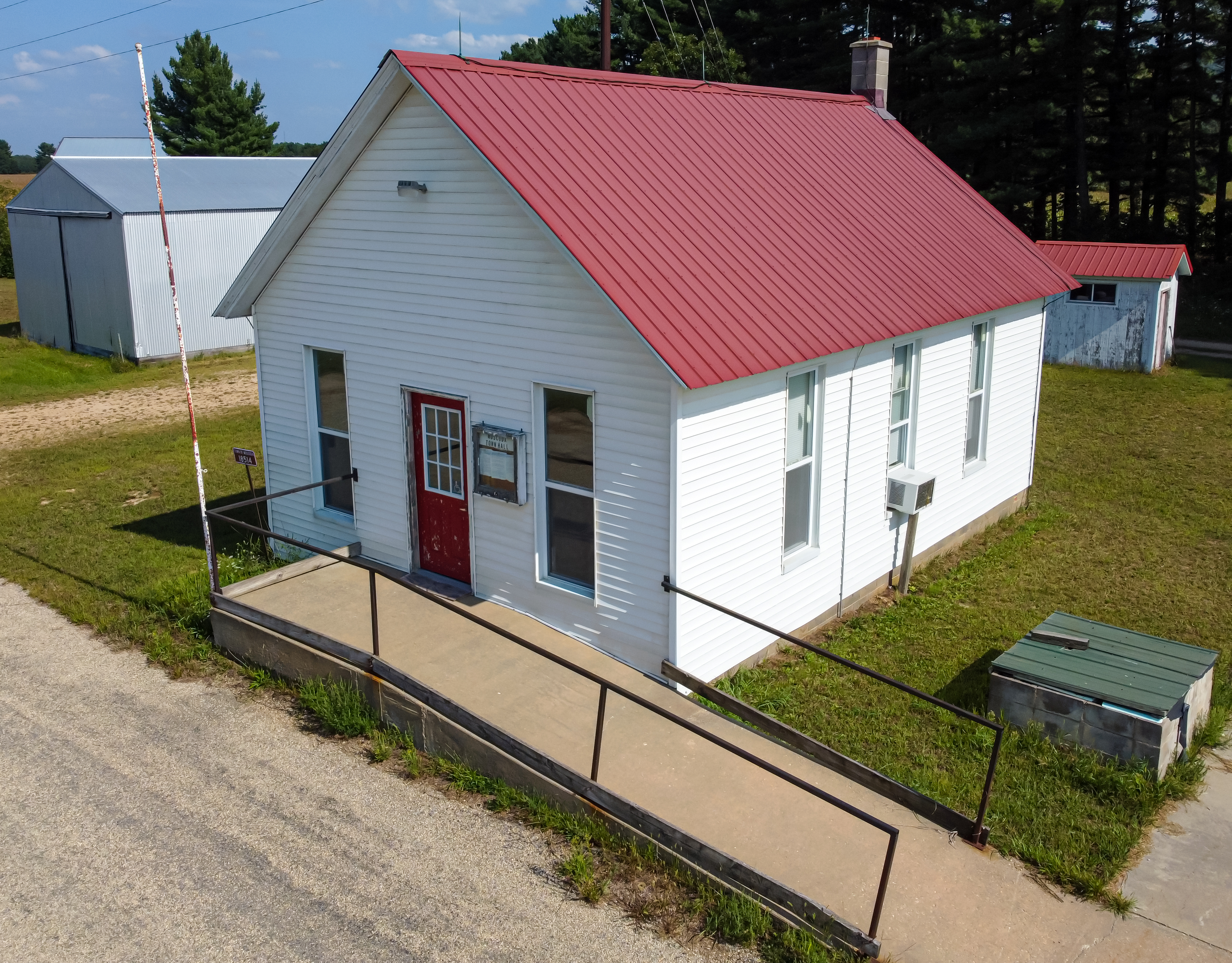
- Muscoda Town Hall

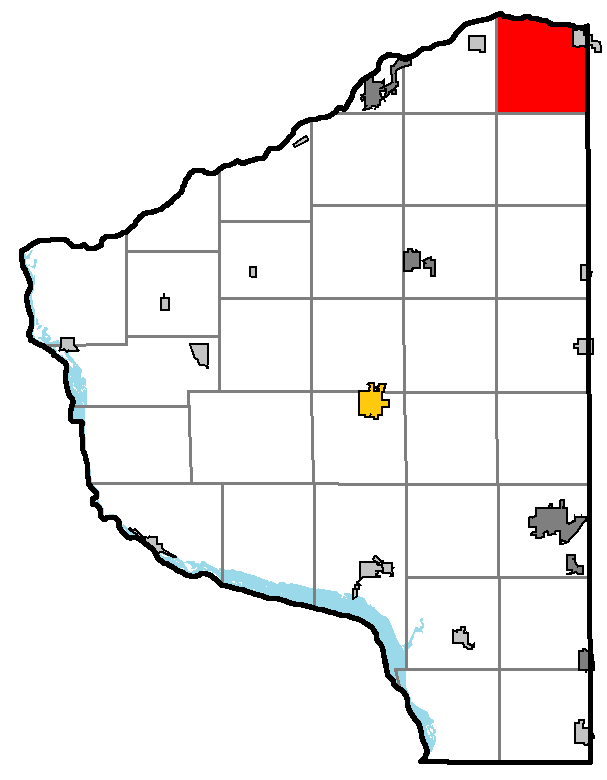
- Location of Muscoda in Grant County, Wisconsin

- Location of Grant County, Wisconsin
- Coordinates: 43°09′52″N 90°29′17″W
- Country: United States
- State: Wisconsin
- County: Grant

Area
  - Total: 34.43 sq mi (89.2 km^{2})
  - Land: 33.31 sq mi (86.3 km^{2})
  - Water: 1.12 sq mi (2.9 km^{2})

Population (2020)
  - Total: 754
  - Density: 22.6/sq mi (8.74/km^{2})
- Time zone: UTC-6 (Central (CST))
  - Summer (DST): UTC-5 (CDT)
- ZIP Code: 53573
- Area code(s): 608 and 353
- GNIS feature ID: 1583774

Muscoda is a town in Grant County, Wisconsin, United States. The population was 754 at the 2020 census. The Village of Muscoda is located partially within the town.

== Geography ==
According to the United States Census Bureau, the town has a total area of 34.6 square miles (89.6 km^{2}), of which 33.5 square miles (86.7 km^{2}) is land and 1.1 square miles (2.9 km^{2}) (3.21%) is water.

== Demographics ==
At the 2000 United States census there were 674 people, 251 households, and 180 families living in the town. The population density was 20.1 people per square mile (7.8/km^{2}). There were 313 housing units at an average density of 9.3 per square mile (3.6/km^{2}). The racial makeup of the town was 98.66% White, 0.30% Black or African American, 0.30% Native American, 0.45% from other races, and 0.30% from two or more races. 0.74% of the population were Hispanic or Latino of any race. Of the 251 households 34.3% had children under the age of 18 living with them, 58.6% were married couples living together, 7.6% had a female householder with no husband present, and 27.9% were non-families. 23.1% of households were one person and 8.4% were one person aged 65 or older. The average household size was 2.69 and the average family size was 3.13.

The age distribution was 27.3% under the age of 18, 9.1% from 18 to 24, 26.6% from 25 to 44, 26.4% from 45 to 64, and 10.7% 65 or older. The median age was 36 years. For every 100 females, there were 110.6 males. For every 100 females age 18 and over, there were 110.3 males.

The median household income was $34,750 and the median family income was $37,031. Males had a median income of $28,750 versus $19,286 for females. The per capita income for the town was $17,175. About 8.3% of families and 10.3% of the population were below the poverty line, including 10.5% of those under age 18 and 9.6% of those age 65 or over.
