= Pauline Kies =

South African botanist (1918–1999)

Pauline Kies (5 January 1918 Stellenbosch - 28 January 1999 Mossel Bay) was a South African botanical illustrator and botanist best known for her works "Flowering Plants of the Southern Cape" (Still Bay Trust, 1986), and “More Flowering Plants of the Southern Cape” (1995) under the name 'Pauline Bohnen'. She was the daughter of prof. Charles Frederick Kies (20 October 1885 Harrismith) and Hermine Krige (24 March 1887 Stellenbosch). The standard author abbreviation Kies is used to indicate this person as the author when citing a botanical name. Her collected specimens number some 1000, and were mainly from the south-western Cape, Fauresmith and Pretoria regions.

She was educated at the Huguenot College in Wellington in the period 1935–39, graduating with an M.Sc. She then worked for a year (1940) at Kirstenbosch National Botanical Garden, followed by the National Herbarium in Pretoria during 1941–43, after which she took up nursing in 1943–45. She rejoined the staff of the National Herbarium in 1946–50, during which period (1948–50) she served as Liaison Officer at Kew.

On 17 December 1949, in London, she married fellow South African Hendrik Thomas Bohnen (21 April 1917 - 9 November 2018), resigning her position at Kew six months later and returning to Pretoria after the birth of her daughter in 1952. She moved to Stilbaai in 1977, and later to Riversdale.

The Pauline Bohnen Nature Reserve at Stilbaai, an important limestone fynbos area, was proclaimed in 1982.

Her father, Charles Frederick Kies, was a noted church figure who, after serving as a missionary in former Northern Rhodesia, filled the chair of Professor of Theology at the Huguenot College in Wellington. He was also a member of the commission (1920–32) tasked with translating the Bible into Afrikaans, and wrote various papers on theology and books for children.

== Family ==
Pauline's children

1. Hermien Bohnen (17 March 1952 London) x Theo Heinrich Johannes
2. Hendrik Thomas Ewert Bohnen (23 December 1956 Pretoria) x René Badenhorst (24 August 1958 Estcourt)

Pauline's siblings

1. Louisa Philippa Kies (1912–1961) x Johannes Cornelius Michael Els
2. Johanna Hermiena Kies (1914) x Ockert Fourie
3. Christina Frederika Kies (1921) x Ellen Olivier (1920–2003)
4. Carolina Wilhelma Kies (1923) x Nicolaas Stofberg
5. Carl Wilhelm Kies (1927–2009) x Susan Hugo
6. Susanna Elisabeth Kies (1928) x Helgaard van Rensburg
7. Anna Maria Kies (1928) x Samuel Buckle
8. Jacob Daniel Kies (1930) x Anna Coen.
