= Kiesel (surname) =

Kiesel (German for "pebble") is a surname. Notable people with the surname include:

- Annemieke Kiesel (born 1979), Dutch female football player
- Bob Kiesel (1911–1993), American sprinter
- Brianna Kiesel (born 1993), American basketball player
- Dan Kiesel (born 1938), Israeli-German sports physiotherapist and osteopath
- Hans Dieter Kiesel, German curler
- Helmuth Kiesel (born 1947), German literary studies scholar
- Herbert Kiesel (1931–2015), Swiss bobsledder
- Kevin Kiesel (born 1959), American college football coach
- Ryan Kiesel (1980–2025), American lawyer and politician in Oklahoma
- Susi Kiesel, German curler

== See also ==
- Brett Keisel (born 1978), American football player
