= Boscobel =

Boscobel may refer to:

== Locations ==
- Boscobel, Jamaica
- Boscobel, Shropshire, England
- Boscobel, Wisconsin, United States
- Boscobel (town), Wisconsin, United States

== Other ==
- Boscobel House, a former hunting lodge at Boscobel, Shropshire, associated with the escape of Charles II after the Battle of Worcester.
- Boscobel (mansion), Garrison, New York, United States
- Boscobel (Nebraska City, Nebraska), historic house in Nebraska City, Nebraska
- Boscobel (novel), an 1872 novel by William Harrison Ainsworth

== See also ==
- Boscobel Aerodrome
- Boscobel Airport
- Boscobel College
- Boscobel Cottage
- The Boscobel Dial
- Boscobel Grand Army of the Republic Hall
- Boscobel High School
- Boscabel, Western Australia
