= Boscobel Grand Army of the Republic Hall =

- U.S. National Register of Historic Places
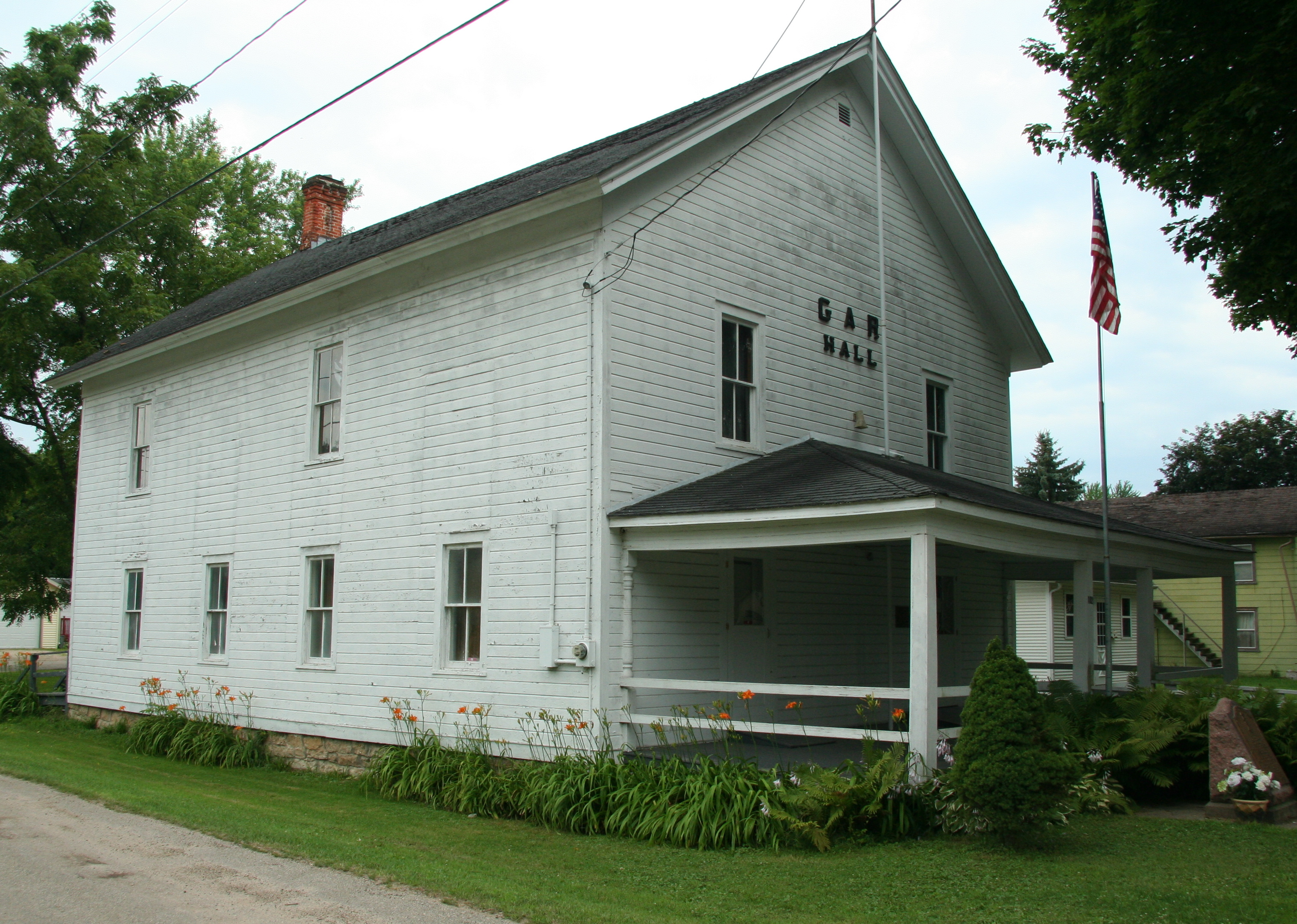
- Boscobel Grand Army of the Republic Hall
- Location: 102 Mary St. Boscobel, Wisconsin
- Coordinates: 43.1318°N 90.70658°W
- NRHP reference No.: 07001329
- Added to NRHP: December 27, 2007

The Boscobel Grand Army of the Republic Hall is located in Boscobel, Wisconsin. It was added to the National Register of Historic Places in 2007. Additionally, it is listed on the Wisconsin State Register of Historic Places.

== History ==
A local Baptist congregation built the building in 1871 as the First Baptist Church, with the interior an open 2-story nave. But the congregation left the building vacant in 1879. A few pews and the organ remain from that first incarnation as a church.

In 1896 the building was bought by the Grand Army of the Republic's local chapter, John McDermott Post #101 and Women's Relief Corps #32. They remodeled the building, splitting the nave into two floors, with a kitchen and other rooms on the first floor and with a meeting hall on the second floor – the current layout. The hall remained a meeting place for the G.A.R. until 1942. The site is now a museum.
