= The Gideons International =

Evangelical Christian organization

- Formation: July 1, 1899; 127 years ago
- Founder: Samuel E. Hill; John H. Nicholson; William J. Knights
- Tax ID no.: 36-2270051
- Location: P.O. Box 140800, Nashville, TN 37214-0800
- Region served: 200 countries and territories
- Members: 269,500 Gideons and auxiliary members (wives of Gideons)
- Key people: Dan Heighway (Executive Director)
- Website: gideons.org

The Gideons International is an evangelical Christian association for men founded in 1899 in Janesville, Wisconsin, whose primary activity is distributing free copies of the Bible worldwide. It distributes complete Bibles or portions thereof in over 100 languages, most widely known in lodging rooms, in addition to medical facilities, schools, military bases, jails and prisons. The association takes its name from the Biblical figure Gideon depicted in Judges 6.

In 1908, the Gideons began distributing free Bibles. The first Bibles were placed in rooms of the Superior Hotel in Superior, Montana. Members of The Gideons International currently average distribution of over 70 million Bibles annually. On average, more than two copies of the Bible are distributed per second through Gideons International. As of April 2015, Gideons International has distributed over 2.5 billion Bibles.

The headquarters of Gideons International is in Nashville, Tennessee.

== History ==
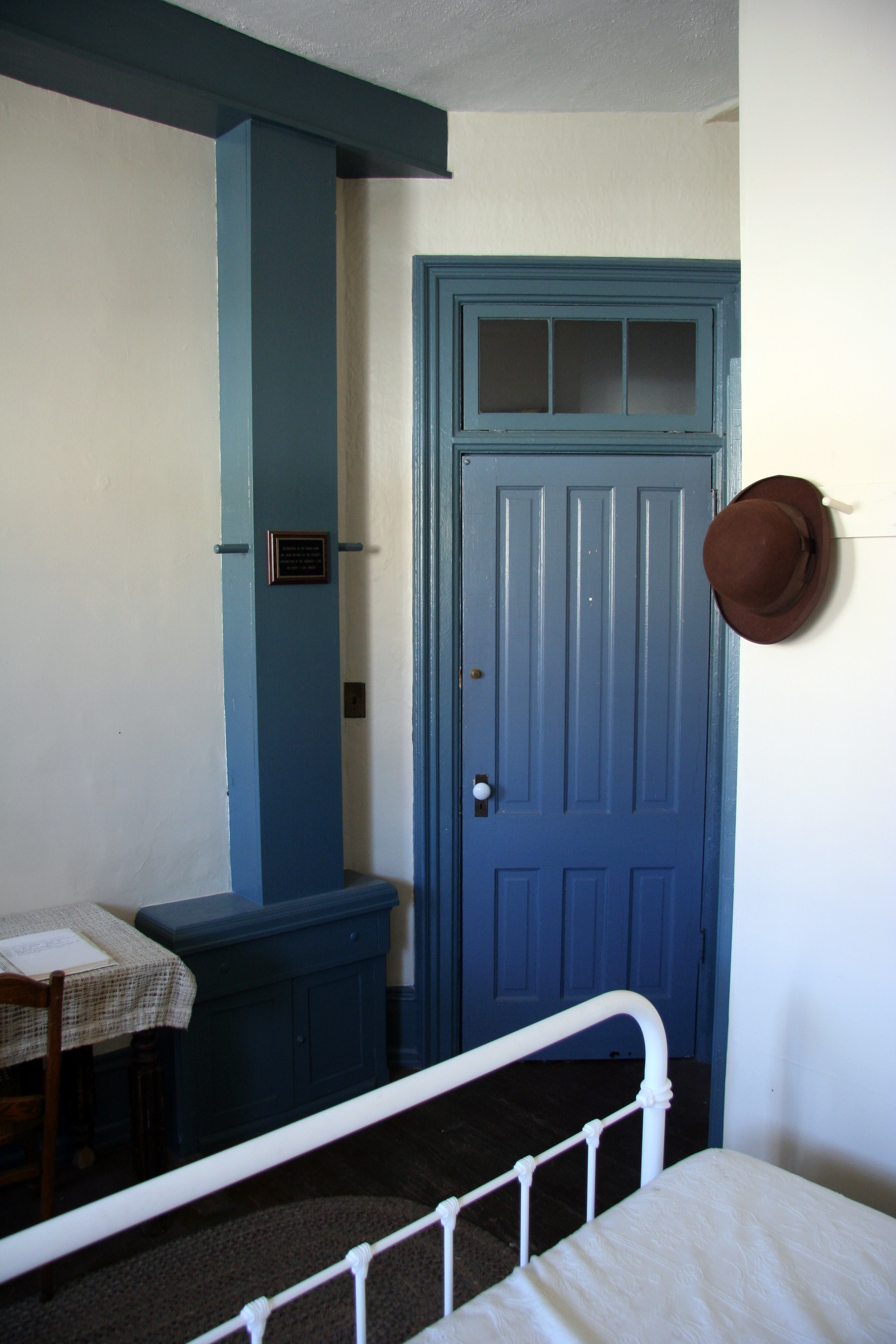
The interior of Room 19, Central House Hotel, Boscobel, Wisconsin, kept in the style it was in 1898 when the founders of the Gideons met there

The organization began in the fall of 1898, when two traveling salesmen, John H. Nicholson of Janesville, Wisconsin, and Samuel E. Hill of Beloit, Wisconsin, met in a hotel room they shared at the Central House Hotel in Boscobel, Wisconsin, and discussed the formation of an association. In May 1899, the two met again in Beaver Dam, Wisconsin, where they decided the goal of their association would be to unite traveling salesmen for evangelism. In July 1899, Nicholson, Hill, and Will J. Knights met at the YMCA in Janesville. Two of them continued with the distribution of the Bibles. Gideons began distributing free Bibles, the work they are most known for, in 1908, when the first Bibles were placed in the rooms of the Superior Hotel in Superior, Montana.

The organization describes its connection to the story of Gideon:

"Gideon was a man who was willing to do exactly what God wanted him to do, regardless of his own judgment as to the plans or results. Humility, faith, and obedience were his great elements of character. This is the standard that The Gideons International is trying to establish in all its members, each man to be ready to do God's will at any time, at any place, and in any way that the Holy Spirit leads."

In keeping with this symbolism, the symbol of the Gideons is a two-handled pitcher and torch recalling Gideon's victory over the Midianites as described in Judges 7.

== Membership ==
As of 2025, The Gideons reported having 269,500 members in 190 countries and territories.

Membership in The Gideons International is generally constituted of current or retired business or professional men (except clergy) aged 21 or older who are members in good standing of an evangelical or Protestant church and adhere to the core spiritual beliefs of the organization. Women may not join, but Wives of Gideons may similarly join the Auxiliary of The Gideons International.

== Programs ==
In addition to their well-known hotel room Bibles, members of The Gideons International also distribute Bibles to members of the military of various countries, to hospitals, nursing homes, prisons and students.

== Testaments distributed ==
A typical Bible or New Testament from The Gideons International contains:

- a short preface;
- a pamphlet suggesting Bible verses that may be of assistance in various sorts of trouble;
- translations of John 3:16 into a variety of languages and scripts;
- the Bible text itself, without notes, references, or any other reference matter other than chapter and verse headings; this can either be the full Bible (typical of the copies placed in hotel rooms), or just the New Testament, Psalms, and Proverbs (typical of the copies handed out as gifts to individuals);
- a short description of the evangelical understanding of salvation, with biblical quotations, and a place for the reader to sign and date their confession of Jesus as their savior (this is especially common in the shorter editions featuring the New Testament, Psalms, and Proverbs).

In English, Gideons typically uses a lightly modified English Standard Version of the Bible, which replaced their prior use of the New King James Version.

=== Colors of Testaments distributed ===
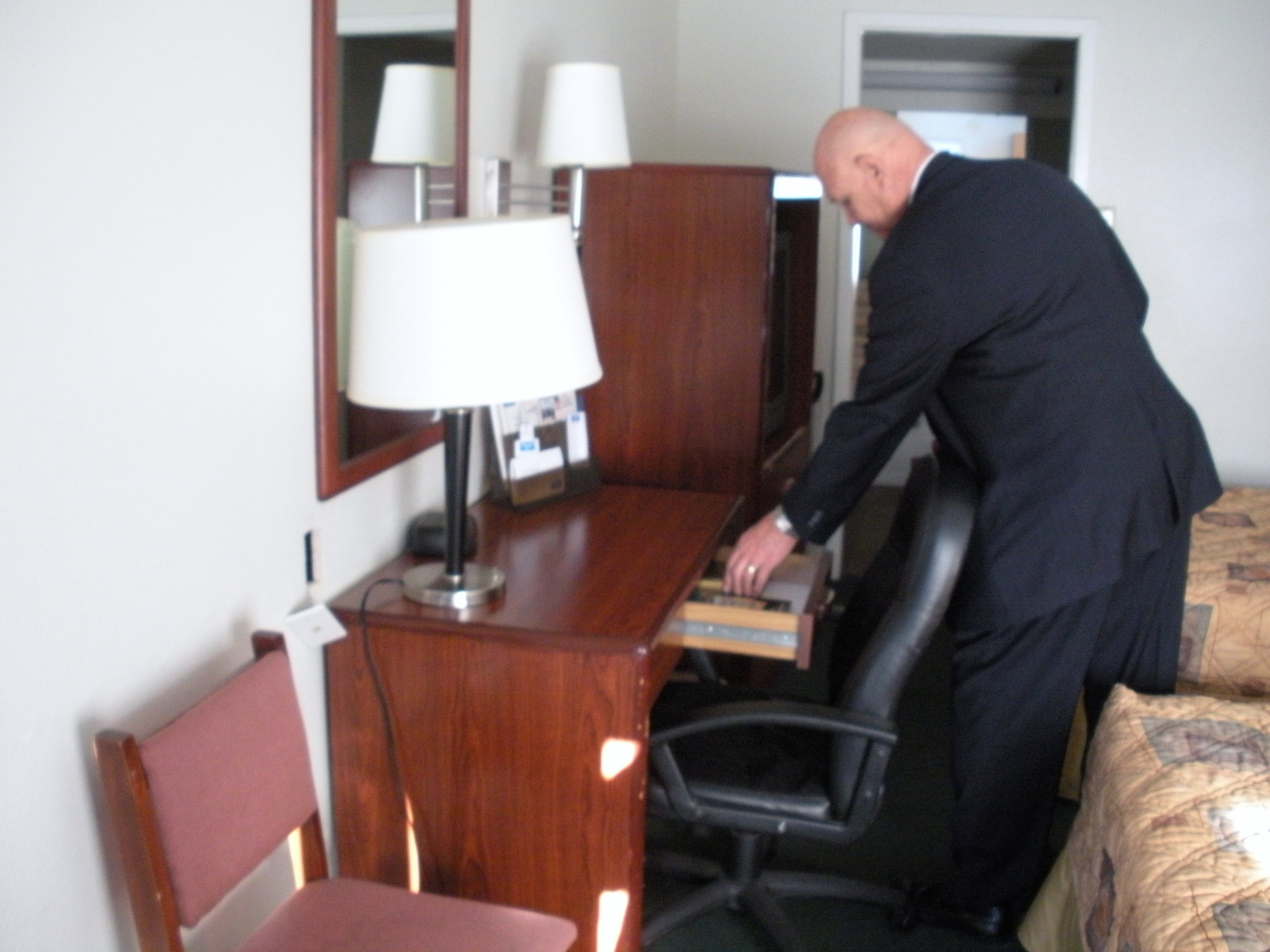
A Gideon member placing a Bible in a motel room

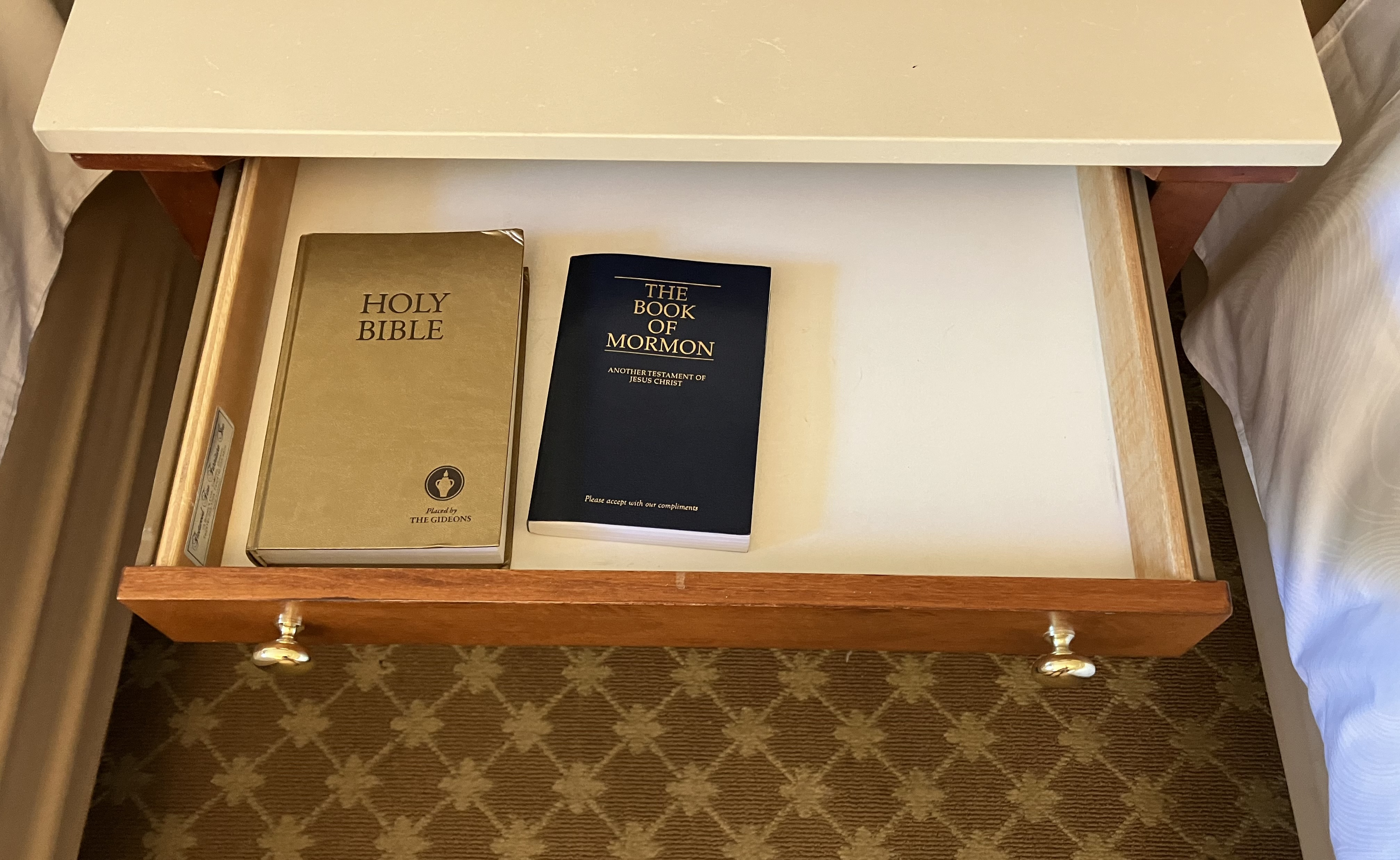
Gideon's Bible beside a Book of Mormon in a JW Marriott Hotel found in Las Vegas, Nevada

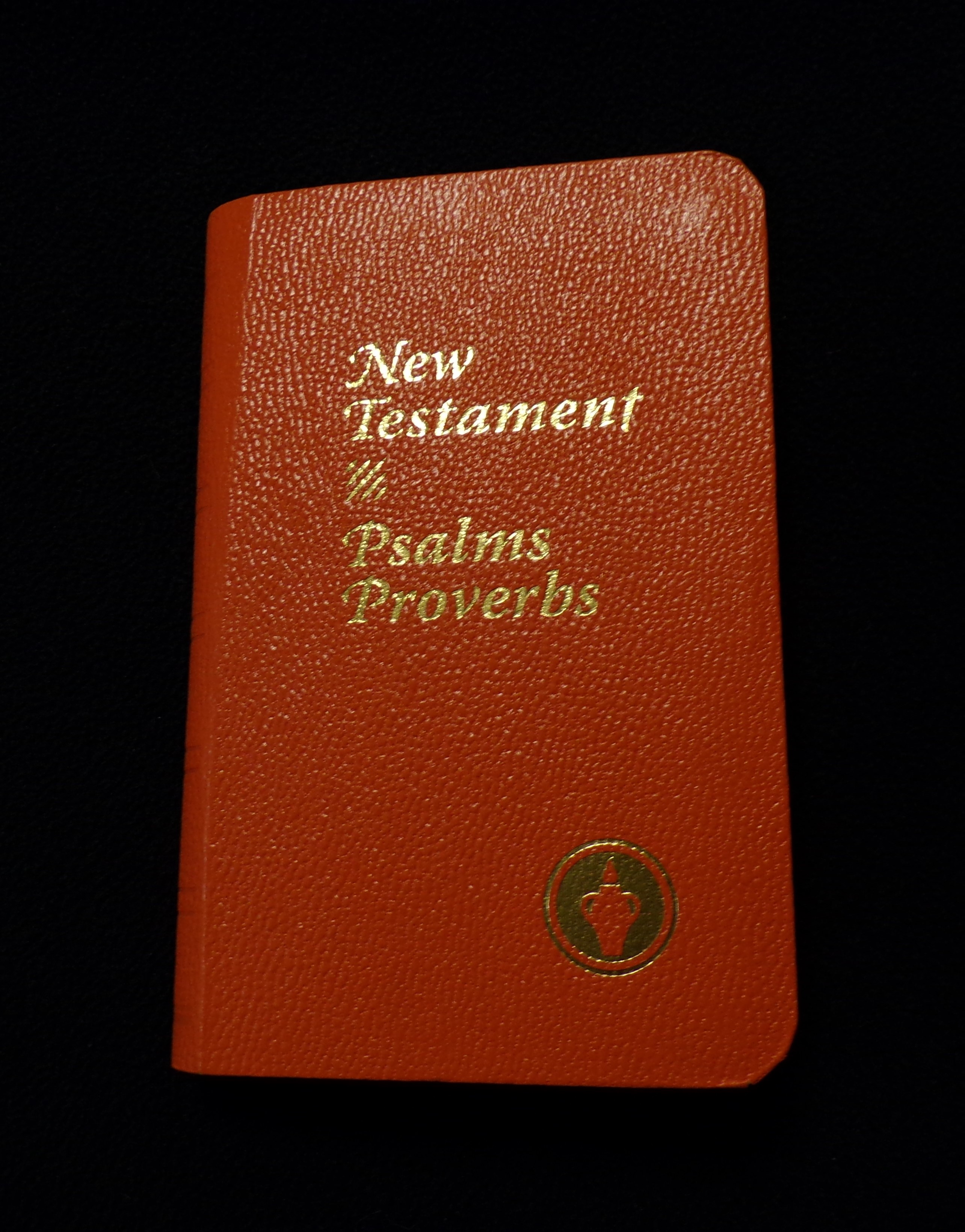
New Testament with an orange cover handed out to the general public by the Gideons International

The covers of the New Testaments distributed by Gideons are color-coded based on which groups they are intended for:

- Orange: given in sidewalk distribution
- Green: for college/university students
- Red: for in-school distribution to middle/high school students
- Digital camouflage/desert camouflage: for the military
- Dark blue: printed in a language other than English, some also went to county jails
- White: for medical professionals
- Light blue: for distribution by the Auxiliary only
- Brown: for jail and prison facilities
- Burgundy: personal worker's testaments (for individual witnessing by Gideons)
- Periwinkle: personal worker's testaments (for individual witnessing by the Auxiliary)
- Gray: "Friends Testaments" (for individual witnessing by Friends of Gideons; these do not include the Gideon emblem on the cover in order to distinguish them from Testaments shared by members of The Gideons.)

During World War II there were military-issued New Testaments, brown for Army and blue for Navy, distributed by the Gideons. In addition to desert camouflage and digital camouflage, there are also woodland camouflage editions for the military.

== Distribution of Bibles on public school grounds ==
The distribution of Bibles on public school grounds has been an issue because of the U.S. Supreme Court's interpretation of the Establishment Clause in the Constitution. Five Supreme Court cases discuss this issue: Everson, McCollum, Zorach, Engel, and Schempp.

In 2008, Americans United for Separation of Church and State brought suit against the South Iron R-1 School District in Missouri for allowing the Gideons to distribute Bibles during class time. In 2009, the 8th U.S. Circuit Court of Appeals in St. Louis upheld a lower court ruling that found the South Iron district's distribution of Bibles to the schoolchildren in their classrooms was unconstitutional. An "attorney representing the South Iron School District in Annapolis, Mo., said the decision allows a new policy to finally be implemented, one that allows any group to hand out literature at the rural district, including information on how children can obtain Bibles."

The Gideons International continues to contact youth in the United States through The Life Book, coordinating with churches and their youth to distribute copies of the Bible in high schools. The Alliance Defending Freedom, as of 2013, maintains that there are "constitutionally permissible ways in which Gideons Bibles may be distributed," and attorneys Rory Gray and Jeremy Tedesco write that the Alliance Defending Freedom sent letters to 174 school districts in Kentucky stating: "Federal caselaw overwhelmingly supports the decision to grant religious and non-religious community groups an equal opportunity to provide literature to willing students." In early 2014, the "Gideons International again distributed Bibles at a public elementary school in Kentucky."

== See also ==
- Pocket Testament League
