= John J. Ruka =

American politician

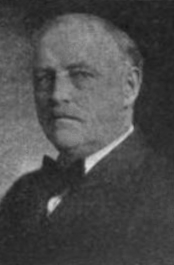

Member of the Wisconsin State Assembly
- In office 1917, 1919

Personal details
- Born: May 30, 1862 Boscobel, Wisconsin, US
- Died: December 19, 1928 (aged 66) Boscobel, Wisconsin, US
- Party: Republican
- Occupation: Manufacturer, farmer

John J. Ruka (May 30, 1862 – December 19, 1928) was a member of the Wisconsin State Assembly.

== Biography ==
Ruka was born on May 30, 1862, in Boscobel, Wisconsin. He married Martha Fox. By trade, he was a manufacturer and a farmer. Ruka died at his home in Boscobel on December 19, 1928.

== Political career ==
Ruka was elected to the Assembly in 1916 and 1918. In addition, he was a member of the city council and school board of Boscobel. He was a Republican.
