= Central House Hotel =

- U.S. National Register of Historic Places
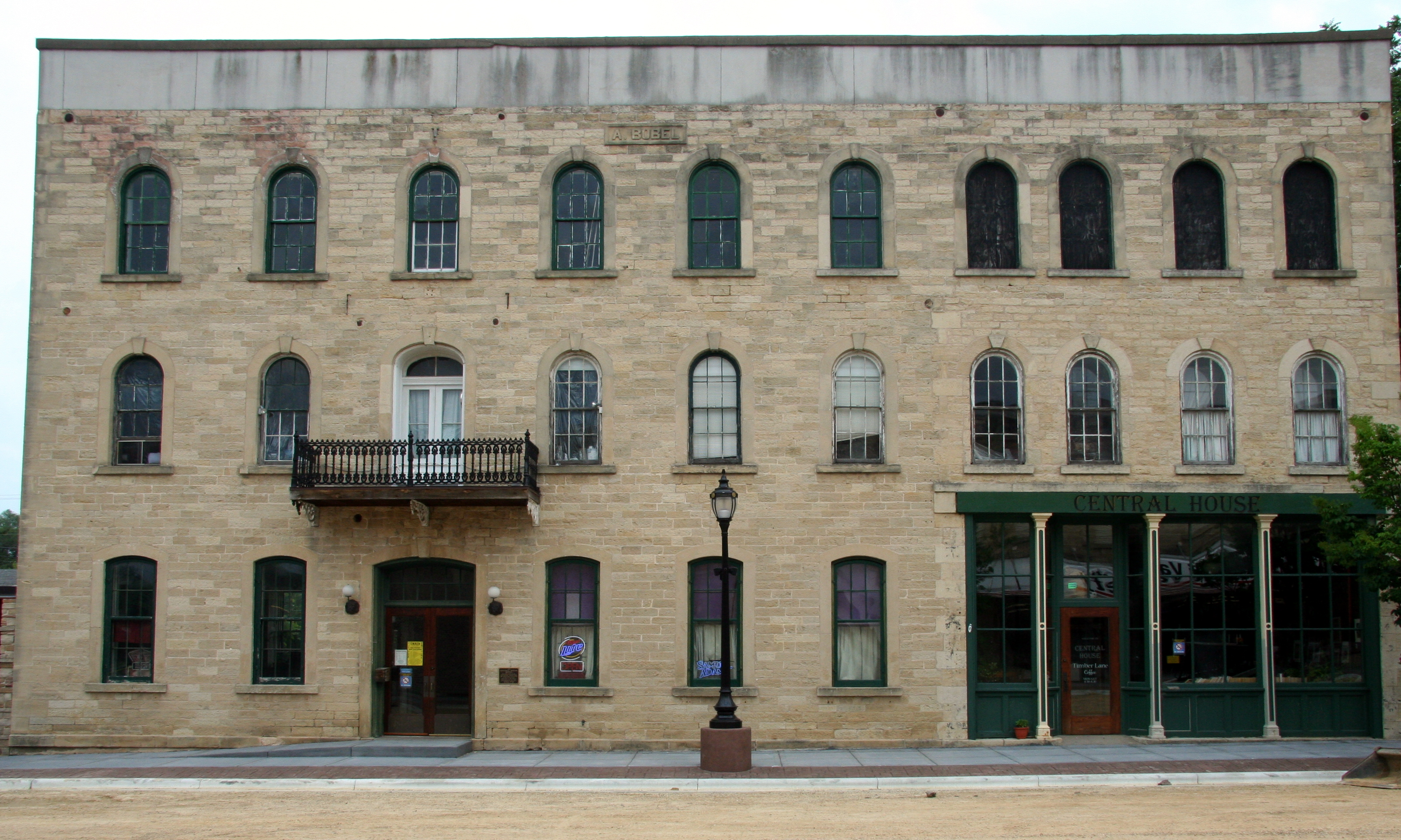
- Central House Hotel
- Location: 1005 Wisconsin Ave. Boscobel, Wisconsin
- Coordinates: 43.13448°N 90.70555°W
- Architectural style: Italianate
- NRHP reference No.: 96001361
- Added to NRHP: November 27, 1996

The Central House Hotel is an Italianate hotel located in Boscobel, Wisconsin. It was added to the National Register of Historic Places in 1996.

== History ==
The hotel was built by Adam Bobel, a Prussian immigrant who had served with the 20th Wisconsin Volunteer Infantry Regiment during the American Civil War. After a fire in 1881, the building was largely re-built. In 1898, the hotel was overly crowded due to a lumberman's convention. Two salesmen, John H. Nicholson of Janesville, Wisconsin and Samuel E. Hill of Beloit, Wisconsin, were sharing a room since no single rooms were available. During their stay, the men began to talk about their Christian faith. They would discuss the need for an organization that would provide mutual help and recognition for Christian travelers. In 1899, the two men, along with William J. Knights of Janesville, met again and founded Gideons International. Though the first official meeting took place in Janesville, the organization has always identified the Central House Hotel in Boscobel as the place of its founding.
