= Boscobel Airport =

Boscobel Airport Boscobel Municipal Airport
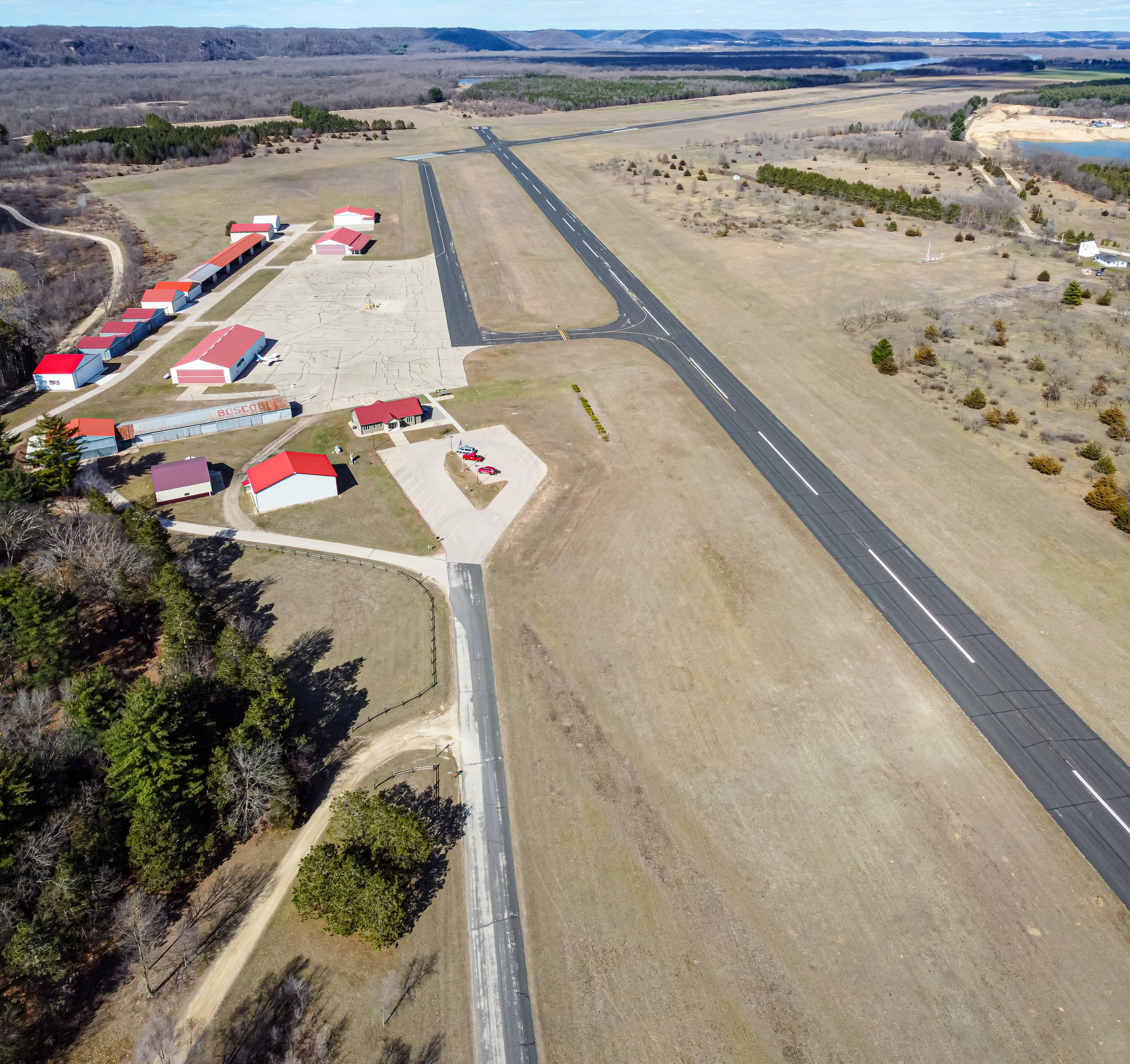
- IATA: none; ICAO: KOVS; FAA LID: OVS

Summary
- Airport type: Public
- Owner: City of Boscobel
- Serves: Boscobel, Wisconsin
- Opened: January 1947
- Time zone: CST (UTC−06:00)
  - Summer (DST): CDT (UTC−05:00)
- Elevation AMSL: 673 ft (205 m)
- Coordinates: 43°09′39″N 090°40′26″W
- Website: BoscobelWisconsin.com/...

Map
- Location of airport in Wisconsin OVS (the United States)

Runways
Direction	Length		Surface
Direction	ft	m	Surface
7/25	5,000	1,524	Asphalt
2/20	3,656	1,114	Asphalt

Statistics
- Aircraft operations (2023): 12,400
- Based aircraft (2024): 25
- Source: Federal Aviation Administration

Boscobel Airport (ICAO: KOVS, FAA LID: OVS), also known as Boscobel Municipal Airport, is a city owned public use airport located two nautical miles (4 km) northeast of the central business district of Boscobel, a city in Grant County, Wisconsin, United States.

It is included in the Federal Aviation Administration (FAA) National Plan of Integrated Airport Systems for 2025–2029, in which it is categorized as a local general aviation facility.

Although most U.S. airports use the same three-letter location identifier for the FAA and IATA, this airport is assigned OVS by the FAA but has no designation from the IATA.

== Facilities and aircraft ==
Boscobel Airport covers an area of 382 acres (155 ha) at an elevation of 673 feet (205 m) above mean sea level. It has two asphalt paved runways: the primary runway 7/25 measuring 5,000 by 75 feet (1,524 by 23 m) and the crosswind runway 2/20 measuring 3,656 by 58 ft (1,114 by 18 m).

For the 12-month period ending July 19, 2023, the airport had 12,400 aircraft operations, an average of 34 per day: 97% general aviation, 2% air taxi and 1% military. In August 2024, there were 25 aircraft based at this airport: 23 single-engine and 2 multi-engine.

== See also ==
- List of airports in Wisconsin
