= Boscobel (town), Wisconsin =

Boscobel, Wisconsin
- Town
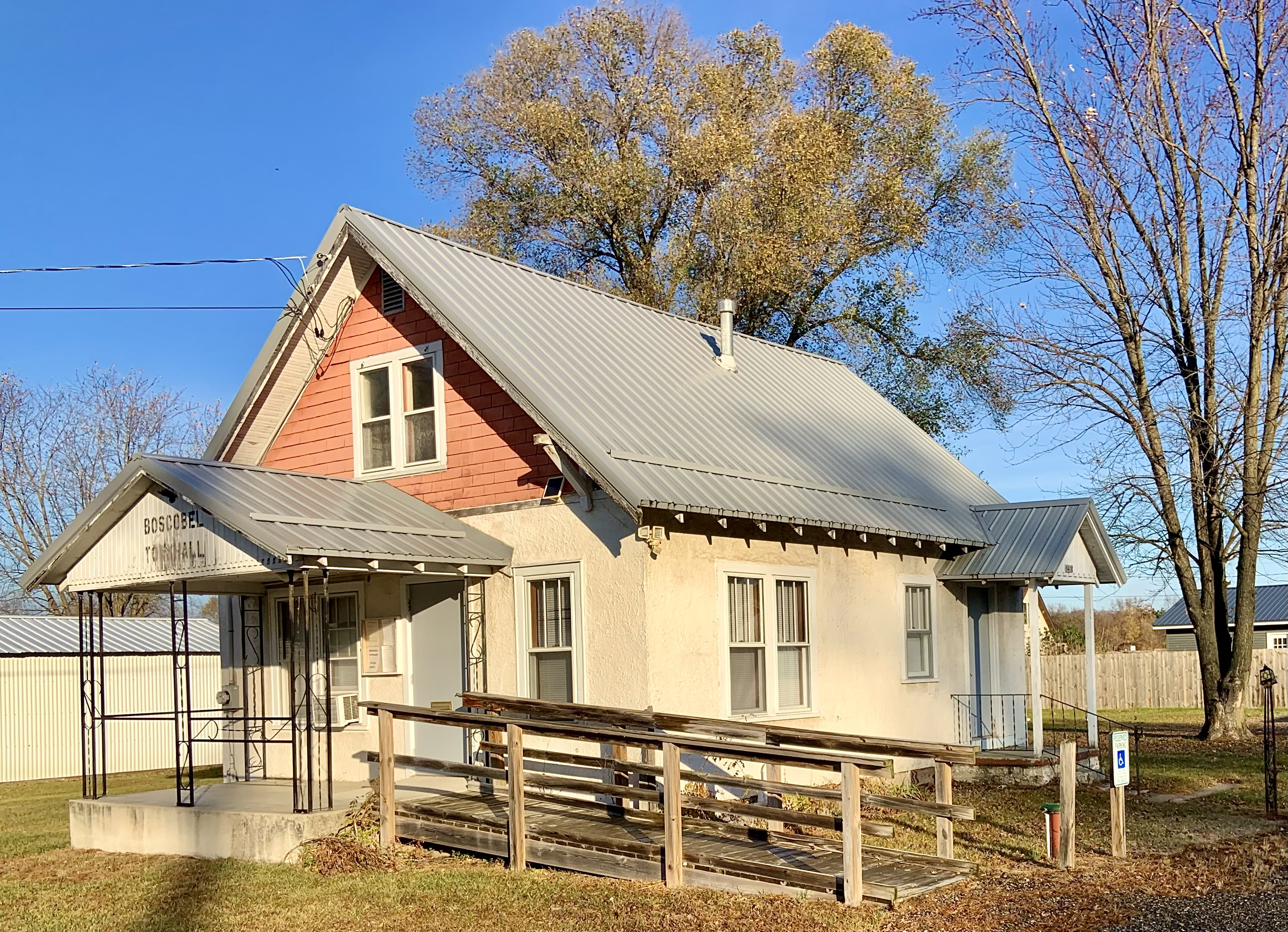
- Town hall

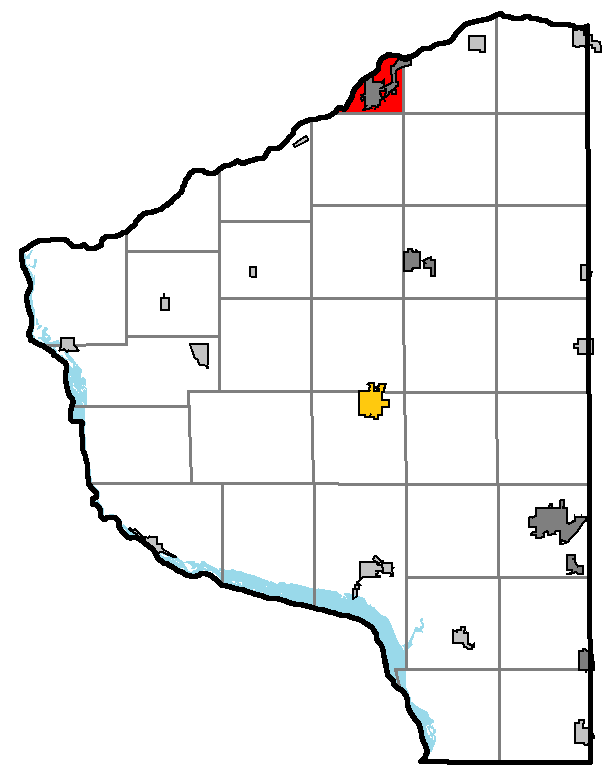
- Location of Boscobel, within Grant County, Wisconsin

- Location of Grant County, within Wisconsin
- Coordinates: 43°8′17″N 90°41′41″W
- Country: United States
- State: Wisconsin
- County: Grant

Area
  - Total: 7.3 sq mi (18.9 km^{2})
  - Land: 6.8 sq mi (17.7 km^{2})
  - Water: 0.46 sq mi (1.2 km^{2})
- Elevation: 673 ft (205 m)

Population (2020)
  - Total: 379
  - Density: 55.5/sq mi (21.4/km^{2})
- Time zone: UTC-6 (Central (CST))
  - Summer (DST): UTC-5 (CDT)
- Area code: 608
- FIPS code: 55-08875
- GNIS feature ID: 1582844
- Website: https://townofboscobel.com/

Boscobel is a town in Grant County, Wisconsin, United States. The population was 379 at the 2020 census. The town borders the city of Boscobel.

== Geography ==
According to the United States Census Bureau, the town has a total area of 7.3 square miles (18.9 km^{2}), of which 6.8 square miles (17.7 km^{2}) is land and 0.5 square mile (1.2 km^{2}) (6.44%) is water.

== Demographics ==
As of the 2000 census, there were 433 people, 190 households, and 124 families living in the town. The population density was 63.4 people per square mile (24.5/km^{2}). There were 199 housing units at an average density of 29.1 per square mile (11.2/km^{2}). The racial makeup of the town was 99.31% White, and 0.69% from two or more races. 0.23% of the population were Hispanic or Latino of any race. Of the 190 households 22.1% had children under the age of 18 living with them, 57.9% were married couples living together, 2.6% had a female householder with no husband present, and 34.7% were non-families. 31.6% of households were one person and 15.8% were one person aged 65 or older. The average household size was 2.28 and the average family size was 2.80.

The age distribution was 19.9% under the age of 18, 7.2% from 18 to 24, 23.8% from 25 to 44, 29.8% from 45 to 64, and 19.4% 65 or older. The median age was 44 years. For every 100 females, there were 105.2 males. For every 100 females age 18 and over, there were 104.1 males.

The median household income was $32,841 and the median family income was $39,250. Males had a median income of $30,417 versus $21,875 for females. The per capita income for the town was $18,964. About 3.2% of families and 8.1% of the population were below the poverty line, including none of those under age 18 and 7.8% of those age 65 or over.
