= Boscobel, Wisconsin =

- City
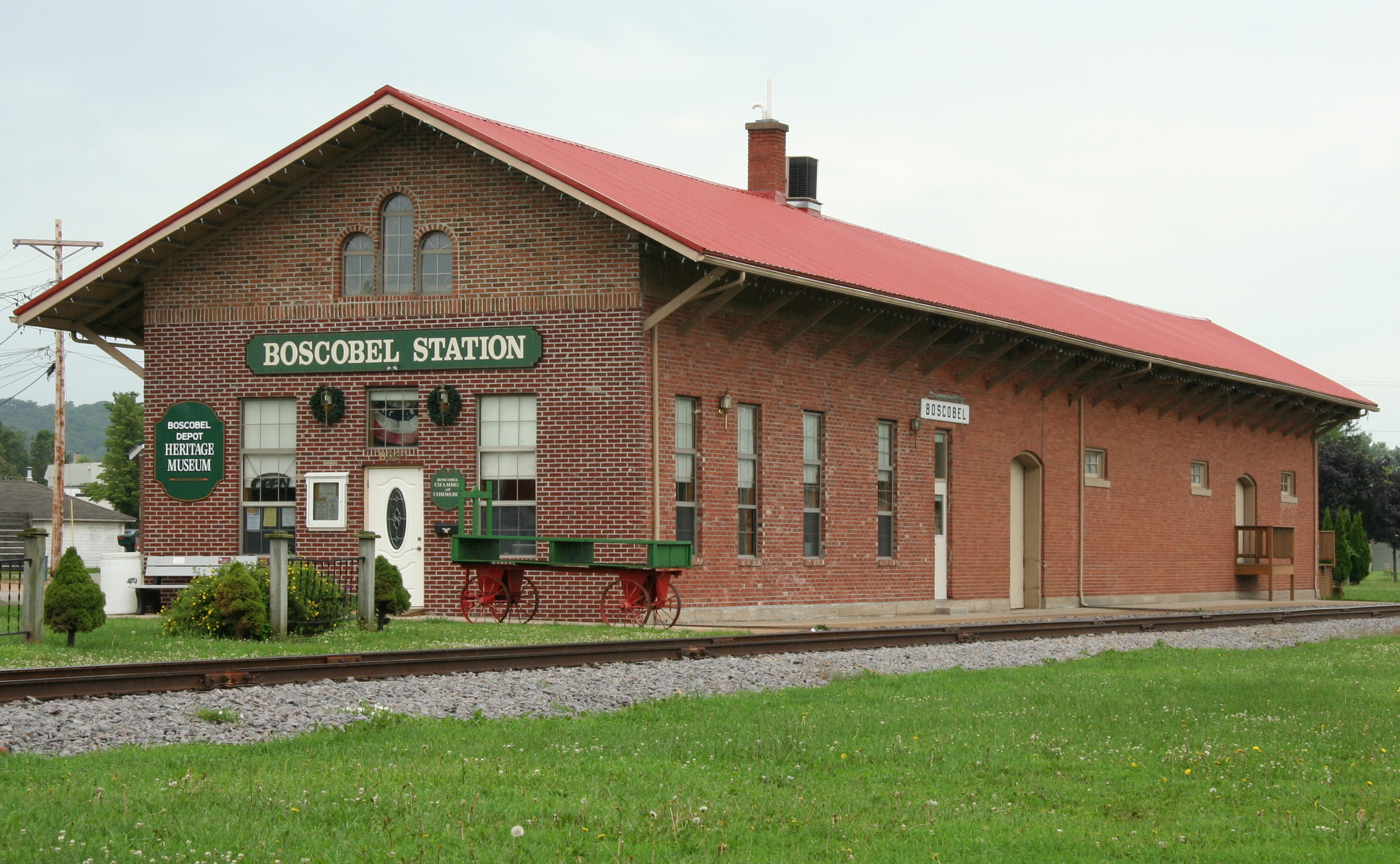
- The historic Boscobel Train Station in the center of the city

- Location of Boscobel in Grant County, Wisconsin.

- Location within Wisconsin Location within the United States
- Coordinates: 43°8′11″N 90°42′15″W
- Country: United States
- State: Wisconsin
- County: Grant

Area
  - Total: 3.22 sq mi (8.33 km^{2})
  - Land: 3.22 sq mi (8.33 km^{2})
  - Water: 0.0039 sq mi (0.01 km^{2})

Population (2020)
  - Total: 3,286
  - Density: 1,022/sq mi (394.6/km^{2})
- Time zone: UTC-6 (Central (CST))
  - Summer (DST): UTC-5 (CDT)
- ZIP code: 53805
- Area code: 608
- FIPS code: 55-08850
- Website: boscobelwisconsin.com

Boscobel (/ˈbɒskoʊbɛl/ BOSS-koh-bel) is a city in Grant County, Wisconsin, United States. The population was 3,286 at the 2020 census. Approximately 0.6 mi. (1 km) to the north of the city, across a riparian swamp, is the Wisconsin River. U.S. Route 61 crosses the Wisconsin River at Boscobel. To the south, the city is bordered by the Town of Boscobel.

Boscobel was the site of a stop along the now defunct Milwaukee Road, and it is still served by the Wisconsin and Southern Railroad. It is also the site of the Wisconsin Secure Program Facility (WSPF), a Wisconsin Department of Corrections prison for men. Businesses include the historic Central House Hotel, the birthplace of Gideons International.

== Geography ==
Boscobel is located at 43°8′11″N 90°42′15″W (43.136473, -90.70418), in the Driftless Zone. According to the United States Census Bureau, the city has a total area of approximately 3.22 square miles (8.34 km^{2}), of which 3.21 square miles (8.31 km^{2}) is land and less than 0.01 square miles (0.03 km^{2}) is water.

On August 7, 2021, the southern edge of Boscobel was hit by what would eventually become the strongest tornado in Wisconsin in more than a decade, reaching EF3 strength just east of the city.

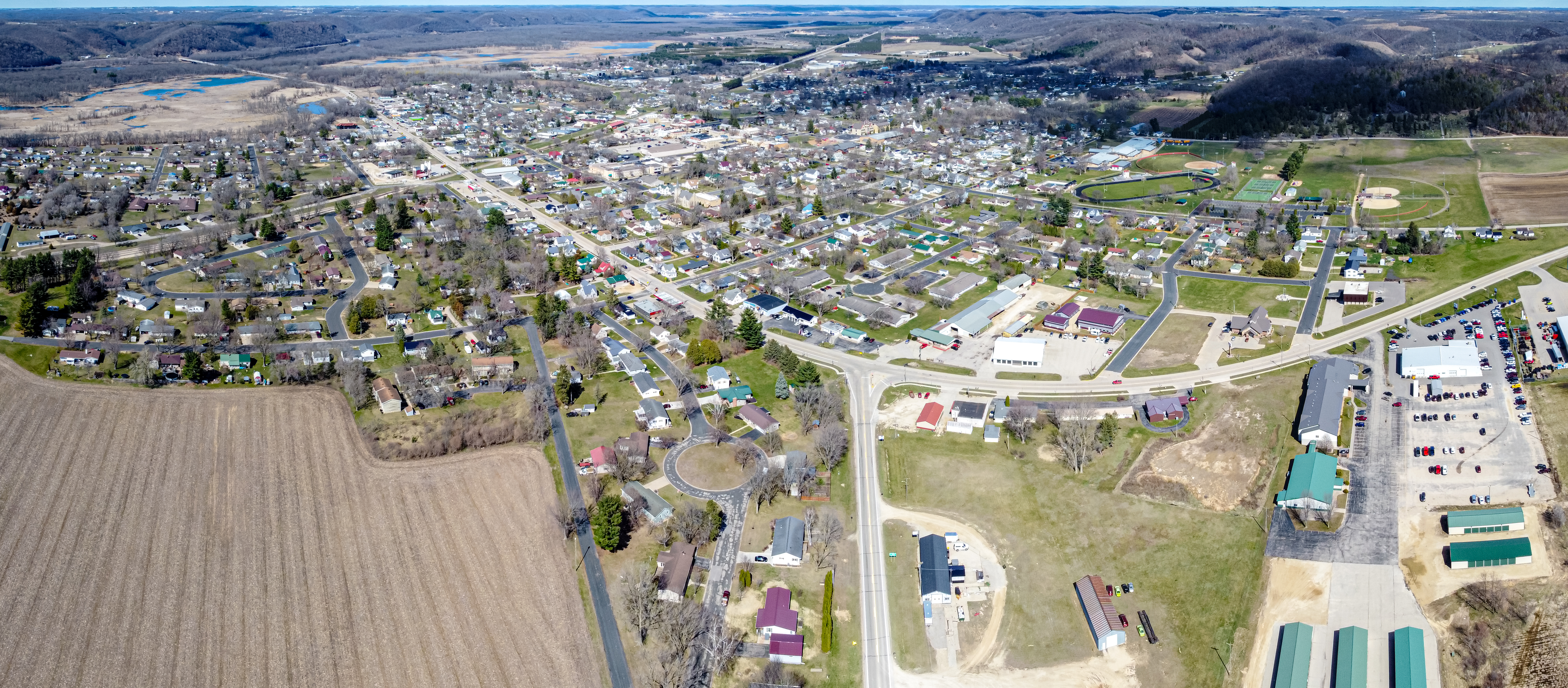

== Demographics ==
Historical population
Census	Pop.	Note	%±
1870	1,509		—
1880	1,428		−5.4%
1890	1,570		9.9%
1900	1,637		4.3%
1910	1,525		−6.8%
1920	1,670		9.5%
1930	1,762		5.5%
1940	2,008		14.0%
1950	2,347		16.9%
1960	2,608		11.1%
1970	2,510		−3.8%
1980	2,662		6.1%
1990	2,706		1.7%
2000	3,047		12.6%
2010	3,231		6.0%
2020	3,286		1.7%
U.S. Decennial Census

=== 2020 census ===
As of the census of 2020, the population was 3,286. The population density was 1,022.1 inhabitants per square mile (394.6/km^{2}). There were 1,317 housing units at an average density of 409.6 per square mile (158.1/km^{2}). The racial makeup of the city was 86.5% White, 8.2% Black or African American, 0.5% Native American, 0.5% Asian, 0.5% from other races, and 3.6% from two or more races. Ethnically, the population was 3.0% Hispanic or Latino of any race.

The 2020 census population of Boscobel included 458 incarcerated people at the Wisconsin Secure Program Facility. This likely impacts the city's demographic and racial profile given that Wisconsin has the nation's highest racial incarceration gap and imprisons Black residents at twelve times the rate of white residents.

=== 2010 census ===
At the 2010 census there were 3,231 people, 1,195 households, and 727 families living in the city. The population density was 1,077.0 inhabitants per square mile (415.8/km^{2}). There were 1,307 housing units at an average density of 435.7 per square mile (168.2/km^{2}). The racial makup of the city was 90.1% White, 8.3% African American, 0.6% Native American, 0.2% Asian, 0.1% Pacific Islander, and 0.8% from two or more races. Hispanic or Latino of any race were 2.2%.

Of the 1,195 households 30.0% had children under the age of 18 living with them, 42.8% were married couples living together, 12.0% had a female householder with no husband present, 6.1% had a male householder with no wife present, and 39.2% were non-families. 32.8% of households were one person and 13.6% were one person aged 65 or older. The average household size was 2.30 and the average family size was 2.90.

The median age was 38.1 years. 21% of residents were under the age of 18; 10% were between the ages of 18 and 24; 28.9% were from 25 to 44; 26% were from 45 to 64; and 14% were 65 or older. The gender makeup of the city was 54.6% male and 45.4% female.

=== 2000 census ===
At the 2000 census there were 3,047 people, 1,174 households, and 752 families living in the city. The population density was 1,068.6 people per square mile (412.8/km^{2}). There were 1,266 housing units at an average density of 444.0 per square mile (171.5/km^{2}). The racial makup of the city was 94.78% White, 3.74% Black or African American, 0.20% Native American, 0.16% Asian, 0.20% from other races, and 0.92% from two or more races. 1.18% of the population were Hispanic or Latino of any race. Of the 1,174 households 32.3% had children under the age of 18 living with them, 46.3% were married couples living together, 13.7% had a female householder with no husband present, and 35.9% were non-families. 30.2% of households were one person and 16.4% were one person aged 65 or older. The average household size was 2.39 and the average family size was 2.96.

The age distribution was 24.8% under the age of 18, 9.9% from 18 to 24, 29.5% from 25 to 44, 18.1% from 45 to 64, and 17.7% 65 or older. The median age was 36 years. For every 100 females, there were 98.0 males. For every 100 females age 18 and over, there were 95.7 males.

The median household income was $32,698 and the median family income was $37,527. Males had a median income of $24,806 versus $19,617 for females. The per capita income for the city was $15,432. About 6.0% of families and 9.6% of the population were below the poverty line, including 11.4% of those under age 18 and 5.2% of those age 65 or over.

== In popular culture ==
The town was mentioned in the 1999 David Lynch biographical road drama film, The Straight Story when Iowa farmer Lyle Straight (played by Richard Farnsworth) asks a local priest if he knows the whereabouts of Lyle's brother (played by Harry Dean Stanton).

== Notable people ==
- George Barnett, 12th Commandant of the Marine Corps, grew up in Boscobel.
- Thomas P.M. Barnett, military geostrategist, grew up in Boscobel.
- John J. Blaine, a United States senator and Governor of Wisconsin, died and is buried in Boscobel.
- Philip V. Bohlman, ethnomusicologist.
- John Brindley, jurist and legislator, was born on a farm near Boscobel.
- Otey Clark, Boston Red Sox pitcher, was born in Boscobel.
- Benjamin M. Coates, businessman and politician, lived in Boscobel.
- Jefferson Coates, Medal of Honor recipient, lived in Boscobel.
- James O. Davidson, Governor of Wisconsin, lived in Boscobel.
- Samuel Hof, United States Army Major General, Chief of Ordnance from 1930 to 1934., was born in Boscobel.
- DuWayne Johnsrud, Wisconsin legislator
- Helmar Lewis, mayor of Boscobel, Wisconsin State Senator
- Colin Masica, American linguist, lived in Boscobel.
- Bobby G. Rice, country music singer
- Ora R. Rice, Speaker of the Wisconsin State Assembly, was born in Boscobel.
- John J. Ruka, Wisconsin State Representative, was born in Boscobel.
- Ted Snyder, composer, lyricist, and music composer, lived in Boscobel.
- Elaine Szymoniak, former Iowa State Senator, was born in Boscobel.
- Charles E. Tuffley, Wisconsin State Representative, lived in Boscobel.
- Nathan C. Twining, United States Admiral, was born in Boscobel.

== Gallery ==
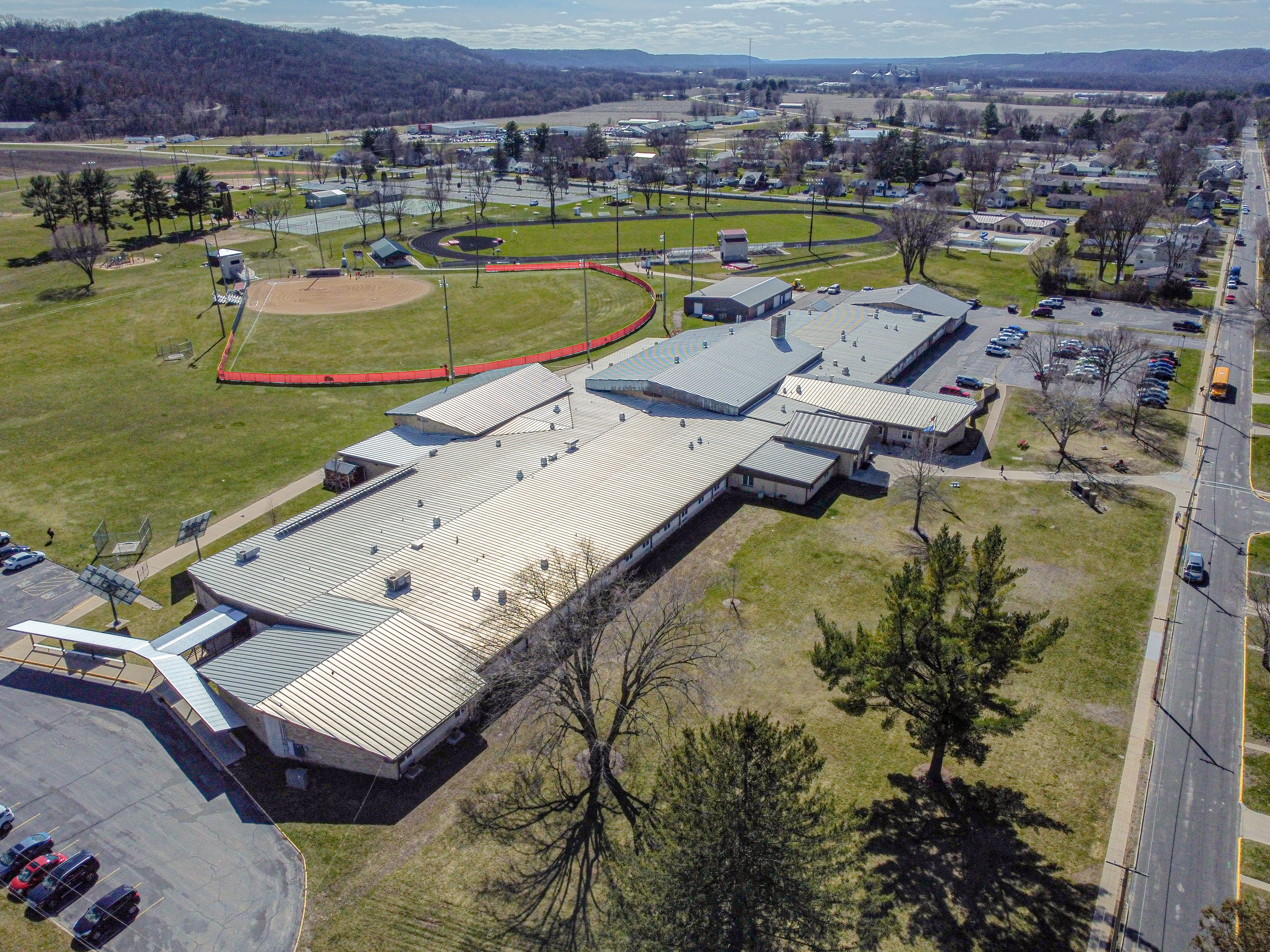
Boscobel High School

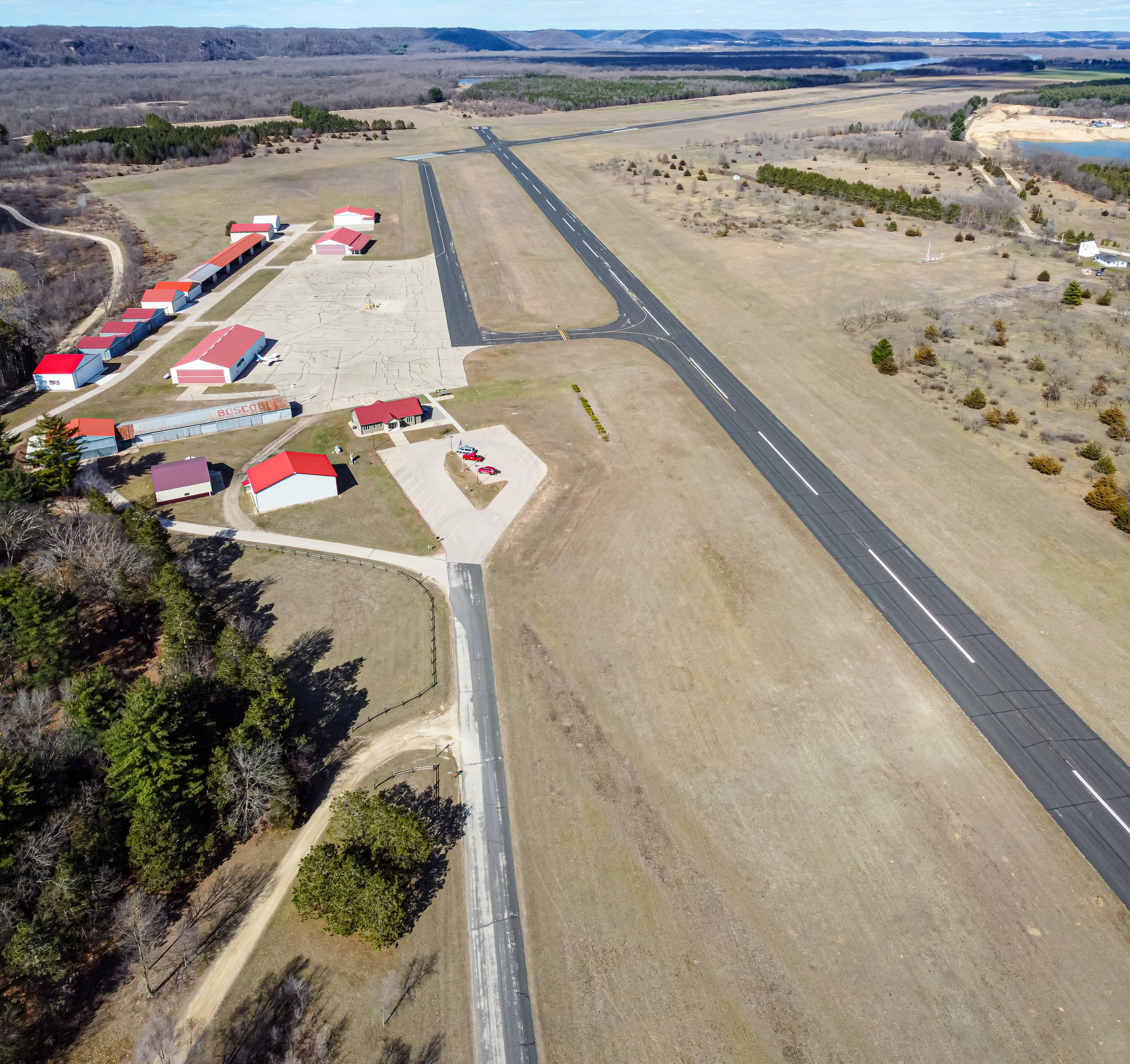
Boscobel Airport

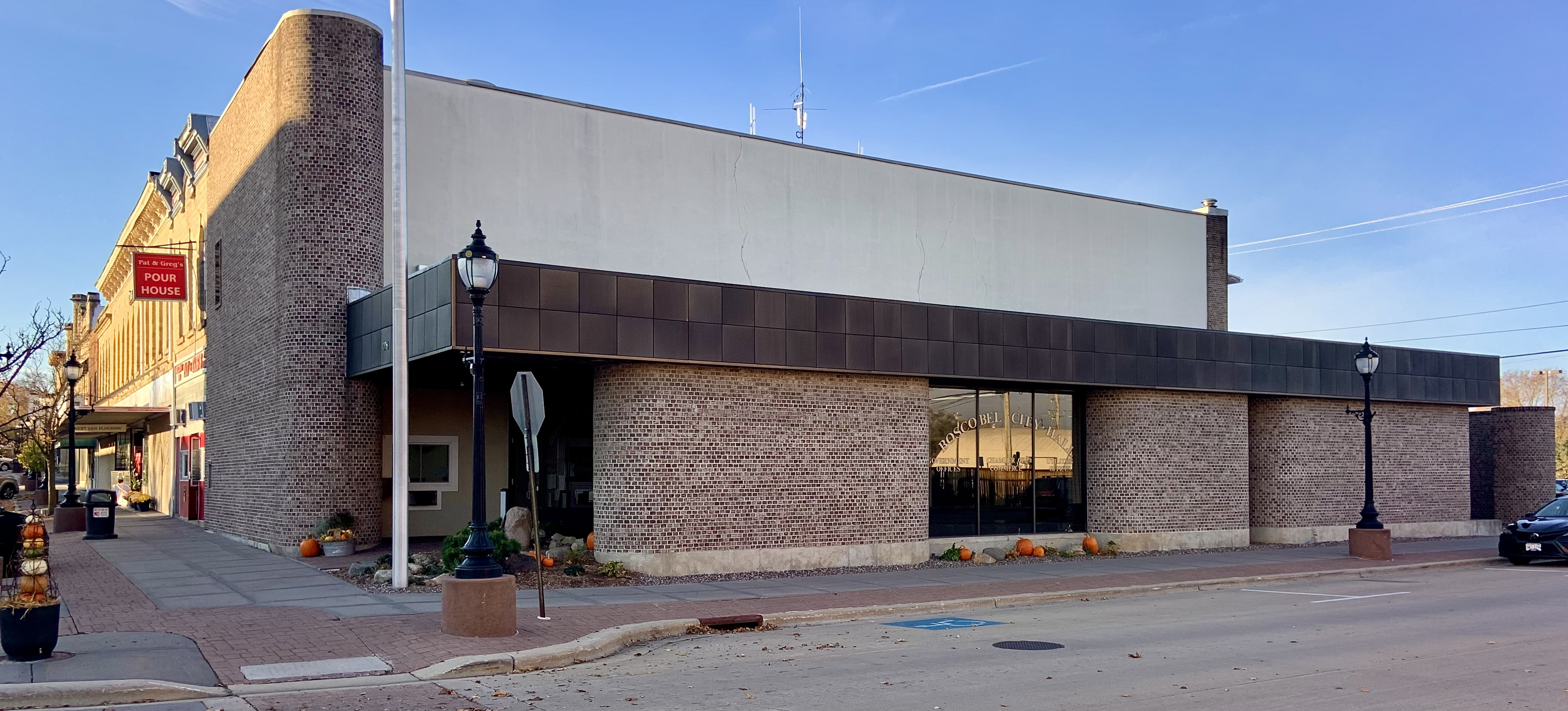
City hall

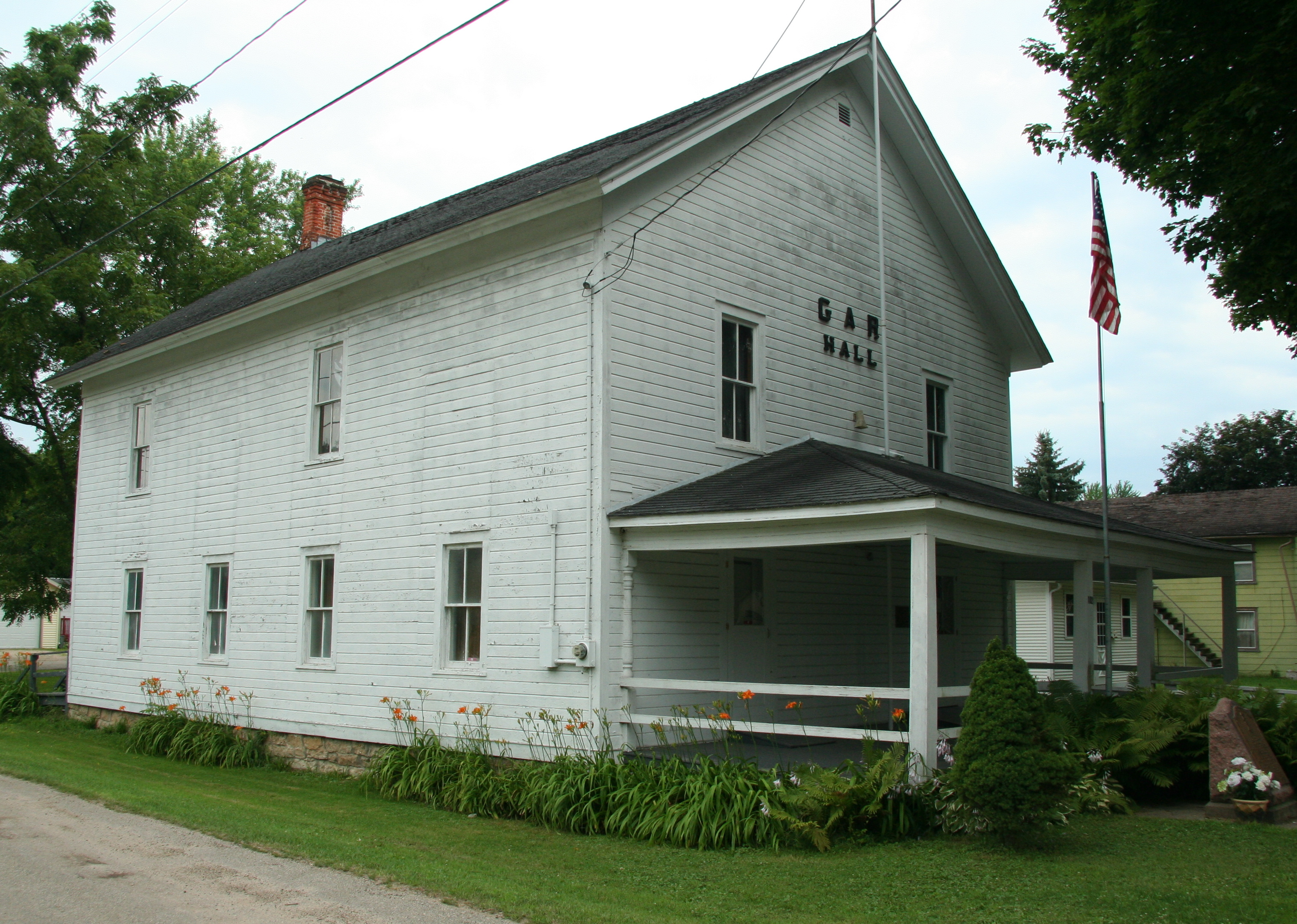
Boscobel Grand Army of the Republic Hall

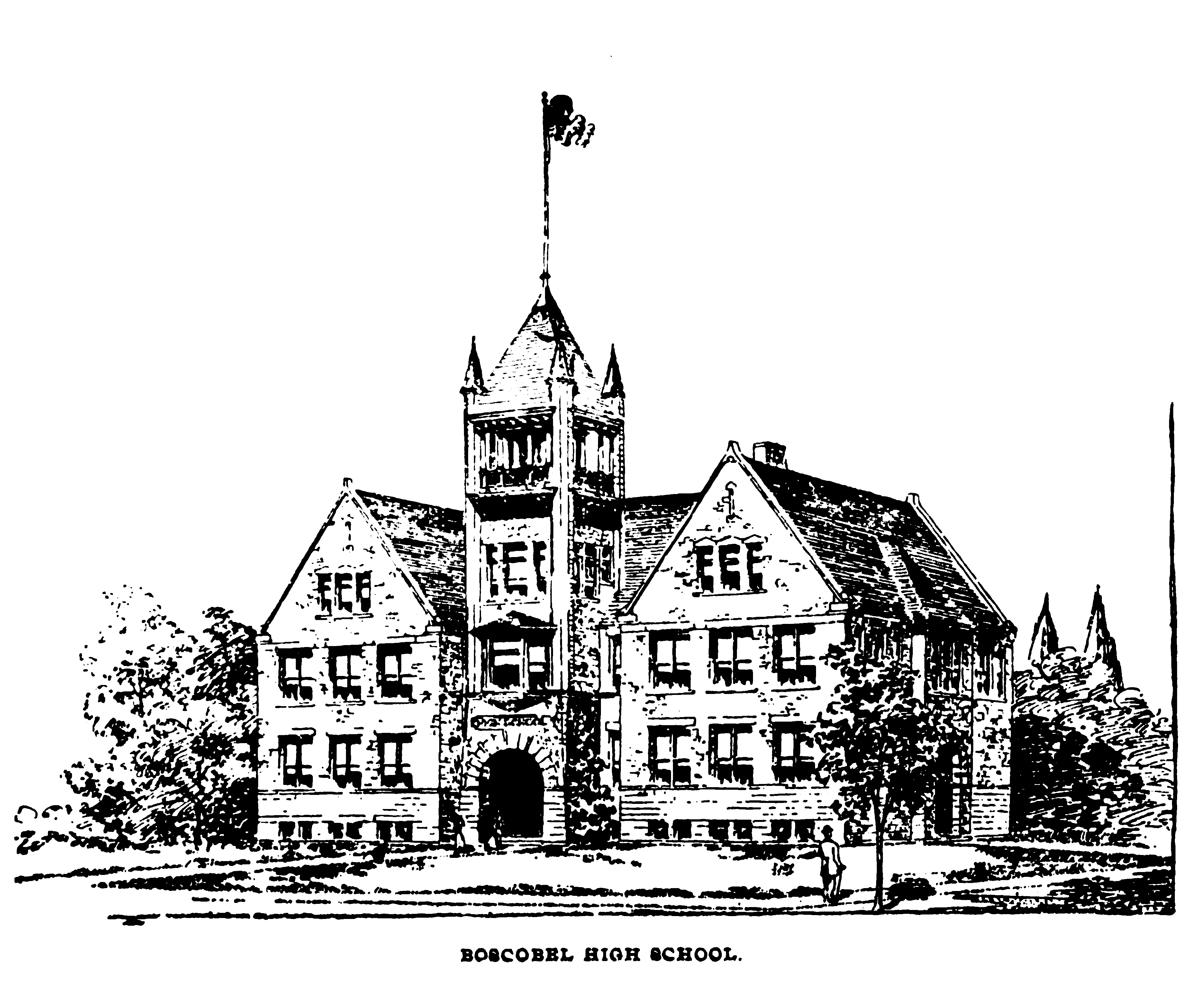
Boscobel High School as of 1900
