= Madison metropolitan area =

- Combined Statistical Area
- Madison–Janesville–Beloit, WI Combined Statistical Area
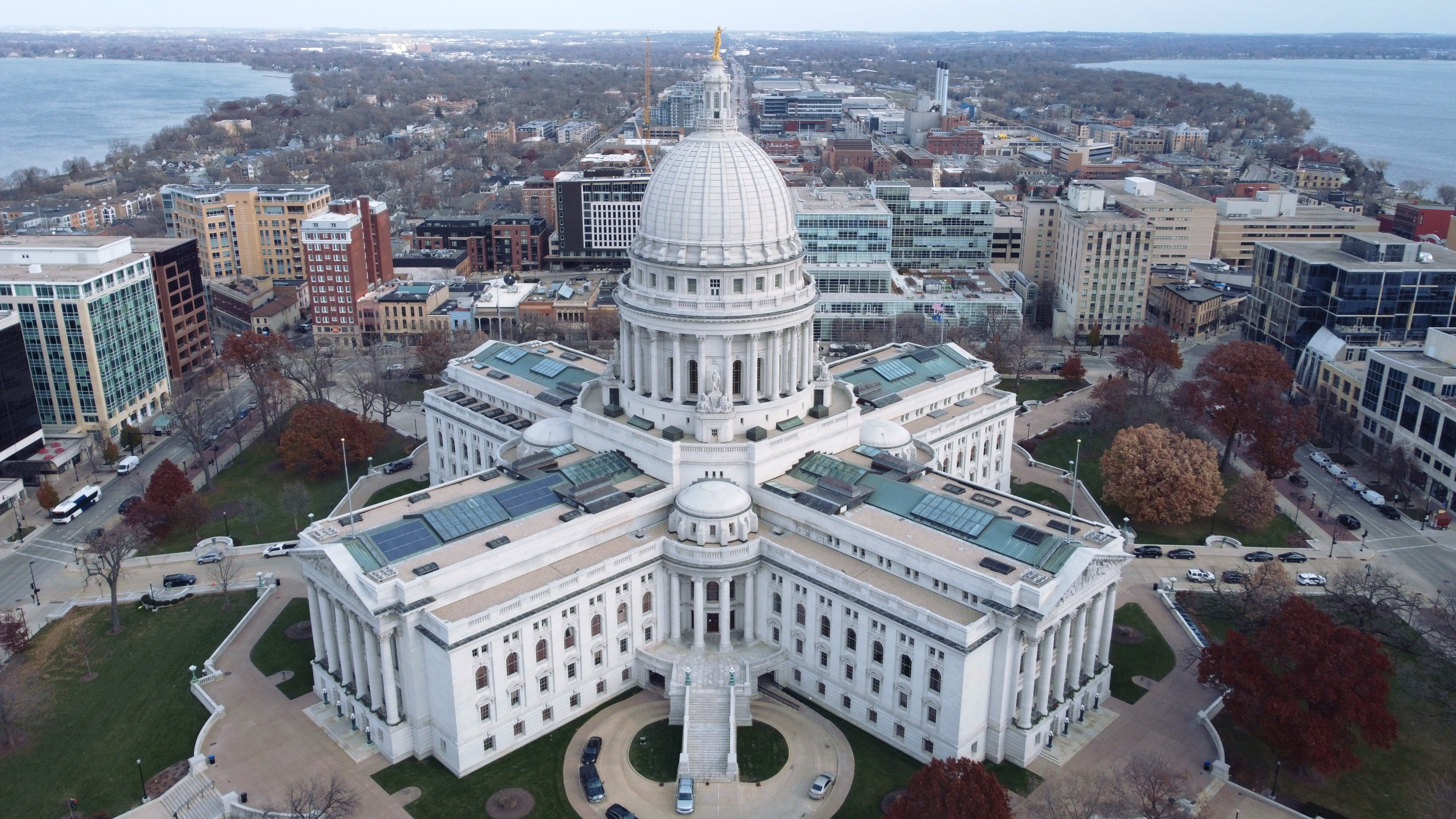
- Wisconsin State Capitol
Map of Madison–Janesville–Beloit, WI CSA
City of Madison
Madison, WI MSA
Janesville–Beloit, WI MSA
Baraboo, WI µSA
- Country: United States
- State: Wisconsin

Area
  - Land: 4,960 sq mi (12,850 km^{2})

Population (2020)
  - Total: 680,804
  - Estimate (2025): 709,685

GDP
  - Total: $60.909 billion (2022)
- Time zone: UTC−6 (CST)
  - Summer (DST): UTC−5 (CDT)

The Madison metropolitan area, also known as Greater Madison, is the metropolitan area surrounding the city of Madison, Wisconsin. The Madison, WI Metropolitan Statistical Area (MSA), as defined by the Office of Management and Budget, consists of Columbia, Dane, Green, and Iowa counties in south-central Wisconsin. As of the 2020 census, the MSA had a population of 680,804, making it the 84th-largest in the United States.

The Madison–Janesville–Beloit, WI Combined Statistical Area (CSA) consists of the four counties in the Madison MSA, as well as Rock County (Janesville–Beloit MSA) and Sauk County (Baraboo µSA). The CSA population as of the 2020 census was 910,246, making it the 64th-largest in the United States.

== Definitions ==
=== Metropolitan Statistical Area ===
The Madison, WI Metropolitan Statistical Area (MSA) is made up of four counties.

County	Seat	2025 estimate	2020 Census	Change	Area	Density
Dane	Madison	590,375	561,504	+5.14%	1,238 sq mi (3,210 km^{2})	477/sq mi (184/km^{2})
Columbia	Portage	58,132	58,490	−0.61%	796 sq mi (2,060 km^{2})	73/sq mi (28/km^{2})
Green	Monroe	37,227	37,093	+0.36%	584 sq mi (1,510 km^{2})	64/sq mi (25/km^{2})
Iowa	Dodgeville	23,951	23,709	+1.02%	768 sq mi (1,990 km^{2})	31/sq mi (12/km^{2})
Total		709,685	680,796	+4.24%	3,386 sq mi (8,770 km^{2})	210/sq mi (81/km^{2})

=== Combined Statistical Area ===
The Madison–Janesville–Beloit Combined Statistical Area (CSA) is made up of six counties. The statistical area includes two metropolitan areas and one micropolitan area.

- Metropolitan Statistical Areas (MSAs)
  - Madison (Columbia, Dane, Green, and Iowa counties)
  - Janesville–Beloit (Rock County)
- Micropolitan Statistical Areas (μSAs)
  - Baraboo (Sauk County)

Statistical Area	2025 estimate	2020 Census	Change	Area	Density
Madison, WI Metropolitan Statistical Area	709,685	680,796	+4.24%	3,386 sq mi (8,770 km^{2})	210/sq mi (81/km^{2})
Janesville–Beloit, WI Metropolitan Statistical Area	166,472	163,687	+1.70%	726 sq mi (1,880 km^{2})	229/sq mi (89/km^{2})
Baraboo, WI Micropolitan Statistical Area	66,652	65,763	+1.35%	849 sq mi (2,200 km^{2})	79/sq mi (30/km^{2})
Total	942,809	910,246	+3.58%	4,961 sq mi (12,850 km^{2})	190/sq mi (73/km^{2})

Historical population
Census	Pop.	Note	%±
1840	7,028		—
1850	69,416		887.7%
1860	162,791		134.5%
1870	192,943		18.5%
1880	194,207		0.7%
1890	206,572		6.4%
1900	230,598		11.6%
1910	241,109		4.6%
1920	261,670		8.5%
1930	291,385		11.4%
1940	320,791		10.1%
1950	378,060		17.9%
1960	454,377		20.2%
1970	547,469		20.5%
1980	599,470		9.5%
1990	649,147		8.3%
2000	742,953		14.5%
2010	827,742		11.4%
2020	910,246		10.0%
U.S. Decennial Census; 1790–1960 1900–1990; 1990–2000 2010–2014

The CSA totals are the totals of all the counties listed above, regardless of whether they were included in the Combined Statistical Area at the time.

== Communities ==
The following are the incorporated communities of the Madison–Janesville–Beloit Combined Statistical Area. Populations listed are 2025 estimates.

Communities marked with an asterisk (*) are part of the Janesville–Beloit metropolitan statistical area (Rock County). Communities marked with a cross (†) are part of the Baraboo micropolitan statistical area (Sauk County). The remainder are part of the Madison metropolitan statistical area.

=== Cities with more than 50,000 inhabitants ===
- Madison (286,233)
- Janesville* (66,929)

=== Cities with 10,000 to 50,000 inhabitants ===
- Baraboo† (13,224)
- Beloit* (36,649)
- Fitchburg (34,615)
- Middleton (23,115)
- Monroe (10,581)
- Reedsburg† (10,641)
- Stoughton (13,256)
- Sun Prairie (39,227)
- Verona (16,821)

=== Cities with less than 10,000 inhabitants ===
- Brodhead (3,214)
- Columbus (5,400)
- Dodgeville (5,076)
- Edgerton* (6,121)
- Evansville* (5,837)
- Lodi (3,190)
- Milton* (6,024)
- Mineral Point (2,555)
- Monona (8,664)
- Portage (9,956)
- Wisconsin Dells† (partial) (3,149 total)

=== Villages with more than 10,000 inhabitants ===
- DeForest (13,094)
- Oregon (12,015)
- Waunakee (16,411)
- Windsor (10,085)

=== Villages with less than 10,000 inhabitants ===
- Albany (1,089)
- Arena (916)
- Arlington (860)
- Avoca (547)
- Barneveld (1,333)
- Belleville (2,705)
- Black Earth (1,523)
- Blanchardville (partial) (829 total)
- Blue Mounds (892)
- Brooklyn (1,547)
- Browntown (242)
- Cambria (765)
- Cambridge (partial) (1,679 total)
- Cazenovia† (partial) (350 total)
- Clinton* (2,336)
- Cobb (481)
- Cottage Grove (8,930)
- Cross Plains (4,182)
- Dane (1,119)
- Deerfield (2,619)
- Doylestown (272)
- Fall River (1,853)
- Footville* (898)
- Friesland (317)
- Highland (860)
- Hollandale (301)
- Ironton† (260)
- La Valle† (345)
- Lake Delton† (3,451)
- Lime Ridge† (156)
- Livingston (partial) (636 total)
- Loganville† (285)
- Maple Bluff (1,305)
- Marshall (3,696)
- Mazomanie (1,746)
- Merrimac† (523)
- McFarland (9,145)
- Montfort (partial) (734 total)
- Monticello (1,173)
- Mount Horeb (7,725)
- New Glarus (2,266)
- North Freedom† (572)
- Orfordville* (1,618)
- Pardeeville (2,248)
- Plain† (717)
- Poynette (2,924)
- Prairie du Sac† (4,316)
- Randolph (partial) (1,771 total)
- Rewey (252)
- Ridgeway (650)
- Rio (1,123)
- Rock Springs† (348)
- Rockdale (201)
- Sauk City† (3,439)
- Shorewood Hills (2,155)
- Spring Green† (1,567)
- West Baraboo† (1,572)
- Wyocena (733)

=== Census-designated places ===
- Bluffview†
- Hanover*
- Juda
- Lake Wisconsin

== Towns ==
=== Columbia County ===
- Arlington
- Caledonia
- Columbus
- Courtland
- Dekorra
- Fort Winnebago
- Fountain Prairie
- Hampden
- Leeds
- Lewiston
- Lodi
- Lowville
- Marcellon
- Newport
- Otsego
- Pacific
- Randolph
- Scott
- Springvale
- West Point
- Wyocena

=== Dane County ===
- Albion
- Berry
- Black Earth
- Blooming Grove
- Blue Mounds
- Bristol
- Burke
- Christiana
- Cottage Grove
- Cross Plains
- Dane
- Deerfield
- Dunkirk
- Dunn
- Madison
- Mazomanie
- Medina
- Middleton
- Monona
- Montrose
- Oregon
- Perry
- Pleasant Springs
- Primrose
- Roxbury
- Rutland
- Springdale
- Springfield
- Sun Prairie
- Vermont
- Verona
- Vienna
- Westport
- York

=== Green County ===
- Adams
- Albany
- Brooklyn
- Cadiz
- Clarno
- Decatur
- Exeter
- Jefferson
- Jordan
- Monroe
- Mount Pleasant
- New Glarus
- Spring Grove
- Sylvester
- Washington
- York

=== Iowa County ===
- Arena
- Brigham
- Clyde
- Dodgeville
- Eden
- Highland
- Linden
- Mifflin
- Mineral Point
- Moscow
- Pulaski
- Ridgeway
- Waldwick
- Wyoming

=== Rock County ===
- Avon
- Beloit
- Bradford
- Center
- Clinton
- Fulton
- Harmony
- Janesville
- Johnstown
- La Prairie
- Lima
- Magnolia
- Milton
- Newark
- Plymouth
- Porter
- Rock
- Spring Valley
- Turtle
- Union

=== Sauk County ===
- Baraboo
- Bear Creek
- Dellona
- Delton
- Excelsior
- Fairfield
- Franklin
- Freedom
- Greenfield
- Honey Creek
- Ironton
- La Valle
- Merrimac
- Prairie du Sac
- Reedsburg
- Spring Green
- Sumpter
- Troy
- Washington
- Westfield
- Winfield
- Woodland

== Demographics ==
As of the census of 2000, there were 501,774 people, 202,687 households, and 121,171 families residing within the MSA. The racial makeup of the MSA was 90.26% White, 3.50% African American, 0.32% Native American, 2.99% Asian, 0.03% Pacific Islander, 1.27% from other races, and 1.63% from two or more races. Hispanic or Latino of any race were 3.05% of the population.

The median income for a household in the MSA was $45,602, and the median income for a family was $55,159. Males had a median income of $35,250 versus $26,322 for females. The per capita income for the MSA was $21,832.

== See also ==
- Wisconsin census statistical areas
