= Adams, Wisconsin (disambiguation) =

Adams in the U.S. state of Wisconsin may refer to:

- Adams, Adams County, Wisconsin, a town
- Adams, Wisconsin, a city in Adams County
- Adams, Green County, Wisconsin, a town
- Adams, Jackson County, Wisconsin, a town
- Adams, Walworth County, Wisconsin, an unincorporated community
- Adams Center, Wisconsin, a ghost town
