= Wisconsin Highway 104 =

State highway in Wisconsin, United States

State Trunk Highway 104
- WIS 104 highlighted in red

Route information
- Maintained by WisDOT
- Length: 15.4 mi (24.8 km)

Major junctions
- South end: WIS 11 in Brodhead
- North end: WIS 92 in Brooklyn

Location
- Country: United States
- State: Wisconsin
- Counties: Green, Rock, Dane

Highway system
- Wisconsin State Trunk Highway System; Interstate; US; State; Scenic; Rustic
← WIS 103	→ WIS 105

State Trunk Highway 104 (often called Highway 104, STH-104 or WIS 104) is a state highway in the US state of Wisconsin. It runs in a north–south direction in south central Wisconsin from Brodhead to Brooklyn. It was first designated in 1919–1920 before being rerouted in 1923–1926 and extended in 1999.

== Route description ==
WIS 104 is a two-lane undivided highway for its entire length, travelling straight north-south along the Green County line from WIS 11 in Brodhead to WIS 92 in Brooklyn. Starting at Brodhead as a continuation of County Trunk Highway T (CTH-T), WIS 104 begins to travel northward from WIS 11 and CTH-T. Then, after 6.2 miles (10.0 km), it runs concurrently with WIS 59. After leaving the concurrency, it then travels under 3.2 miles (5.1 km) before a short, 0.2-mile (0.32 km) concurrency with CTH-C after which it travels another 4.5 miles (7.2 km) before ending at WIS 92 in Brooklyn. The road continues north as CTH-MM.

== History ==
WIS 104 was first designated in 1919–1920, running along its current route north of Broadhead before turning east then north to WIS 10 in Evansville. In 1923–1926, the highway was rerouted, removing all of its sections not on the current route and adding a short section to connect to WIS 59. Its route then remained unchanged until 1999 when it was extended 8.9 miles (14.3 km) north to its present northern terminus at WIS 92 in Brooklyn.

== Major intersections ==
The entire highway is along the Green county line.

County	Location	mi	km	Destinations	Notes
Green–Rock county line	Brodhead	0.0	0.0	WIS 11 – Brodhead, Janesville	
Green–Rock county line	Town of Magnolia	4.0	6.4	CTH-B east	
Green–Rock county line	Town of Magnolia	5.5	8.9	CTH-A east	
Green–Rock county line	Albany–Magnolia town line	6.3	10.1	WIS 59 west – Albany, Monroe	Southern end of WIS 59 concurrency
Green–Rock county line	Albany–Magnolia town line	7.5	12.1	WIS 59 east – Evansville	Northern end of WIS 59 concurrency
Green–Rock county line	Brooklyn–Union town line	10.7	17.2	CTH-C west	Southern end of CTH-C concurrency
Green–Rock county line	Brooklyn–Union town line	10.9	17.5	CTH-C east	Northern end of CTH-C concurrency
Green–Dane county line	Village of Brooklyn	15.4	24.8	WIS 92 (Church Street)	
1.000 mi = 1.609 km; 1.000 km = 0.621 mi
