= Clarno =

Clarno may refer to:

== Locations ==
- Clarno, Oregon
- Clarno, Wisconsin
  - Clarno (community), Wisconsin
- Clarno Township, Lake County, South Dakota

== Other ==
- Clarno Formation, an Eocene geologic formation in Central Oregon
- Beverly Clarno, politician in the U.S. state of Oregon
