= Wisconsin Highway 92 =

State highway in Wisconsin, United States

State Trunk Highway 92
- WIS 92 highlighted in red

Route information
- Maintained by WisDOT
- Length: 30.68 mi (49.37 km)

Major junctions
- West end: Bus. US 18 / Bus. US 151 / WIS 78 in Mount Horeb
- East end: US 14 east of Brooklyn

Location
- Country: United States
- State: Wisconsin
- Counties: Green, Dane

Highway system
- Wisconsin State Trunk Highway System; Interstate; US; State; Scenic; Rustic
| ← WIS 91 | → WIS 93 |

State Trunk Highway 92 (often called Highway 92, STH-92 or WIS 92) is a 30.68 miles (49.37 km) state highway in Green and Dane counties in the south-central area of the US state of Wisconsin that runs north–south from Mount Horeb to near Brooklyn.

== Route description ==
WIS 92 begins at a roundabout junction with WIS 78 in Mount Horeb, heading south and crossing US Highway 18/151 (US 18/151) and heading southeast through the Driftless Area and passing through Mount Vernon before joining WIS 69. The concurrency enters Belleville. In Belleville, WIS 69 leaves the concurrency to head north towards Verona. WIS 92 continues east for several miles and passes through Brooklyn and the northern terminus of WIS 104. The highway continues for a couple of miles and ends at a roundabout junction with US 14.

== Major intersections ==
| County | Location | mi | km | Destinations | Notes |
|---|---|---|---|---|---|
| Dane | Mount Horeb | | | Bus. US 18 / Bus. US 151 / WIS 78 south (Springdale Street) / WIS 78 north (8th Street) | Roundabout; roadway continues as northbound WIS 78 |
| Dane | Primrose–Montrose town line | | | WIS 69 south – Monroe | Western end of WIS 69 overlap |
| Dane | Belleville | | | WIS 69 north – Verona | Eastern end of WIS 69 overlap |
| Green | No major junctions | | | | |
| Green–Dane county line | Village of Brooklyn | | | WIS 104 south / CTH-MM | |
| Dane | Town of Rutland | | | US 14 – Madison, Evansville | |
1.000 mi = 1.609 km; 1.000 km = 0.621 mi: Concurrency terminus
