= Fordyce R. Melvin =

American politician (1832–1915)

Fordyce Rust Melvin (July 23, 1832 – January 4, 1915) was an American farmer, businessman, and politician.

Born in Chester Township, Geauga County, Ohio, Melvin moved to Cattaraugus County, New York in 1848. In 1851, Melvin moved to Green County, Wisconsin and settled in the town of Brooklyn. During the American Civil War, Melvin served in the 2nd Wisconsin Volunteer Infantry Regiment. He was wounded at Bull Run and was discharged. Melvin then enlisted in the 24th New York Volunteer Infantry Regiment and was again wounded. Melvin was a farmer and was an agent for the American Express Company; he was also involved with the fire insurance business and public conveyance. Melvin served as county treasurer for Green County and was a Republican. In 1879, Melvin served in the Wisconsin State Assembly. Melvin died at his home in Brooklyn, Wisconsin.
