= Charter Oak Mills, Wisconsin =

- Ghost town
- Location within Wisconsin Location within the United States
- Coordinates: 44°16′07″N 90°52′30″W
- Country: United States
- State: Wisconsin
- County: Jackson
- Town: Albion
- Elevation: 768 ft (234 m)
- GNIS feature ID: 1845430

Charter Oak Mills is a ghost town in the town of Albion, Jackson County, Wisconsin, United States. Charter Oak Mills was located along what is now Wisconsin Highway 54 2.1 miles (3.4 km) south-southwest of Black River Falls.
