= Disco, Wisconsin =

- Unincorporated community
- Location within Wisconsin Location within the United States
- Coordinates: 44°15′44″N 91°00′33″W
- Country: United States
- State: Wisconsin
- County: Jackson
- Town: Albion
- Elevation: 968 ft (295 m)
- Time zone: UTC-6 (Central (CST))
  - Summer (DST): UTC-5 (CDT)
- Area codes: 715 & 534
- GNIS feature ID: 1563988

Disco is an unincorporated community located in the town of Albion, Jackson County, Wisconsin, United States. Disco is 8 miles (13 km) west-southwest of Black River Falls.
