= Attica, Wisconsin =

- Unincorporated community
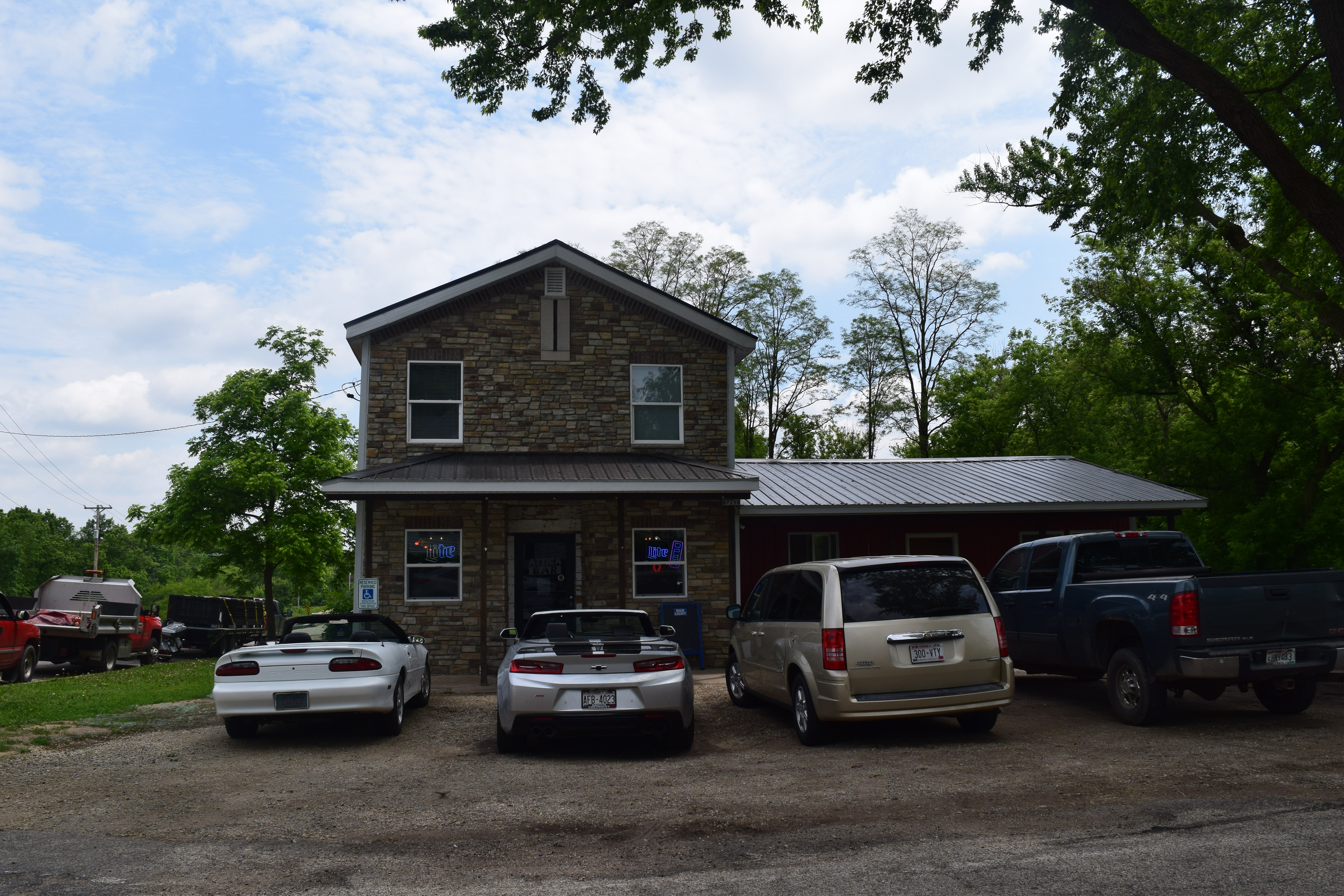
- Attica Bar

- Location within Wisconsin Location within the United States
- Coordinates: 42°46′12″N 89°28′50″W
- Country: United States
- State: Wisconsin
- County: Green
- Town: Brooklyn
- Elevation: 833 ft (254 m)
- Time zone: UTC-6 (Central (CST))
  - Summer (DST): UTC-5 (CDT)
- Area code: 608
- GNIS feature ID: 1560998

Attica is an unincorporated community located in the town of Brooklyn, Green County, Wisconsin, United States. Attica is located at the junction of County Highways C and X, 5 miles (8.0 km) north-northwest of Albany.

== History ==
Attica was the third name for the community, after Winneshiek and Milford. The local post office was named Attica after Attica, New York and the community later took the name.

== Notable people ==
- Romanzo E. Davis, Wisconsin State Senator
- Frank A. Day, Lieutenant Governor of Minnesota
