= Albion, Jackson County, Wisconsin =

Albion, Wisconsin
- Town
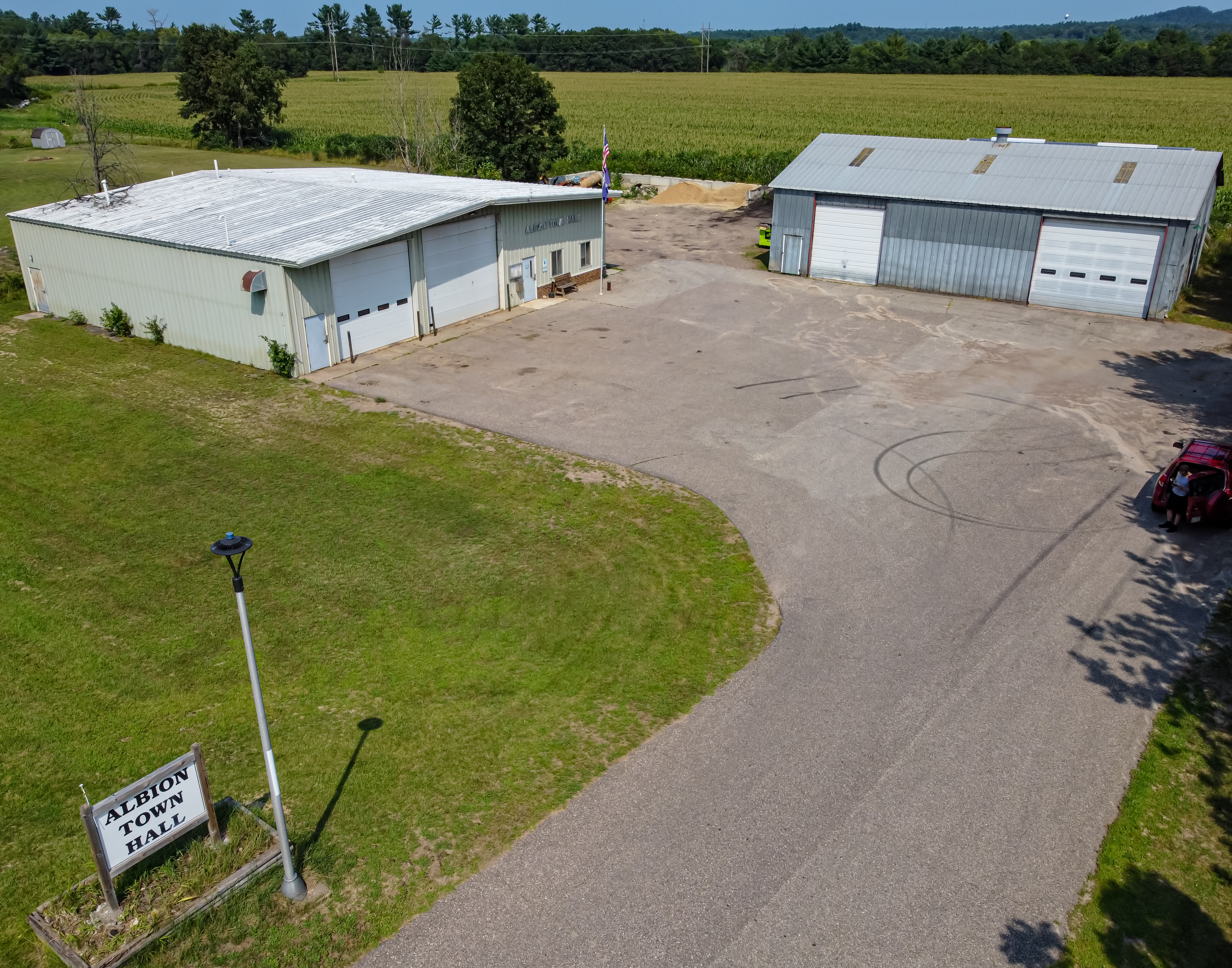
- Town hall south of Black River Falls on Wis-54

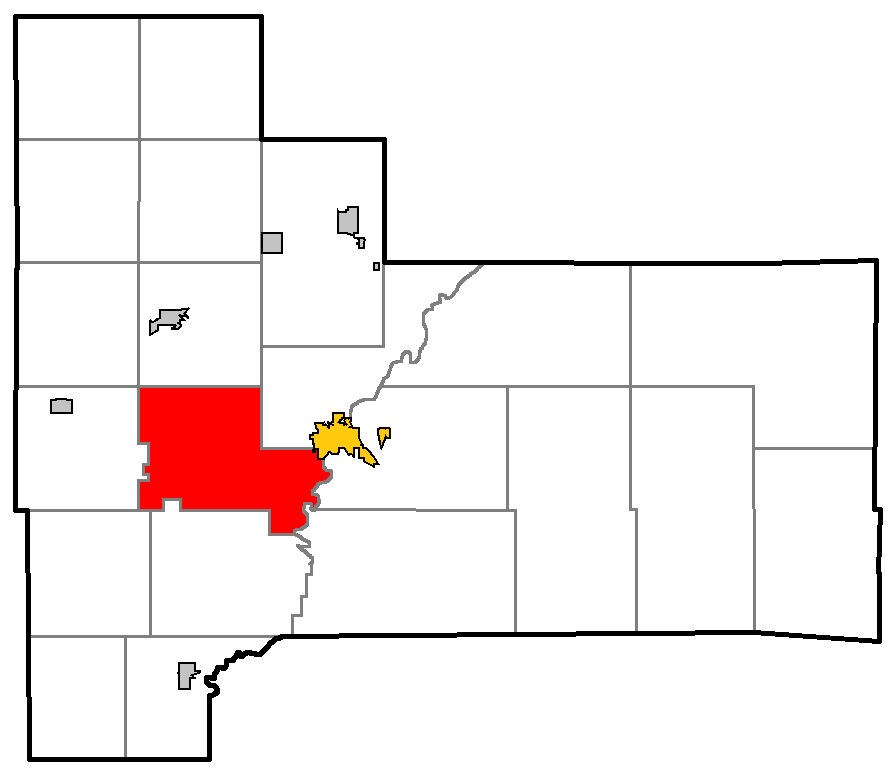
- Location of Albion, Jackson County

- Location of Jackson County, Wisconsin
- Coordinates: 44°17′5″N 90°57′0″W
- Country: United States
- State: Wisconsin
- County: Jackson

Area
  - Total: 45.8 sq mi (118.5 km^{2})
  - Land: 45.6 sq mi (118.0 km^{2})
  - Water: 0.19 sq mi (0.5 km^{2})
- Elevation: 942 ft (287 m)

Population (2020)
  - Total: 1,197
  - Density: 26.27/sq mi (10.14/km^{2})
- Time zone: UTC-6 (Central (CST))
  - Summer (DST): UTC-5 (CDT)
- FIPS code: 55-00900
- GNIS feature ID: 1582669
- Website: https://townofalbionjacksoncounty.com/

Albion is a town in Jackson County, Wisconsin, United States. The population was 1,197 at the 2020 census. The unincorporated community of Disco is located in the town.

== History ==
Albion was the first township of the county, originally encompassing all of its territory. Most recently, Adams was organized out of a portion of Albion in 1938.

The ghost town of Charter Oak Mills was located in the town.

== Geography ==
According to the United States Census Bureau, the town has a total area of 45.8 square miles (118.5 km^{2}), of which 45.6 square miles (118.0 km^{2}) is land and 0.2 square mile (0.5 km^{2}) (0.44%) is water.

== Demographics ==
As of the census of 2000, there were 1,093 people, 413 households, and 311 families residing in the town. The population density was 24.0 people per square mile (9.3/km^{2}). There were 461 housing units at an average density of 10.1 per square mile (3.9/km^{2}). The racial makeup of the town was 95.61% White, 2.93% Native American, 0.18% Asian, 0.09% Pacific Islander, 0.18% from other races, and 1.01% from two or more races. Hispanic or Latino of any race were 0.55% of the population.

There were 413 households, out of which 36.6% had children under the age of 18 living with them, 66.1% were married couples living together, 6.8% had a female householder with no husband present, and 24.5% were non-families. 20.8% of all households were made up of individuals, and 8.2% had someone living alone who was 65 years of age or older. The average household size was 2.65 and the average family size was 3.04.

In the town, the population was spread out, with 28.1% under the age of 18, 5.9% from 18 to 24, 30.3% from 25 to 44, 24.8% from 45 to 64, and 11.0% who were 65 years of age or older. The median age was 38 years. For every 100 females, there were 100.6 males. For every 100 females age 18 and over, there were 105.8 males.

The median income for a household in the town was $45,284, and the median income for a family was $50,357. Males had a median income of $34,779 versus $20,972 for females. The per capita income for the town was $18,570. About 4.7% of families and 8.8% of the population were below the poverty line, including 13.8% of those under age 18 and 11.0% of those age 65 or over.
