= Wisconsin Highway 103 =

State highway in Wisconsin, United States

State Trunk Highway 103

Route information
- Maintained by WisDOT
- Existed: 1922–1994

Location
- Country: United States
- State: Wisconsin

Highway system
- Wisconsin State Trunk Highway System; Interstate; US; State; Scenic; Rustic
← WIS 102	→ WIS 104

State Trunk Highway 103 (often called Highway 103, STH-103 or WIS 103) was a state highway in the U.S. state of Wisconsin. The highway ran through Fond du Lac and Green Lake counties.

== History ==
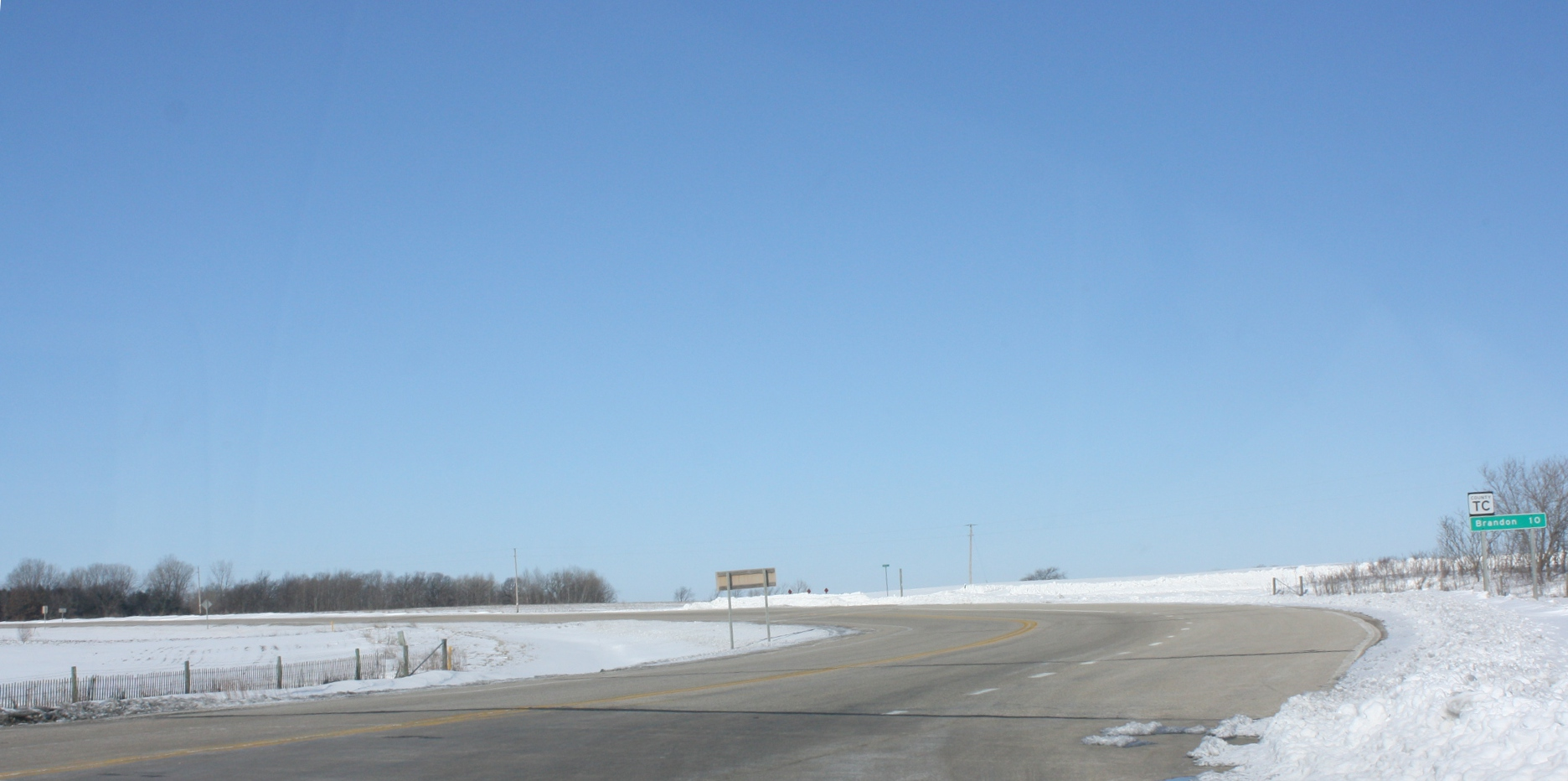
Eastern terminus

The highway number was already designated in 1922. In 1922, the highway's eastern terminus was listed at WIS 31 near Lamartine, Wisconsin. It ran east–west and had a major intersection with WIS 26 in Ladoga. It joined with WIS 49 near Brandon and continued west passing through Fairwater. Its western terminus was located at WIS 44 west of Markesan. The highway ran for 27.1 miles (43.6 km) at that time.

By 1970, the highway had been shorted to 10.7 miles. The highway's eastern terminus was located at the same place at what was then numbered U.S. Highway 151. The highway's western terminus had been changed to WIS 49 just south of Brandon.

The highway had been decommissioned by 1994 and Fond du Lac county took over control signing the remainder as County TC.

== Major intersections ==
The entire route was in Fond du Lac County.

Location	mi	km	Destinations	Notes
Brandon			WIS 49	
Ladoga			WIS 26	
Lamartine			US 151	
1.000 mi = 1.609 km; 1.000 km = 0.621 mi

== Images ==
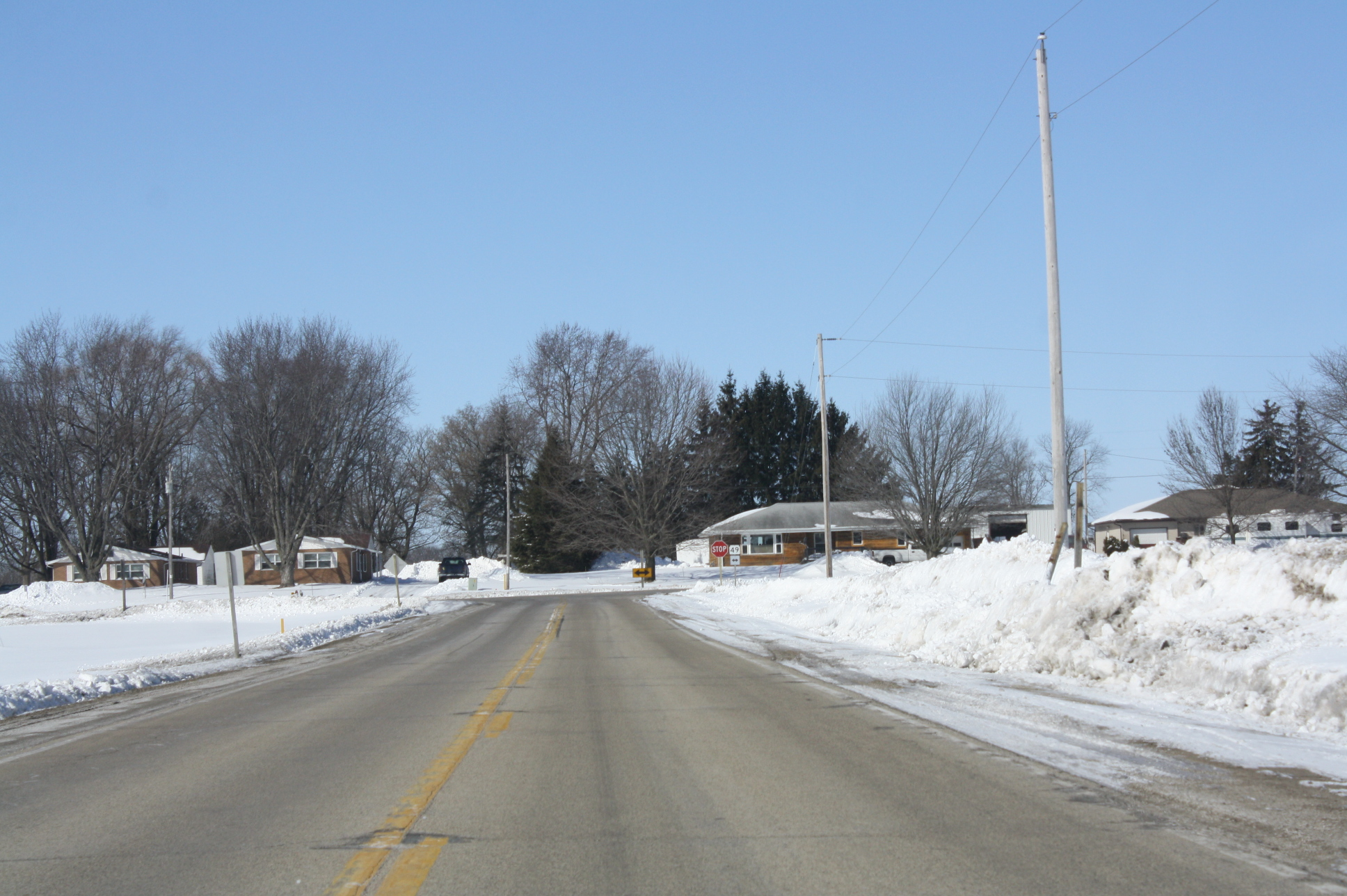
Western terminus near Brandon

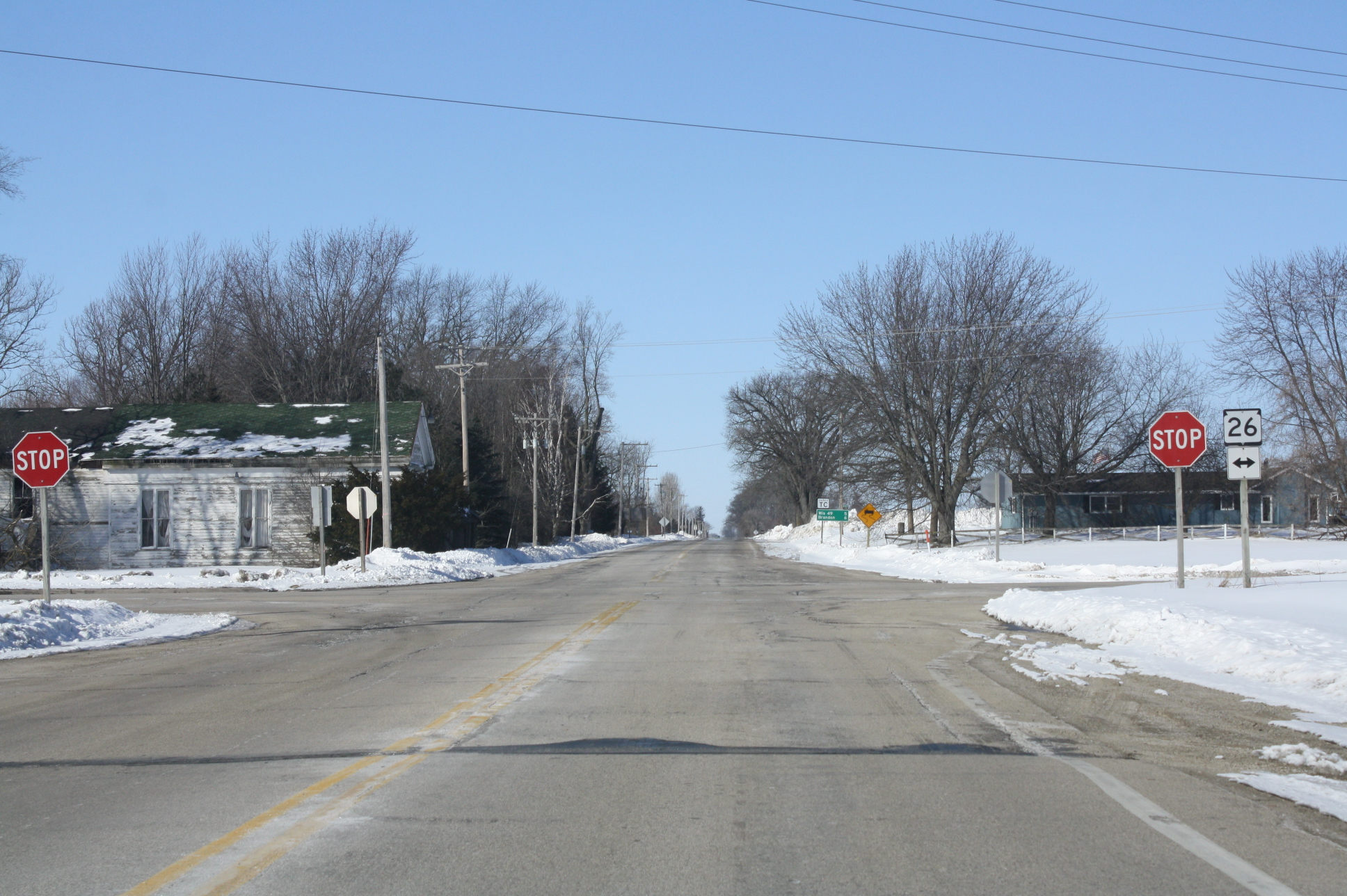
Intersection with WIS 26 at Ladoga
