= William Boyles =

American politician

William Boyles was an American politician. He was a Wisconsin Territory miner and legislator from Monroe.

== Background ==
Boyles was originally from Indiana. He was one of the first settlers of what later became Cadiz, Wisconsin, arriving there around 1834 with other ex-miners, from the lead mining regions to the west.

== In the Assembly ==
In October 1836, he was elected to serve in the 1st Wisconsin Territorial Assembly as one of seven members of the House of Representatives (the lower house) from Iowa County. He would attend the three sessions, held between October 25, 1836, and June 25, 1838.

When in December 1837, a new county was to be split off from the over-large Iowa County, Boyle as the Representative of the area was allowed to choose a name. He chose Green County, after the verdant color of the vegetation there. Another member suggested that it be modified to "Greene" after General Nathanael Greene, but Boyles insisted on his original choice.
