= Baraboo School District =

School district in Wisconsin, United States

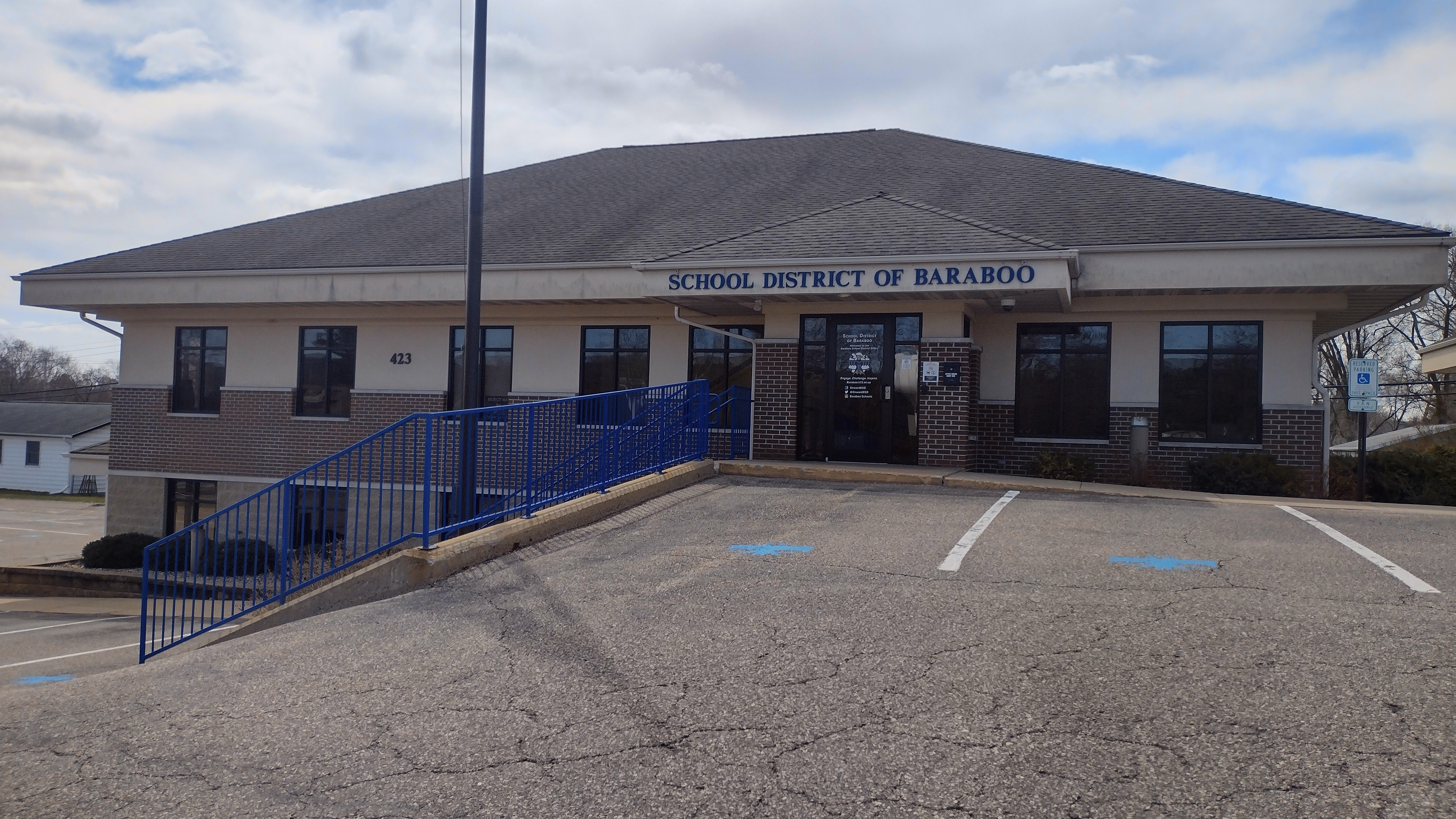
- District offices for the school district
- 423 Linn Street Baraboo, Sauk County, Wisconsin, 53913

District information
- Type: Public
- Grades: Pre-K/K–12
- Superintendent: Stephen J. Considine
- School board: Seven members
- Chair of the board: Kevin Vodak
- Schools: Elementary five, Middle one, High one
- NCES District ID: 5500810

Students and staff
- Students: 2,708
- Athletic conference: Badger
- District mascot: Thunderbird

Other information
- Website: https://www.baraboo.k12.wi.us/

The Baraboo School District is a school district based in the city of Baraboo, Wisconsin. It serves the city of Baraboo, and the villages of West Baraboo, North Freedom, a portion of Lake Delton, and the surrounding rural area.

== Schools ==
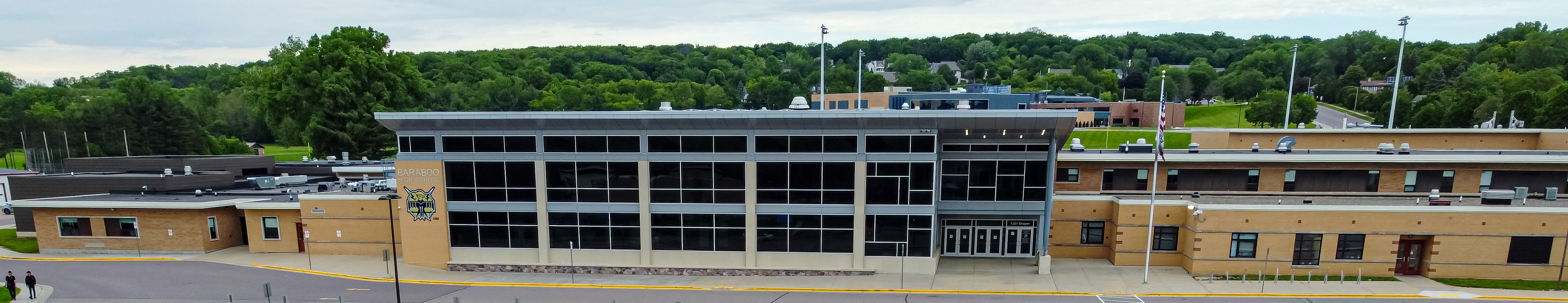
Baraboo High School in 2024

School	Year built	Description
Baraboo High School	1960s	
Jack Young Middle School	1979	
Al Behrman Elementary School	1956	The $320,555 South School opened in 1956. It is now known as Al Behrman Elementary.
East Elementary School	1954	The $372,998 school opened in 1954. A new library and media center was built circa June 2015.
Gordon L. Willson Elementary School	1970	The construction occurred in the years 1969 and 1970. In 1986 an addition on the north lawn was being built. In 1987 and 1989 the additions were installed, including a 12 classroom wing. In addition, there was an interior renovation.
North Freedom Elementary School	1902	It opened in 1902. In 1976 it had the value of $147,000 and was the only elementary school that the district was using that had not been built within 30 years prior.
West Kindergarten Center	1951	A one story school, previously operating as West Elementary School, it is between Downtown Baraboo and Oschner Park. The West School, built for $261,370, opened 1951, replacing the First Ward School, and the Second Ward School.

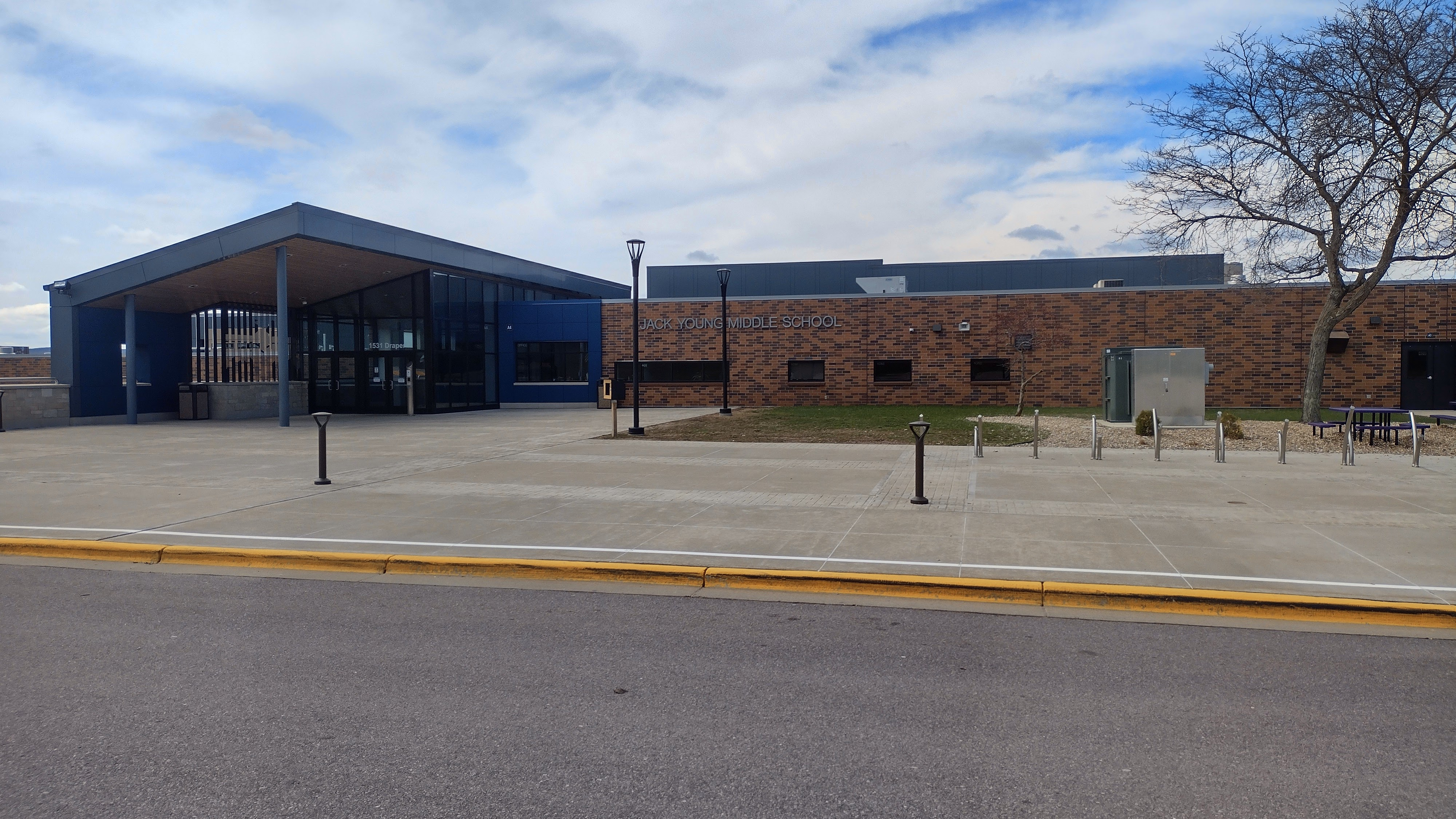
Jack Young Middle School in 2025

== Former schools ==
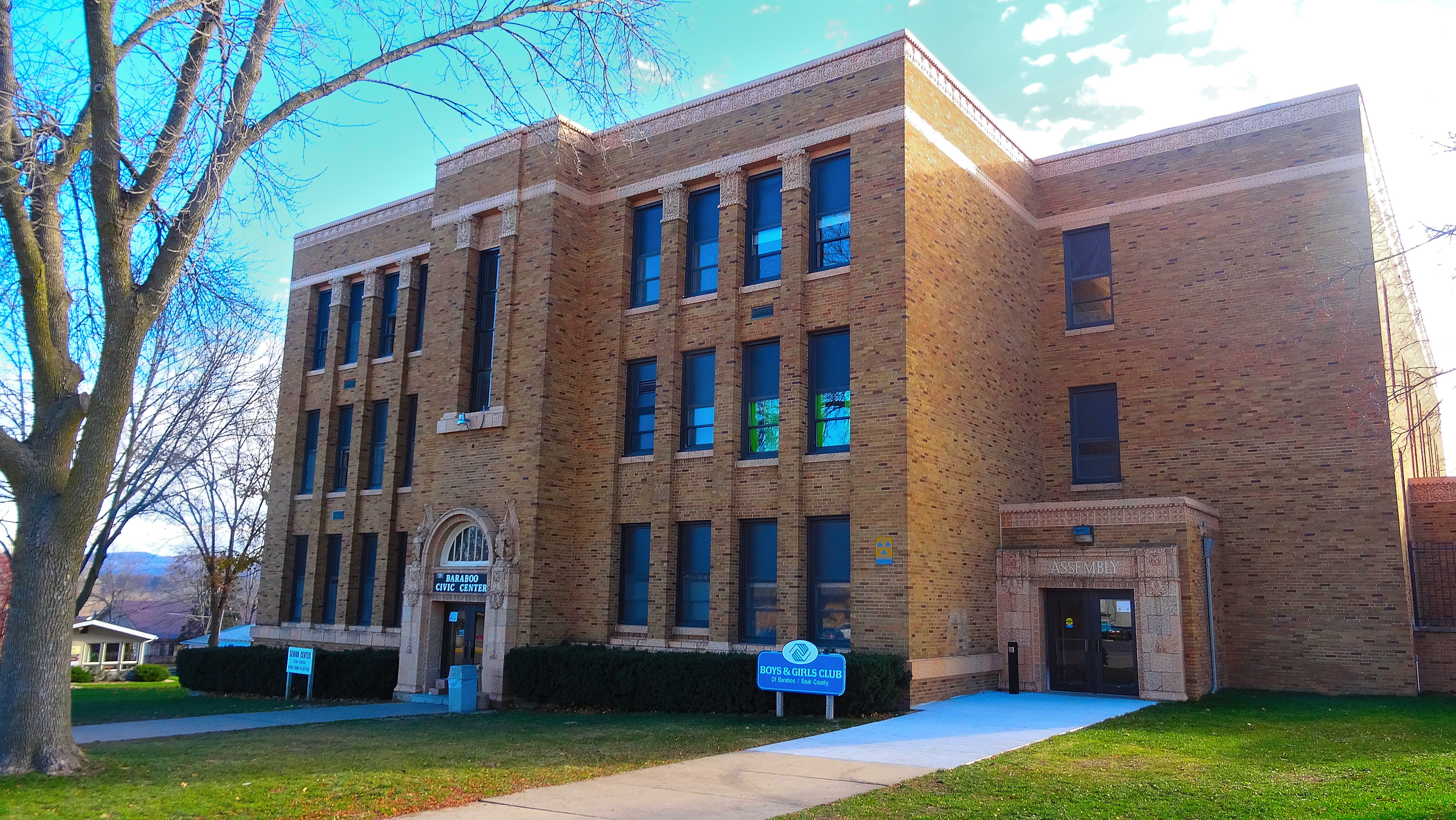
Old Baraboo High School

In 1885 the $8,000 First Ward School opened at the intersection of Summit Street and Sixth Avenue.

The Second Ward School, a Queen Anne style building, was built in 1889. The Madison company Conover & Porter designed it.

On January 9, 1883, the Third Ward School, a six classroom Queen Anne building, opened after having been under construction since 1882. The school was located at Elm Street at Grove Street. The Third Ward had a major population increase due to the 1871 construction of a railroad.

According to the Baraboo Historical Society, in 1950 a fire ruined the First Ward School building. A document posted by the Baraboo Public Library stated that the fire destroyed the Second Ward School Building.

Some former schools were acquired by the district in the 1960s. Lyons, now known as West Baraboo, was served by a wood schoolhouse until a permanent brick one was built in 1901. The former wood building became a storage unit and was relocated to Oschner Park. The brick building was razed in 1981. The $56,444 Pleasant Valley School opened in 1956. The $93,889 Fairfield Center School, located 6 miles (9.7 km) northwest of the center of Baraboo, opened in 1960.

== Leadership ==
The current superintendent is Stephen J. Considine who took over after the resignation of Dr. Rainey Briggs. On April 14th, Considine was selected for the next superintendent term starting July 1, 2025. Briggs served from July 1, 2021 until February 10, 2025.

=== Board of education ===
The district is run by a seven-member school board. Members are elected in April for staggered three-year terms.

Position	Name	Assumed office	Term ends	Electoral history	Refs
President	Tim Heilman				
Vice President	Karen Nelson				
Board Clerk	Ken Ziegler				
Treasurer	Kurt Goeckermann				
Board Member	Carolyn Bonanno				
Board Member	Amanda Sabol				
Board Member	Joey Rivas				

== History ==
The first school in Baraboo opened in 1843. A school district was organized a year later.

The City of Baraboo incorporated in 1882. When the school district was first established, the district was solely within the City of Baraboo; the district charged tuition for students living in West Baraboo in other surrounding areas. The Mayor of Baraboo appointed members of the school board.

The city had three wards upon its creation, and the initial plan was that one school building would serve one ward. New schools were built to serve those wards.

The board system changed to one where citizens vote for board members in 1938. The district expanded in size in 1961-1962, so areas previously paying tuition no longer had to.
