= Exeter, Wisconsin =

- Town
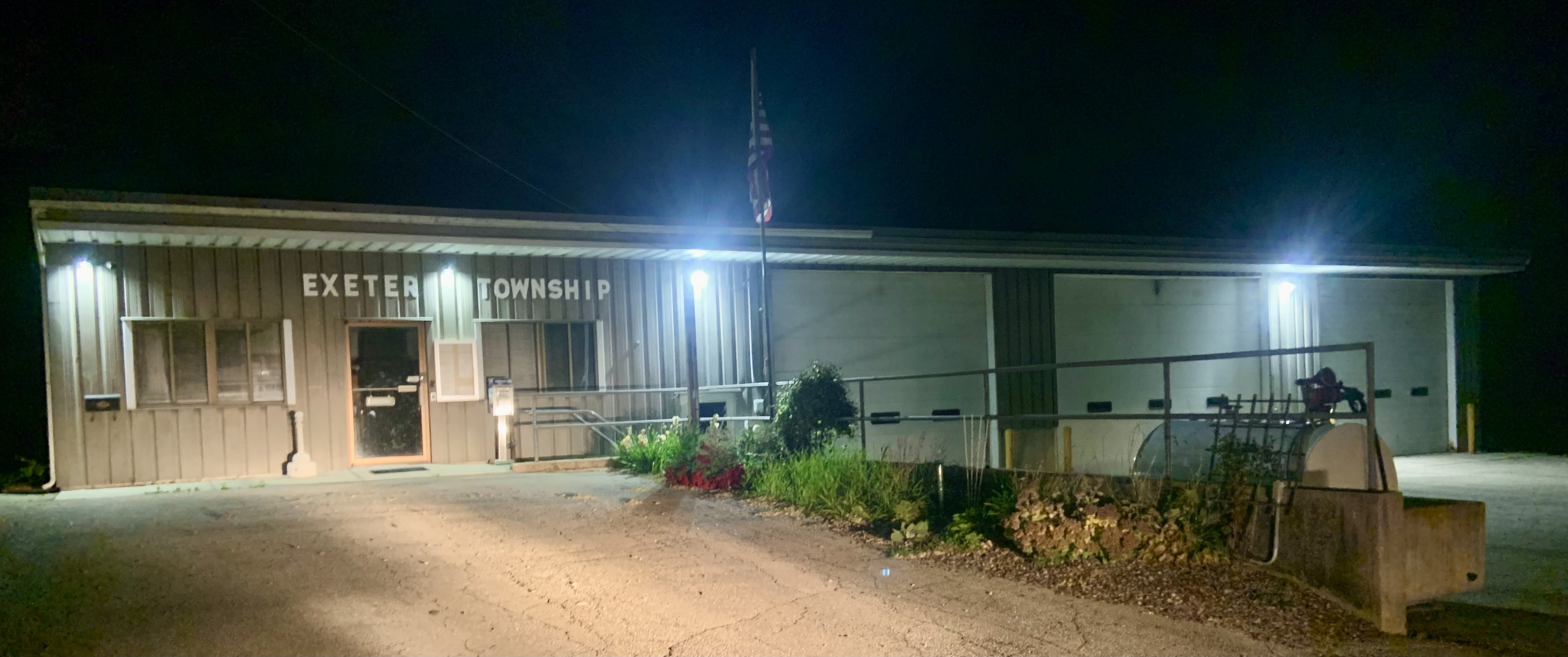
- Town hall

- Location in Green County and the state of Wisconsin.
- Coordinates: 42°48′37″N 89°32′54″W
- Country: United States
- State: Wisconsin
- County: Green

Area
  - Total: 35.1 sq mi (91.0 km^{2})
  - Land: 35.1 sq mi (91.0 km^{2})
  - Water: 0 sq mi (0.0 km^{2})
- Elevation: 1,020 ft (311 m)

Population (2020)
  - Total: 2,156
  - Density: 61.4/sq mi (23.7/km^{2})
- Time zone: UTC-6 (Central (CST))
  - Summer (DST): UTC-5 (CDT)
- Area code: 608
- FIPS code: 55-24725
- GNIS feature ID: 1583182
- Website: https://townofexeter.com/

Exeter is a town in Green County, Wisconsin, United States. The population was 2,156 at the 2020 census. The unincorporated communities of Dayton and Ross Crossing are located in the town.

== Geography ==
According to the United States Census Bureau, the town has a total area of 35.1 square miles (91.0 km^{2}), all land.

== Etymology ==
The name Exeter derives from the cathedral city of Exeter in Devon, England because of the mines located near both communities.

== History ==
The first recorded settler in Exeter was William Deviese, who settled in 1828. He was followed shortly after by settlers such as John Dougherty, Hollis Crocker, Pierce Bradley, James Slater, James Hawthorne, and Edward Beochard. Most of the early settlers come from the British Isles, Wales, Germany, and Switzerland. The town was later formed in 1849.

== Demographics ==
As of the census of 2000, there were 1,261 people, 453 households, and 370 families residing in the town. The population density was 35.9 people per square mile (13.9/km^{2}). There were 470 housing units at an average density of 13.4 per square mile (5.2/km^{2}). The racial makeup of the town was 98.65% White, 0.08% African American, 0.08% Native American, 0.40% Asian, and 0.79% from two or more races. Hispanic or Latino of any race were 0.24% of the population.

There were 453 households, out of which 38.6% had children under the age of 18 living with them, 73.3% were married couples living together, 4.6% had a female householder with no husband present, and 18.3% were non-families. 11.7% of all households were made up of individuals, and 3.1% had someone living alone who was 65 years of age or older. The average household size was 2.78 and the average family size was 3.04.

In the town, the population was spread out, with 27.1% under the age of 18, 5.4% from 18 to 24, 37.4% from 25 to 44, 22.1% from 45 to 64, and 7.9% who were 65 years of age or older. The median age was 35 years. For every 100 females, there were 110.2 males. For every 100 females age 18 and over, there were 107.0 males.

The median income for a household in the town was $58,824, and the median income for a family was $61,875. Males had a median income of $34,760 versus $31,121 for females. The per capita income for the town was $22,838. About 1.3% of families and 2.6% of the population were below the poverty line, including 2.5% of those under age 18 and 1.1% of those age 65 or over.
