= Cadiz, Wisconsin =

- Town
- Location in Green County and the state of Wisconsin.
- Coordinates: 42°32′59″N 89°46′36″W
- Country: United States
- State: Wisconsin
- County: Green

Area
  - Total: 36.6 sq mi (94.7 km^{2})
  - Land: 36.4 sq mi (94.3 km^{2})
  - Water: 0.15 sq mi (0.4 km^{2})
- Elevation: 896 ft (273 m)

Population (2020)
  - Total: 747
  - Density: 20.5/sq mi (7.92/km^{2})
- Time zone: UTC-6 (Central (CST))
  - Summer (DST): UTC-5 (CDT)
- Area code: 608
- FIPS code: 55-11725
- GNIS feature ID: 1582899
- Website: https://townofcadizwi.gov/

Cadiz is a town in Green County, Wisconsin, United States. The population was 747 at the 2020 census. The unincorporated community of Martintown is located in the town.

== History ==
The earliest white settlers of the area were from the lead mining regions of the state, farther west. The first settler of Cadiz was George Lot, originally from the State of Pennsylvania, who settled on the southeastern quarter of section 36 in 1834. He came directly from the mines, where he had been previous to the Black Hawk War. He stayed for a short time, then moved on to nearby Winslow, Illinois. Soon after Lot came ex-miners William Boyles (who would later name Green County) from Indiana, and Stephen G. Hale, Nicholas Hale and Bennett Nolan from Illinois. Abner Van Sant and his son-in-law, John Deniston, built a sawmill in the area in 1843, and laid out the community a few years later. Cadiz was named for a city in Spain.

== Geography ==
According to the United States Census Bureau, the town has a total area of 36.6 square miles (94.7 km^{2}), of which 36.4 square miles (94.3 km^{2}) is land and 0.1 square mile (0.4 km^{2}) (0.38%) is water.

== Demographics ==
As of the census of 2000, there were 863 people, 327 households, and 251 families residing in the town. The population density was 23.7 people per square mile (9.1/km^{2}). There were 349 housing units at an average density of 9.6 per square mile (3.7/km^{2}). The racial makeup of the town was 98.61% White, 0.35% African American, 0.35% from other races, and 0.70% from two or more races. Hispanic or Latino of any race were 0.81% of the population.

There were 327 households, out of which 35.2% had children under the age of 18 living with them, 66.1% were married couples living together, 5.8% had a female householder with no husband present, and 23.2% were non-families. 19.0% of all households were made up of individuals, and 6.7% had someone living alone who was 65 years of age or older. The average household size was 2.63 and the average family size was 3.02.

In the town, the population was spread out, with 26.3% under the age of 18, 6.8% from 18 to 24, 29.7% from 25 to 44, 25.4% from 45 to 64, and 11.8% who were 65 years of age or older. The median age was 39 years. For every 100 females, there were 107.5 males. For every 100 females age 18 and over, there were 103.2 males.

The median income for a household in the town was $37,500, and the median income for a family was $40,469. Males had a median income of $30,388 versus $21,034 for females. The per capita income for the town was $16,070. About 6.2% of families and 6.1% of the population were below the poverty line, including 5.7% of those under age 18 and 7.3% of those age 65 or over.
