= Adams, Jackson County, Wisconsin =

Adams, Wisconsin
- Town
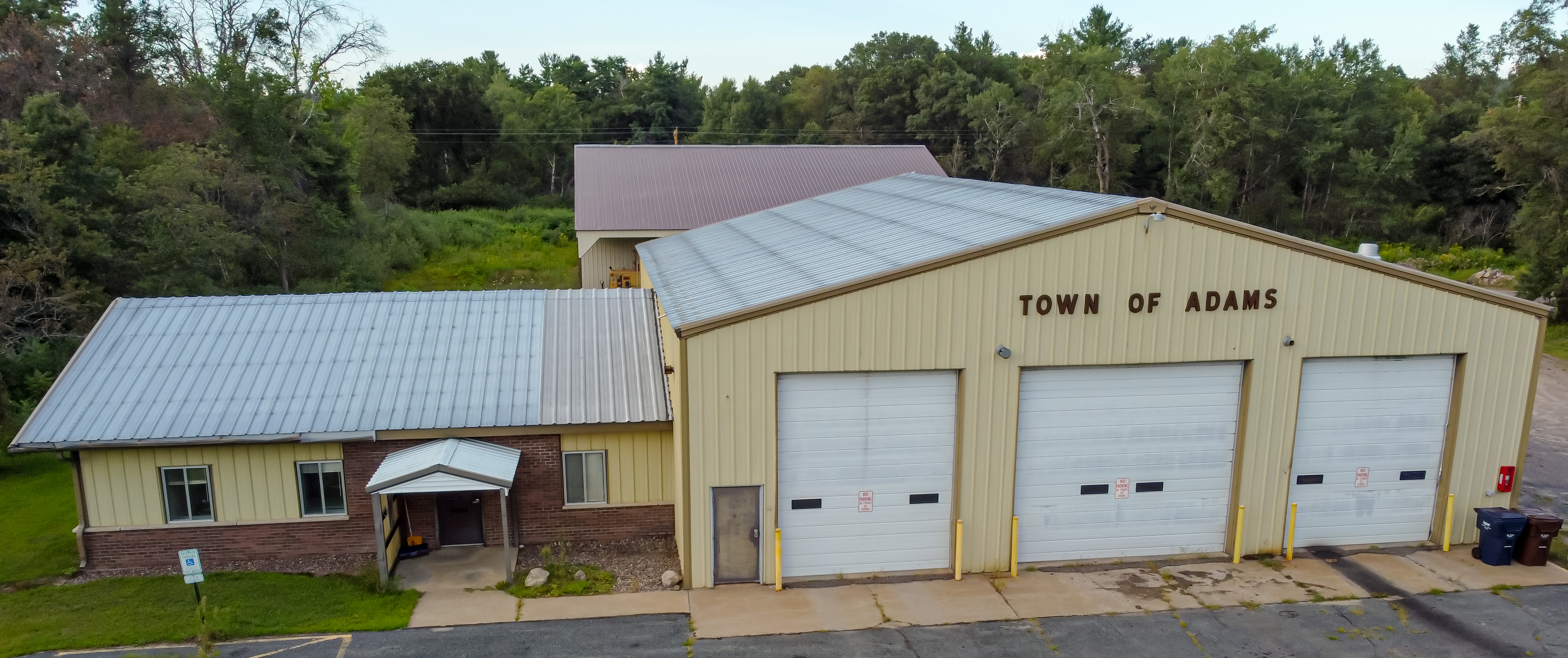
- Town hall

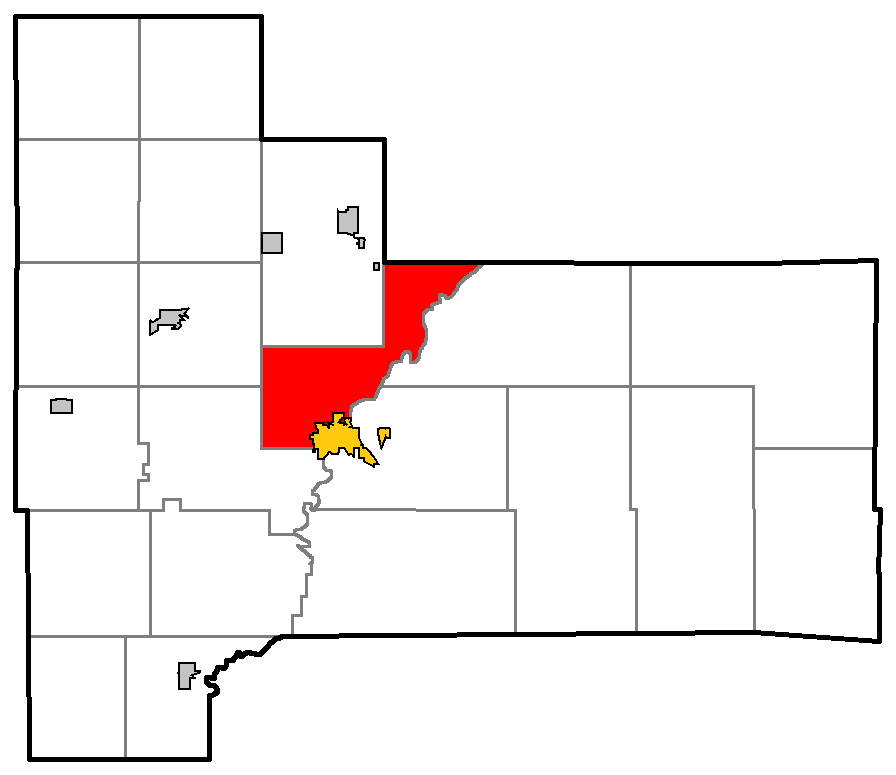
- Location of Adams, Jackson County

- Location of Jackson County, Wisconsin
- Coordinates: 44°21′39″N 90°48′20″W
- Country: United States
- State: Wisconsin
- County: Jackson

Area
  - Total: 37.0 sq mi (95.9 km^{2})
  - Land: 36.0 sq mi (93.3 km^{2})
  - Water: 1.0 sq mi (2.7 km^{2})
- Elevation: 899 ft (274 m)

Population (2020)
  - Total: 1,389
  - Density: 38.6/sq mi (14.9/km^{2})
- Time zone: UTC-6 (Central (CST))
  - Summer (DST): UTC-5 (CDT)
- FIPS code: 55-00350
- GNIS feature ID: 1582656
- Website: https://townofadamsjacksoncowi.gov/

Adams is a town in Jackson County, Wisconsin, United States. The population was 1,389 at the 2020 census.

Adams was organized in 1938, from a part of Albion town.

== Geography ==
According to the United States Census Bureau, the town has a total area of 37.0 square miles (95.9 km^{2}), of which 36.0 square miles (93.3 km^{2}) is land and 1.0 square mile (2.7 km^{2}) (2.81%) is water.

== Demographics ==
As of the census of 2000, there were 1,208 people, 485 households, and 353 families residing in the town. The population density was 33.6 people per square mile (13.0/km^{2}). There were 564 housing units at an average density of 15.7 per square mile (6.0/km^{2}). The racial makeup of the town was 94.54% White, 0.33% African American, 3.73% Native American, 0.25% Asian, 0.50% from other races, and 0.66% from two or more races. Hispanic or Latino of any race were 1.24% of the population.

There were 485 households, out of which 27.0% had children under the age of 18 living with them, 60.8% were married couples living together, 8.0% had a female householder with no husband present, and 27.2% were non-families. 20.6% of all households were made up of individuals, and 6.6% had someone living alone who was 65 years of age or older. The average household size was 2.47 and the average family size was 2.84.

In the town, the population was spread out, with 21.5% under the age of 18, 6.7% from 18 to 24, 27.2% from 25 to 44, 29.6% from 45 to 64, and 15.1% who were 65 years of age or older. The median age was 42 years. For every 100 females, there were 113.4 males. For every 100 females age 18 and over, there were 109.7 males.

The median income for a household in the town was $44,191, and the median income for a family was $50,288. Males had a median income of $30,481 versus $22,188 for females. The per capita income for the town was $19,729. About 2.7% of families and 4.8% of the population were below the poverty line, including 0.4% of those under age 18 and 13.4% of those age 65 or over.
