= West Baraboo, Wisconsin =

- Village
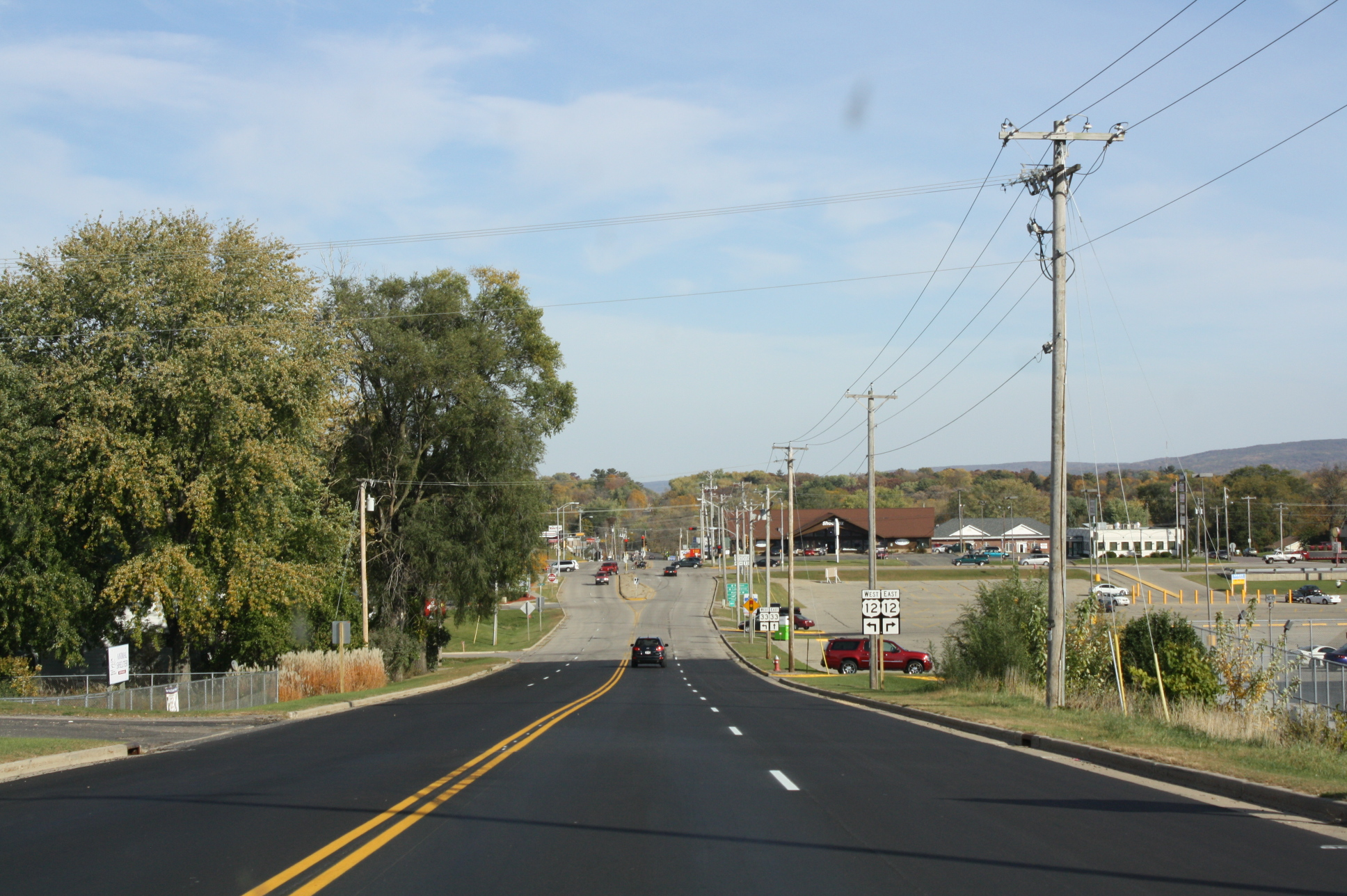
- Downtown West Baraboo on WIS 136

- Location of West Baraboo in Sauk County, Wisconsin.
- Coordinates: 43°28′33″N 89°45′55″W
- Country: United States
- State: Wisconsin
- County: Sauk
- Incorporated: February 9, 1956

Area
  - Total: 1.27 sq mi (3.28 km^{2})
  - Land: 1.25 sq mi (3.23 km^{2})
  - Water: 0.019 sq mi (0.05 km^{2})
- Elevation: 890 ft (270 m)

Population (2020)
  - Total: 1,627
  - Density: 1,141/sq mi (440.6/km^{2})
- Time zone: UTC-6 (Central (CST))
  - Summer (DST): UTC-5 (CDT)
- Area code: 608
- FIPS code: 55-85325
- GNIS feature ID: 1576445
- Website: https://villageofwestbaraboo.com/

West Baraboo is a village along the Baraboo River in Sauk County, Wisconsin, United States. The population was 1,627 at the 2020 census. It is part of the Baraboo micropolitan statistical area.

West Baraboo was previously known as Lyons.

== Geography ==
West Baraboo is located at 43°28′33″N 89°45′55″W (43.475972, -89.765390).

According to the United States Census Bureau, the village has a total area of 1.25 square miles (3.24 km^{2}), of which 1.24 square miles (3.21 km^{2}) is land and 0.01 square miles (0.03 km^{2}) is water.

== Demographics ==
Historical population
Census	Pop.	Note	%±
1960	613		—
1970	563		−8.2%
1980	846		50.3%
1990	1,021		20.7%
2000	1,248		22.2%
2010	1,414		13.3%
2020	1,627		15.1%
U.S. Decennial Census

=== 2010 census ===
As of the census of 2010, there were 1,414 people, 595 households, and 365 families living in the village. The population density was 1,140.3 inhabitants per square mile (440.3/km^{2}). There were 638 housing units at an average density of 514.5 per square mile (198.6/km^{2}). The racial makeup of the village was 92.8% White, 1.1% African American, 1.9% Native American, 1.6% Asian, 1.3% from other races, and 1.4% from two or more races. Hispanic or Latino of any race were 5.0% of the population.

There were 595 households, of which 30.4% had children under the age of 18 living with them, 42.0% were married couples living together, 13.1% had a female householder with no husband present, 6.2% had a male householder with no wife present, and 38.7% were non-families. 27.1% of all households were made up of individuals, and 5.7% had someone living alone who was 65 years of age or older. The average household size was 2.38 and the average family size was 2.87.

The median age in the village was 33.1 years. 22.5% of residents were under the age of 18; 12.3% were between the ages of 18 and 24; 29.8% were from 25 to 44; 25.3% were from 45 to 64; and 10.1% were 65 years of age or older. The gender makeup of the village was 49.9% male and 50.1% female.

=== 2000 census ===
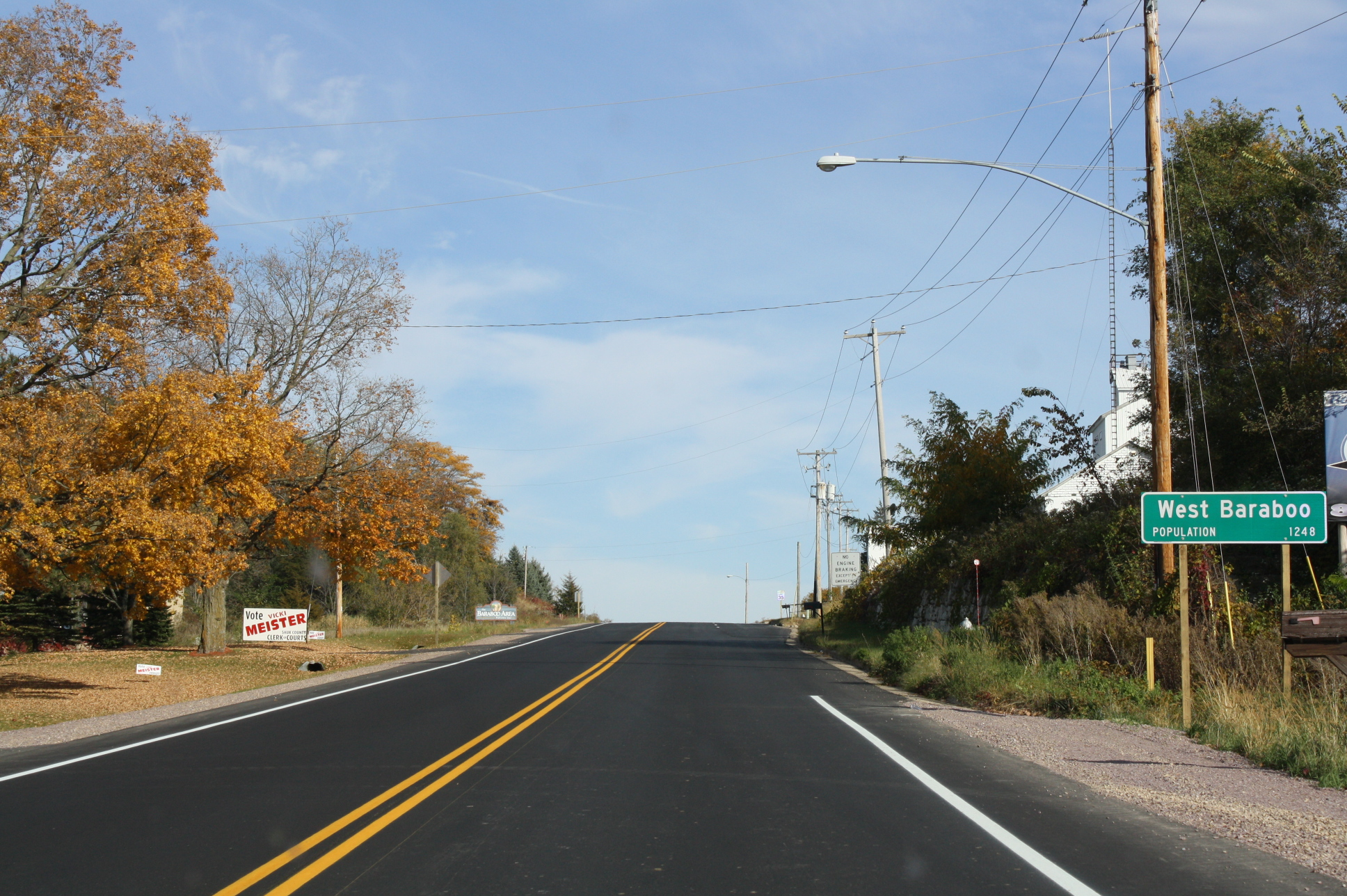
Sign on Wisconsin Highway 136

As of the census of 2000, there were 1,248 people, 477 households, and 321 families living in the village. The population density was 1,533.8 people per square mile (594.9/km^{2}). There were 490 housing units at an average density of 602.2 per square mile (233.6/km^{2}). The racial makeup of the village was 96.07% White, 0.56% African American, 1.76% Native American, 0.48% Asian, 0.08% Pacific Islander, 0.40% from other races, and 0.64% from two or more races. Hispanic or Latino of any race were 1.60% of the population.

There were 477 households, out of which 35.8% had children under the age of 18 living with them, 54.3% were married couples living together, 9.9% had a female householder with no husband present, and 32.7% were non-families. 25.2% of all households were made up of individuals, and 9.9% had someone living alone who was 65 years of age or older. The average household size was 2.59 and the average family size was 3.19.

In the village, the population was spread out, with 29.2% under the age of 18, 7.1% from 18 to 24, 31.7% from 25 to 44, 20.4% from 45 to 64, and 11.7% who were 65 years of age or older. The median age was 34 years. For every 100 females, there were 99.7 males. For every 100 females age 18 and over, there were 101.1 males.

The median income for a household in the village was $41,618, and the median income for a family was $51,406. Males had a median income of $34,792 versus $21,974 for females. The per capita income for the village was $18,283. About 5.3% of families and 6.2% of the population were below the poverty line, including 7.2% of those under age 18 and 4.0% of those age 65 or over.

== Education ==
West Baraboo is within the Baraboo School District, which operates Baraboo High School. The Baraboo School District absorbed other school districts in 1961–1962. Prior to that time, people outside of the City of Baraboo, including those in West Baraboo, had to pay tuition to send children to Baraboo High.

Lyons was served by a wood schoolhouse until a permanent brick one was built in 1901. The former wood building became a storage unit and was relocated to Oschner Park. The brick building was razed in 1981.

== See also ==
- List of villages in Wisconsin
