= Monroe (town), Green County, Wisconsin =

Monroe, Wisconsin
- Township
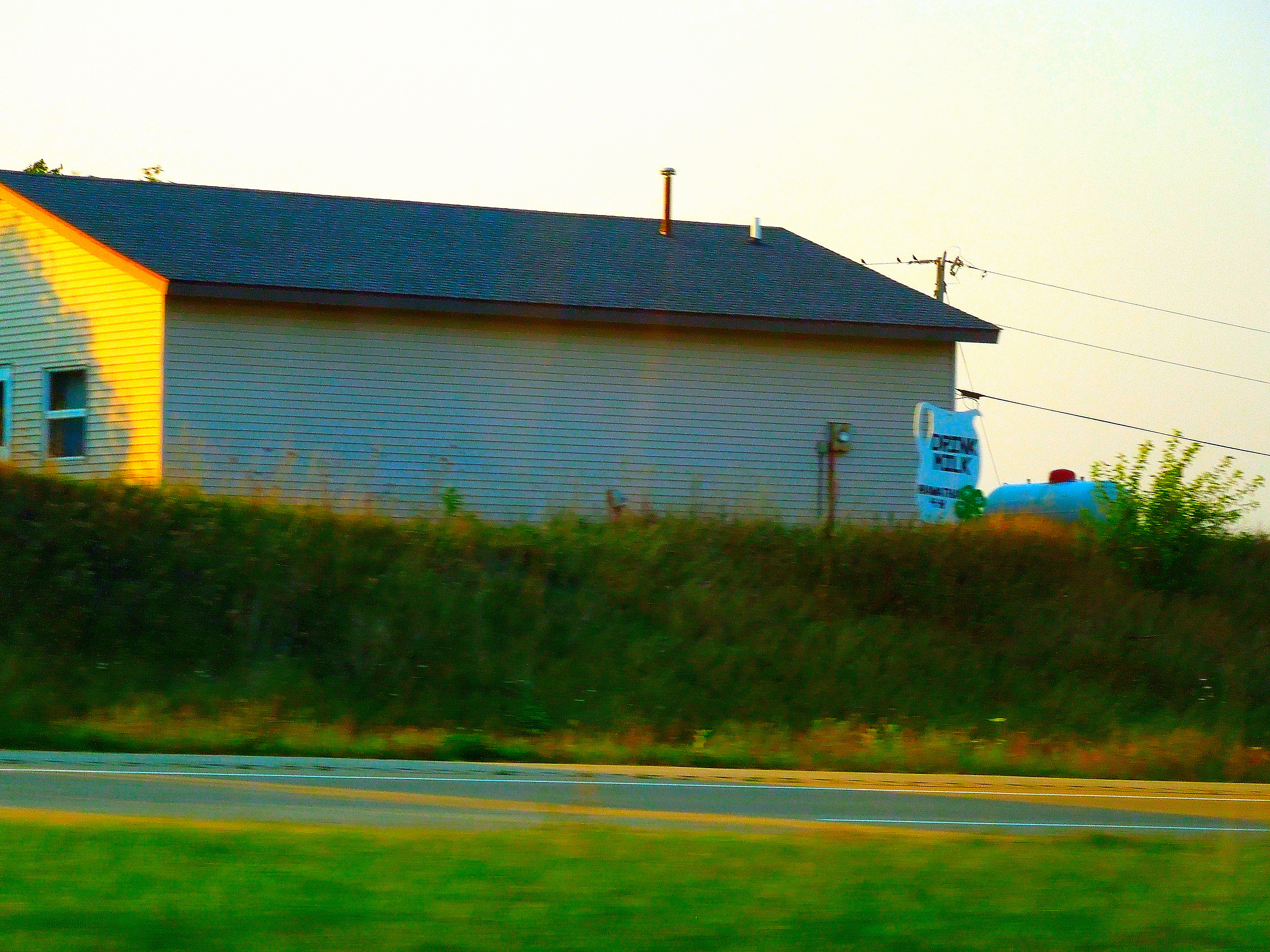
- Town hall

- Location in Green County and the state of Wisconsin.
- Coordinates: 42°38′33″N 89°39′15″W
- Country: United States
- State: Wisconsin
- County: Green

Area
  - Total: 33.1 sq mi (85.6 km^{2})
  - Land: 33.1 sq mi (85.6 km^{2})
  - Water: 0 sq mi (0.0 km^{2})
- Elevation: 988 ft (301 m)

Population (2020)
  - Total: 1,291
  - Density: 39.1/sq mi (15.1/km^{2})
- Time zone: UTC-6 (Central (CST))
  - Summer (DST): UTC-5 (CDT)
- Area code: 608
- FIPS code: 55-53775
- GNIS feature ID: 1583741
- Website: https://townofmonroewi.gov/

Monroe is a town in Green County, Wisconsin, United States. The population was 1,291 at the 2020 census. The City of Monroe is located partially within the town. The unincorporated community of Stearns is also located in the town.

== Geography ==
According to the United States Census Bureau, the town has a total area of 33.0 square miles (85.6 km^{2}), of which 33.0 square miles (85.6 km^{2}) is land and 0.03% is water.

== Demographics ==
As of the census of 2000, there were 1,142 people, 358 households, and 303 families residing in the town. The population density was 34.6 people per square mile (13.3/km^{2}). There were 369 housing units at an average density of 11.2 per square mile (4.3/km^{2}). The racial makeup of the town was 99.21% White, 0.35% Black or African American, 0.09% Asian, and 0.35% from two or more races. 0.18% of the population were Hispanic or Latino of any race.

There were 358 households, out of which 38.8% had children under the age of 18 living with them, 77.4% were married couples living together, 3.9% had a female householder with no husband present, and 15.1% were non-families. 11.2% of all households were made up of individuals, and 4.2% had someone living alone who was 65 years of age or older. The average household size was 2.83 and the average family size was 3.04.

In the town, the population was spread out, with 24.7% under the age of 18, 5.0% from 18 to 24, 25.5% from 25 to 44, 25.4% from 45 to 64, and 19.4% who were 65 years of age or older. The median age was 42 years. For every 100 females, there were 91.9 males. For every 100 females age 18 and over, there were 90.3 males.

The median income for a household in the town was $55,625, and the median income for a family was $60,833. Males had a median income of $33,750 versus $25,192 for females. The per capita income for the town was $20,204. About 1.4% of families and 3.3% of the population were below the poverty line, including 2.2% of those under age 18 and 13.0% of those age 65 or over.

== Notable people ==
- Joshua H. Berkey (1852–1911), Christian minister and prohibitionist publisher
