= Decatur, Wisconsin =

- Town
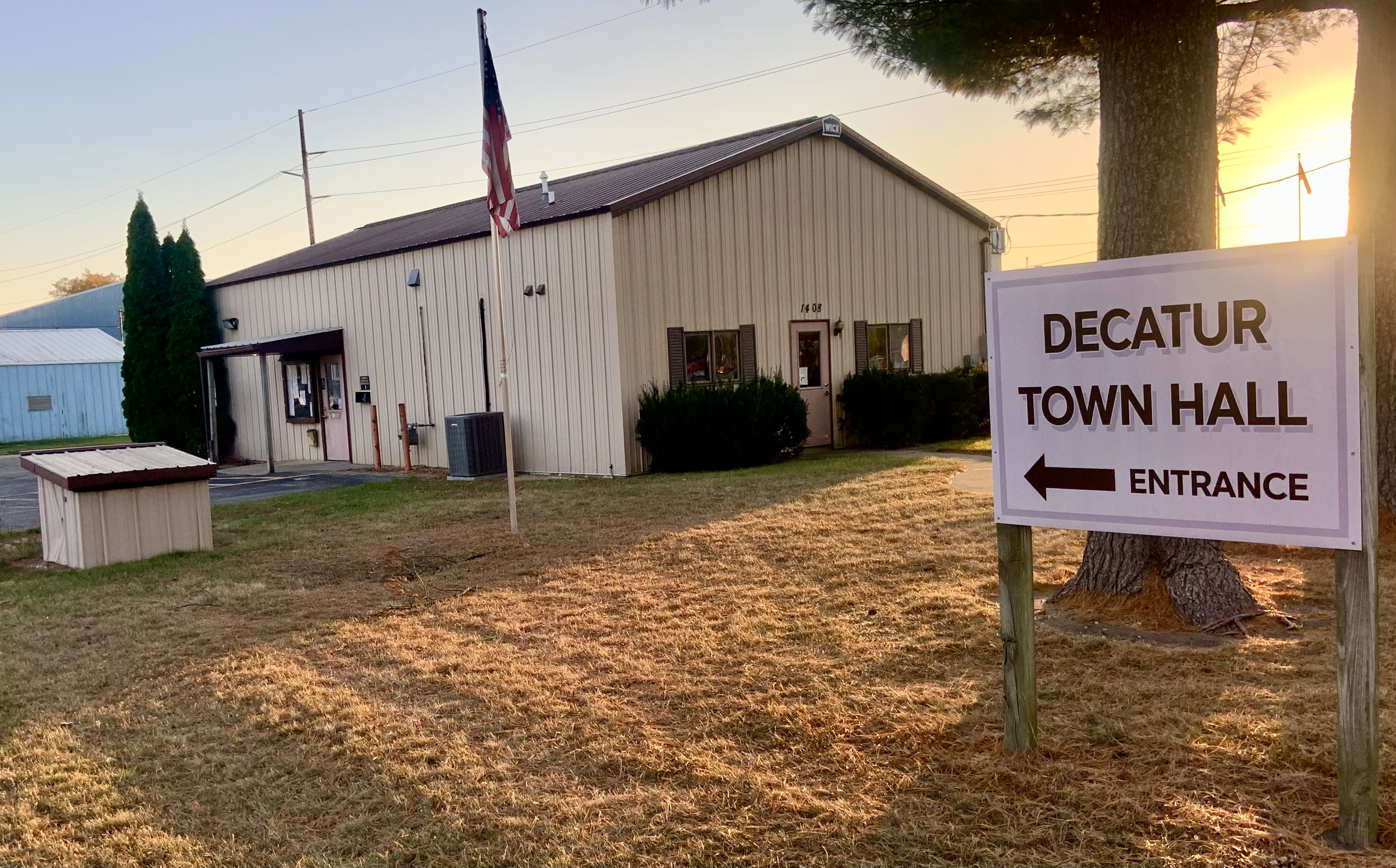
- Town hall in Brodhead

- Location in Green County and the state of Wisconsin.
- Coordinates: 42°38′37″N 89°25′41″W
- Country: United States
- State: Wisconsin
- County: Green

Area
  - Total: 34.4 sq mi (89.1 km^{2})
  - Land: 34.2 sq mi (88.6 km^{2})
  - Water: 0.19 sq mi (0.5 km^{2})
- Elevation: 879 ft (268 m)

Population (2020)
  - Total: 1,685
  - Density: 49.3/sq mi (19.0/km^{2})
- Time zone: UTC-6 (Central (CST))
  - Summer (DST): UTC-5 (CDT)
- Area code: 608
- FIPS code: 55-19075
- GNIS feature ID: 1583057
- Website: https://townofdecaturwi.gov/

Decatur is a town in Green County, Wisconsin, United States. The population was 1,685 at the 2020 census.

== Geography ==
According to the United States Census Bureau, the town has a total area of 34.4 square miles (89.0 km^{2}), of which 34.2 square miles (88.6 km^{2}) is land and 0.2 square mile (0.5 km^{2}) (0.55%) is water.

== Demographics ==
As of the census of 2000, there were 1,688 people, 587 households, and 501 families residing in the town. The population density was 49.4 people per square mile (19.1/km^{2}). There were 645 housing units at an average density of 18.9 per square mile (7.3/km^{2}). The racial makeup of the town was 97.69% White, 0.18% African American, 0.47% Native American, 0.18% Asian, 0.30% from other races, and 1.18% from two or more races. Hispanic or Latino of any race were 1.36% of the population.

There were 587 households, out of which 40.5% had children under the age of 18 living with them, 76.0% were married couples living together, 5.3% had a female householder with no husband present, and 14.5% were non-families. 10.7% of all households were made up of individuals, and 4.1% had someone living alone who was 65 years of age or older. The average household size was 2.86 and the average family size was 3.09.

In the town, the population was spread out, with 29.3% under the age of 18, 6.1% from 18 to 24, 30.7% from 25 to 44, 23.5% from 45 to 64, and 10.4% who were 65 years of age or older. The median age was 36 years. For every 100 females, there were 104.4 males. For every 100 females age 18 and over, there were 104.8 males.

The median income for a household in the town was $50,809, and the median income for a family was $52,500. Males had a median income of $36,385 versus $25,052 for females. The per capita income for the town was $19,482. About 4.0% of families and 5.1% of the population were below the poverty line, including 6.8% of those under age 18 and 3.4% of those age 65 or over.
