= Mount Pleasant, Green County, Wisconsin =

Mount Pleasant, Wisconsin
- Town
- Location in Green County and the state of Wisconsin.
- Coordinates: 42°43′18″N 89°33′18″W
- Country: United States
- State: Wisconsin
- County: Green

Area
  - Total: 34.3 sq mi (88.8 km^{2})
  - Land: 34.3 sq mi (88.8 km^{2})
  - Water: 0 sq mi (0.0 km^{2})
- Elevation: 814 ft (248 m)

Population (2020)
  - Total: 619
  - Density: 18.1/sq mi (6.97/km^{2})
- Time zone: UTC-6 (Central (CST))
  - Summer (DST): UTC-5 (CDT)
- Area code: 608
- FIPS code: 55-54850
- GNIS feature ID: 1583766
- Website: https://www.townofmtpleasantwi.gov/

There is also the Village of Mount Pleasant in Racine County.

Mount Pleasant is a town in Green County, Wisconsin, in the United States. As of the 2020 census, its population was 619. The unincorporated community of Schultz is located partially in the town.

== Geography ==
According to the United States Census Bureau, the town has a total area of 34.3 square miles (88.8 km^{2}), all land.

== Demographics ==
As of the census of 2000, there were 547 people, 188 households, and 150 families residing in the town. The population density was 16.0 people per square mile (6.2/km^{2}). There were 193 housing units at an average density of 5.6 per square mile (2.2/km^{2}). The racial makeup of the town was 98.35% White, 0.73% Native American, and 0.91% from two or more races.

There were 188 households, out of which 41.0% had children under the age of 18 living with them, 69.7% were married couples living together, 4.8% had a female householder with no husband present, and 19.7% were non-families. 14.4% of all households were made up of individuals, and 4.8% had someone living alone who was 65 years of age or older. The average household size was 2.91 and the average family size was 3.25.

In the town, the population was spread out, with 31.4% under the age of 18, 5.9% from 18 to 24, 28.9% from 25 to 44, 23.9% from 45 to 64, and 9.9% who were 65 years of age or older. The median age was 35 years. For every 100 females, there were 107.2 males. For every 100 females age 18 and over, there were 110.7 males.

The median income for a household in the town was $57,656, and the median income for a family was $58,942. Males had a median income of $32,885 versus $26,250 for females. The per capita income for the town was $23,405. About 3.9% of families and 3.8% of the population were below the poverty line, including 5.1% of those under age 18 and none of those age 65 or over.
