= Green County, Wisconsin =

County in Wisconsin, United States

- County
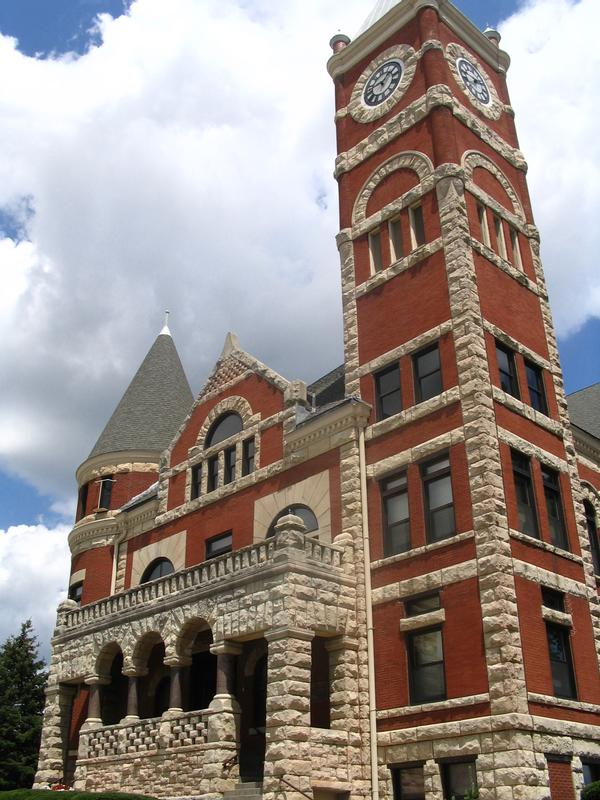
- Green County Courthouse

- Location within the U.S. state of Wisconsin
- Coordinates: 42°41′N 89°36′W
- Country: United States
- State: Wisconsin
- Founded: 1837
- Named for: Nathanael Greene
- Seat: Monroe
- Largest city: Monroe

Area
  - Total: 584 sq mi (1,510 km^{2})
  - Land: 584 sq mi (1,510 km^{2})
  - Water: 0.5 sq mi (1.3 km^{2}) 0.09%

Population (2020)
  - Total: 37,093
  - Estimate (2025): 37,227 ▲
  - Density: 63.5/sq mi (24.5/km^{2})
- Time zone: UTC−6 (Central)
  - Summer (DST): UTC−5 (CDT)
- Congressional district: 2nd
- Website: www.greencountywi.org

Green County is a county in the U.S. state of Wisconsin. As of the 2020 census, the population was 37,093. Its county seat is Monroe. Green County is included in the Madison, WI Metropolitan Statistical Area.

== History ==
Green County's land was long settled by Native Americans. In 1632, Samuel de Champlain included the area in the region belonging to the Illinois, and in the 18th century the Sauk mined lead within the present county limits. By the time the first white settlers arrived, all of Green County was the property of the Ho-Chunk, who called the mines the "Sac Diggings." The federal government recognized Indian title to frontier land, and generally forbade the private sale of Indian land to individuals. But as squatters continued to work the mines in southwestern Wisconsin, conflict arose between them and the Ho-Chunk, as well as the Sauk and Meskwaki, all of whom mined and sold lead. In 1832, when Black Hawk attempted to bring his people back to their former Illinois lands, they were pursued into Wisconsin, then known as western Michigan Territory. The Ho-Chunk were divided in the Black Hawk War, with many warriors siding with the Sauk and others taking personal revenge on frontier settlers in the lead mining district. Although many other Ho-Chunk aided the US army in pursuing the Sauk, they were coerced into selling their lands south of the Wisconsin River in a treaty signed in September, one month after Black Hawk's surrender.

Other towns had been founded in Wisconsin's lead region before the land cession, but Monroe, Wisconsin, was one of the many founded in the mid-1830s after this land legally opened to settlement.

The county was created in 1837 from the Wisconsin Territory. In December 1837, when a new county was to be split off from the over-large Iowa County, William Boyles of Monroe, as the Representative of the area, was allowed to choose a name. He chose Green County after the verdant color of the vegetation there. Another member suggested that it be modified to "Greene" after General Nathanael Greene, who commanded the Southern Campaign in the American Revolutionary War, but Boyles insisted on his original choice. The story that it was named for General Greene still persists in some circles.

== Geography ==
According to the U.S. Census Bureau, the county has an area of 584 square miles (1,510 km^{2}), of which 584 square miles (1,510 km^{2}) is land and 0.5 square miles (1.3 km^{2}) (0.09%) is water.

=== Major highways ===
- Highway 11 (Wisconsin)
- Highway 39 (Wisconsin)
- Highway 59 (Wisconsin)
- Highway 69 (Wisconsin)
- Highway 78 (Wisconsin)
- Highway 81 (Wisconsin)
- Highway 92 (Wisconsin)
- Highway 104 (Wisconsin)

=== Railroads ===
- Wisconsin and Southern Railroad

=== Airport ===
Monroe Municipal Airport (KEFT) serves the county and surrounding communities.

=== Adjacent counties ===
- Dane County – north
- Rock County – east
- Winnebago County, Illinois – southeast
- Stephenson County, Illinois – south
- Lafayette County – west
- Iowa County – northwest

== Demographics ==
Historical population
| Census | Pop. | Note | %± |
|---|---|---|---|
| 1840 | 933 | | — |
| 1850 | 8,566 | | 818.1% |
| 1860 | 19,808 | | 131.2% |
| 1870 | 23,611 | | 19.2% |
| 1880 | 21,729 | | −8.0% |
| 1890 | 22,732 | | 4.6% |
| 1900 | 22,719 | | −0.1% |
| 1910 | 21,641 | | −4.7% |
| 1920 | 21,568 | | −0.3% |
| 1930 | 21,870 | | 1.4% |
| 1940 | 23,146 | | 5.8% |
| 1950 | 24,172 | | 4.4% |
| 1960 | 25,851 | | 6.9% |
| 1970 | 26,714 | | 3.3% |
| 1980 | 30,012 | | 12.3% |
| 1990 | 30,339 | | 1.1% |
| 2000 | 33,647 | | 10.9% |
| 2010 | 36,842 | | 9.5% |
| 2020 | 37,093 | | 0.7% |
| 2025 (est.) | 37,227 | ▲ | 0.4% |
U.S. Decennial Census; 1790–1960 1900–1990; 1990–2000 2010 2020

=== Racial and ethnic composition ===
Green County, Wisconsin – Racial and ethnic composition Note: the US Census treats Hispanic/Latino as an ethnic category. This table excludes Latinos from the racial categories and assigns them to a separate category. Hispanics/Latinos may be of any race.
| Race / ethnicity (NH = Non-Hispanic) | Pop 1980 | Pop 1990 | Pop 2000 | Pop 2010 | Pop 2020 | % 1980 | % 1990 | % 2000 | % 2010 | % 2020 |
|---|---|---|---|---|---|---|---|---|---|---|
| White alone (NH) | 29,801 | 30,084 | 32,858 | 35,113 | 33,960 | 99.30% | 99.16% | 97.66% | 95.31% | 91.55% |
| Black or African American alone (NH) | 12 | 20 | 83 | 137 | 201 | 0.04% | 0.07% | 0.25% | 0.37% | 0.54% |
| Native American or Alaska Native alone (NH) | 25 | 48 | 66 | 50 | 49 | 0.08% | 0.16% | 0.20% | 0.14% | 0.13% |
| Asian alone (NH) | 61 | 64 | 97 | 197 | 170 | 0.20% | 0.21% | 0.29% | 0.53% | 0.46% |
| Native Hawaiian or Pacific Islander alone (NH) | x | x | 0 | 9 | 3 | x | x | 0.00% | 0.02% | 0.01% |
| Other race alone (NH) | 28 | 4 | 13 | 15 | 76 | 0.09% | 0.01% | 0.04% | 0.04% | 0.20% |
| Mixed race or Multiracial (NH) | x | x | 203 | 288 | 1,134 | x | x | 0.60% | 0.78% | 3.06% |
| Hispanic or Latino (any race) | 85 | 119 | 327 | 1,033 | 1,500 | 0.28% | 0.39% | 0.97% | 2.80% | 4.04% |
| Total | 30,012 | 30,339 | 33,647 | 36,842 | 37,093 | 100.00% | 100.00% | 100.00% | 100.00% | 100.00% |

=== 2020 census ===
As of the 2020 census, the population was 37,093, which yielded a population density of 63.5 people per square mile (24.5 people/km^{2}). There were 16,273 housing units at an average density of 27.9 units per square mile (10.8 units/km^{2}).

The median age was 43.7 years, with 22.2% of residents under the age of 18 and 20.1% of residents 65 years of age or older. For every 100 females there were 99.4 males, and for every 100 females age 18 and over there were 97.9 males age 18 and over.

The racial makeup of the county was 92.5% White, 0.6% Black or African American, 0.3% American Indian and Alaska Native, 0.5% Asian, <0.1% Native Hawaiian and Pacific Islander, 1.9% from some other race, and 4.3% from two or more races. Hispanic or Latino residents of any race comprised 4.0% of the population.

28.9% of residents lived in urban areas, while 71.1% lived in rural areas.

There were 15,404 households in the county, of which 27.6% had children under the age of 18 living in them. Of all households, 52.8% were married-couple households, 17.9% were households with a male householder and no spouse or partner present, and 21.4% were households with a female householder and no spouse or partner present. About 27.7% of all households were made up of individuals and 13.0% had someone living alone who was 65 years of age or older. There were 16,273 housing units, of which 5.3% were vacant. Among occupied housing units, 75.7% were owner-occupied and 24.3% were renter-occupied. The homeowner vacancy rate was 0.7% and the rental vacancy rate was 4.4%.

=== 2000 census ===
2000 Census Age Pyramid for Green County

As of the 2000 census, there were 33,647 people, 13,212 households, and 9,208 families residing in the county. The population density was 58 people per square mile (22 people/km^{2}). There were 13,878 housing units at an average density of 24 units per square mile (9.3 units/km^{2}). The racial makeup of the county was 98.14% White, 0.26% Black or African American, 0.21% Native American, 0.29% Asian, 0.36% from other races, and 0.75% from two or more races. 0.97% of the population were Hispanic or Latino of any race. 31.9% were of German, 20.3% Swiss, 14.9% Norwegian, 6.7% Irish, 5.7% English and 5.5% American ancestry. 96.5% spoke English, 2.0% German and 1.1% Spanish as their first language.

There were 13,212 households, out of which 33.70% had children under the age of 18 living with them, 58.30% were married couples living together, 7.50% had a female householder with no husband present, and 30.30% were non-families. 25.00% of all households were made up of individuals, and 11.20% had someone living alone who was 65 years of age or older. The average household size was 2.51 and the average family size was 3.01.

In the county, the population was spread out, with 26.50% under the age of 18, 6.70% from 18 to 24, 29.20% from 25 to 44, 22.90% from 45 to 64, and 14.70% who were 65 years of age or older. The median age was 38 years. For every 100 females there were 96.90 males. For every 100 females age 18 and over, there were 94.20 males.

As late as the 1970 federal census, Green County was the only county in the United States in which the largest foreign-born population was people born in Switzerland.

== Communities ==
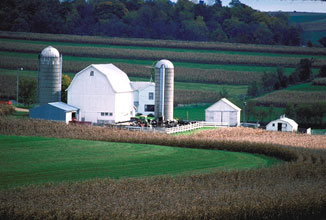
A farm in Green County, Wisconsin

=== Cities ===
- Brodhead (partly in Rock County)
- Monroe (county seat)

=== Villages ===
- Albany
- Belleville (mostly in Dane County)
- Brooklyn (mostly in Dane County)
- Browntown
- Monticello
- New Glarus

=== Towns ===
- Adams
- Albany
- Brooklyn
- Cadiz
- Clarno
- Decatur
- Exeter
- Jefferson
- Jordan
- Monroe
- Mount Pleasant
- New Glarus
- Spring Grove
- Sylvester
- Washington
- York

=== Census-designated place ===
- Juda

=== Unincorporated communities ===
- Attica
- Clarno
- Dayton
- Exeter
- Jordan Center
- Martintown
- Mineral Point
- Postville
- Oakley
- Ross Crossing
- Schneyville
- Schultz
- Stearns
- Twin Grove

=== Ghost towns/neighborhoods ===
- Clarence
- Farmers Grove
- Tyrone
- Willet

== Politics ==
United States presidential election results for Green County, Wisconsin
| Year | Republican | | Democratic | | Third party(ies) | |
| Year | No. | % | No. | % | No. | % |
|---|---|---|---|---|---|---|
| 1892 | 2,329 | 46.05% | 2,052 | 40.57% | 677 | 13.38% |
| 1896 | 3,093 | 54.72% | 2,339 | 41.38% | 220 | 3.89% |
| 1900 | 2,996 | 60.21% | 1,776 | 35.69% | 204 | 4.10% |
| 1904 | 2,992 | 62.05% | 1,466 | 30.40% | 364 | 7.55% |
| 1908 | 2,617 | 54.48% | 1,856 | 38.63% | 331 | 6.89% |
| 1912 | 1,601 | 38.82% | 1,716 | 41.61% | 807 | 19.57% |
| 1916 | 2,422 | 55.77% | 1,687 | 38.84% | 234 | 5.39% |
| 1920 | 5,466 | 84.68% | 633 | 9.81% | 356 | 5.52% |
| 1924 | 2,922 | 35.07% | 423 | 5.08% | 4,986 | 59.85% |
| 1928 | 5,152 | 64.18% | 2,812 | 35.03% | 63 | 0.78% |
| 1932 | 3,190 | 36.42% | 5,406 | 61.73% | 162 | 1.85% |
| 1936 | 3,700 | 37.53% | 5,941 | 60.26% | 218 | 2.21% |
| 1940 | 5,711 | 55.10% | 4,565 | 44.05% | 88 | 0.85% |
| 1944 | 5,556 | 57.28% | 4,101 | 42.28% | 42 | 0.43% |
| 1948 | 4,403 | 52.43% | 3,881 | 46.21% | 114 | 1.36% |
| 1952 | 7,949 | 70.46% | 3,326 | 29.48% | 6 | 0.05% |
| 1956 | 7,114 | 66.00% | 3,614 | 33.53% | 51 | 0.47% |
| 1960 | 7,939 | 67.79% | 3,766 | 32.16% | 6 | 0.05% |
| 1964 | 5,364 | 49.08% | 5,548 | 50.76% | 17 | 0.16% |
| 1968 | 6,502 | 61.03% | 3,501 | 32.86% | 651 | 6.11% |
| 1972 | 7,422 | 66.14% | 3,634 | 32.38% | 166 | 1.48% |
| 1976 | 7,085 | 54.31% | 5,632 | 43.17% | 329 | 2.52% |
| 1980 | 7,714 | 54.03% | 5,336 | 37.37% | 1,227 | 8.59% |
| 1984 | 7,827 | 63.65% | 4,367 | 35.52% | 102 | 0.83% |
| 1988 | 6,636 | 55.73% | 5,153 | 43.27% | 119 | 1.00% |
| 1992 | 4,887 | 34.46% | 5,467 | 38.55% | 3,829 | 27.00% |
| 1996 | 4,697 | 37.23% | 6,136 | 48.64% | 1,783 | 14.13% |
| 2000 | 6,790 | 44.45% | 7,863 | 51.47% | 623 | 4.08% |
| 2004 | 8,497 | 46.56% | 9,575 | 52.47% | 176 | 0.96% |
| 2008 | 6,730 | 36.31% | 11,502 | 62.06% | 302 | 1.63% |
| 2012 | 7,857 | 40.66% | 11,206 | 58.00% | 259 | 1.34% |
| 2016 | 8,693 | 45.79% | 9,122 | 48.05% | 1,170 | 6.16% |
| 2020 | 10,169 | 47.51% | 10,851 | 50.69% | 386 | 1.80% |
| 2024 | 10,843 | 49.12% | 10,903 | 49.39% | 330 | 1.49% |

Until the 1992 presidential election, Green County voters primarily backed the Republican Party nominee in national elections. Before that, the only times the GOP failed to win the county were in the midst of a divided party vote in 1912; the presence of Wisconsinite Robert La Follette on the ballot in 1924; and national Democratic Party landslides in 1932, 1936, and 1964.

Since 1992, the county has backed the Democratic nominee in every presidential election, although their margins of victory have often been narrow. In 2024, Kamala Harris won the county by 60 votes, the closest presidential election there since George H. W. Bush carried it in 1988.

== See also ==
- National Register of Historic Places listings in Green County, Wisconsin
