= Sylvester, Wisconsin =

- Town
- Location in Green County and the state of Wisconsin.
- Coordinates: 42°38′13″N 89°32′31″W
- Country: United States
- State: Wisconsin
- County: Green

Area
  - Total: 35.9 sq mi (93.0 km^{2})
  - Land: 35.9 sq mi (93.0 km^{2})
  - Water: 0 sq mi (0.0 km^{2})
- Elevation: 873 ft (266 m)

Population (2020)
  - Total: 1,001
  - Density: 27.9/sq mi (10.8/km^{2})
- Time zone: UTC-6 (Central (CST))
  - Summer (DST): UTC-5 (CDT)
- Area code: 608
- FIPS code: 55-78875
- GNIS feature ID: 1584264

Sylvester is a town in Green County, Wisconsin, United States. As of the 2020 census, the town population was 1,001.

== Geography ==
According to the United States Census Bureau, the town has a total area of 35.9 square miles (93.0 km^{2}), all land.

== Demographics ==
As of the census of 2000, there were 809 people, 289 households, and 243 families residing in the town. The population density was 22.5 people per square mile (8.7/km^{2}). There were 309 housing units at an average density of 8.6 per square mile (3.3/km^{2}). The racial makeup of the town was 97.03% White, 1.24% Asian, 0.25% from other races, and 1.48% from two or more races. Hispanic or Latino of any race were 0.12% of the population.

There were 289 households, out of which 38.4% had children under the age of 18 living with them, 78.5% were married couples living together, 3.1% had a female householder with no husband present, and 15.9% were non-families. 13.5% of all households were made up of individuals, and 3.8% had someone living alone who was 65 years of age or older. The average household size was 2.80 and the average family size was 3.06.

In the town, the population was spread out, with 29.5% under the age of 18, 3.5% from 18 to 24, 29.2% from 25 to 44, 26.8% from 45 to 64, and 11.0% who were 65 years of age or older. The median age was 39 years. For every 100 females, there were 101.2 males. For every 100 females age 18 and over, there were 102.1 males.

The median income for a household in the town was $52,917 and the median income for a family was $53,828. Males had a median income of $37,396 versus $23,500 for females. The per capita income for the town was $23,871. About 1.3% of families and 3.7% of the population were below the poverty line, including 7.5% of those under age 18 and none of those age 65 or over.
