= Brooklyn, Green County, Wisconsin =

Brooklyn, Wisconsin
- Town
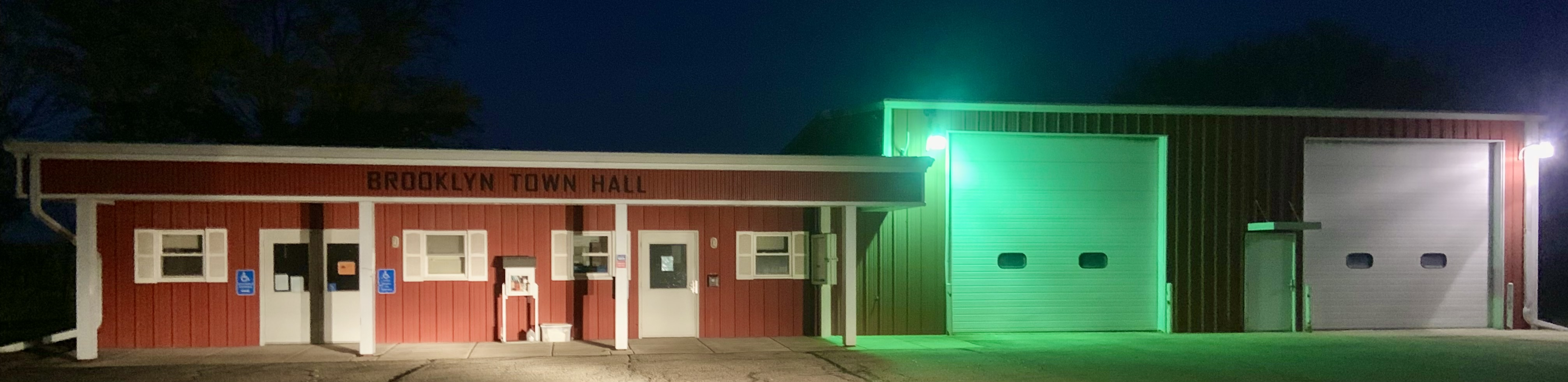
- Town hall

- Location in Green County and the state of Wisconsin.
- Coordinates: 42°48′29″N 89°25′57″W
- Country: United States
- State: Wisconsin
- County: Green

Area
  - Total: 35.5 sq mi (91.9 km^{2})
  - Land: 35.5 sq mi (91.9 km^{2})
  - Water: 0 sq mi (0.0 km^{2})
- Elevation: 1,014 ft (309 m)

Population (2020)
  - Total: 1,108
  - Density: 27/sq mi (10.3/km^{2})
- Time zone: UTC-6 (Central (CST))
  - Summer (DST): UTC-5 (CDT)
- Area code: 608
- FIPS code: 55-10100
- GNIS feature ID: 1582870

Brooklyn is a town in Green County, Wisconsin, United States. The population was 1,108 at the 2020 census. The unincorporated community of Attica is located in the town. Section one of the Town of Brooklyn contains the portion of the village of Brooklyn that lies in Green County.

== Geography ==
According to the United States Census Bureau, the town has a total area of 35.5 square miles (91.9 km^{2}), of which 35.5 square miles (91.9 km^{2}) is land and 0.03% is water.

== Demographics ==
=== 2010 census ===
As of the 2010 United States census, there were 1,083 people, 419 households, and 324 families living in the town.

=== 2000 census ===
As of the census of 2000, there were 944 people, 341 households, and 274 families living in the town. The population density was 26.6 people per square mile (10.3/km^{2}). There were 356 housing units at an average density of 10.0 per square mile (3.9/km^{2}). The racial makeup of the town was 98.31% White, 0.11% African American, 0.32% Native American, 0.11% Asian, 0.64% from other races, and 0.53% from two or more races. Hispanic or Latino of any race were 0.64% of the population.

There were 341 households, out of which 37.0% had children under the age of 18 living with them, 69.8% were married couples living together, 5.0% had a female householder with no husband present, and 19.6% were non-families. 14.4% of all households were made up of individuals, and 4.1% had someone living alone who was 65 years of age or older. The average household size was 2.77 and the average family size was 3.05.

In the town, the population was spread out, with 27.4% under the age of 18, 6.1% from 18 to 24, 31.8% from 25 to 44, 26.0% from 45 to 64, and 8.7% who were 65 years of age or older. The median age was 38 years. For every 100 females, there were 110.2 males. For every 100 females age 18 and over, there were 105.7 males.

The median income for a household in the town was $53,333, and the median income for a family was $56,750. Males had a median income of $35,833 versus $29,732 for females. The per capita income for the town was $21,458. About 2.9% of families and 2.7% of the population were below the poverty line, including none of those under age 18 and 10.1% of those age 65 or over.

== Notable people ==
- Fordyce R. Melvin, Wisconsin State Representative, farmer, and businessman, lived in the town
