= Adams, Green County, Wisconsin =

Town of Adams
- Town
- Location of the Town of Adams in Green County and the state of Wisconsin.
- Coordinates: 42°43′13″N 89°45′48″W
- Country: United States
- State: Wisconsin
- County: Green

Area
  - Total: 36.2 sq mi (93.7 km^{2})
  - Land: 36.2 sq mi (93.7 km^{2})
  - Water: 0 sq mi (0.0 km^{2})
- Elevation: 843 ft (257 m)

Population (2020)
  - Total: 540
  - Density: 15/sq mi (5.8/km^{2})
- Time zone: UTC-6 (Central (CST))
  - Summer (DST): UTC-5 (CDT)
- Area code: 608
- FIPS code: 55-00325
- GNIS feature ID: 1582655

The Town of Adams is located in Green County, Wisconsin, United States. The population was 540 at the 2020 Census. Willet, now a ghost town, was located in Adams.

== History ==
The earliest settlers were Cornish lead miners; they were followed by settlers from New England, Ireland, Switzerland and Norway. The town has been the home of a Lutheran parish. Adams Lutheran Church, Evangelical Lutheran Church in America (ELCA), was formed by Norwegian immigrants from the Valdres and Hadeland areas of Norway and was originally served by clergy of the Church of Norway. It later became a member of the Conference of the Norwegian-Danish Evangelical Lutheran Church of America. Under the increasing influence of the Haugean pietist movement among Norwegian American clergy and parishes, it joined a group originally called the Friends of Augsburg, which subsequently became the Lutheran Free Church. Later, when it began to call its pastors from clergy of The American Lutheran Church, it became a member of that body. It became a member of the ELCA when the American Lutheran Church merged with two other Lutheran synods.

The original church was built by the first parishioners during the American Civil War from limestone quarried from a site below the ridge on which the church stood. Later, the inside walls of the sanctuary were covered with a darkly varnished wooden wainscoting) of a very distinctive herringbone pattern. After serving the parish for almost a century and a half, the church burned and a new one was built on a site immediately adjacent to the original within a year.

== Geography ==
According to the United States Census Bureau, the town has a total area of 36.2 square miles (93.7 km^{2}), all land.

== Demographics ==
As of the census of 2000, there were 464 people, 165 households, and 121 families residing in the town. The population density was 12.8 people per square mile (5.0/km^{2}). There were 180 housing units at an average density of 5.0 per square mile (1.9/km^{2}). The racial makeup of the town was 98.49% White, 0.86% African American, 0.22% Native American, and 0.43% from two or more races. Hispanic or Latino of any race were 0.22% of the population.

There were 165 households, out of which 37.0% had children under the age of 18 living with them, 70.3% were married couples living together, 1.8% had a female householder with no husband present, and 26.1% were non-families. 21.2% of all households were made up of individuals, and 6.1% had someone living alone who was 65 years of age or older. The average household size was 2.81 and the average family size was 3.30.

In the town, the population was spread out, with 28.4% under the age of 18, 7.1% from 18 to 24, 31.9% from 25 to 44, 23.3% from 45 to 64, and 9.3% who were 65 years of age or older. he median age was 35 years. For every 100 females, there were 108.1 males. For every 100 females age 18 and over, there were 117.0 males.

The median income for a household in the town was $46,731, and the median income for a family was $48,750. Males had a median income of $30,208 versus $24,688 for females. The per capita income for the town was $20,826. About 6.3% of families and 8.7% of the population were below the poverty line, including 15.6% of those under age 18 and 4.3% of those age 65 or over.
