= Clarno, Wisconsin =

- Township
- Location in Green County and the state of Wisconsin.
- Coordinates: 42°32′46″N 89°39′19″W
- Country: United States
- State: Wisconsin
- County: Green

Area
  - Total: 36.5 sq mi (94.6 km^{2})
  - Land: 36.5 sq mi (94.6 km^{2})
  - Water: 0 sq mi (0.0 km^{2})
- Elevation: 925 ft (282 m)

Population (2020)
  - Total: 1,133
  - Density: 31.0/sq mi (12.0/km^{2})
- Time zone: UTC-6 (Central (CST))
  - Summer (DST): UTC-5 (CDT)
- Area code: 608
- FIPS code: 55-15000
- GNIS feature ID: 1582964
- Website: https://townofclarno.com/

Clarno is a town in Green County, Wisconsin, United States. The population was 1,133 at the 2020 census. The unincorporated communities of Clarno and Schneyville are located in the town.

== Geography ==
According to the United States Census Bureau, the town has a total area of 36.5 square miles (94.6 km^{2}), all land.

== History ==
The town was named after early settler Andrew Clarno, who founded a farm there in 1829.

== Demographics ==
As of the census of 2000, there were 1,079 people, 393 households, and 303 families residing in the town. The population density was 29.5 people per square mile (11.4/km^{2}). There were 410 housing units at an average density of 11.2 per square mile (4.3/km^{2}). The racial makeup of the town was 98.70% White, 0.09% African American, 0.37% Asian, and 0.83% from two or more races.

There were 393 households, out of which 35.9% had children under the age of 18 living with them, 69.2% were married couples living together, 4.8% had a female householder with no husband present, and 22.9% were non-families. 16.5% of all households were made up of individuals, and 5.6% had someone living alone who was 65 years of age or older. The average household size was 2.72 and the average family size was 3.06.

In the town, the population was spread out, with 27.2% under the age of 18, 7.1% from 18 to 24, 28.7% from 25 to 44, 25.5% from 45 to 64, and 11.5% who were 65 years of age or older. The median age was 38 years. For every 100 females, there were 102.1 males. For every 100 females age 18 and over, there were 106.8 males.

The median income for a household in the town was $47,167, and the median income for a family was $50,234. Males had a median income of $33,250 versus $21,250 for females. The per capita income for the town was $20,500. About 4.7% of families and 7.0% of the population were below the poverty line, including 8.4% of those under age 18 and 2.2% of those age 65 or over.
