= Brooklyn (village), Wisconsin =

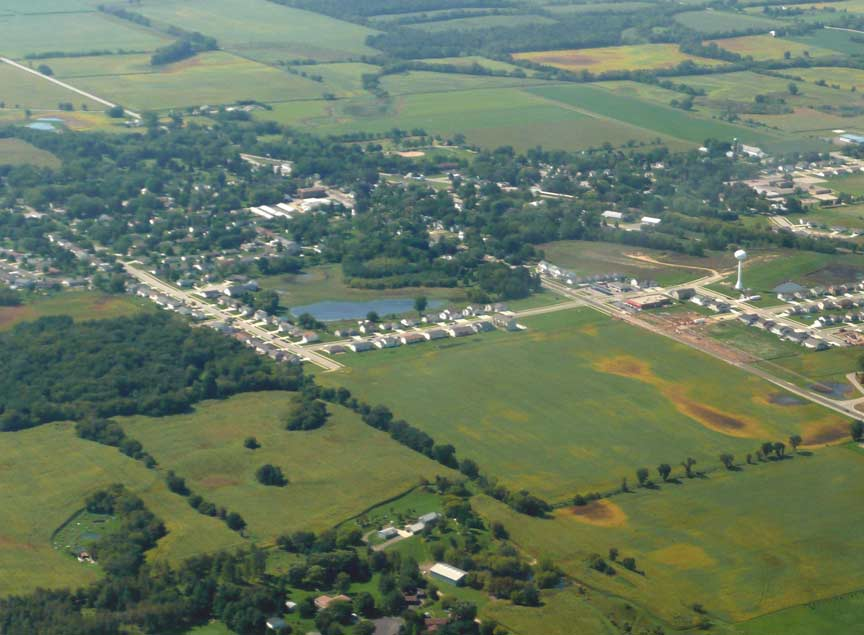

- Location of Brooklyn in Dane and Green Counties, Wisconsin.

- Location within Wisconsin Location within the United States
- Coordinates: 42°51′13″N 89°22′11″W
- Country: United States
- State: Wisconsin
- County: Dane; Green

Area
  - Total: 1.12 sq mi (2.90 km^{2})
  - Land: 1.12 sq mi (2.89 km^{2})
  - Water: 0.0039 sq mi (0.01 km^{2})

Population (2020)
  - Total: 1,524
  - Density: 1,366/sq mi (527.3/km^{2})
- FIPS code: 55-10075
- GNIS feature ID: 1582869
- Website: brooklynwi.gov

Brooklyn is a village in Dane and Green counties in Wisconsin, United States. The population was 1,524 at the 2020 census, with 1,026 residents in Dane County and 498 in Green County.

The Dane County portion of Brooklyn is part of the Madison, Wisconsin metropolitan area, while the Green County portion is part of the Monroe Micropolitan Statistical Area.

== History ==
The village was incorporated in 1905. It was named after Brooklyn, New York.

== Geography ==
According to the United States Census Bureau, the village has a total area of 1.12 square miles (2.90 km^{2}), all land.

The village straddles the boundary between the Sugar-Pecatonica river basin (Allen Creek and Middle Sugar River watershed) draining to the west, and Lower Rock river basin (Badfish Creek watershed) draining to the east.

== Demographics ==
Historical population
Census	Pop.	Note	%±
1910	362		—
1920	407		12.4%
1930	406		−0.2%
1940	449		10.6%
1950	479		6.7%
1960	590		23.2%
1970	565		−4.2%
1980	627		11.0%
1990	789		25.8%
2000	916		16.1%
2010	1,401		52.9%
2020	1,524		8.8%
U.S. Decennial Census

=== 2020 census ===
As of the census of 2020, the population was 1,524. The population density was 1,365.6 inhabitants per square mile (527.3/km^{2}). There were 558 housing units at an average density of 500.0 units per square mile (193.1 units/km^{2}). The racial makeup of the village was 88.7% White, 2.2% Black or African American, 0.3% Asian, 0.2% Native American, 0.1% Pacific Islander, 1.6% from other races, and 7.0% from two or more races. Ethnically, the population was 5.2% Hispanic or Latino of any race.

=== Young population ===
Brooklyn has gained and maintained a population of young adults at an above-average rate. According to a 2017 case study by the University of Wisconsin-Madison, young adults have cited Brooklyn's affordable housing, high-quality local schools, proximity to both Madison and Janesville, and "small-town feel" with a "sense of safety and community" as reasons why they had chosen to live in Brooklyn.

=== 2010 census ===
As of the census of 2010, there were 1,401 people, 508 households, and 391 families living in the village. The population density was 1,285.3 inhabitants per square mile (496.3/km^{2}). There were 527 housing units at an average density of 483.5 units per square mile (186.7 units/km^{2}). The racial makeup of the village was 95.1% White, 2.0% African American, 0.1% Native American, 0.6% Asian, 1.1% from other races, and 1.1% from two or more races. Hispanic or Latino of any race were 5.9% of the population.

There were 508 households, of which 46.1% had children under the age of 18 living with them, 60.4% were married couples living together, 9.6% had a female householder with no husband present, 6.9% had a male householder with no wife present, and 23.0% were non-families. 15.9% of all households were made up of individuals, and 5.3% had someone living alone who was 65 years of age or older. The average household size was 2.76 and the average family size was 3.11.

The median age in the village was 32.8 years. 30% of residents were under the age of 18; 6.3% were between the ages of 18 and 24; 34.9% were from 25 to 44; 23.4% were from 45 to 64; and 5.6% were 65 years of age or older. The gender makeup of the village was 50.4% male and 49.6% female.

=== 2000 census ===
As of the census of 2000, there were 916 people, 343 households, and 255 families living in the village. The population density was 837.4 people per square mile (323.3 people/km^{2}). There were 351 housing units at an average density of 320.9 units per square mile (123.9 units/km^{2}). The racial makeup of the village was 98.25% White, 0.22% African American, 0.44% Asian, 0.33% from other races, and 0.76% from two or more races. Hispanic or Latino of any race were 1.42% of the population.

There were 343 households, out of which 43.1% had children under the age of 18 living with them, 60.3% were married couples living together, 9.0% had a female householder with no husband present, and 25.4% were non-families. 18.7% of all households were made up of individuals, and 8.7% had someone living alone who was 65 years of age or older. The average household size was 2.67 and the average family size was 3.08.

In the village, the population was spread out, with 30.1% under the age of 18, 5.9% from 18 to 24, 39.0% from 25 to 44, 16.6% from 45 to 64, and 8.4% who were 65 years of age or older. The median age was 33 years. For every 100 females, there were 104.0 males. For every 100 females age 18 and over, there were 104.5 males.

The median income for a household in the village was $48,056, and the median income for a family was $51,607. Males had a median income of $34,934 versus $25,893 for females. The per capita income for the village was $19,480. About 1.1% of families and 2.9% of the population were below the poverty line, including 1.5% of those under age 18 and 18.2% of those age 65 or over.

== Parks and recreation ==
There are three parks in the village—Smithfield Park on the eastern side, Legion Park on the southern side, and Water Tower Park on the northern side. Smithfield Park contains a basketball court, a picnic pavilion, public lavatories with drinking fountains, and a playground.

== Government ==
The village is governed by a seven-member board of trustees, one of whom serves as the village president. Each trustee is elected in a village-wide race.

== Education ==
Brooklyn Elementary School, a public school, is part of the Oregon School District.

== Infrastructure ==
=== Transportation ===
==== Roads ====
Wisconsin state highways 92 and 104 intersect in the village. Dane county highway MM terminates at that intersection.

==== Railways ====
The Beloit and Madison Railroad was built through the village in the 1800s before being acquired by the Chicago and North Western railway. From 1880 to the early 1950s the line was double tracked. The line was abandoned in 1996 and sold to the cities of Oregon and Fitchburg. It still exists but is out of service.

== See also ==
- List of villages in Wisconsin
