= Giordano's =

American pizzeria chain based in Chicago

Coordinates: 41.87798°N 87.63477°W

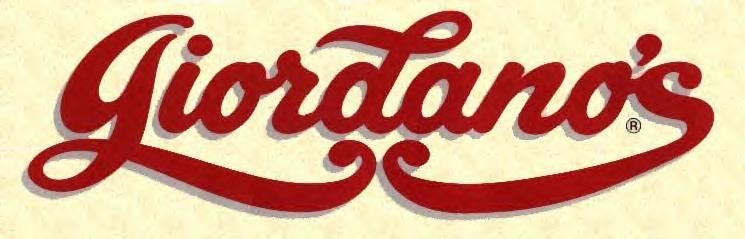
- Type: Private
- Industry: Restaurant
- Founded: February 1974; 52 years ago
- Founder: Efren Boglio; Joseph Boglio
- Headquarters: Chicago, Illinois, U.S., United States
- Number of locations: 56
- Area served: Colorado, Florida, Illinois, Indiana, Iowa, Minnesota, Ohio, Nevada, Washington, D.C., and Wisconsin
- Key people: Nick Scarpino (Chief Executive Officer); Yorgo Koutsogiorgas (CEO, 2011-2024)
- Website: giordanos.com

Giordano's is an American pizzeria chain that specializes in Chicago-style stuffed and deep-dish pizza. Brothers Efren and Joseph Boglio founded Giordano's in 1974 in Chicago, Illinois. The pizzeria has since expanded to 56 locations in Colorado, Florida, Indiana, Iowa, Minnesota, Ohio, Nevada, Washington, D.C., and Wisconsin. The chain has also expanded to offer catering and ship frozen pizzas in the United States.

== History ==
Brothers Efren and Joseph Boglio were born in a small town near Turin, Italy, where their mother was known for the quality of her recipes. Her family was most fond of her Easter pizza pies. The brothers emigrated first to Argentina and subsequently (separately) to the U.S. Upon arriving in America, Efren began working at a pizzeria in Chicago, but he was not satisfied with the pizzas he tasted and decided to open his own restaurant, Roma. By his account, when Joseph came to Chicago, the two decided to open a restaurant using their mother's recipe and after experimenting over several months developed the stuffed pizza. In 1974, they founded Giordano's.

=== Challenges ===
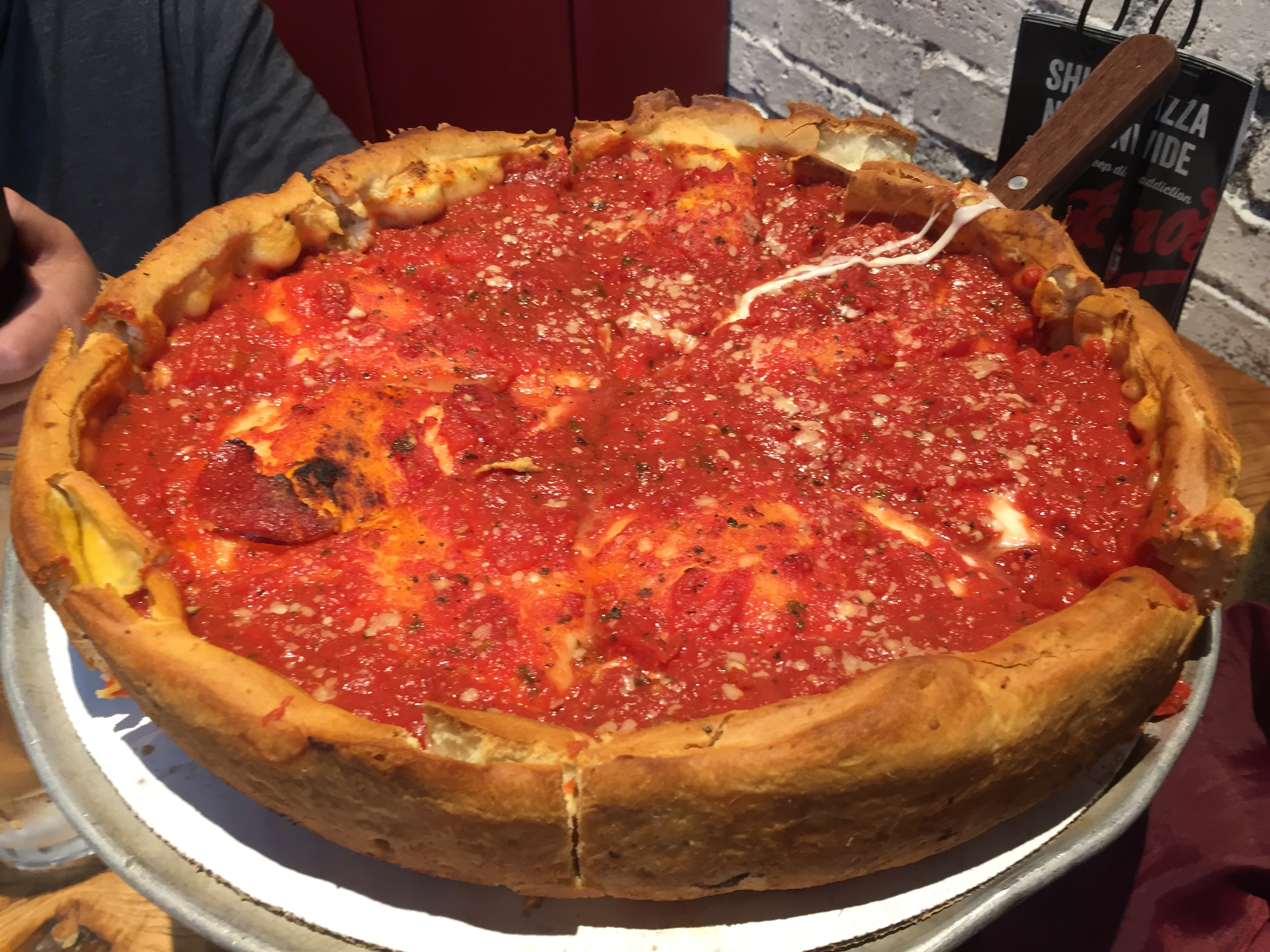
Deep-dish pizza from Giordano's in July 2018

Several commentators have questioned the restaurant's claim about the creation of the stuffed pizza, noting similarities with the origin story of Nancy's Pizza, which introduced its own stuffed pizza in the same year. Both chains claim to have based their pizza on a family recipe for scarciedda, an Easter dish common to Basilicata and Apulia, two regions of Italy. Some critics have posited a connection between the founders of the two pizza chains.

=== New ownership ===
John Apostolou, a native of Greece, together with his wife Eva, acquired Giordano's in 1988. In 1993 he told Crain's Chicago Business of their ambitions to expand the chain by opening over 100 new locations in the United States, Europe, and the Middle East, but failed to do so. Under Apostolou's stewardship, Giordano's opened a restaurant in Milwaukee in 1995 and planned for five more, but the Milwaukee location closed in 2002. The first major expansion outside Illinois began in 2005 when Giordano's opened locations in Florida.

=== Bankruptcy and resale ===
Faced with weak economic conditions, the Apostolou family struggled with leasing and selling their commercial real estate properties. Their firm, Randolph Partners LLC, eventually defaulted on its real estate loans on January 1, 2011, and filed for Chapter 11 bankruptcy on February 8, 2011. Having the same primary lender, Giordano's was included in the proceedings along with over 30 affiliate companies. Overall, the companies listed nearly $50 million in combined liabilities to Fifth Third Bank and $2 million to two additional banks and were able to obtain emergency financing in order to stay in operation. While Giordano's entered bankruptcy at a time when many other restaurant chains and pizzerias were being forced to re-organize due to faltering sales, the company's bankruptcy attorney, Michael Gesas, assuaged concerns about the chain's viability and stated that real estate was the reason for the bankruptcy.

After the bankruptcy, four Giordano's restaurants closed as the result of the ensuing legal battles. John Apostolou complicated matters when he challenged the proceedings by filing pseudolegal documents that had been prepared by a sovereign citizen ideologue. The company's bankruptcy lawyer withdrew from the case as a result, and the bankruptcy court responded by barring Apostolou from entering the company's headquarters as well as any of its restaurants. John and Eva Apostolou eventually sold the business for $52 million to Chicago private-equity firm Victory Park Capital Advisors LLC. Ultimately, the firm — which was indebted for approximately $52 million — was auctioned off in November 2011 for $61.6 million to a group including private equity firms Victory Park, Origin Capital, and Atria Group, and George and Bill Apostolou (the sons of John and Eva Apostolou, who owned Giordano's prior to bankruptcy.)

== Locations ==
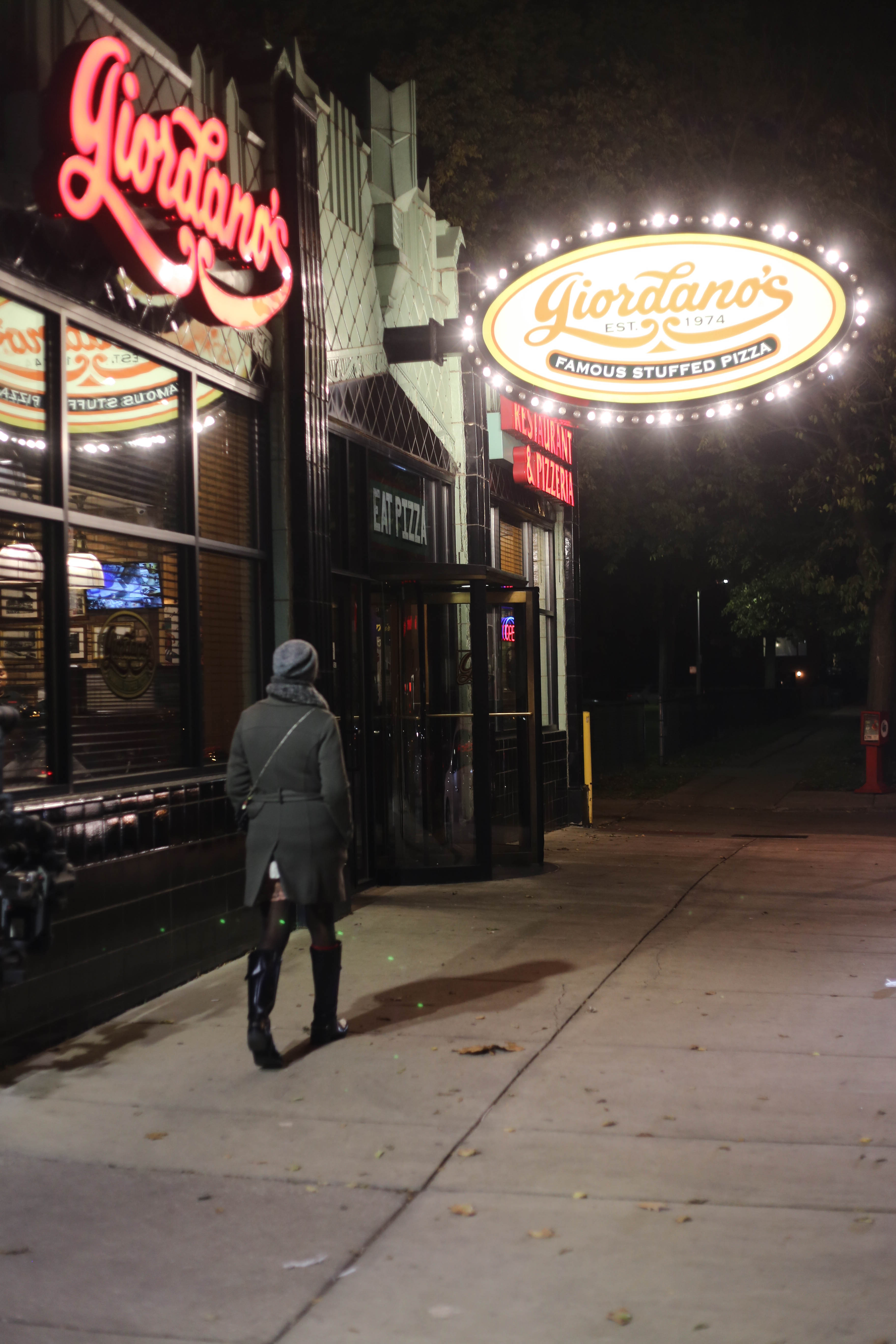
A Giordano's restaurant at night in 2017

Prior to filing for bankruptcy, Giordano's had 13 restaurants in Chicago and another 30 in the Chicago metropolitan area. The firm opened its first locations outside of Illinois in northern and central Florida in 2005. Early Florida locations were opened in Lake Buena Vista and Kissimmee. By October 2007, Giordano's had opened stores in Port Richey, Brandon, and Tampa. In February 2015, Giordano's opened a new restaurant in Indianapolis, its second Indiana location after Merrillville. In July 2015, Giordano's made its entry into the Minnesota market, opening a restaurant in the Uptown area of Minneapolis. In April 2018, Giordano's announced a planned restaurant in Omaha, Nebraska.

Today there are 15 Giordano's restaurants in the Chicago area and more elsewhere. Three, in Florida, are owned by franchisees. As of May 2026, outside of Illinois, Giordano's had locations in Colorado, Florida, Indiana, Iowa, Minnesota, Ohio, Nevada, Washington, D.C., and Wisconsin.

== Competition ==
Giordano's is one of the most famous of Chicago's pizzerias, and its major competitors in the Chicago-style deep dish field are Pizzeria Uno, Nancy's, Gino's East, Pizano's, and Lou Malnati's, while its thin crust pizza competes primarily with Home Run Inn, Connie's, Aurelio's and Rosati's. Along with Uno and Gino's, Giordano's has been described as one of Chicago's "main pizza triumvirate".

== Fare ==
The stuffed pizza at Giordano's has a top and bottom crust with cheese stuffed in between and the option of additional toppings in the middle such as pepperoni, Italian sausage, and spinach, while sauce and parmesan are added on top of the crust. Giordano's pizza crust is made from dough high in gluten, which takes several days to prepare. The crust has been described as being soft and flaky, while not having much flavor, with the shape being in the traditional Chicago-style.

== Reception ==
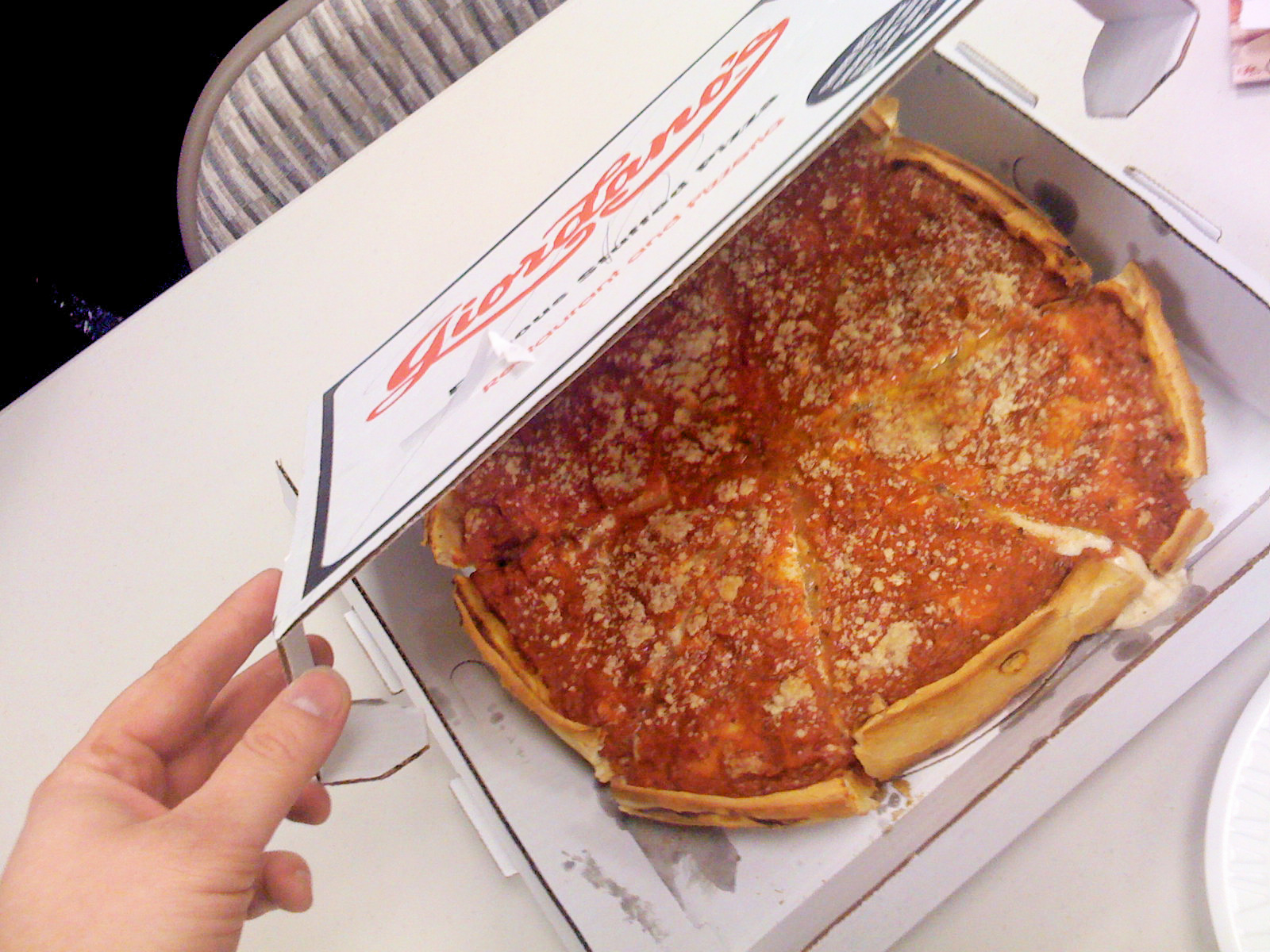
A freshly delivered stuffed pizza.

Giordano's stuffed pizza has received wide acclaim from critics, being named "Best Pizza in the City" by Chicago Magazine and "Best Pizza in America" by NBC's The Today Show. On Serious Eats, Daniel Zemans, praised the sauce used in the stuffed pizza for having a strong tomato and herb flavor, while noting the crust as a less enthusing yet suitable element of the pizza. Denise Du Vernay, in a review of several Chicago-area pizzerias for Patch.com, described the stuffed pizza at Giordano's as "perfect" and superior to the stuffed pizza offered at Aurelio's Pizza. In an article for the Christian Science Monitor, Giordano's was listed at fourth in a ranking of pizzerias in the Chicago area, with the article praising its stuffed pizza. The Rough Guide to Chicago said in 2003, "Although most pizza parlors offer deep-dish, the following places have perfected it: Pizzeria Uno, Lou Malnati's ..., and Giordano's." One criticism raised about the pizza is the time it takes for the pizza to cook, with a stuffed pizza having an average preparation time of up to 45 minutes. Diners can shorten this waiting period by ordering ahead or taking a half-baked pizza so they can finish baking it in their home oven.
