= Malnati =

Malnati is a surname of Italian origin. Notable people with the surname include:

- Linda Malnati (1855–1921), Italian women's rights activist, trade unionist, suffragist, pacifist and educator
- Marc Malnati, American restaurateur, businessman, and philanthropist
- Peter Malnati (born 1987), American golfer

== See also ==
- Lou Malnati's Pizzeria
