= Aurelio's Pizza =

American pizza restaurant chain

Aurelio's Pizza Inc.

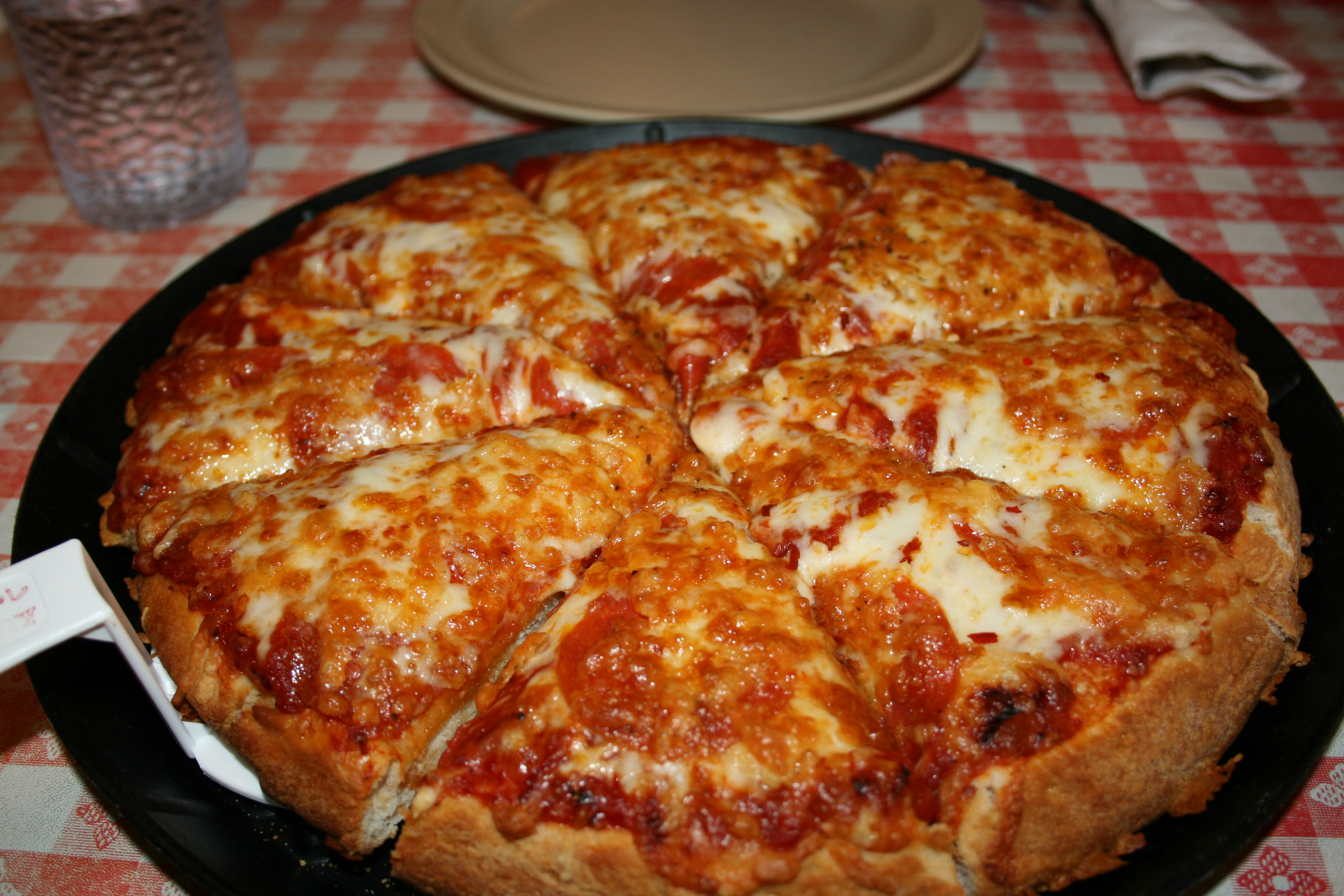
- A pepperoni pizza from Aurelio's
- Type: Franchised
- Industry: Restaurants, Pizza
- Founded: 1959; 67 years ago in Homewood, Illinois
- Headquarters: Homewood, Illinois, USA
- Website: www.aureliospizza.com

Aurelio's Pizza is an Illinois restaurant chain which centers its business around the thin crust variety of Chicago-style pizza. Aurelio's Pizza has three corporate owned stores and 37 franchised locations in six states. Aurelio's Pizza is the oldest Chicago pizza franchise restaurant, franchising since 1974.

== History ==
James Aurelio founded Macomb, Illinois' first pizza restaurant, The Italian Village, in 1952. In the mid-1950s, one of James' nephews, Joe Aurelio Jr., came to Macomb to work in the restaurant. Joe eventually moved back home to the Chicago area in 1959 and his cousin Louis Gaetano became co-owner of The Italian Village.

Joe then founded his own pizza restaurant, named Aurelio's. This was a small, four table restaurant on Ridge Rd. in Homewood. Both Aurelios specialized in a distinctive thin crust pizza that was sliced in "Chicago style" square pieces. The company's slogan is "Aurelio's is Pizza!"

When James Aurelio died, Louis Gaetano sold The Italian Village and it became an Aurelio's Pizza franchise. The chain's main competitors are Rosati's Pizza, Nancy's Pizza, and Home Run Inn, as well as many smaller family-owned establishments. The son of James Aurelio, Larry Aurelio, subsequently started a new pizza chain named Larry A's.

The chain's specialties are its thin-crust pizza and "calabrese," known by most as a calzone.

== In popular culture ==
In May 2025, Aurelio's Pizza gained publicity through news reports about the newly-elected Pope Leo XIV (born Robert Francis Prevost) and his connections to his hometown of Chicago. The Prevost brothers have been longtime patrons of the restaurant. The chain published a 2024 photo showing the then-Cardinal with family and old friends at the original Aurelio's in Homewood, Illinois during a homecoming visit. Capitalizing on the publicity, Aurelio's revealed that they were trademarking "Pope-a-Roni" for a new pizza recipe.

== See also ==
- List of pizza chains of the United States
