= Marc Malnati =

American restaurateur and philanthropist

- Occupations: Restaurateur, businessman, philanthropist
- Known for: Lou Malnati's Pizzeria

Marc Malnati is an American restaurateur, businessman, and philanthropist. He is one of the owners of Lou Malnati's Pizzeria, a Chicago-style pizza chain founded by his parents in Lincolnwood, Illinois, in 1971. He is also co-chair of the Lou Malnati Cancer Research Foundation.

== Early life ==
Malnati is the son of Lou and Jean Malnati, and is of Italian descent. They opened the first Lou Malnati's Pizzeria in Lincolnwood in 1971. Lou Malnati died in 1978, and Marc Malnati joined the family business that year.

== Career ==
In 2013, Malnati appeared on The Daily Show after Jon Stewart mocked Chicago deep-dish pizza. Eater Chicago said the appearance produced a "truce of sorts". In a 2024 retrospective, the publication revisited the exchange as part of what it called Chicago's "pizza war" with Stewart.

By 2016, Nation's Restaurant News described Malnati as the owner of Lou Malnati's Pizzeria. That year, the company accepted an equity investment from BDT Capital Partners to finance growth beyond the Chicago area, while Malnati said he would remain involved in operations and leadership. In 2021, when Meritage Group acquired the stake previously held by BDT, Malnati said that he and his brother Rick remained the company's largest individual investors and owners. In 2025, when Lou Malnati's named Julie Younglove-Webb chief executive officer, Nation's Restaurant News identified Malnati as the concept's owner and said the chain had expanded to more than 70 locations in the Chicago metropolitan area and in Arizona, Indiana, and Wisconsin.

In 2025, Malnati published Deep Dish: Inside the First 50 Years of Lou Malnati's Pizza.

== Philanthropy ==
Malnati is co-chair of the Lou Malnati Cancer Research Foundation and serves on the board of the Malnati Brain Tumor Institute at Northwestern Memorial Hospital. According to Northwestern Medicine, the family's charitable work began in 1971 with an annual benefit in memory of Brian Piccolo. After Lou Malnati's death in 1978, Jean Malnati and her sons Marc and Rick redirected the effort toward cancer research and treatment. In 2017, the foundation made a multimillion-dollar gift to the Brain Tumor Institute, which was subsequently renamed the Northwestern Medicine Lou and Jean Malnati Brain Tumor Institute of the Robert H. Lurie Comprehensive Cancer Center at Northwestern Memorial Hospital. By 2020, the Malnati family had given more than $4 million to cancer research, according to the Chicago Sun-Times.

== Honors ==
In 1995, Malnati and his brother Rick were named among Chicago magazine's "Chicagoans of the Year", alongside the minister Wayne Gordon.

== Selected bibliography ==
- Malnati, Marc (March 4, 2025). Deep Dish: Inside the First 50 Years of Lou Malnati's Pizza. Chicago: Agate Midway. ISBN 978-1-57284-355-4.
