= Exchange Square Historic District =

Historic district in Wisconsin, United States

- U.S. National Register of Historic Places
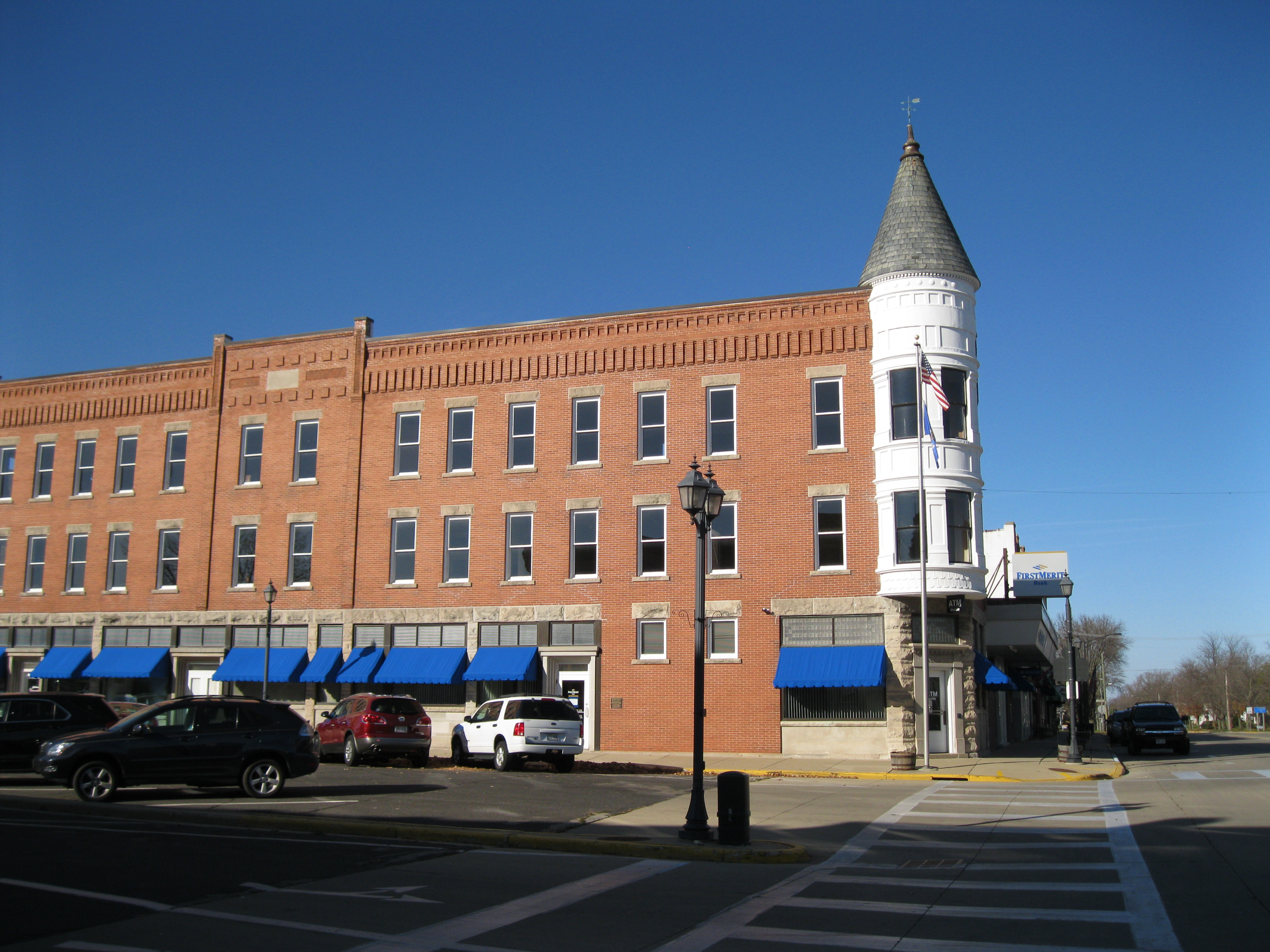
- The Laube Building, located in the district.

- Location within Wisconsin
- Location: Roughly bounded by 10th, RR tracks, E. 2nd and W. 3rd Aves., Brodhead, Wisconsin
- Coordinates: 42°37′11″N 89°22′37″W
- Area: 9 acres (3.6 ha)
- NRHP reference No.: 84000724
- Added to NRHP: November 15, 1984

The Exchange Square Historic District is a commercial historic district in downtown Brodhead, Wisconsin. The district contains thirty-eight buildings, thirty-five of which are considered contributing buildings to its historic character. Brodhead was platted as a railroad town in 1856 by the Milwaukee and Mississippi Railroad, and the oldest building in the district, the Farmer's Hotel, was completed the same year. The original railroad depot burned down, but its 1885 replacement still stands and is included in the district. Both Brodhead and its commercial district grew steadily through the late nineteenth and early twentieth centuries; every contributing building was completed by 1930. The district includes several examples of the Italianate and Queen Anne architectural styles, which were popular in the late nineteenth century, as well as many vernacular commercial buildings.

The district was listed on the National Register of Historic Places in 1984 and on the State Register of Historic Places in 1989.
