= Woodridge, Illinois =

- Village
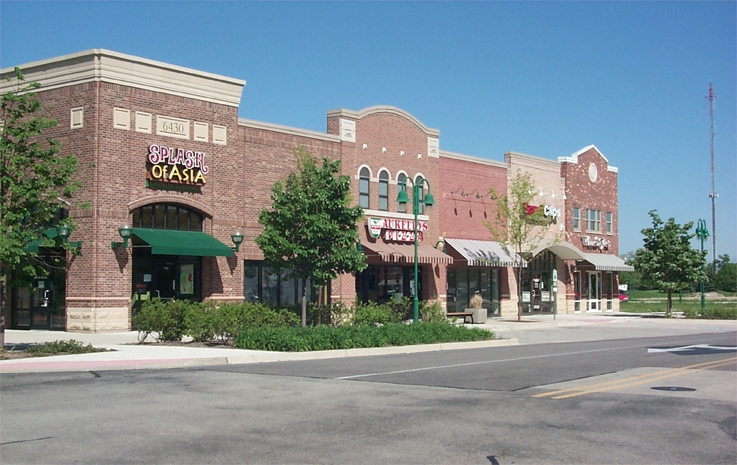
- Main Street (off Illinois Route 53) in Woodridge

- Flag logo

- Location of Woodridge in DuPage County, Illinois.

- Location within Greater Chicago Location within Illinois Location within the United States
- Coordinates: 41°44′52″N 88°02′46″W
- Country: United States
- State: Illinois
- County: DuPage, Will, Cook
- Township: Lisle, Downers Grove, DuPage, Lemont

Area
  - Total: 9.79 sq mi (25.36 km^{2})
  - Land: 9.63 sq mi (24.94 km^{2})
  - Water: 0.16 sq mi (0.41 km^{2})
- Elevation: 758 ft (231 m)

Population (2020)
  - Total: 34,158
  - Density: 3,546.7/sq mi (1,369.37/km^{2})
- Time zone: UTC−6 (CST)
  - Summer (DST): UTC−5 (CDT)
- ZIP codes: 60517, 60596
- Area codes: 630 and 331
- FIPS code: 17-83245
- GNIS feature ID: 2399735
- Website: www.woodridgeil.gov

Woodridge is a village in DuPage County, Illinois, with small portions in Will and Cook counties, and a southwestern suburb of Chicago. Per the 2020 census, the population was 34,158.

The village is just north of the I-55 junction with IL-53. Woodridge was incorporated on August 24, 1959, with less than 500 residents. It is named for its location in a wooded area above a steep hillside, locally known as "The Ridge," which overlooks the DuPage River's East Branch and the Des Plaines Valley.

Woodridge is a young community with the vast majority of its homes, businesses, and churches constructed after the 1950s. Woodridge was founded by a housing developer, Albert Kaufman, who was largely responsible for the creation of the village.

Woodridge is the location of the Home Run Inn pizzeria chain and was the location of Pabst Brewing Company from 2006 to 2011.

== Geography ==
Woodridge, Illinois

Climate chart (precipitation, max. and min. temperature)
J	F	M	A	M	J	J	A	S	O	N	D
1.9 32 14	1.6 38 19	2.6 50 28	3.8 63 38	3.9 75 48	3.9 84 57	4 87 63	4.6 85 61	3.4 78 53	2.7 67 42	3.2 50 32	2.5 37 20
- █ Average max. and min. temperatures in °F
- █ Precipitation totals in inches
- Source: The Weather Channel
Metric conversion
J	F	M	A	M	J	J	A	S	O	N	D
47 0 −10	40 3 −7	67 10 −2	97 17 3	100 24 9	99 29 14	101 31 17	117 29 16	86 26 12	68 19 6	81 10 0	62 3 −7
- █ Average max. and min. temperatures in °C
- █ Precipitation totals in mm

According to the 2021 census gazetteer files, Woodridge has a total area of 9.79 square miles (25.36 km^{2}), of which 9.63 square miles (24.94 km^{2}) (or 98.37%) is land and 0.16 square miles (0.41 km^{2}) (or 1.63%) is water.

Woodridge has been named a "Tree City" by the Arbor Day Foundation for the past 16 years, and a study undertaken in 1996 indicated that village has over 8,000 publicly owned trees.

On June 20, 2021, just after 11pm local time, Woodridge was struck by an EF-3 tornado. The storm damaged 225 homes in Woodridge and adjoining suburbs. The tornado also damaged the rectory of Saint Scholastica Church and demolished the rectory's garage. There were no fatalities and eight people were sent to area hospitals.

=== Climate ===
Woodridge is in a humid continental climate zone. On average, July is the warmest month, and January is the coldest month. August typically has the most precipitation, and February the least. The record high for Woodridge was 105 °F (40.56 °C) in July 2005, and the record low of −26 °F (−32 °C) was set in January 1985.

== Demographics ==
Historical population
Census	Pop.	Note	%±
1960	542		—
1970	11,028		1,934.7%
1980	21,763		97.3%
1990	26,256		20.6%
2000	30,934		17.8%
2010	32,971		6.6%
2020	34,158		3.6%
U.S. Decennial Census; 2010 2020

=== Racial and ethnic composition ===
Woodridge village, Illinois – Racial and ethnic composition Note: the US Census treats Hispanic/Latino as an ethnic category. This table excludes Latinos from the racial categories and assigns them to a separate category. Hispanics/Latinos may be of any race.
Race / Ethnicity (NH = Non-Hispanic)	Pop 2000	Pop 2010	Pop 2020	% 2000	% 2010	% 2020
White alone (NH)	21,671	20,942	19,880	70.06%	63.52%	58.20%
Black or African American alone (NH)	2,440	2,858	3,346	7.89%	8.67%	9.80%
Native American or Alaska Native alone (NH)	30	37	41	0.10%	0.11%	0.12%
Asian alone (NH)	3,472	4,092	4,519	11.22%	12.41%	13.23%
Native Hawaiian or Pacific Islander alone (NH)	3	3	15	0.01%	0.01%	0.04%
Other race alone (NH)	36	52	150	0.12%	0.16%	0.44%
Mixed race or Multiracial (NH)	443	562	1,152	1.43%	1.70%	3.37%
Hispanic or Latino (any race)	2,839	4,425	5,055	9.18%	13.42%	14.80%
Total	30,934	32,971	34,158	100.00%	100.00%	100.00%

=== 2020 census ===
As of the 2020 census, Woodridge had a population of 34,158. The median age was 38.9 years. 22.0% of residents were under the age of 18 and 14.4% were 65 years of age or older. For every 100 females, there were 94.7 males, and for every 100 females age 18 and over there were 92.2 males age 18 and over.

99.9% of residents lived in urban areas, while 0.1% lived in rural areas.

There were 13,468 households in Woodridge, including 8,762 families. Of all households, 31.1% had children under the age of 18 living in them, 52.0% were married-couple households, 17.0% were households with a male householder and no spouse or partner present, and 25.3% were households with a female householder and no spouse or partner present. About 26.3% of all households were made up of individuals, and 8.6% had someone living alone who was 65 years of age or older.

The population density was 3,488.71 inhabitants per square mile (1,347.00/km^{2}). There were 14,068 housing units at an average density of 1,436.83 per square mile (554.76/km^{2}). Of all housing units, 4.3% were vacant. The homeowner vacancy rate was 0.9% and the rental vacancy rate was 7.4%.

=== Income and poverty ===
The median income for a household in the village was $88,803, and the median income for a family was $104,957. Males had a median income of $52,368 versus $41,125 for females. The per capita income for the village was $43,098. About 2.3% of families and 4.4% of the population were below the poverty line, including 5.0% of those under age 18 and 3.4% of those age 65 or over.

== Government ==
The village's government is overseen by the Mayor and a board of trustees elected at large. As of 2023 the mayor is Gina Cunningham-Picek. The Village Clerk is Joseph Heneghan.

== Parks and recreation ==
The Woodridge Park District maintains a well distributed group of local parks and open spaces, offering facilities for picnicking as well as sports like baseball, basketball, tennis, soccer, cricket and newly added for 2008, Frisbee golf. The Park District also maintains Cypress Cove water park and the Athletic Recreation Center which opened in January 2017.

A skate park was added in to Janes Avenue Park. It allows for skateboarders, BMX riders, and inline skaters to skate at their own risk. There is no daily entrance fee. The skate park is open from 10:00 a.m.-10:00 p.m. The park does have lights.

A series of bike paths built by the park district allow cyclists to ride through the town on paved, dedicated paths.

Golf is another popular recreational activity. Village Greens of Woodridge is a Village-owned, 18-hole golf course; Seven Bridges is another Woodridge owned (but not members-only) championship class course. Zigfield Troy is a 9-hole, par 3 course.

Woodridge is home to two multi-screen movie theaters, most notably the Cinemark Seven Bridges (which features an IMAX screen) and Hollywood Boulevard, as well as dining options ranging from fast food to formal banquets.

== Education ==
The Woodridge School District 68 maintains six elementary schools, Edgewood, Willow Creek, Sipley, William F. Murphy (named after Mayor Murphy), Meadowview, and Goodrich, (serving grades K-6) and one junior high, Jefferson Junior High School, (for grades 7 and 8). Woodridge does not have its own high school. The majority of Woodridge secondary school students attend Downers Grove North or South High Schools in the recently renamed Community High School District 99. Some students in southern Woodridge are served by Lemont District 210 and attend Lemont High School. Additionally, Woodridge students who reside west of the DuPage River (Seven Bridges Single-Family Residences) attend Naperville schools in District 203.

== Infrastructure ==
=== Transportation ===
An industrial spur for the Burlington Northern Santa Fe Railroad serves International Center, a large industrial area in the far south section. Commuter passenger rail service between Chicago and Aurora can be accessed in nearby Lisle or Downers Grove.

Bus service is provided by Pace, under the coordination of the Regional Transportation Authority.

==== Highways ====
- Interstate 55
- Interstate 355
- Historic US 66
- Route 53

=== Public safety ===
The Police Department is a full-service force of 51 officers, a records department and a resource center. The Woodridge Police Department contracts with DuPage Public Safety Communications to provide dispatch services. Woodridge was one of the first communities nationwide to adopt aggressive legislation against underage tobacco use, and the Woodridge Police Department was one of the first to conduct regular "sting" operations using young teens hired by the department to check compliance for tobacco and alcohol sales.

Woodridge lies within three fire protection districts, the boundaries of which were drawn before the incorporation of the village. As a result, Woodridge does not maintain a village fire department. The fire departments serving the residents are the Lisle-Woodridge Fire District, the Darien-Woodridge Fire District, and the Lemont Fire District.

== Notable people ==
- Thax Douglas, poet
- Frank Kaminsky, NBA player for the Phoenix Suns
- Nick Solak, MLB player for the Atlanta Braves
- James "Turk" Torello, American mobster, caporegime and enforcer for Chicago Outfit
- Doug Walker, film critic, Internet personality
