= Thax Douglas =

American poet

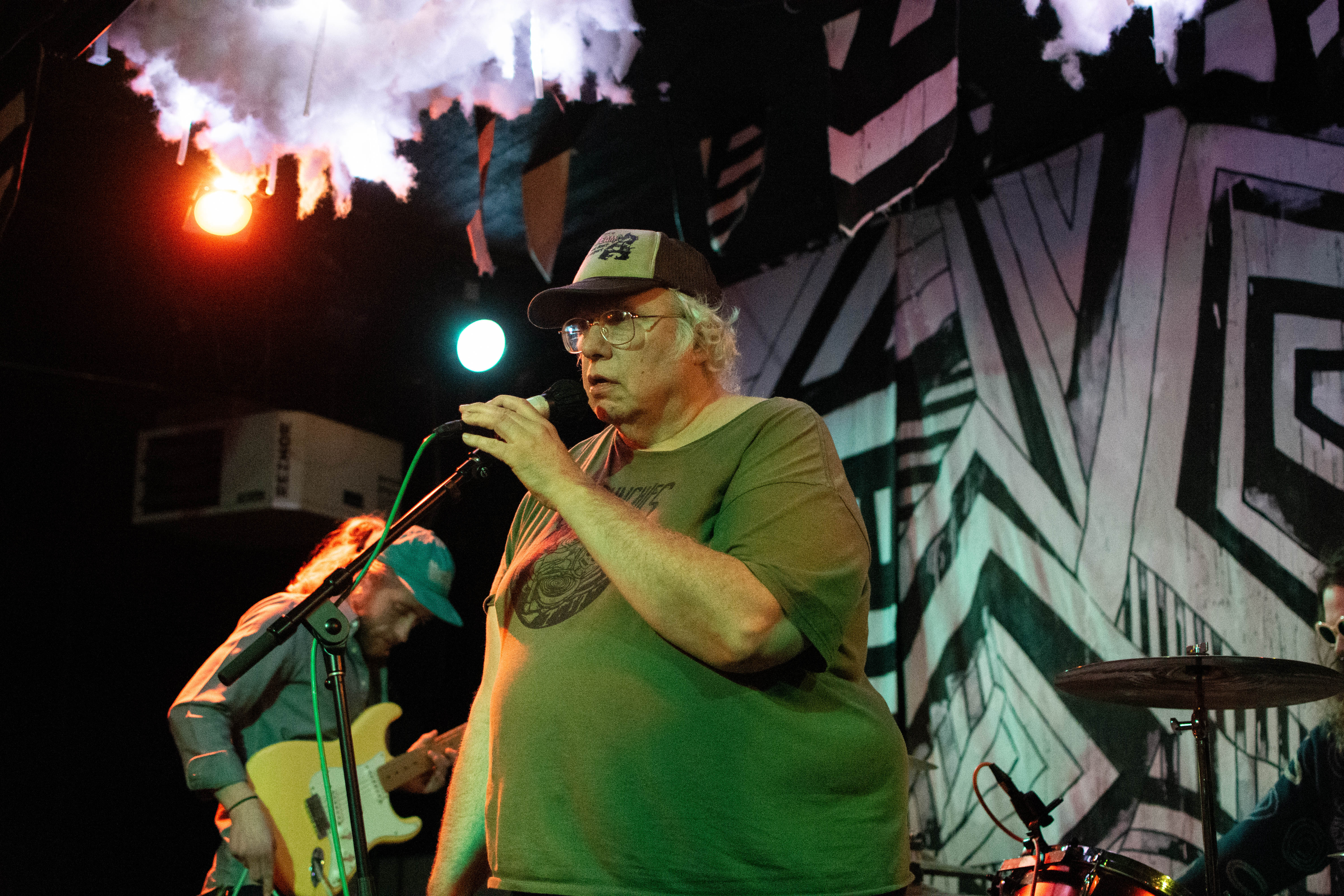
- Thax Douglas reads a poem at Cactus Club, Milwaukee, January 18th, 2025
- Born: October 31, 1957 (age 68); Chicago, Illinois, U.S.
- Occupation: Poet
- Writing career
- Years active: 1980s − current

Thaxter Elliott Douglas III (born October 31, 1957), better known as Thax Douglas, is an American poet who performs in Madison, Wisconsin. Thax grew up in Woodridge, Illinois. For many years, Thax was a fixture at Chicago-area music concerts, prefacing performances with poems directly inspired by the music of the bands. Many of Douglas' poems have been compiled in his books, which are self-distributed. He began writing "confessional poetry" in Chicago in the 1980s before he settled on his present style of "poetry-portraits". In addition to his poetry he was known for his physical appearance: a tall, heavyset man with long white beard in battered overcoat.

In 2006, after 20 years as a Chicago art and music scene performer, Douglas briefly moved to New York City, but soon returned to Chicago. He resumed his pre-music performances in Chicago until he moved to Austin, Texas in 2009. In 2010, Douglas left Austin and moved in with his father in Brodhead, Wisconsin, but he did not resume performing until 2014. After moving to Wisconsin, Douglas was diagnosed as autistic.

In 2007, a documentary about Douglas entitled THAX was released and presented at the Chicago Underground Film Festival.

The Posies 2010 album Blood/Candy takes its title from Douglas' poem written for their 2000 show at Schuba's in Chicago.
