= Francis West Smith House =

Historic house in Wisconsin, United States

- U.S. National Register of Historic Places
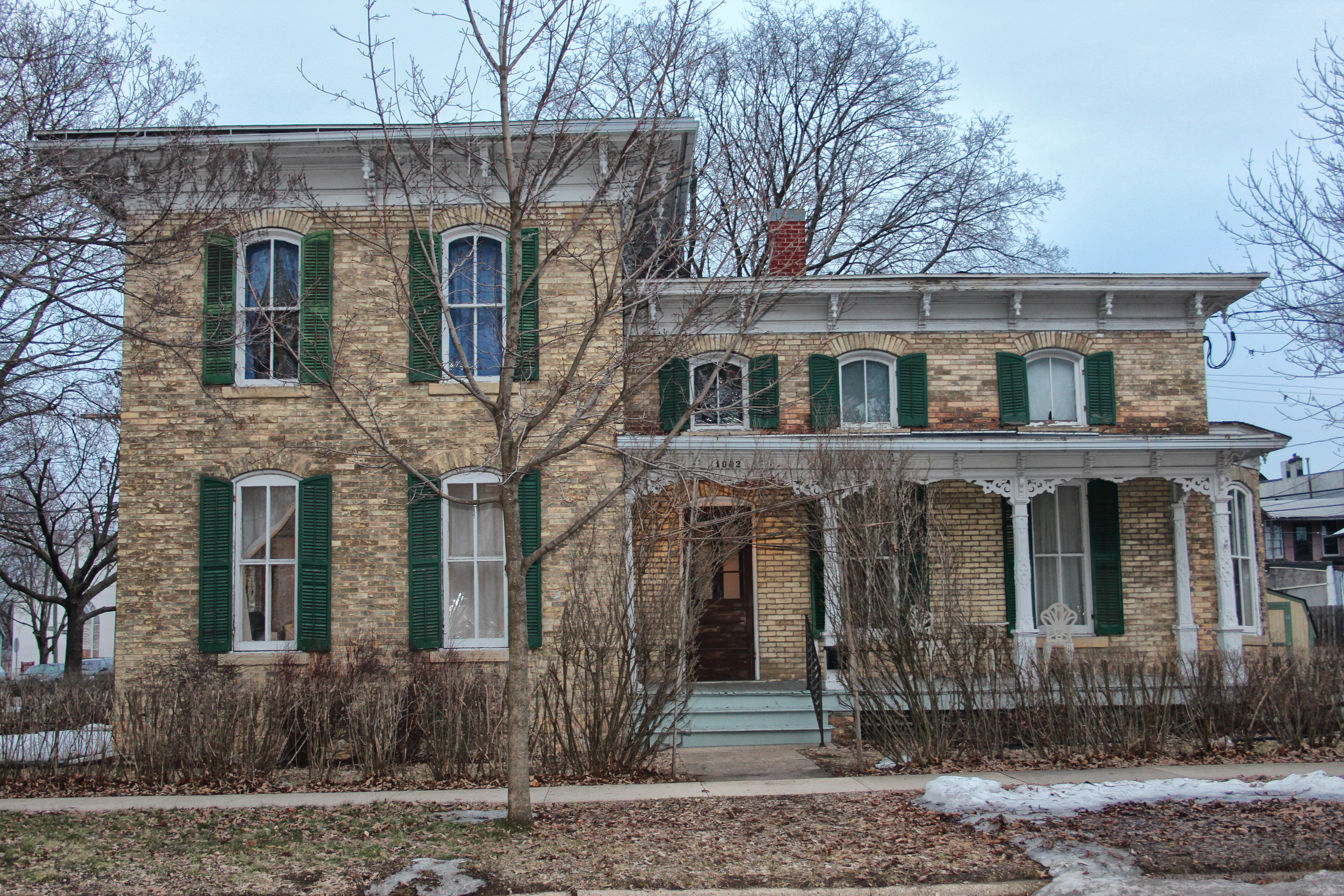
- Francis West Smith House
- Location: 1002 W. 2nd Ave., Brodhead, Wisconsin
- Coordinates: 42°37′14″N 89°22′40″W
- Area: 0.4 acres (0.16 ha)
- Built: 1877
- Architectural style: Italianate
- NRHP reference No.: 79000083
- Added to NRHP: April 17, 1979

The Francis West Smith House is a historic house at 1002 W. 2nd Avenue in Brodhead, Wisconsin. The house was built in 1877 for Francis W. Smith, a local grocer who moved to Wisconsin from New York. Smith wanted his house to be near his grocery store, and the house is still only a block away from Brodhead's commercial core. The house has an Italianate design featuring large front and rear porches, a bay window on the south side, tall and narrow arched windows on the front facade, and a low hip roof with a bracketed cornice. After Smith's death in 1882, his wife and daughter continued to live in the house; his daughter married local merchant Loudon Blackbourn, who also took over the Smith grocery building, and their descendants still own the house.

The house was added to the National Register of Historic Places in 1979 and to the State Register of Historic Places in 1989.
