= Woodridge School District 68 =

School district in DuPage County, Illinois, United States

Address
- 7925 Janes Avenue Woodridge, DuPage County, Illinois, 60517; United States
- Coordinates: 41°44′28″N 88°02′23″W

District information
- Grades: PK–8
- Superintendent: Patrick J. Broncato
- Schools: 7
- Budget: US$64.3 million (2018)
- NCES District ID: 1717040

Students and staff
- Students: 2,957 (2020)
- Teachers: 208 (2020)

Other information
- Website: www.woodridge68.org

Woodridge School District 68 is a preschool through 8th grade school district headquartered in Woodridge, Illinois.

== Schools ==
As of 2025, the school district consists of 1 junior high school and 6 elementary schools.

Junior high school

- Thomas Jefferson Junior High School

Elementary schools

- Edgewood Elementary School
- Goodrich Elementary School
- Meadowview Elementary School
- William F. Murphy Elementary School
- John L. Sipley Elementary School
- Willow Creek Elementary School
