= Brodhead, Wisconsin =

- City
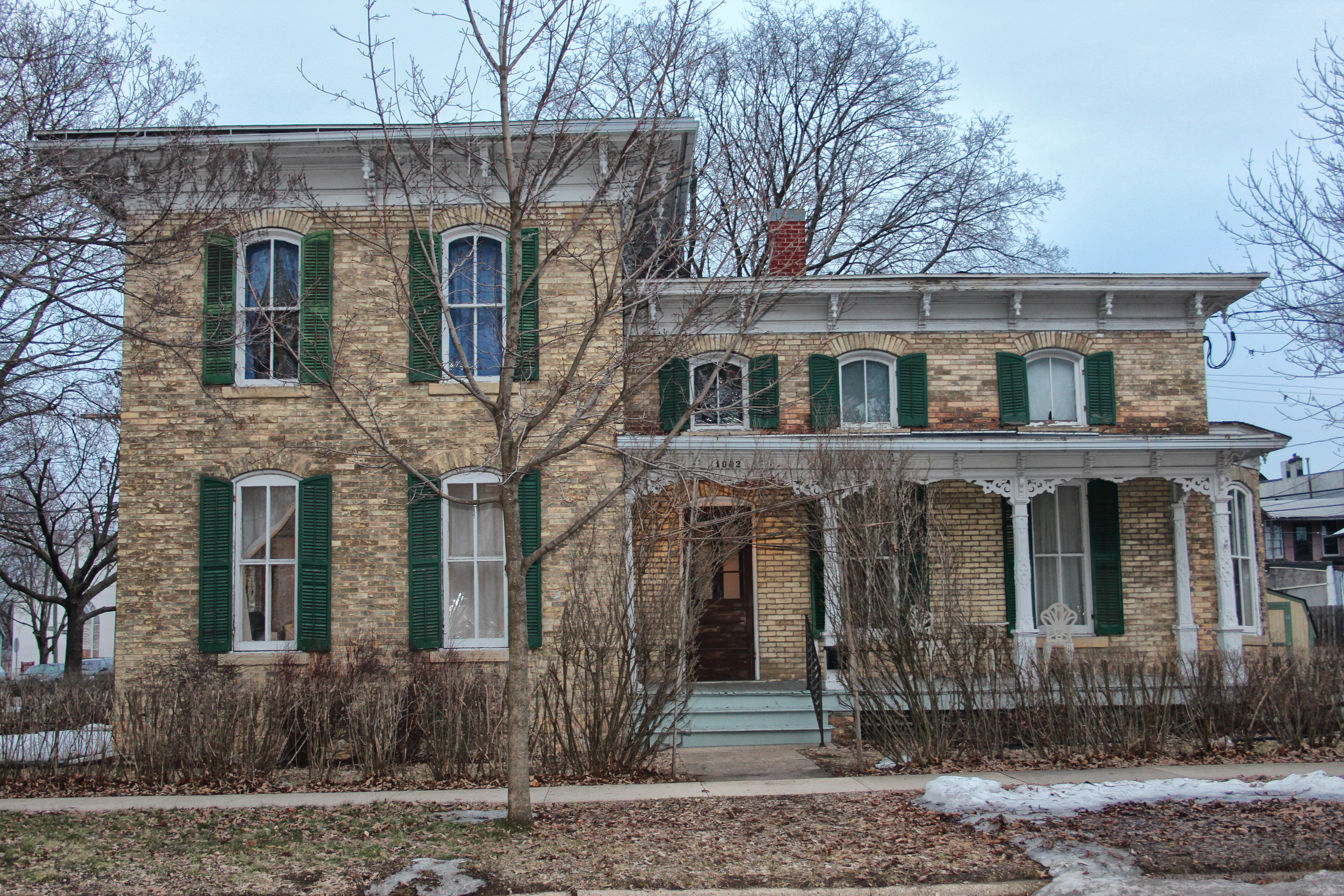
- Francis West Smith House

- Location of Brodhead in Rock County, Wisconsin

- Location within Wisconsin Location within the United States
- Coordinates: 42°37′7″N 89°22′35″W
- Country: United States
- State: Wisconsin
- Counties: Green, Rock

Government
  - Mayor: Thomas Simpson

Area
  - Total: 1.80 sq mi (4.65 km^{2})
  - Land: 1.80 sq mi (4.65 km^{2})
  - Water: 0 sq mi (0.00 km^{2})
- Elevation: 794 ft (242 m)

Population (2020)
  - Total: 3,274
  - Density: 1,809.1/sq mi (698.49/km^{2})
- Time zone: UTC-6 (Central (CST))
  - Summer (DST): UTC-5 (CDT)
- Zip Code: 53520
- Area code: 608
- FIPS code: 55-09925
- GNIS feature ID: 1562229
- Website: www.cityofbrodheadwi.gov

Brodhead is a city in Green and Rock counties in the U.S. state of Wisconsin. The population was 3,274 at the 2020 census. In February 2000, the city annexed a portion of land from the Town of Spring Valley in Rock County. Brodhead was founded in 1856.

== History ==
Just south of town is a historic marker for the Half-Way Tree, a bur oak supposedly identified by Native Americans as the halfway point on a foot trail between Lake Michigan and the Mississippi River. Present day experts say the tree is off by about six miles but there is also a disagreement about the methods of measurement. The half-way tree still stands protected and still marks the half-way point.

The railroad track that runs east and west through town features a small museum with a train and army tank on display, adjacent to the park and bandstand pavilion. The museum curator said that the railroad was being wooed by two different towns and decided to split the difference and created Brodhead in the spring of 1856.

The town was named in honor of the chief engineer of the Milwaukee and Mississippi Railroad, Edward Hallock Brodhead (1809–1890), who was among the earliest promoters of the railway depot. The initial street names of the town were platted after the surnames of the landowners, eventually changed to numerical titles to reflect practical purposes.

Other cofounders include: Edmund Deacon Clinton (1804–1885), Isaac Foster Mack (1806–1886), John P. Dixon, John Lucas Vischer Thomas (1825–1917), John L. McNair (1809–1877), Edmund Abbott West (1823–1922) and Erastus M. Smith.

A nearby raceway was dredged off of a branch of the Sugar River that diverted a long canal to a hydroelectric generator that supplied electricity to the town. This gave Brodhead the distinction of having electrical service before other larger cities such as Chicago, and perhaps the first electrical service in Wisconsin.

== Geography ==
Brodhead is located at 42°37′7″N 89°22′35″W (42.618540, -89.376291).

According to the United States Census Bureau, the city has a total area of 1.84 square miles (4.77 km^{2}), all of it land.

== Climate ==
According to the Köppen Climate Classification system, Brodhead has a hot-summer humid continental climate, abbreviated "Dfa" on climate maps. The hottest temperature recorded in Brodhead was 111 °F (43.9 °C) on July 21, 1901 and July 12–14, 1936, while the coldest temperature recorded was −36 °F (−37.8 °C) on January 30, 1951.

Climate data for Brodhead, Wisconsin, 1991–2020 normals, extremes 1897–present
Month	Jan	Feb	Mar	Apr	May	Jun	Jul	Aug	Sep	Oct	Nov	Dec	Year
Record high °F (°C)	61 (16)	73 (23)	84 (29)	92 (33)	105 (41)	109 (43)	111 (44)	103 (39)	102 (39)	90 (32)	80 (27)	69 (21)	111 (44)
Mean maximum °F (°C)	47.6 (8.7)	52.4 (11.3)	67.8 (19.9)	79.4 (26.3)	87.3 (30.7)	92.3 (33.5)	92.7 (33.7)	91.6 (33.1)	88.9 (31.6)	82.1 (27.8)	66.0 (18.9)	51.8 (11.0)	94.9 (34.9)
Mean daily maximum °F (°C)	27.4 (−2.6)	31.8 (−0.1)	44.4 (6.9)	58.3 (14.6)	70.1 (21.2)	79.8 (26.6)	83.1 (28.4)	81.3 (27.4)	74.6 (23.7)	61.6 (16.4)	46.0 (7.8)	32.8 (0.4)	57.6 (14.2)
Daily mean °F (°C)	19.0 (−7.2)	22.7 (−5.2)	34.5 (1.4)	46.9 (8.3)	58.6 (14.8)	68.6 (20.3)	72.0 (22.2)	70.1 (21.2)	62.4 (16.9)	50.2 (10.1)	36.9 (2.7)	25.0 (−3.9)	47.2 (8.5)
Mean daily minimum °F (°C)	10.5 (−11.9)	13.6 (−10.2)	24.6 (−4.1)	35.4 (1.9)	47.1 (8.4)	57.4 (14.1)	61.0 (16.1)	58.9 (14.9)	50.1 (10.1)	38.8 (3.8)	27.8 (−2.3)	17.2 (−8.2)	36.9 (2.7)
Mean minimum °F (°C)	−11.8 (−24.3)	−6.8 (−21.6)	4.6 (−15.2)	23.2 (−4.9)	33.7 (0.9)	44.8 (7.1)	51.0 (10.6)	49.2 (9.6)	36.9 (2.7)	25.5 (−3.6)	12.2 (−11.0)	−3.9 (−19.9)	−16.1 (−26.7)
Record low °F (°C)	−36 (−38)	−35 (−37)	−21 (−29)	7 (−14)	24 (−4)	33 (1)	40 (4)	35 (2)	20 (−7)	2 (−17)	−18 (−28)	−30 (−34)	−36 (−38)
Average precipitation inches (mm)	1.59 (40)	1.75 (44)	2.11 (54)	3.73 (95)	4.18 (106)	5.56 (141)	4.00 (102)	4.35 (110)	3.78 (96)	2.94 (75)	2.35 (60)	1.96 (50)	38.30 (973)
Average snowfall inches (cm)	10.3 (26)	9.3 (24)	4.5 (11)	0.9 (2.3)	0.1 (0.25)	0.0 (0.0)	0.0 (0.0)	0.0 (0.0)	0.0 (0.0)	0.3 (0.76)	2.2 (5.6)	9.7 (25)	37.3 (94.91)
Average precipitation days (≥ 0.01 in)	9.6	8.4	9.8	12.0	13.3	12.2	9.9	9.9	9.0	9.6	8.6	9.8	122.1
Average snowy days (≥ 0.1 in)	6.9	5.7	3.0	0.7	0.0	0.0	0.0	0.0	0.0	0.2	1.3	5.4	23.2
Source 1: NOAA
Source 2: National Weather Service

== Demographics ==
Historical population
Census	Pop.	Note	%±
1870	1,548		—
1880	1,254		−19.0%
1890	1,461		16.5%
1900	1,584		8.4%
1910	1,517		−4.2%
1920	1,600		5.5%
1930	1,533		−4.2%
1940	1,750		14.2%
1950	2,016		15.2%
1960	2,444		21.2%
1970	2,515		2.9%
1980	3,153		25.4%
1990	3,165		0.4%
2000	3,180		0.5%
2010	3,293		3.6%
2020	3,274		−0.6%
U.S. Decennial Census

As of 2000 the median income for a household in the city was $36,506, and the median income for a family was $46,199. Males had a median income of $32,031 versus $24,442 for females. The per capita income for the city was $17,455. About 6.6% of families and 7.3% of the population were below the poverty line, including 4.1% of those under age 18 and 5.8% of those age 65 or over.

=== 2010 census ===
As of the census of 2010, there were 3,293 people, 1,346 households, and 851 families residing in the city. The population density was 1,789.7 inhabitants per square mile (691.0/km^{2}). There were 1,452 housing units at an average density of 789.1 per square mile (304.7/km^{2}). The racial makeup of the city was 96.4% White, 0.1% African American, 0.3% Native American, 0.5% Asian, 1.9% from other races, and 0.8% from two or more races. Hispanic or Latino people of any race were 3.8% of the population.

There were 1,346 households, of which 32.3% had children under the age of 18 living with them, 46.8% were married couples living together, 11.4% had a female householder with no husband present, 5.1% had a male householder with no wife present, and 36.8% were non-families. 31.1% of all households were made up of individuals, and 14% had someone living alone who was 65 years of age or older. The average household size was 2.41 and the average family size was 3.01.

The median age in the city was 38.4 years. 25% of residents were under the age of 18; 7.9% were between the ages of 18 and 24; 26.1% were from 25 to 44; 23.3% were from 45 to 64, and 17.6% were 65 years of age or older. The gender makeup of the city was 47.3% male and 52.7% female.

== Education ==
Brodhead is served by the Brodhead School District. There are 1,039 students in the district with grades Pre-K through 4th attending Albrecht Elementary school. Grades 5 through 8 attend Brodhead Middle School. Brodhead High School is the local high school. The high school is located at 2501 W 5th AVE Brodhead, WI 53520. Brodhead school district also has a student-teacher ratio of 13:1.

== Transportation ==
=== Wisconsin State Highways ===
- WIS 11 runs right through town as 1st Center Ave.
- WIS 81 runs south of town.
- WIS 104 starts at the northeast corner of town.

=== Railroads ===
The Wisconsin and Southern Railroad runs through town on the branch line to Monroe.

== Notable people ==
- Thax Douglas, poet; lives in Brodhead
- David Dunwiddie, Wisconsin state legislator; lived in Brodhead
- Milton S. Livingston, physicist; born in Brodhead
- Harvey T. Moore, Vermont and Wisconsin state legislator; lived in Brodhead
- Henry Putnam, Wisconsin state legislator; was President of Brodhead
- Archibald N. Randall, Wisconsin state legislator
- Burr Sprague, Wisconsin state legislator; lived in Brodhead
- Albert M. Ten Eyck, academic
- Fred Ties, Wisconsin state legislator; lived in Brodhead

== Gallery ==
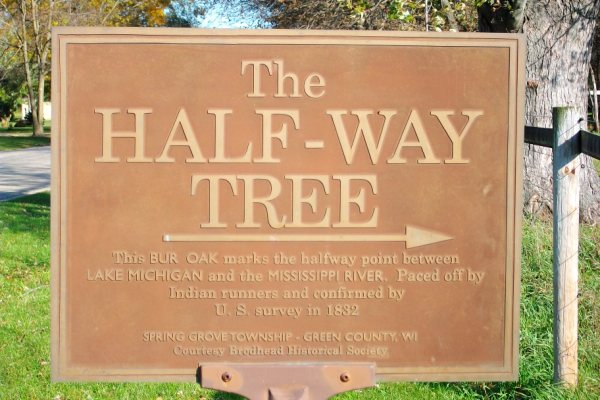

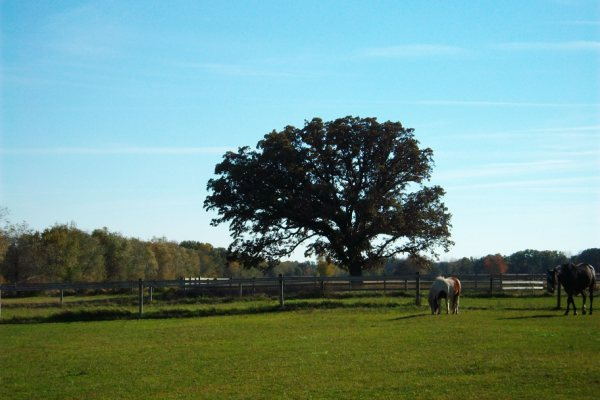
The Half-Way tree in Brodhead

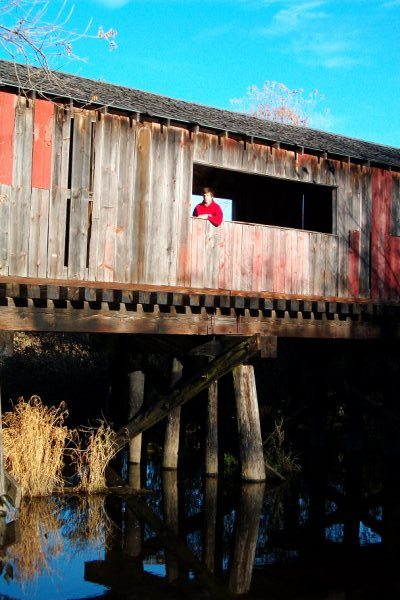
Covered bridge 1½ miles North of Brodhead on the Sugar River State Trail

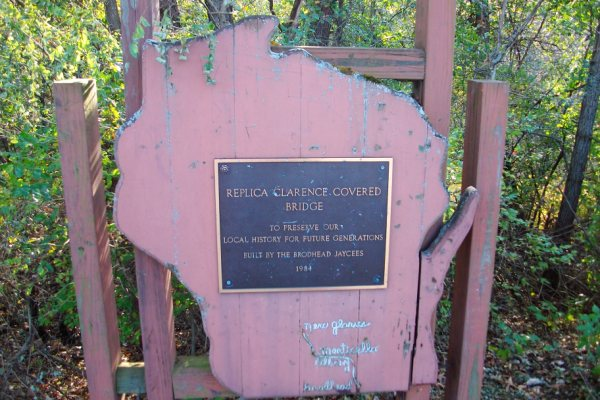
Covered bridge historic plate

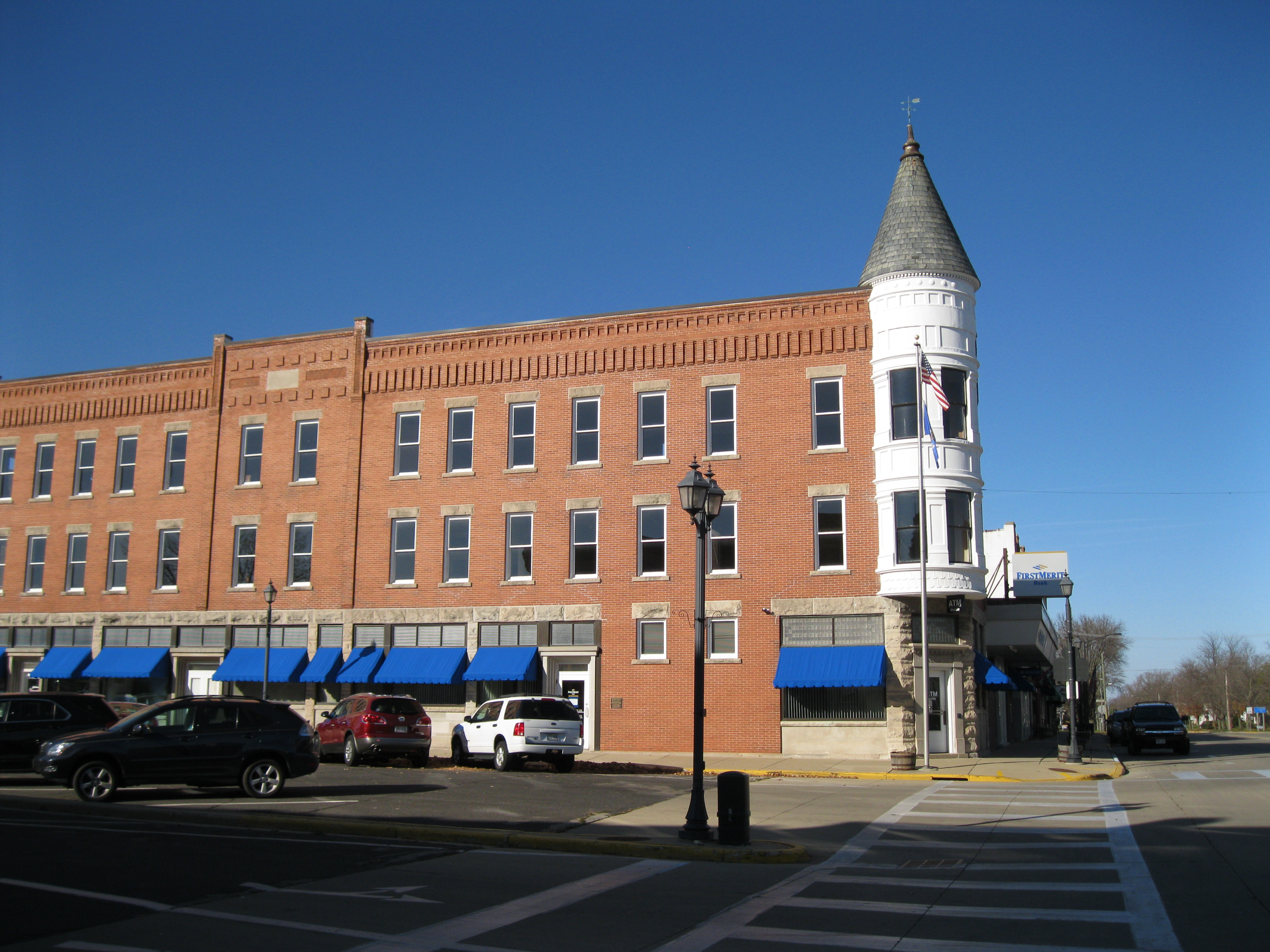
The Laube Building, part of the Exchange Square Historic District
