= Ike Sewell =

American businessman (1903–1990)

- Born: Issac Sewell; September 9, 1903; Wills Point, Texas, U.S.
- Died: August 20, 1990 (aged 86); Chicago, Illinois, U.S.
- Occupations: NCAA college athlete, businessman, restaurateur, philanthropist
- Years active: 1943–1990 (as owner of Pizzeria Uno, Pizzeria Due and Su Casa restaurants)
- Spouse(s): Florence Davis, (?-1990, his death)
- Website: Pizzeria Uno website

Issac Sewell (September 9, 1903 – August 20, 1990) was an American athlete, businessman, entrepreneur, and founder of the Uno Chicago Grill restaurant chain that originated in Chicago, Illinois, as well as founder of the Pizzeria Uno and Pizzeria Due restaurants there in 1943 and 1955, respectively. Sewell started as an All-Southwestern Conference guard as a player on the Texas Longhorn football teams from 1926 to 1929.

== Biography ==
=== Early life and career ===
Sewell was born in Wills Point, Texas, 50 miles east of Dallas, and grew up in San Antonio. A graduate of the University of Texas at Austin, Sewell achieved both All-Southwest Conference (SWC) and All-American honors as a guard on the Longhorn football squad.

=== Pizzeria Uno and Su Casa restaurants ===
In 1943 Sewell opened Pizzeria Uno restaurant at the corner of Ohio Street and Wabash Avenue in Chicago, offering the first Chicago deep dish pizza. He had originally intended to open a Mexican restaurant. Ric Riccardo and Sewell would eventually expand and open up another restaurant, Pizzeria Due, just a block away from Pizzeria Uno, in 1955. Sewell would also open up the Chicago area's first upscale Tex-Mex restaurant, Su Casa, in 1963.

== Death ==
Just 20 days before his 87th birthday, Sewell died in Northwestern Memorial Hospital in Chicago on August 20, 1990, after suffering from a lengthy bout with leukemia for several years. He was survived by his wife Florence Davis as well as his children and several grandchildren.
