= David Dunwiddie =

American politician

David Dunwiddie (September 17, 1823 – December 19, 1896) was a member of the Wisconsin State Assembly.

== Biography ==
Dunwiddie was born in Greene County, Ohio in 1823. In 1845, he moved to what is now Green County, Wisconsin, where he became a farmer. He later settled in Brodhead, Wisconsin.

Dunwiddie married Cynthia Mitchell. They had five children. A son, Benjamin Franklin Dunwiddie, became a judge of the Wisconsin Circuit Court.

== Political career ==
Dunwiddie was a member of the Green County board of supervisors in 1860, where he served on the committees for the county poor and for justice and constable claims. Dunwiddie was a member of the Assembly during the 1865 and 1867 sessions. As a Republican, he was affiliated with the National Union Party.
