= Home Run Inn =

Restaurant chain

- Type: Private
- Founded: 1947; 79 years ago
- Founder: Mary and Vincent Grittani
- Headquarters: Woodridge, Illinois, United States
- Number of locations: 9
- Products: Pizza, Pasta
- Website: www.homeruninnpizza.com

Home Run Inn is a restaurant chain known for their Chicago-style pizza as well as frozen pizzas. Home Run Inn is headquartered in Woodridge, Illinois, United States.

== History ==
In 1923, Mary and Vincent Grittani owned a small tavern on 31st Street in Chicago, Illinois, along with their daughter Loretta and son-in-law Nick Perrino. When a home run from a nearby baseball game was hit through the tavern's window, they decided to rename the tavern Home Run Inn. In the 1940s, Mary Grittani developed the pizza recipe that is still being used today. Home Run Inn began selling frozen pizza in the 1950s, selling them in just the Chicago area.

In 1986 and 1996 frozen manufacturing plants were constructed, one in Chicago and the second in Woodridge, Illinois. In 2023, Home Run Inn expanded its frozen pizza distribution nationwide to retailers including Albertson's, Kroger, Walmart, Publix, Meijer, and Target Corporation.

Home Run Inn has nine locations, four locations in Chicago and five in the Chicago suburbs. In October 2019, the company announced the opening of their new restaurant next door to its original location on 31st Street in the Little Village neighborhood of Chicago.

== Ratings ==
Home Run Inn was rated the number one frozen pizza in the August 2013 Consumer Reports.

== See also ==
- List of pizza chains of the United States
