= Lou Malnati's Pizzeria =

American pizza chain

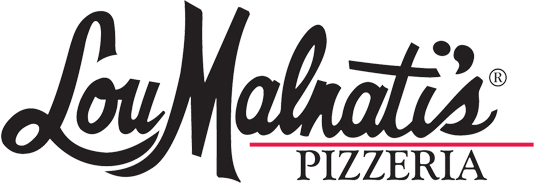

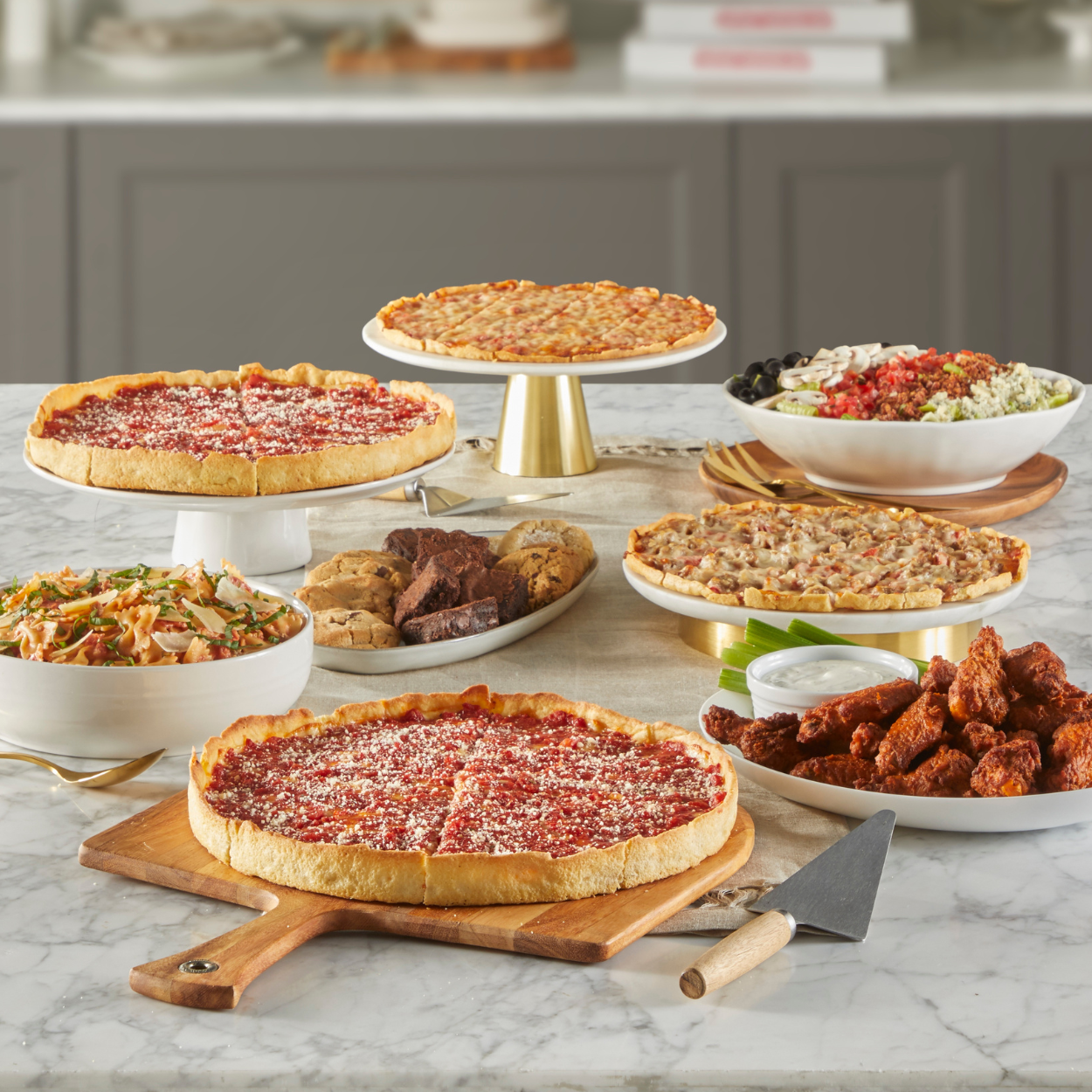
- Lou Malnati's menu items
- Type: Private
- Industry: Pizzeria; Restaurant; E-commerce
- Founded: 1971
- Headquarters: Buffalo Grove, Illinois, United States
- Number of locations: 61 Chicagoland, 8 Phoenix, Arizona area, 5 Milwaukee, Wisconsin area, 6 Indianapolis, Indiana area (2022)
- Key people: Lou Malnati, Founder; Jean Malnati, Wife; Marc Malnati, Chairman
- Products: Chicago-style pizza; Deep Dish Pizza
- Website: www.loumalnatis.com

Lou Malnati's Pizzeria is an American Chicago-style pizza restaurant chain, known for its deep dish pizza, currently headquartered in Buffalo Grove, Illinois. It was founded by Lou Malnati, who was involved in developing the recipe for Chicago-style deep dish pizza. Lou Malnati's has become one of the best-known and oldest family names of Chicago-style pizza restaurants. Its main competitors include Pizzeria Uno, Giordano's Pizza and Gino's East. In 2025 online review site Yelp named it America's top pizza chain with 60 or more locations as determined by customer ratings and reviews.

== History ==
In the 1940s, Lou Malnati began working with his father, Rudy, making deep-dish pizza. In the 1950s, they co-managed Pizzeria Uno. Lou and his wife Jean opened the first Lou Malnati's Pizzeria on March 17, 1971, in Lincolnwood, Illinois.

The Lincolnwood restaurant was successful, and the family subsequently opened another restaurant in Elk Grove Village, Illinois. Initially a rocky start, the second restaurant proved profitable, and the company continued to grow. As of April 2016, Lou Malnati's owns and operates 61 restaurants in the Chicago metropolitan area. The company participates in the Taste of Chicago and has been active in local charities.

After Lou Malnati died of cancer in 1978, his wife and sons Marc and Rick took over the business.

On July 4, 2011, Lou Malnati's opened their biggest pizzeria in the Gold Coast neighborhood of Chicago. In July 2021, Lou Malnati's announced it was moving its headquarters to Buffalo Grove, Illinois.

In 2025, Marc Malnati published an account of the pizzeria's history and his family's involvement, Deep Dish: Inside the First 50 Years of Lou Malnati’s Pizza.

== Expansion ==
Lou Malnati's has opened restaurants in three other states: Arizona (8), Indiana (6), and Wisconsin (5). Lou Malnati's began opening restaurants in the Phoenix area on May 12, 2016, with the first location opening at Uptown Plaza in central Phoenix. All locations in Arizona are in the Phoenix area. Indiana has four locations in the Indianapolis area, a fifth location is in Schererville, Indiana, which opened on July 15, 2019, and was the first Indiana opening. A store opened in Greenwood, Indiana, on June 6, 2022, followed by a location in Crown Point, Indiana, which opened February 6, 2023. The Schererville, Greenwood and Crown Point locations are exclusively carryout, delivery, and catering, offering no dine-in services. Wisconsin followed Indiana, with Lou Malnati's opening its first restaurant on December 11, 2019 in the Milwaukee suburb of Fox Point. The locations in Wisconsin are within the Milwaukee area.

Lou Malnati's operates a e-commerce shipping division of its company called Tastes of Chicago, which started in 1987 and was originally known as "Lou Malnati's Priority Pizza". Tastes of Chicago ships frozen Lou Malnati's pizzas and food from more than 30 Chicago brands nationwide including Portillo's Restaurants, Eli's Cheesecake, Garrett Popcorn, and Vienna Beef.

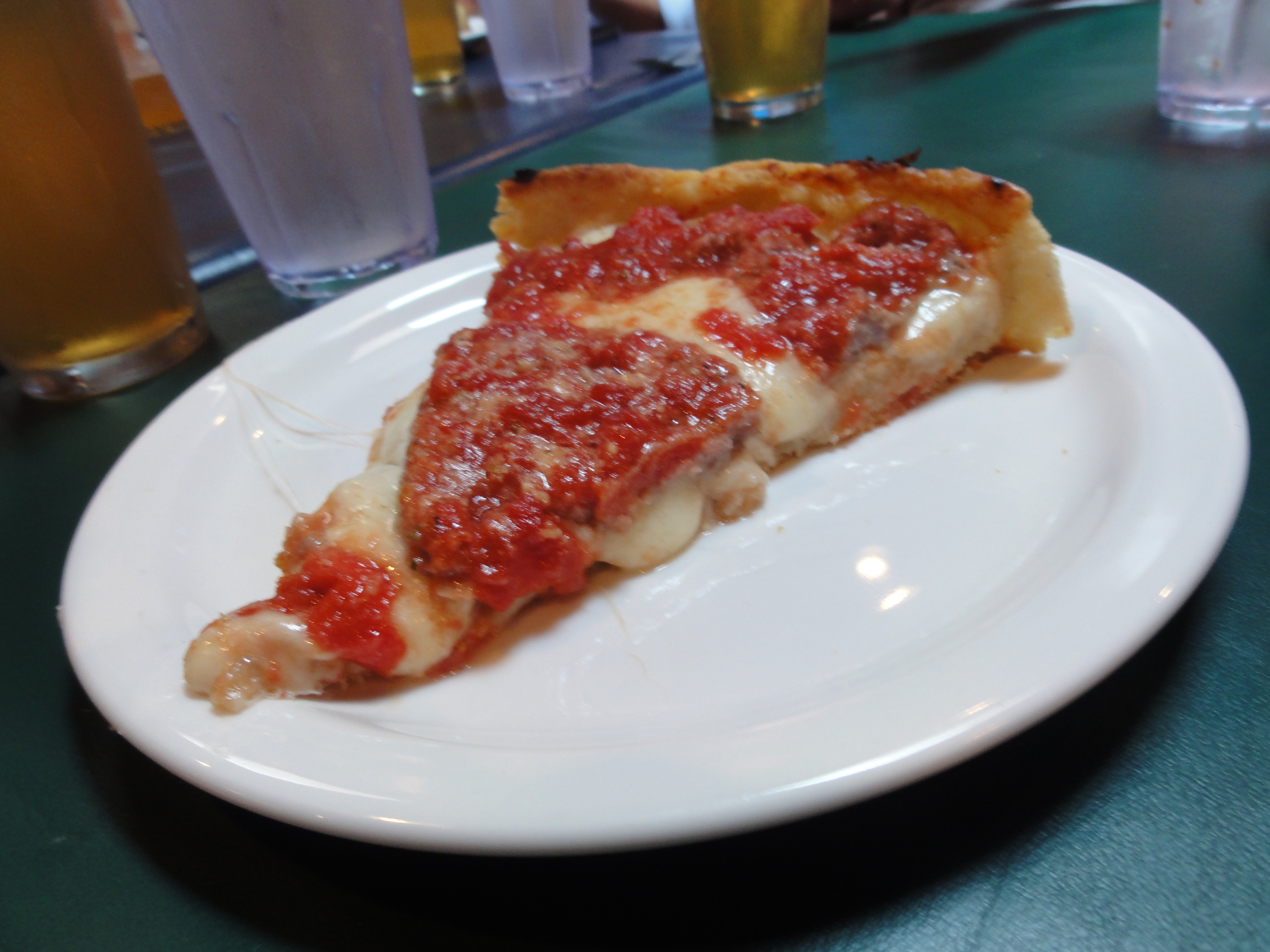
A slice of Lou Malnati's pizza

== Philanthropy ==
Since 1971, the Malnati family has hosted an annual one-day charity event. Lou and Jean Malnati started the event as a scholarship fund for local athletes to Wake Forest University in the name of Brian Piccolo, and after Lou died of cancer in 1978, Jean carried on the annual tradition in Lou's name with the focus changing to raising money for cancer research.

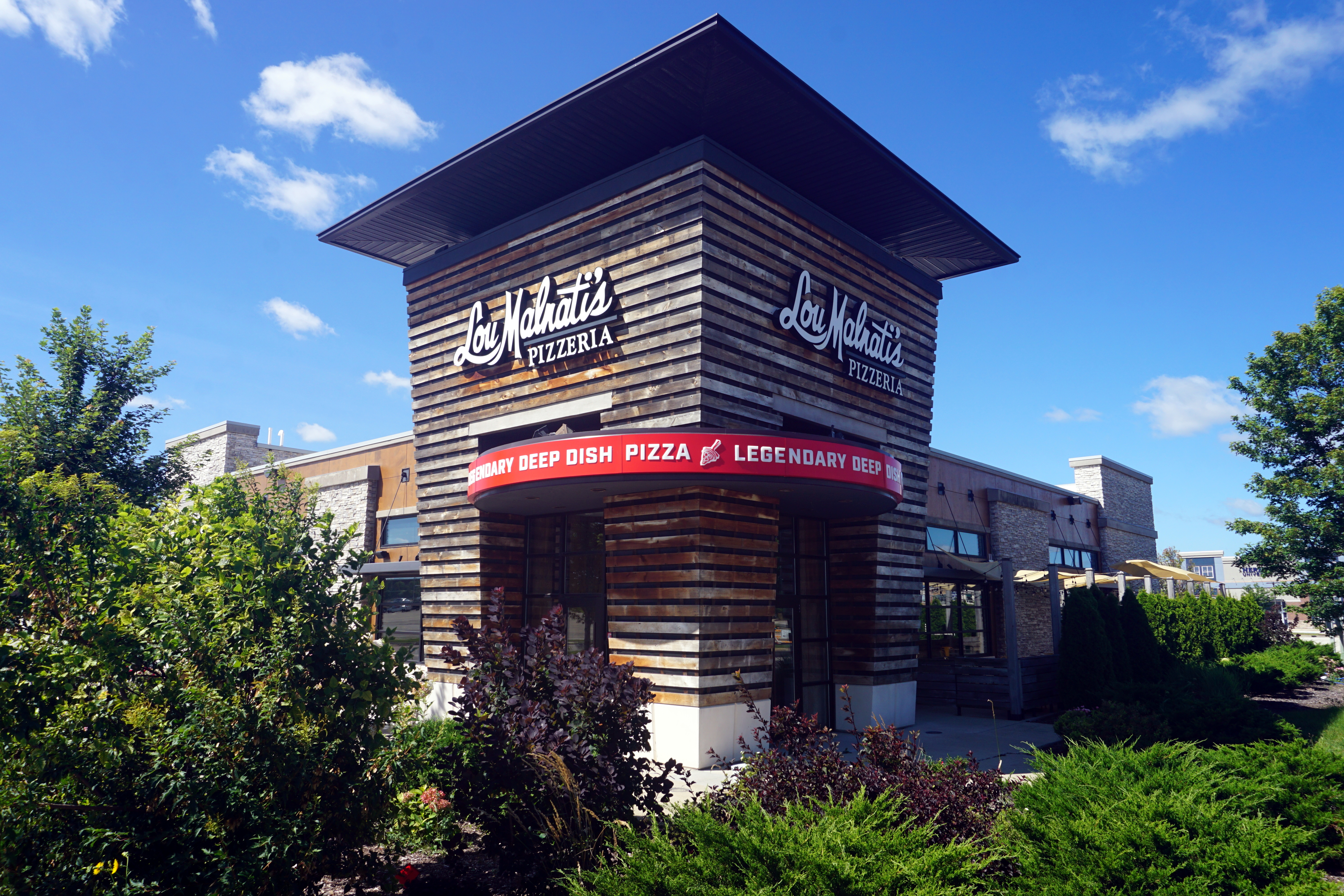
Lou Malnati's Pizzeria in Brookfield, Wisconsin

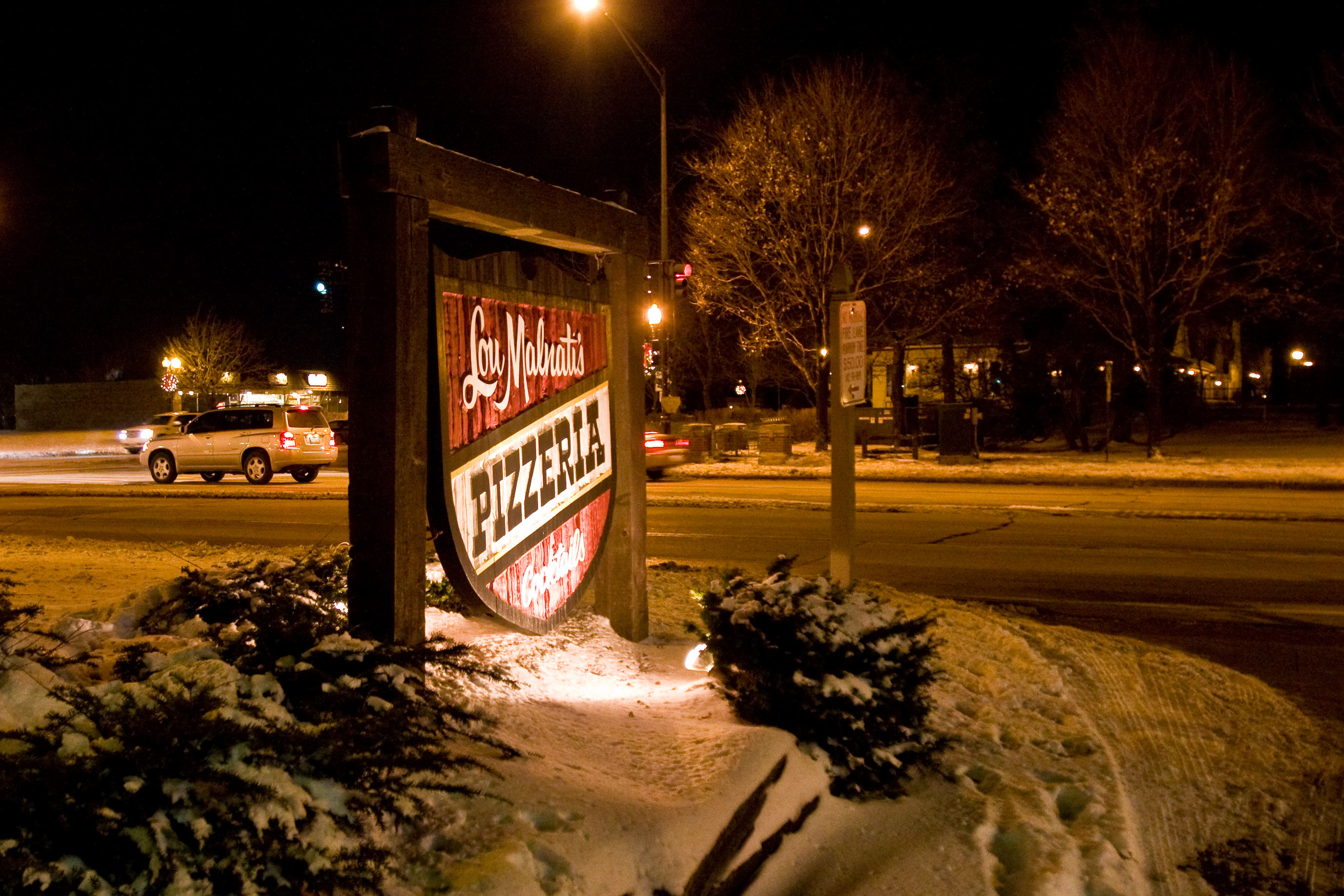
Chicagoland location

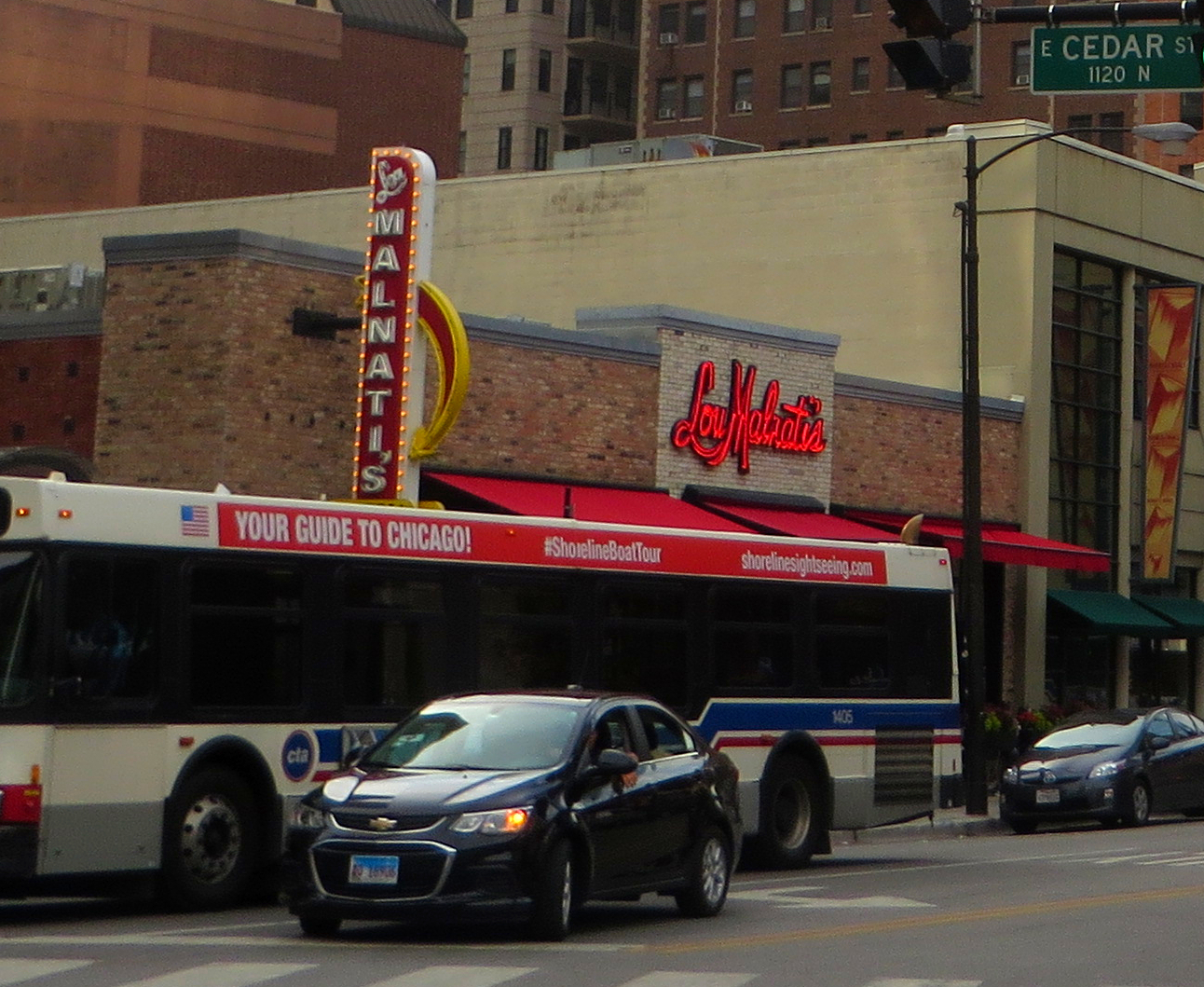
Flagship restaurant in Chicago's Gold Coast neighborhood

== See also ==
- List of pizza chains of the United States
