= Uno Pizzeria & Grill =

American pizza restaurant chain

Pizzeria Uno Corporation

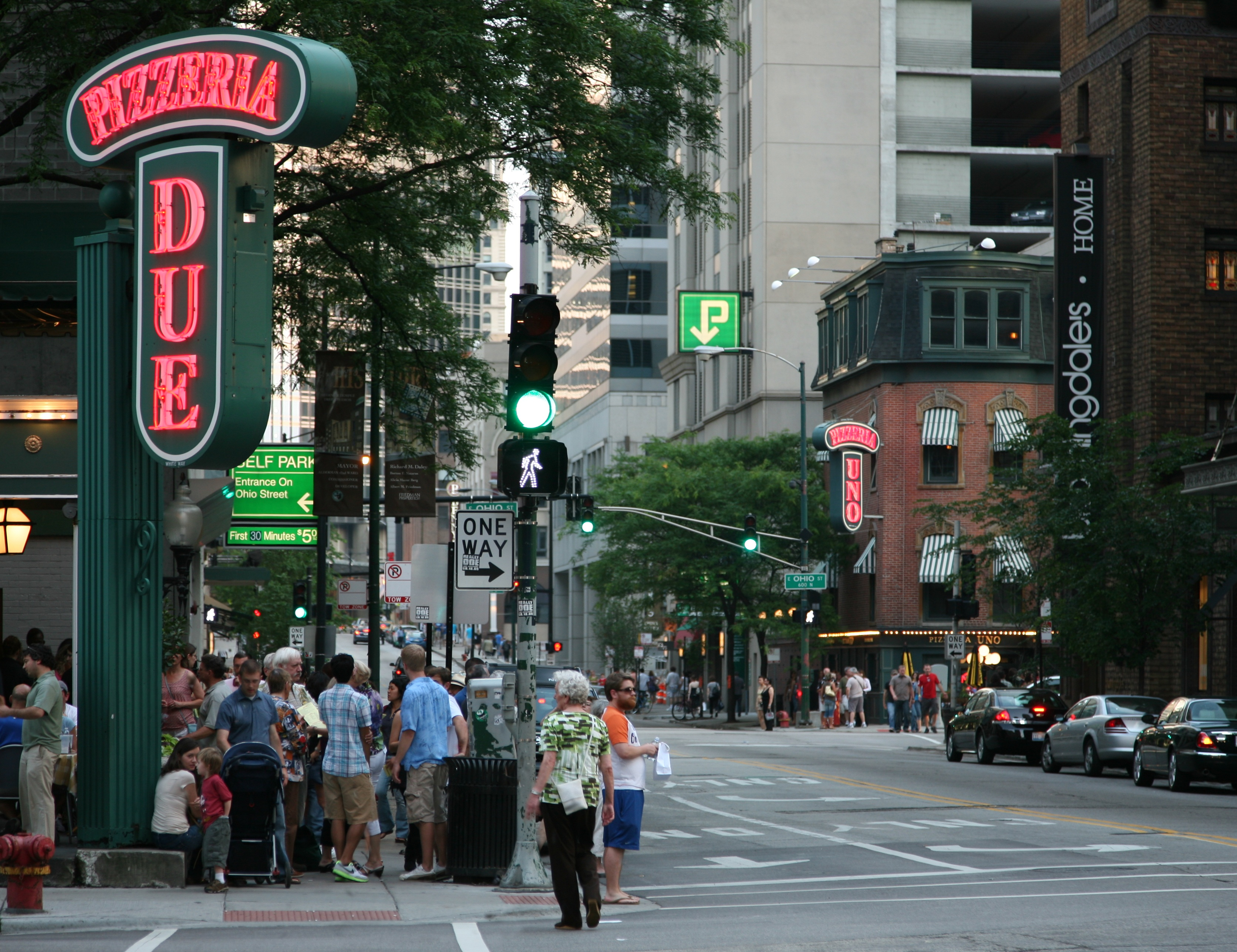
- Pizzeria Uno and Due, one block apart in Chicago
- Trade name: Uno Pizzeria and Grill
- Type: Private
- Industry: Restaurants
- Founded: Chicago, Illinois; 1943; 83 years ago
- Founders: Ike Sewell; Ric Riccardo
- Headquarters: Norwood, Massachusetts
- Number of locations: 36 (as of April 29, 2026)
- Key people: Erik Frederick (CEO); George Herz (CAO and CLO); Michael Murnane (president and CRO)
- Revenue: ▲US$384 million (2021)
- Number of employees: Approx. 2,500 (2021)
- Parent: Uno Restaurant Holdings Corporation
- Website: unos.com

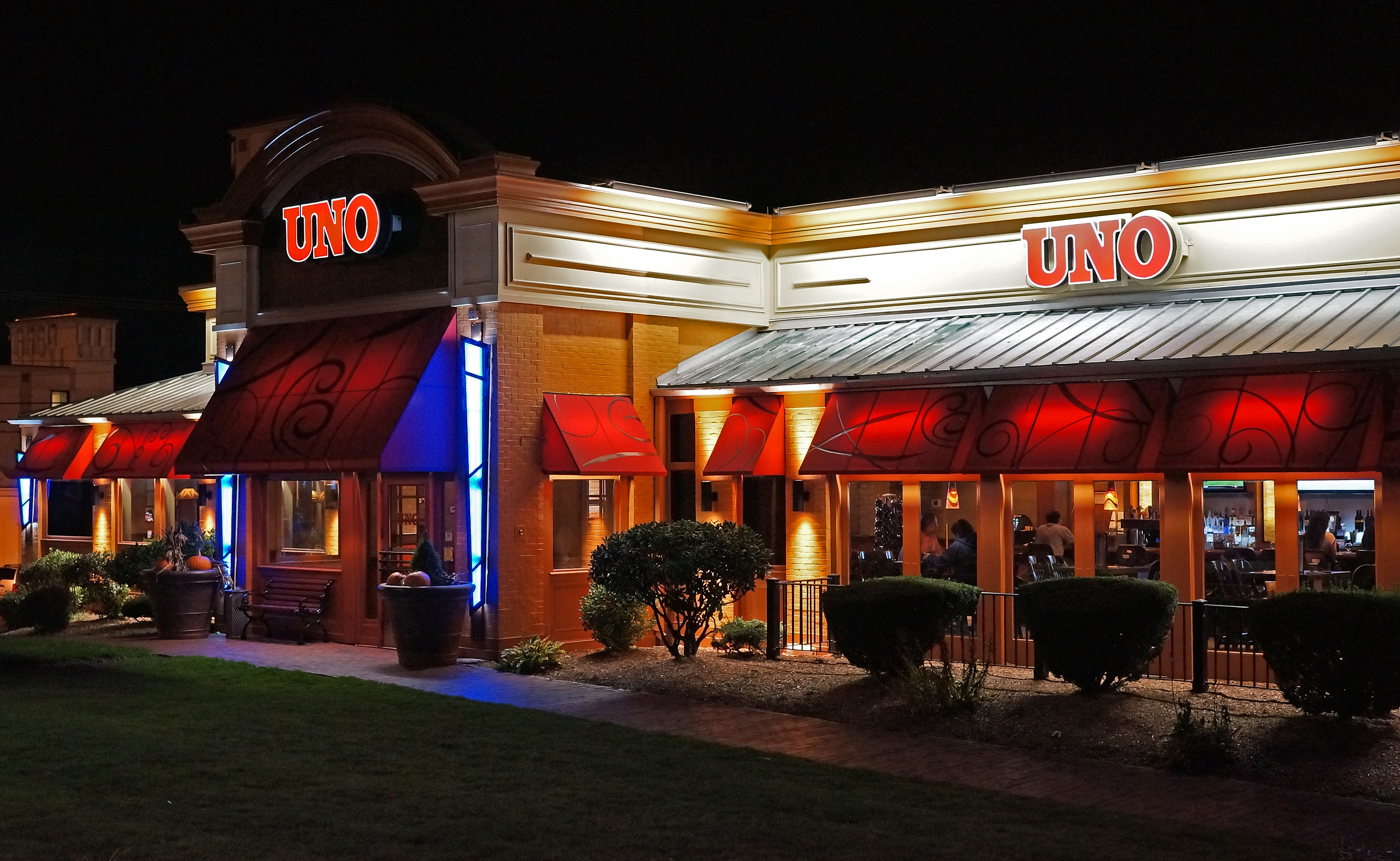
Uno Restaurant, Revere, Massachusetts in 2012—night view

Uno Pizzeria & Grill (formerly Pizzeria Uno and Uno Chicago Grill), or more informally as Uno's, is a United States–origin franchised pizzeria restaurant chain under the parent company Uno Restaurant Holdings Corporation. Uno Pizzeria and Grill is best known for its Chicago-style deep dish pizza. Ike Sewell opened the first Pizzeria Uno in 1943.

== History ==
=== Founding and original locations ===
The first Uno's was established in 1943 by Ike Sewell, formerly a University of Texas football player, and his friend Ric Riccardo, a World War II veteran, in the Near North Side, Chicago, Illinois. Sewell originally intended to open a Mexican restaurant because "there wasn't a really decent Mexican restaurant in Chicago then."

While Sewell and Riccardo are known as the owners of the original restaurant, a 1956 article from the Chicago Daily News asserts that the original deep-dish pizza recipe was created by the chef Rudy Malnati Sr., the father of Lou Malnati. Pizzeria Uno claims to have originated the deep-dish pizza.

Sewell opened two additional restaurants in response to Pizzeria Uno's popularity. Pizzeria Due opened one block north of the original Pizzeria Uno location in 1955 (Uno and Due are Italian for one and two). This was followed by the launch of Su Casa, an upscale Mexican restaurant, in 1965. Su Casa is located adjacent to Pizzeria Due.

=== Franchising ===
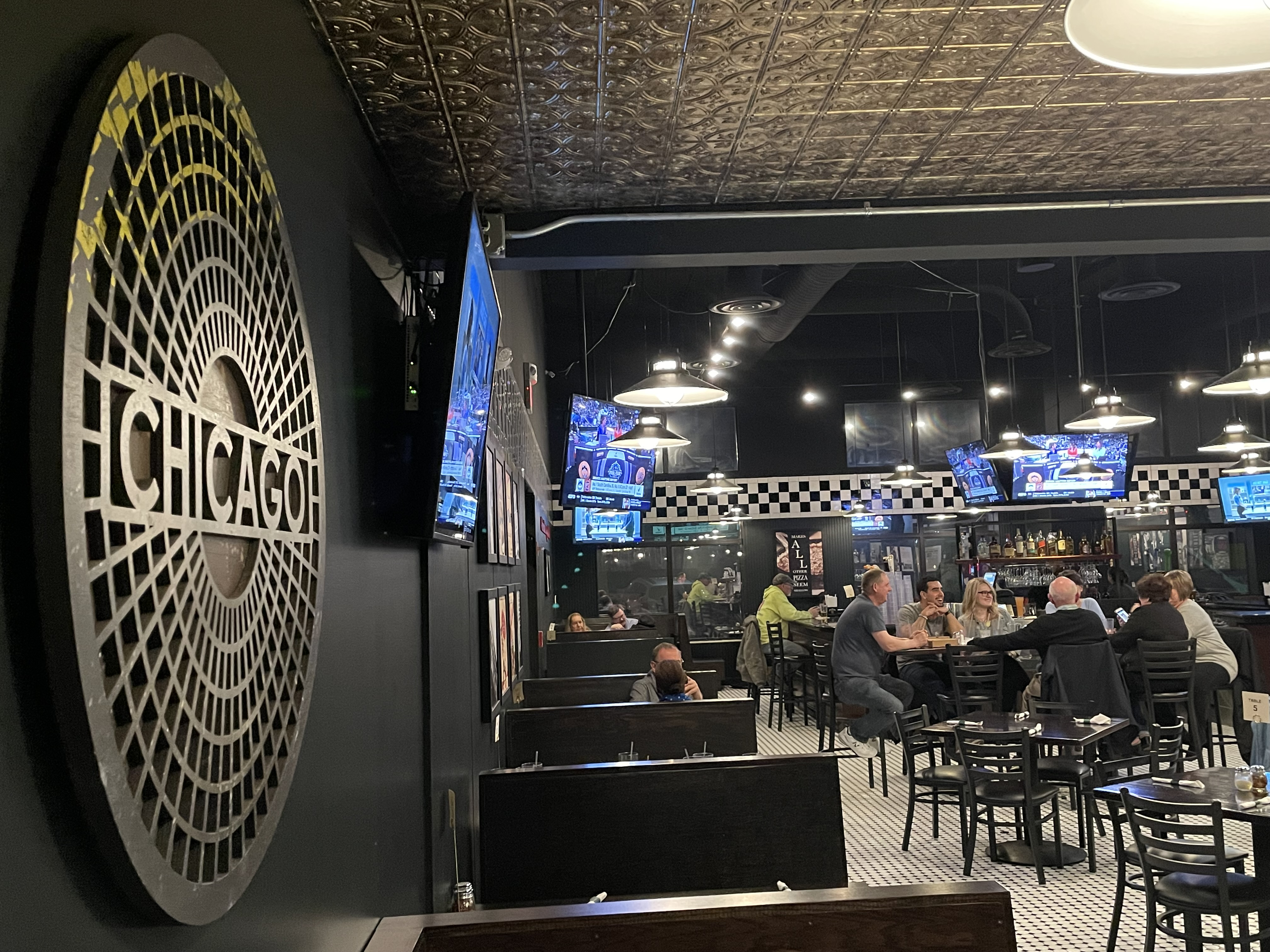
The interior of a newer location of Pizzeria Uno located in Schiller Park (Chicago), IL (near O'Hare airport). The newer locations of Pizzeria Uno have a feel reminiscent of the original Pizzeria Uno in Chicago.

Ike Sewell first licensed the name and concept of the restaurant to the Uno Restaurant Holdings Corporation in 1978 in the Boston area. Beginning with four restaurants in Massachusetts, the chain rapidly expanded over the next decade. The company began franchising in 1980.

In 1988, the Uno Foods division was established and went on to sell frozen and pre-made deep-dish pizza in supermarkets, stadiums, airports, movie theaters, hotel restaurants, and at service plazas

After Ike Sewell's death in 1990, his widow Florence sold the original properties (Uno, Due, and Su Casa) to the Boston-based corporation. CEO Aaron Spencer promised not to tamper with pizza at the original locations.

Entrepreneur magazine ranked it 174th in 2003 and 252nd in 2006 in the magazine's list of the top 500 franchises.

In 2005, the company's press kit claimed "over 200" locations in 32 states, Washington, D.C., Puerto Rico, South Korea and the United Arab Emirates although it is unclear how many of these locations included stands selling Uno Foods products as opposed to full-scale restaurants; most accounts place the maximum number of sit-down full service locations at 130 to 140.

=== New formats and bankruptcy ===
The company launched a fast casual spinoff, called Uno Due Go, in 2008. The new restaurant chain featured pizza, sandwiches, salads, and bakery items. There were four locations as of April 15, 2016, mostly in airports and universities, with one in downtown Boston. By 2020 all locations had closed, with the Boston location closing due to a downturn in business due to COVID-19.

In November 2009, the company announced that after a successful pilot of Uno Express, which offers fast food, it would open at least 160 new Uno Express locations throughout 2010 into 2011. Initial Uno Express locations were inside BJ's Wholesale Club stores, by 2012 all had closed and converted to Dunkin' Donuts or Subway locations.

In January 2010, Uno Restaurant Holdings Corp, controlled by Centre Partners Management LLC, closed 16 of its restaurants and filed for Chapter 11 protection. The company's initial stated intention at the time of the bankruptcy filing was to convert $142 million of Senior Secured Notes due 2011 into the new equity of the company after emergence from Chapter 11. It emerged from bankruptcy on July 26, 2010, after restructuring to eliminate $14.2 million in annual interest payments and reduce total debt from $176.3 million to $40 million.

After bankruptcy, during fiscal 2011, Uno Restaurant Holdings Corp became controlled by Twin Haven Capital Partners. and reached a peak of around 140 locations by 2014.

=== Post bankruptcy and COVID era ===
In May 2017, Uno Restaurant Holdings Corp was sold by Twin Haven Capital Partners to Newport Global Advisors, at the time of the sale having 115 locations, 68 company owned and 47 franchised. Headquarters state Massachusetts, with 23, had the most Uno's restaurants

In 2018, Erik Frederick became CFO, and in 2020 was promoted to CEO.

In February 2023, the Uno Foods division, including the production facility in Brockton, Massachusetts, was sold to Great Kitchen Food Company, a property of Brynnwood Partners.

By November 2023, Uno's had emerged from the depths of the pandemic with 77 restaurants in at least 20 states, Washington, D.C., and Puerto Rico, including 9 in Massachusetts, with overseas units in Saudi Arabia and India and was claimed to have achieved its first net new unit growth since the mid-2000s. More units were franchisees than centrally owned. CEO Frederick's strategies included adding franchises inside of major hotel chains. Additionally, in an interview it was noted that Uno's restaurants tend to adopt a local character rather than a uniform corporate appearance, with a new Winchester, Virginia location sporting George Washington references, and that their goal was to be more of a family room experience than a formal dining venue.

Some regions have been more favorable to Uno than others. While successful in the East Coast and Midwest regions, despite an aggressive push into the Southern and Western markets in the 1990s, those gains were greatly reduced as many locations closed. Information on locations, particularly outside of the USA, is not always clear. In January 2025, the corporate About Us page claimed locations in Honduras and Qatar but listed foreign locations only in Saudi Arabia and India.

=== Format changes at Uno Chicago Grill sit-down locations ===
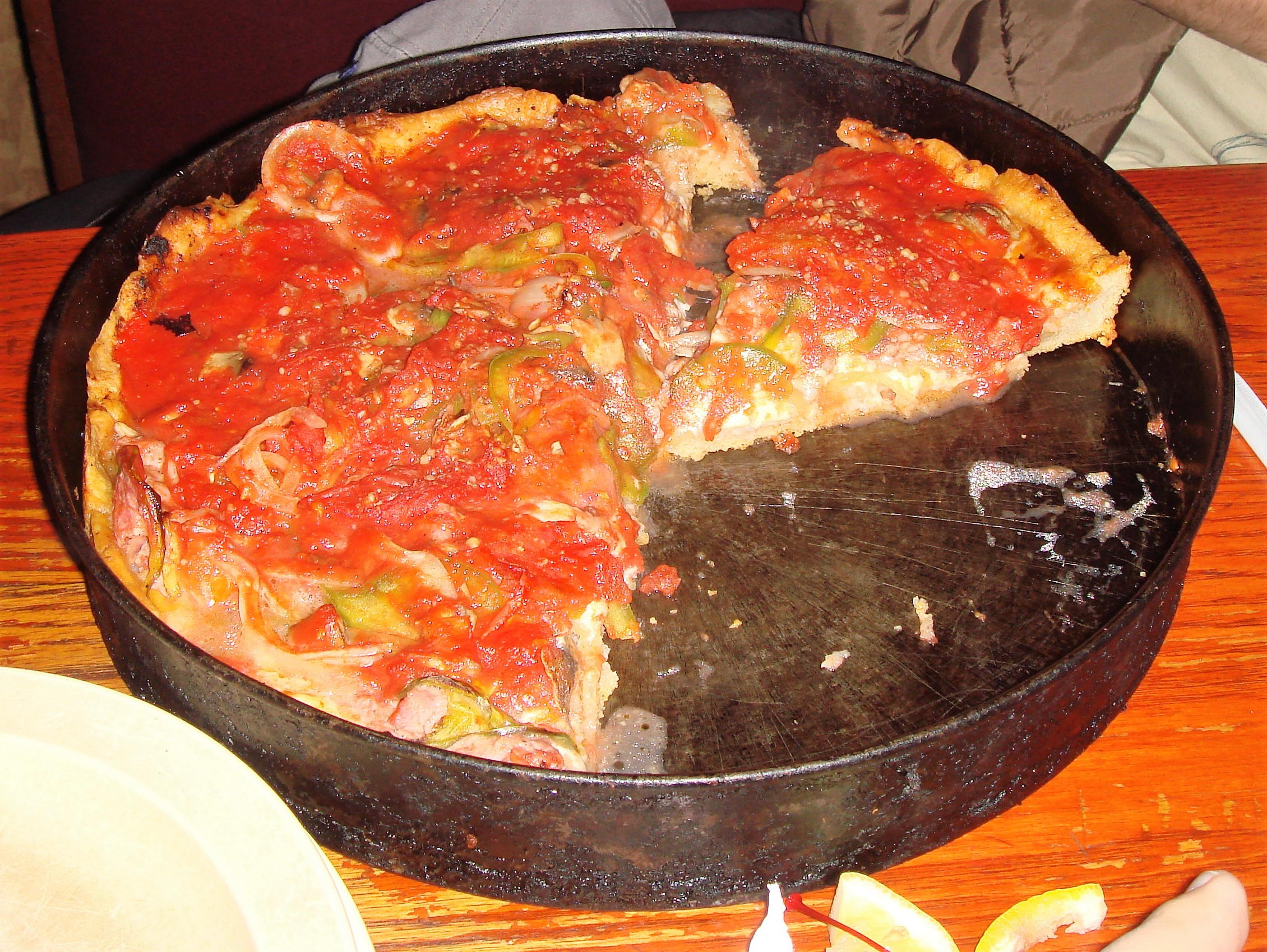
Chicago-style deep dish pizza from the original Pizzeria Uno location

Starting in 1994, Uno's broadened its menu to encompass other dishes. Uno's kitchens were updated, adding sauté stations, grills, and fryers, and the company invested heavily in training.

In 1996, the franchise's beverage list was expanded, and by 1999 so was the portion size, reflecting a trend seen in the industry where customers are buying fewer but larger drinks. New locations were larger and featured a "Chicago warehouse" look.

In 1997, Pizzeria Uno changed its name to Pizzeria Uno, Chicago Bar & Grill; it later simplified the name to Uno Chicago Grill.

The menu update of 2005 still included several of the restaurant's traditional specialties, particularly its deep dish pizza. In the tradition of Chicago's speakeasies, more attention is paid to the bar. Uno's drink list features a dozen wines and a number of specialty drinks, including frozen, mixed and nonalcoholic options.

The expanded menu and format changes were not made at the company's original Chicago locations (Pizzeria Uno and Pizzeria Due).

By 2023, CEO Erik Frederick had trimmed back the menu, stating "You can’t be everything to everyone. If you’ve got a ton of recipes, I don’t care how good they are, you’re going to be inconsistent.”

As of 2025, discontinued past deep dish pizza varieties include Spinoccoli, Spinach, Shroom and Sea Delico (removed and then reintroduced in a slightly different version, the Seafood Delicato).

== See also ==
- List of pizza chains of the United States
