= Chicago Franchise Systems, Inc. =

American restaurant company

Chicago Franchise Systems, Inc., operates Italian-based Chicago-style restaurants in Illinois, Georgia, North Carolina, and Missouri which specialize in Chicago-style cuisine. They have operated since 1990, when they took over the popular Nancy's Pizza chain of pizzerias. Nancy's itself was started in 1971 by Nancy and Rocco Palese. CFS, Inc. operates as a franchisor for Nancy's Pizzerias.

== Nancy's Pizza ==
The first Nancy's Pizza restaurant was opened by Italian Americans Nancy (born Annunziata Scarano) and her husband Rocco Palese in 1974. The Palese family opened and later sold multiple restaurants with different names between 1971 and 1973, before eventually settling on Nancy's Pizza on W. Lawrence Ave. A journalist for the Chicago Sun-Times claims Nancy's Pizza invented the Chicago-style stuffed pizza, but this is disputed.

Nancy and Rocco Palese, both hailing from Potenza, Basilicata, had lived most of their adult lives in Turin, before immigrating with their three children to the United States in 1969. After 18 months in Chicago, Nancy and Rocco opened their first pizza parlor, Guy's Pizza, featuring a popular thin crust pizza. In 1971 friends tried to get the Paleses to experiment with pan pizza. Rather than imitate others, Rocco decided to invent his own pizza, modeled after his family’s recipe for "scarciedda," an Easter specialty cake from his native region, Basilicata, and called his new invention Stuffed Pizza.

In 1974, Rocco and Nancy opened the first Nancy's location in Harwood Heights, Illinois, which could seat only 35 people. Three years later, they opened the first location in Chicago. In 1990, the Palese family sold the name Nancy’s Pizza and all development rights to Dave Howey, the president of Chicago Franchise Systems, Inc., who had been a licensee of the Paleses since 1977. Today, there are 16 Nancy's locations in Illinois, as well as three in the Atlanta, Georgia, area, one in O'Fallon, Missouri, and one in Raleigh, North Carolina.
