= Deep-dish pizza =

Type of pizza originating from Chicago

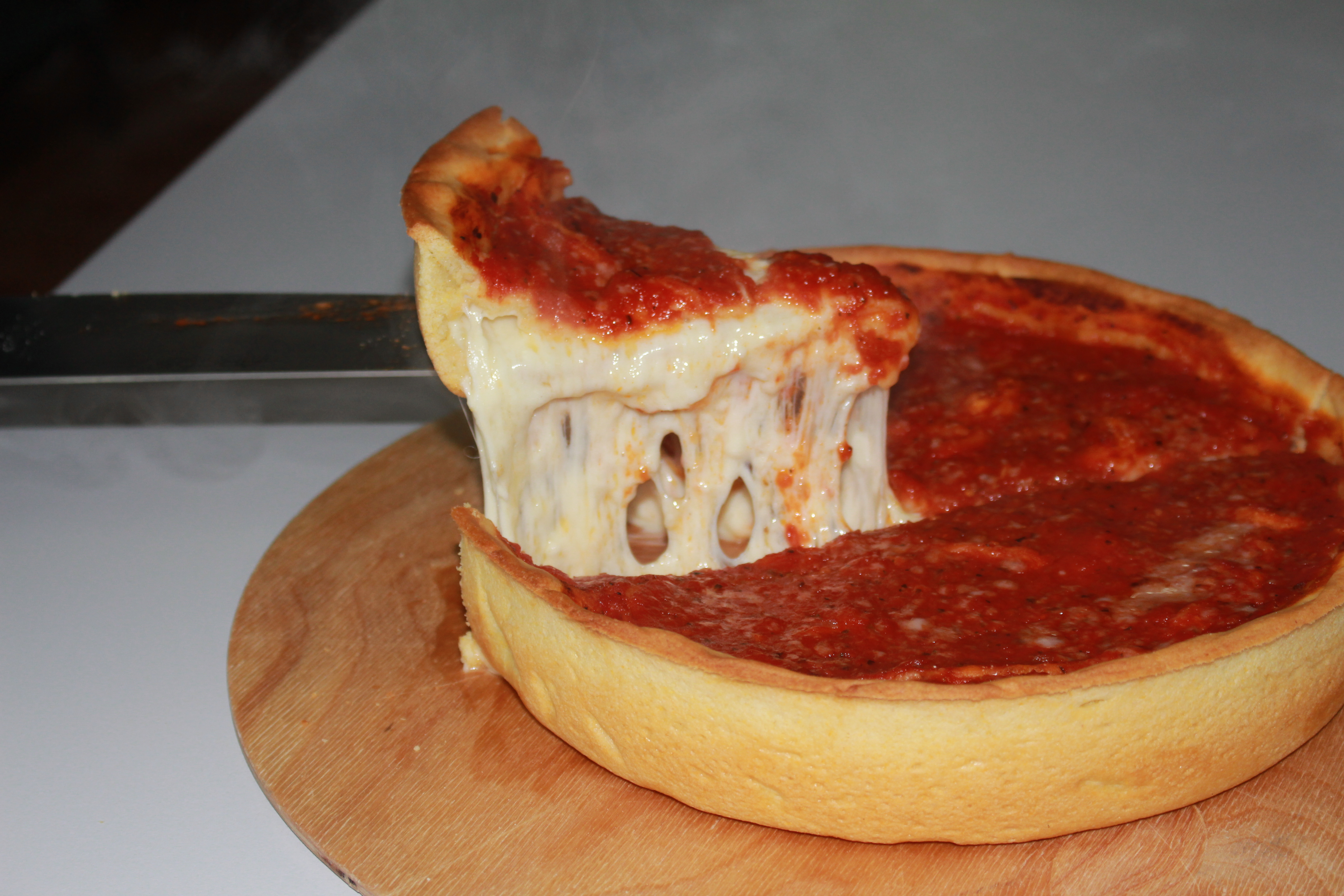
- Deep-dish pizza
- Type: Pizza
- Place of origin: United States
- Region or state: Chicago, Illinois
- Main ingredients: Pizza dough, tomato sauce, cheese

Deep-dish pizza is a type of pizza with a tall outer crust and very large amounts of cheese, with chunky tomato sauce on top of the cheese instead of underneath it. It is strongly associated with Chicago, and is sometimes referred to as Chicago-style pizza.

Similar to but distinct from deep-dish pizza is stuffed pizza, with even more cheese, topped with a second, thinner crust under the tomato sauce.

== History ==
Deep-dish pizza was invented at Pizzeria Uno in Chicago, founded by Ike Sewell and Richard Riccardo in 1943. Riccardo's original recipe for a pizza cooked in a pie pan or cake tin was published in 1945 and included a dough made with scalded milk, butter, and sugar. The restaurant's cook Alice Mae Redmond later adjusted the recipe to be made with water and olive oil and a "secret dough conditioner" to make it stretch better. In the 1960s and '70s, the dough ball became larger, to cover the full sides of the pan, with a higher fat percentage. Redmond later worked at Gino's East, founded in 1966, where she made a fattier, biscuit-like dough.

Uno's original pizza chef Rudy Malnati has also been credited for the development of the recipe. Rudy's sons Lou and Rudy Jr., who also worked at Pizzeria Uno, later respectively founded Lou Malnati's Pizzeria in 1971 and Pizano's in 1991, both also known for their deep-dish pizzas.

The thick pizza crust, sometimes made with cornmeal for texture, may be parbaked before the toppings are added to give it greater spring. In traditional recipes, the top of the crust is layered with meats and/or vegetables and mozzarella cheese while the sides rise to the top of the pan, and then a layer of crushed tomatoes is ladled over the top and the whole pizza is baked to completion.

Deep-dish pizza

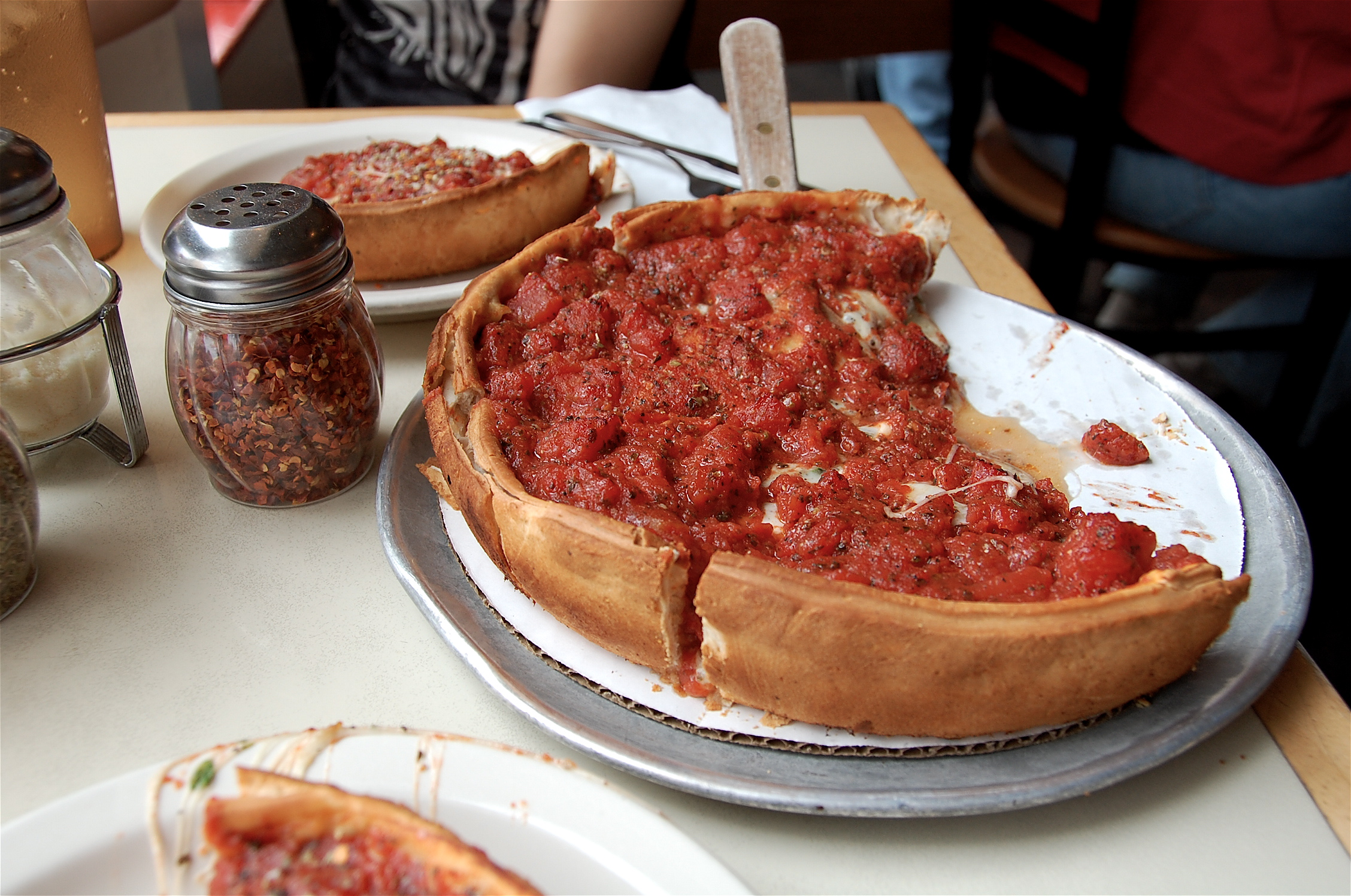
A deep-dish pizza from Zachary's Chicago Pizza [wd] in Oakland, California

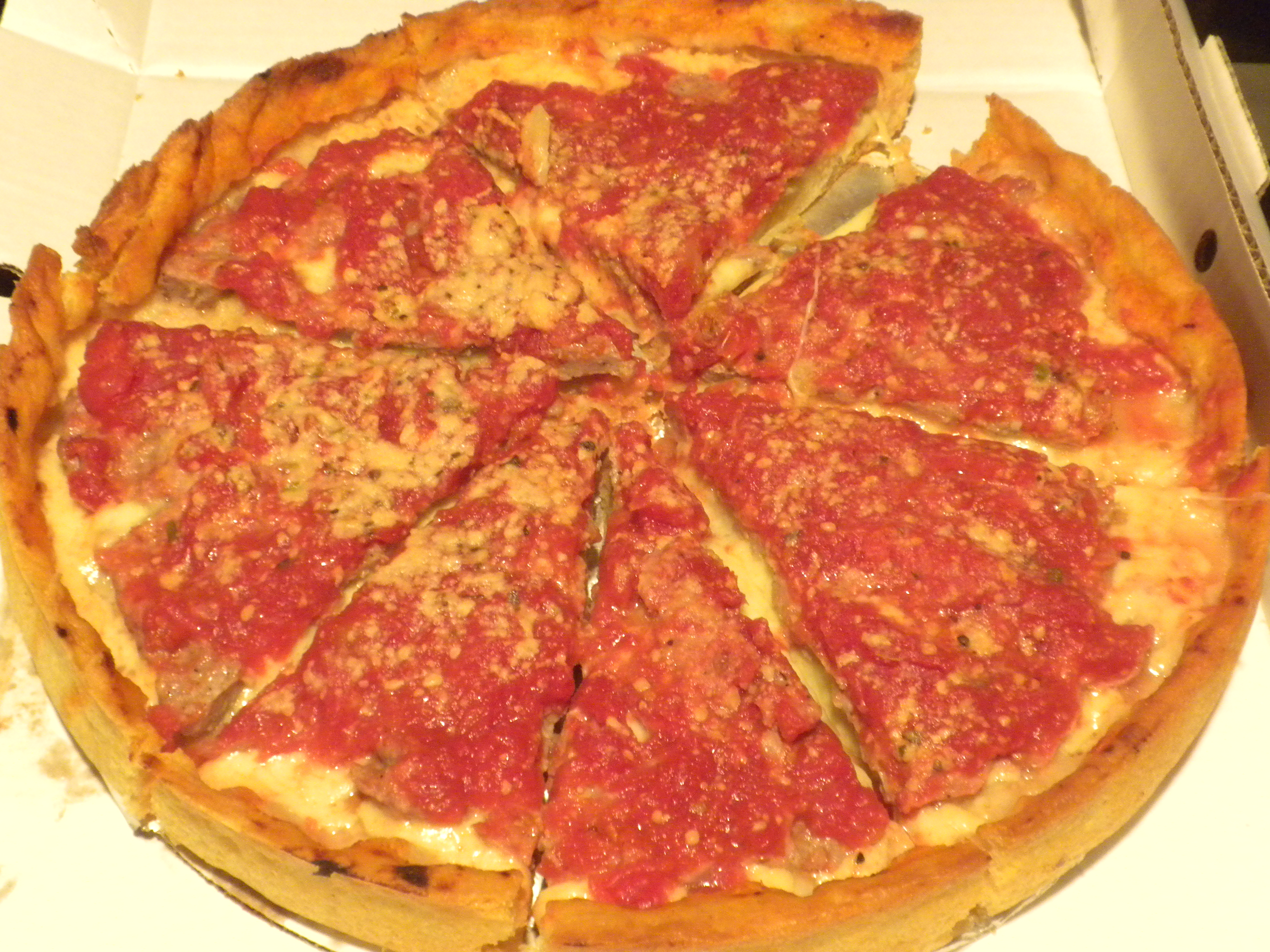
Deep-dish pizza from Lou Malnati's

== Stuffed pizza variation ==
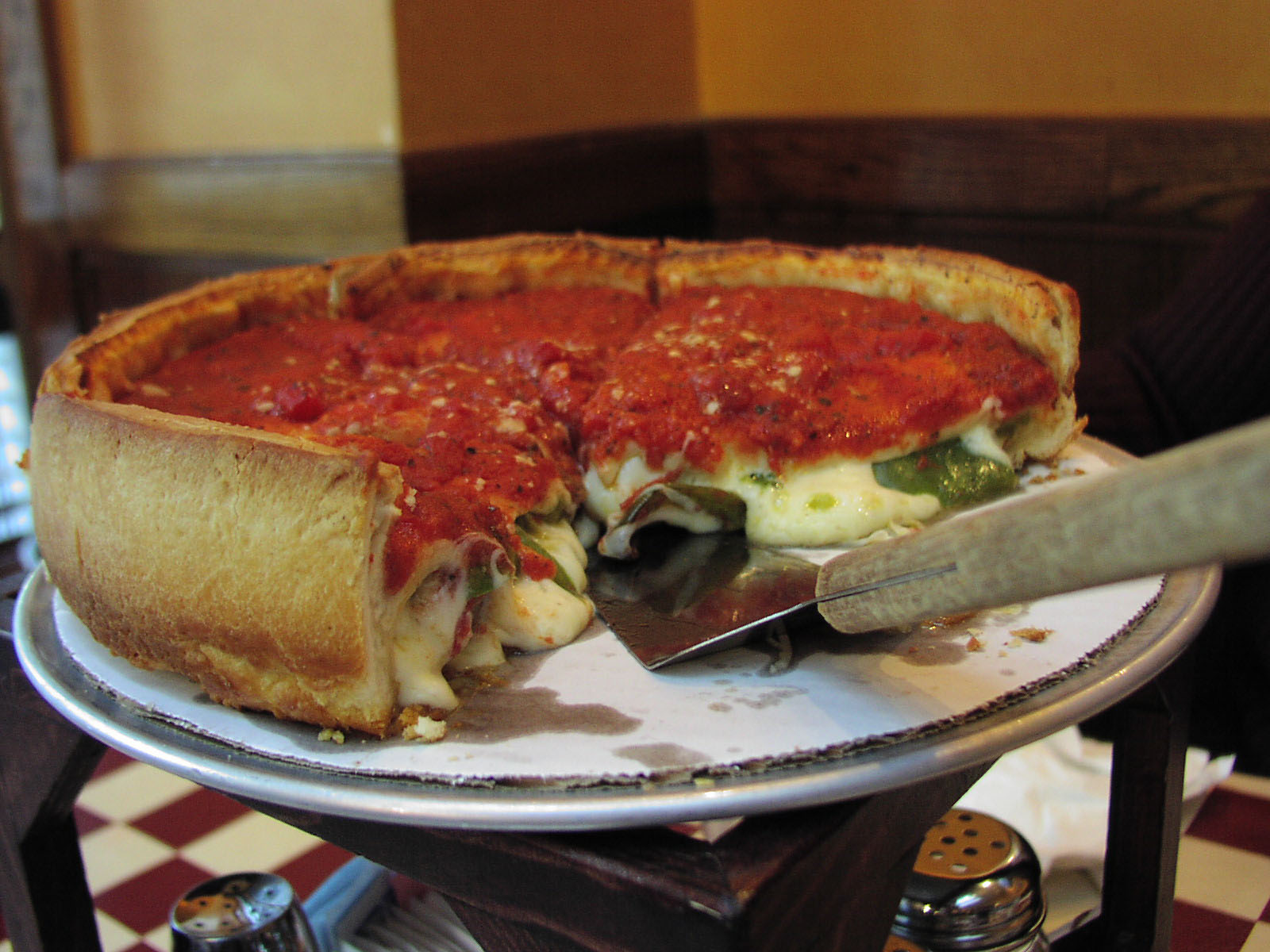
Stuffed pizza from Giordano's

By the mid-1970s, two Chicago chains, Nancy's Pizza, founded by Rocco Palese, and Giordano's Pizzeria, operated by brothers Efren and Joseph Boglio, began experimenting with deep-dish pizza and created the stuffed pizza. Palese based his creation on his mother's recipe for scarcedda, an Italian Easter pie from his hometown of Potenza in Basilicata at the far southern end of the Italian Peninsula, more commonly known in Italy as pizza rustica Lucana. Stuffed pizzas are typically deeper, have another layer of dough covering the toppings, and have more cheese than standard deep-dish pizza, while other restaurants' deep-dish pizzas tend to have more sauce.

== See also ==
- Pizza in the United States
- Pan pizza
