= New Glarus =

New Glarus may refer to:

- New Glarus, Wisconsin, a village in Green County, Wisconsin
- New Glarus (town), Wisconsin, a town in Green County, Wisconsin
- New Glarus Brewing Company, a brewing company located in New Glarus
- New Glarus Town Hall, the town hall of New Glarus, registered to the National Register of Historic Places
- New Glarus Woods State Park, a Wisconsin state park in Green County, Wisconsin
