= New Glarus station =

New Glarus
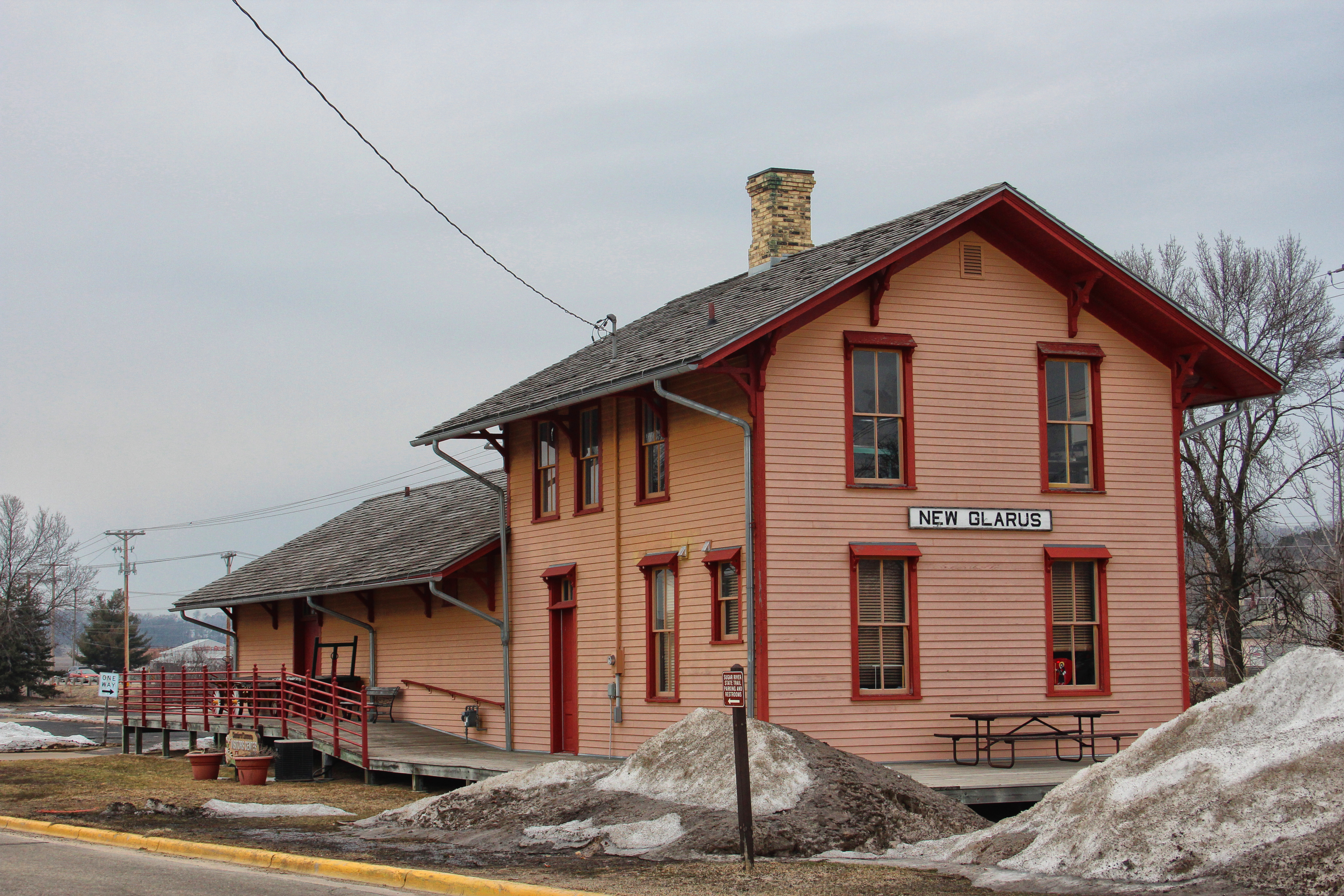

General information
- Location: 418 Railroad Street, New Glarus, Wisconsin 53574
- System: Former Milwaukee Road passenger rail station

History
- Opened: 1887

Services
Preceding station	Milwaukee Road	Following station
Terminus	New Glarus – Brodhead	Monticello, WI toward Brodhead
- Chicago, Milwaukee and Saint Paul Railroad Depot
- U.S. National Register of Historic Places
- Location within Wisconsin Location within the United States
- Location: 418 Railroad St. New Glarus, Wisconsin
- Coordinates: 42.81563°N 89.63258°W
- Built: 1887
- NRHP reference No.: 00000359
- Added to NRHP: April 6, 2000
Location

The Chicago, Milwaukee and Saint Paul Railroad Depot is located in New Glarus, Wisconsin. It was added to the National Register of Historic Places in 2000.

New Glarus was settled in 1845 by Swiss immigrants from the Canton of Glarus, with many farming. The wagon roads were not good at that time, and it was not easy to get New Glarus' goods (wheat, cheese) to market, especially during wet periods. In 1856 the Milwaukee and Mississippi Railroad reached Brodhead, and Monroe the following year, but New Glarus was still 20 miles from a railroad. By 1880 the Milwaukee Road had bought rights to this corridor and constructed a spur from Brodhead to Albany, but it was still 16 miles from New Glarus. In 1884 the Town of New Glarus had 18 cheese factories. New Glarus offered $20,000 to the Milwaukee Road to build a track to town, but the railroad wanted a $40,000 contribution for that favor.

In 1886, the Chicago, Madison and Northern Railroad started building a competing line which missed New Glarus by four miles. Concerned about the competition, the Milwaukee Road finally extended its line from Brodhead, making New Glarus its new terminus. Construction of the new 16-mile segment began in the spring of 1887 and was completed by the end of August. Two trains ran per day, with depots at Albany, Monticello, and New Glarus. At New Glarus, the Milwaukee Road built a turntable, an engine house, stockyards, and other structures along with the depot.

The depot generally follows one of the standard plans used by the Milwaukee Road at that time for depots in smallish towns. It is a combination depot, built to handle both passenger service and freight service. The building is wooden, with Late Victorian trim. The passenger end contained a waiting room, two bathrooms, and an agent's room with ticket window. Above the passenger end, the second story contained living quarters, with a kitchen, living room, and bedrooms. The depot's original cost was $8,000.

After the railroad reached town there was a little burst of growth, but not the boom that some other communities saw, likely due to the depressions of the 1890s, but things soon picked up and the railroad served New Glarus for many years, until the automobile bled away most of its business and the Milwaukee Road abandoned the line to New Glarus in 1972.

Currently, the building houses the New Glarus Chamber of Commerce office and the Sugar River State Trail office, as well as a visitors center.
