= Monroe, Wisconsin =

- City
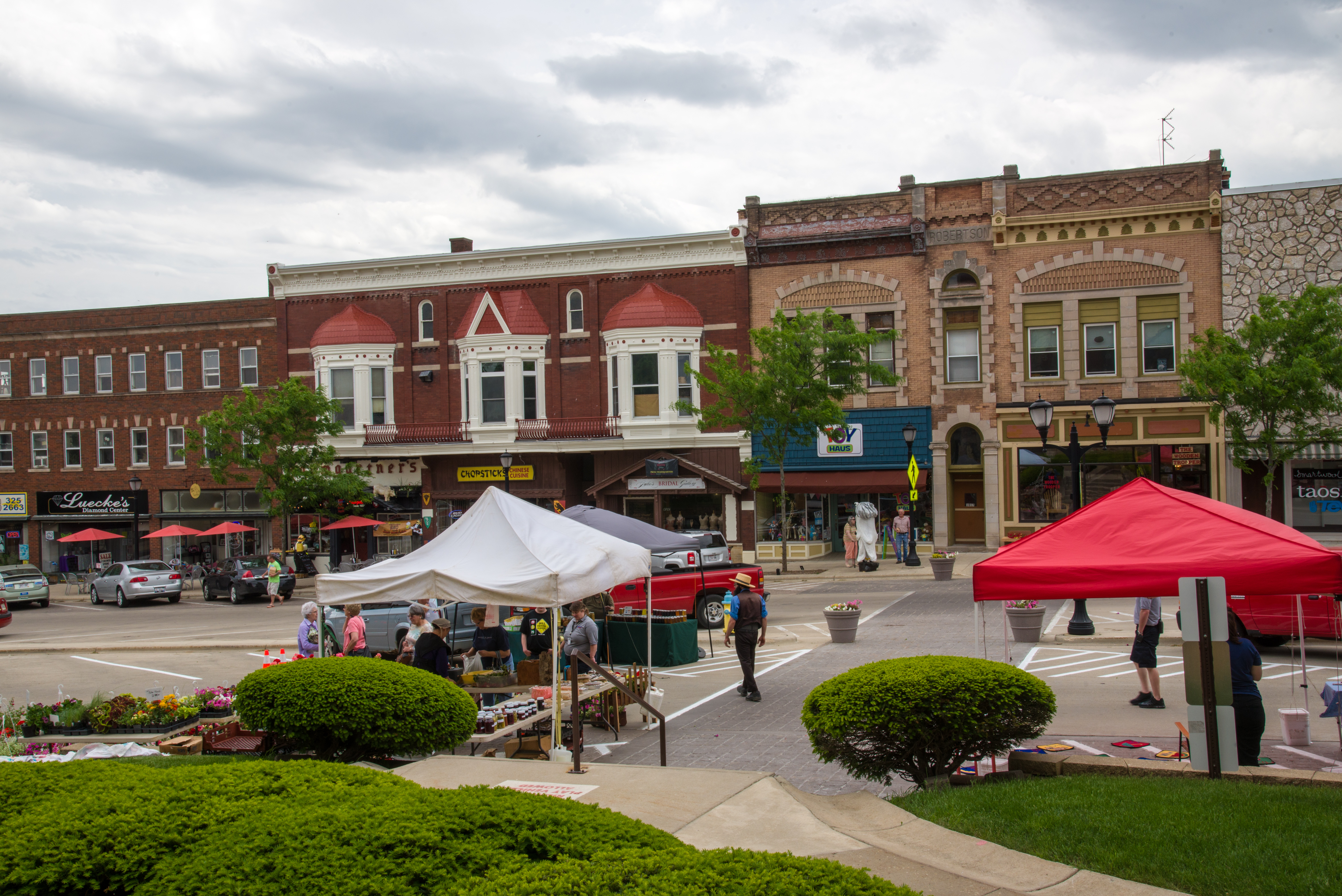
- Monroe Commercial District

- Seal
- Nickname: Cheese Capital of the USA
- Location of Monroe in Green County, Wisconsin

- Location within Wisconsin Location within the United States
- Coordinates: 42°36′N 89°38′W
- Country: United States
- State: Wisconsin
- County: Green

Government
  - Type: Council-Manager Government
  - Mayor: Tom Miller

Area
  - Total: 5.60 sq mi (14.51 km^{2})
  - Land: 5.60 sq mi (14.51 km^{2})
  - Water: 0 sq mi (0.00 km^{2})
- Elevation: 1,056 ft (322 m)

Population (2020)
  - Total: 10,661
  - Density: 1,903.8/sq mi (735.1/km^{2})
- Time zone: UTC-6 (Central (CST))
  - Summer (DST): UTC-5 (CDT)
- ZIP Code: 53566
- Area code: 608
- FIPS code: 55–53750
- GNIS feature ID: 1569657
- Website: www.cityofmonroe.org

Monroe is a city in Green County, Wisconsin, United States, and its county seat. The population was 10,661 at the 2020 census. The city is bordered by the Town of Monroe to the north and the Town of Clarno to the south. It is nicknamed the "Cheese Capital of the USA".

== Geography ==
According to the United States Census Bureau, Monroe has an area of 5.6 square miles (14.50 km^{2}), all land.

== Demographics ==
Historical population
Census	Pop.	Note	%±
1860	939		—
1870	3,408		262.9%
1880	3,293		−3.4%
1890	3,768		14.4%
1900	3,927		4.2%
1910	4,410		12.3%
1920	4,788		8.6%
1930	5,015		4.7%
1940	6,182		23.3%
1950	7,037		13.8%
1960	8,050		14.4%
1970	8,654		7.5%
1980	10,027		15.9%
1990	10,241		2.1%
2000	10,843		5.9%
2010	10,827		−0.1%
2020	10,661		−1.5%
U.S. Decennial Census

=== 2020 census ===
As of the 2020 census, Monroe had a population of 10,661. The population density was 1,903.8 inhabitants per square mile (735.1/km^{2}). The median age was 41.9 years. 21.2% of residents were under the age of 18 and 22.0% of residents were 65 years of age or older. For every 100 females there were 95.5 males, and for every 100 females age 18 and over there were 92.2 males age 18 and over.

100.0% of residents lived in urban areas, while 0.0% lived in rural areas.

There were 4,890 households in Monroe, of which 23.9% had children under the age of 18 living in them. Of all households, 39.7% were married-couple households, 22.4% were households with a male householder and no spouse or partner present, and 30.2% were households with a female householder and no spouse or partner present. About 39.1% of all households were made up of individuals and 18.2% had someone living alone who was 65 years of age or older.

There were 5,126 housing units at an average density of 915.4 per square mile (353.4/km^{2}), of which 4.6% were vacant. The homeowner vacancy rate was 0.7% and the rental vacancy rate was 4.1%.

Racial composition as of the 2020 census
Race	Number	Percent
White	9,512	89.2%
Black or African American	76	0.7%
American Indian and Alaska Native	43	0.4%
Asian	75	0.7%
Native Hawaiian and Other Pacific Islander	1	0.0%
Some other race	432	4.1%
Two or more races	522	4.9%
Hispanic or Latino (of any race)	807	7.6%

=== 2010 census ===
As of the census of 2010, there were 10,827 people, 4,810 households, and 2,781 families residing in the city. The population density was 2,241.6 inhabitants per square mile (865.5/km^{2}). There were 5,101 housing units at an average density of 1,056.1 per square mile (407.8/km^{2}). The racial makeup of the city was 94.8% White, 0.6% African American, 0.2% Native American, 0.7% Asian, 2.6% from other races, and 1.1% from two or more races. Hispanic or Latino people of any race were 4.9% of the population.

There were 4,810 households, of which 27.4% had children under the age of 18 living with them, 42.8% were married couples living together, 10.7% had a female householder with no husband present, 4.3% had a male householder with no wife present, and 42.2% were non-families. 36.4% of all households were made up of individuals, and 16.9% had someone living alone who was 65 years of age or older. The average household size was 2.22 and the average family size was 2.87.

The median age in the city was 41.1 years. 22.5% of residents were under the age of 18; 8% were between the ages of 18 and 24; 24% were from 25 to 44; 26.8% were from 45 to 64; and 18.8% were 65 years of age or older. The gender makeup of the city was 47.9% male and 52.1% female.

=== 2000 census ===
As of 2000 the median income for a household in the city was $36,922, and the median income for a family was $47,361. Males had a median income of $32,050 versus $22,112 for females. The per capita income for the city was $21,657. About 2.4% of families and 5.4% of the population were below the poverty line, including 4.3% of those under age 18 and 8.1% of those age 65 or over.

== Cheese Days ==
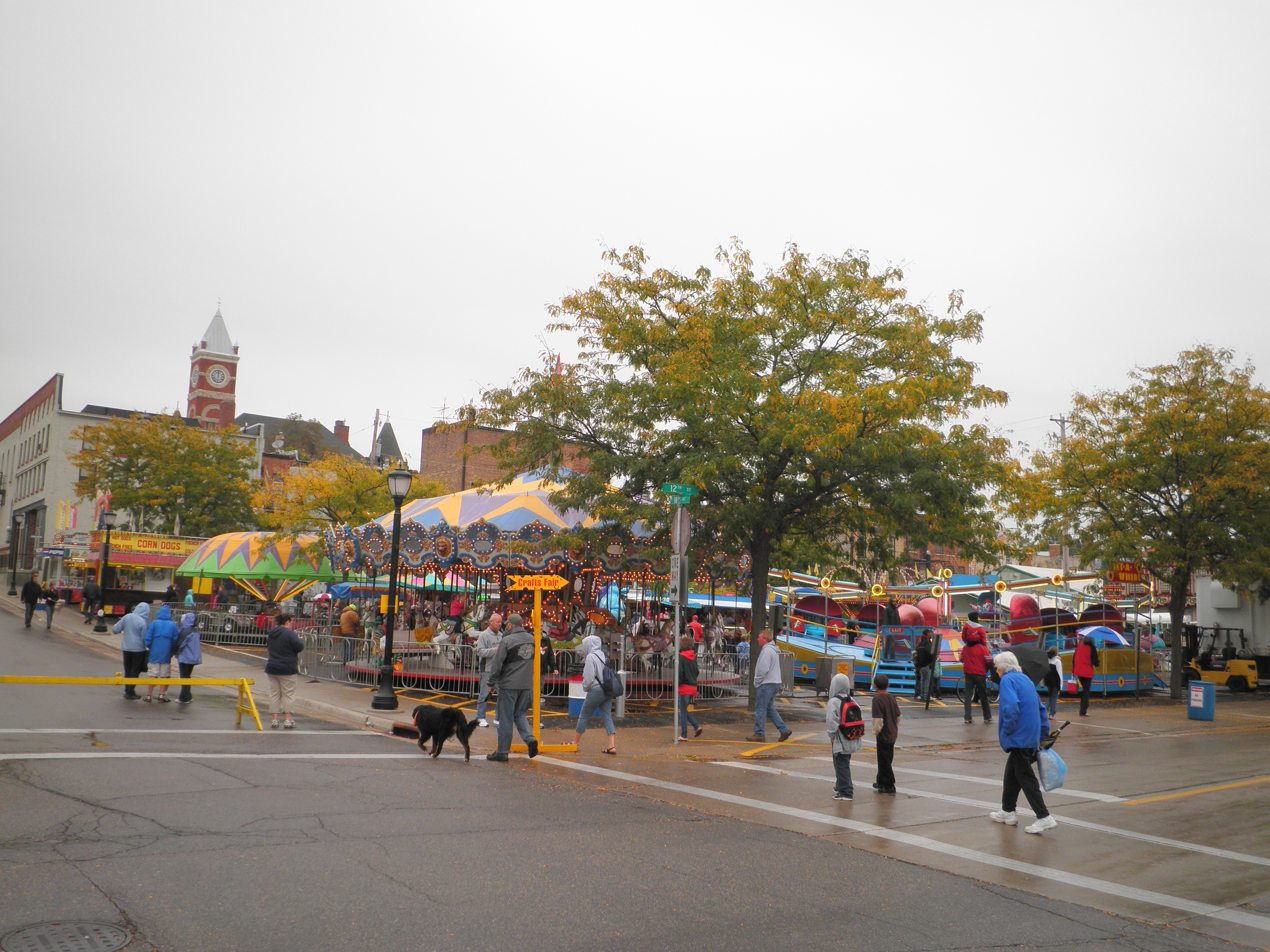
Cheese Days festival

Cheese Days is a biennial celebration of cheese and the dairy industry in Monroe. Established in 1914, the weekend-long event typically occurs on the third weekend in September of even-numbered years in the historic downtown area known as "the Square". The festivities include carnival rides, a variety of local food, restaurant, craft, and club stands, and live, traditional Swiss-Germanic music (including polkas and waltzes), culminating in a two-hour parade on Sunday afternoon. Over 100,000 people come for the festivities throughout the three-day event. Cheese Days was not held in 1918, 1942, 1944, or 2020.

== Parks and recreation ==
Monroe's parks include Twining Park, which has the city's Swiss bandshell; Recreation Park, home to the city swimming pool; and Honey Creek Park, the site of a skate park. Monroe is the eastern starting point of the Cheese Country Trail, a 47-mile multi-purpose recreational path, and the Badger State Trail, a bicycle and pedestrian-only trail in summer and an ATV/snowmobile trail in winter. The "Cheese Trail" extends from Mineral Point to Monroe, while the Badger State Trail runs from the state line to Madison and connects to the Jane Addams Trail in Illinois. Both are former railway corridors. Monroe is also home to Stateline Ice and Community Expo (SLICE), Green County's only indoor ice rink.

Badger State Trail runs from Madison through Fitchburg past the Ice Age National Scenic Trail Montrose segment, Belleville, New Glarus, and crosses the Sugar River State Trail before reaching Monroe, and then continues to the Illinois border, where it meets the Jane Addams Trail, which continues to Freeport, Illinois.

== Education ==
The School District of Monroe is Green County's largest. It serves around 2,700 pupils and has an open enrollment procedure. The district maintains Monroe High School, home of the Cheesemakers in the Rock Valley Conference, Monroe Middle School, Abraham Lincoln Accelerated Learning Academy, Parkside Elementary School, and Northside Elementary School. St. Victor Catholic elementary school offers grades K through 5. Monroe has a campus of Blackhawk Technical College, the community's sole institution of post-secondary education.

== Transportation ==
- WIS 11 runs around Monroe on the bypass.
- WIS 59 ends in the northeast corner of the city near the Monroe Clinic.
- WIS 69 runs on the bypass for 1 mile with WIS 81 and WIS 11.
- WIS 81 runs around Monroe on the bypass.

Monroe Municipal Airport (KEFT) serves the city and surrounding communities.

Wisconsin and Southern Railroad serves the city with freight service. A branch line from Janesville ends at Badger State Ethanol.

== Notable people ==
- Henry Adams, Wisconsin state representative and senator
- Bob Anderegg, professional basketball player
- Ken Behring, former owner of the Seattle Seahawks
- James Bintliff, Union Army general
- John Bolender, Wisconsin state representative
- Ira B. Bradford, Wisconsin state representative
- Evelene Brodstone, one of the highest paid female executives of the 1920s
- Dick Campbell, singer, songwriter, movie director
- Edwin Copeland, botanist and founder of the University of the Philippines Los Banos College of Agriculture
- David G. Deininger, jurist and legislator
- A. Clarke Dodge, Wisconsin state representative and businessman
- Joe Dodge, jazz musician
- Alice Righter Edmiston, artist
- G. Fred Galli, cheesemaker and legislator
- John C. Hall, Wisconsin state senator and physician
- Andre Jacque, Wisconsin state representative
- Janet Jennings, nurse during the Spanish–American War
- Harry A. Keegan, Wisconsin state representative
- Nathan J. Lindsay, U.S. Air Force major general
- William H. H. Llewellyn, New Mexico state representative, member of the Rough Riders
- Joe Lobdell, professional football player
- John Luchsinger, legislator, writer, jurist
- Willis Ludlow, Wisconsin state representative and mayor of Monroe
- Ric Mathias, NFL player
- Perry A.C. Reed, Nebraska state senator
- William Rittenhouse, Wisconsin state senator
- Ray H. Schoonover, Wisconsin state representative, sheriff, and businessman
- Tom Tennant, MLB player
- Robin G. Tornow, U.S. Air Force general
- Charles Treat, U.S. Army general, Army Distinguished Service Medal recipient
- Joseph B. Treat, Wisconsin state senator and chairman of the Republican State Central Committee
- Nathaniel Treat, Maine state representative
- Nathaniel B. Treat, Wisconsin state representative
- Nathan Farragut Twining, Chairman of the Joint Chiefs of Staff, United States Air Force
- Merrill B. Twining, United States Marine Corps general
- Don S. Wenger, U.S. Air Force major general
- Walter S. Wescott, Wisconsin state representative and senator
- Francis H. West, Union Army general
- George Otto Wirz, Roman Catholic bishop
- Edwin E. Woodman, Wisconsin state senator
- Art Young, cartoonist and writer
