= New Glarus Woods State Park =

State park in Wisconsin, United States

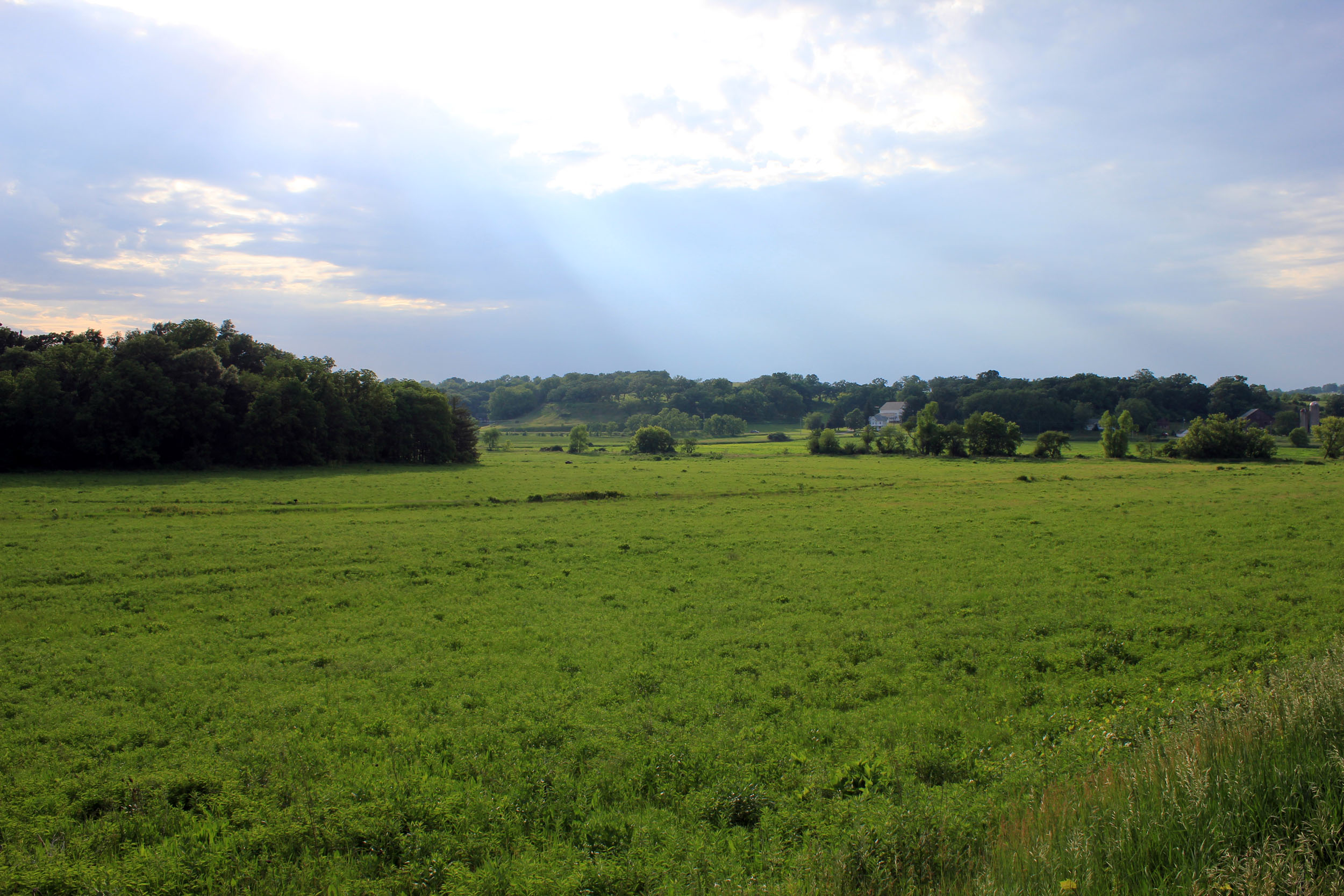

- Location within Wisconsin Location within the United States
- Interactive map of New Glarus Woods State Park
- Location: Green County, Wisconsin, United States
- Coordinates: 42°47′20″N 89°37′56″W
- Area: 435 acres (176 ha)
- Established: 1934
- Administrator: Wisconsin Department of Natural Resources
- Website: Official website
- Wisconsin State Parks

New Glarus Woods State Park is a state park in Green County, Wisconsin, United States. The 431-acre (174 ha) park features rolling hills covered by a mix of forest and prairie just south of the village of New Glarus. The park offers biking, camping and hiking trails. The Sugar River State Trail connects to the park, making the park accessible by bike. This trail also connects to the Badger State Trail.
