= Cannonball Path =

Bike trail in Madison, Wisconsin, US

- Length: 4 mi (6.4 km)
- Location: Dane County, Wisconsin
- Trailheads: Fish Hatchery Rd, Madison, Wisconsin; Arrowhead Park, Fitchburg, Wisconsin

Cannonball Path is a 4-mile long shared-use trail in Madison, Wisconsin. It runs on a former Chicago and North Western railway line. The trail begins at a junction with the Military Ridge State Trail, Southwest Bike Path, Badger State Trail, and Capital City State Trail. It ends at Fish Hatchery Road and will eventually connect to the existing Wingra Creek Bike Trail.

The first phase of the Cannonball Path was completed in 2011. It was cited as having the first bicycle roundabout in the Madison area. The path also includes a bridge that goes over the Beltline.

In 2014, Adams Outdoor Advertising sued the city of Madison alleging the path's infrastructure blocked the view of one of its billboards. The case was dismissed, with the Wisconsin Court of Appeals upholding the dismissal in 2017. The Wisconsin Supreme Court further upheld the dismissal in 2018.

The path, which connects Fitchburg with Madison, has had multiple proposed plans to connect further to the Wingra Creek Path. The Wisconsin Office of the Commissioner of Railroads rejected the first plan for the extension, as they would have involved railroad crossings. In 2024, it was reported that the city would not be proceeding with an appeal of the decision. In 2026, plans were approved with alternate route which connects along Fish Hatchery Road instead of along the railroad. Construction work to connect the two paths began in August 2026.
