= Badger State Trail =

Rail trail in Wisconsin, U.S.

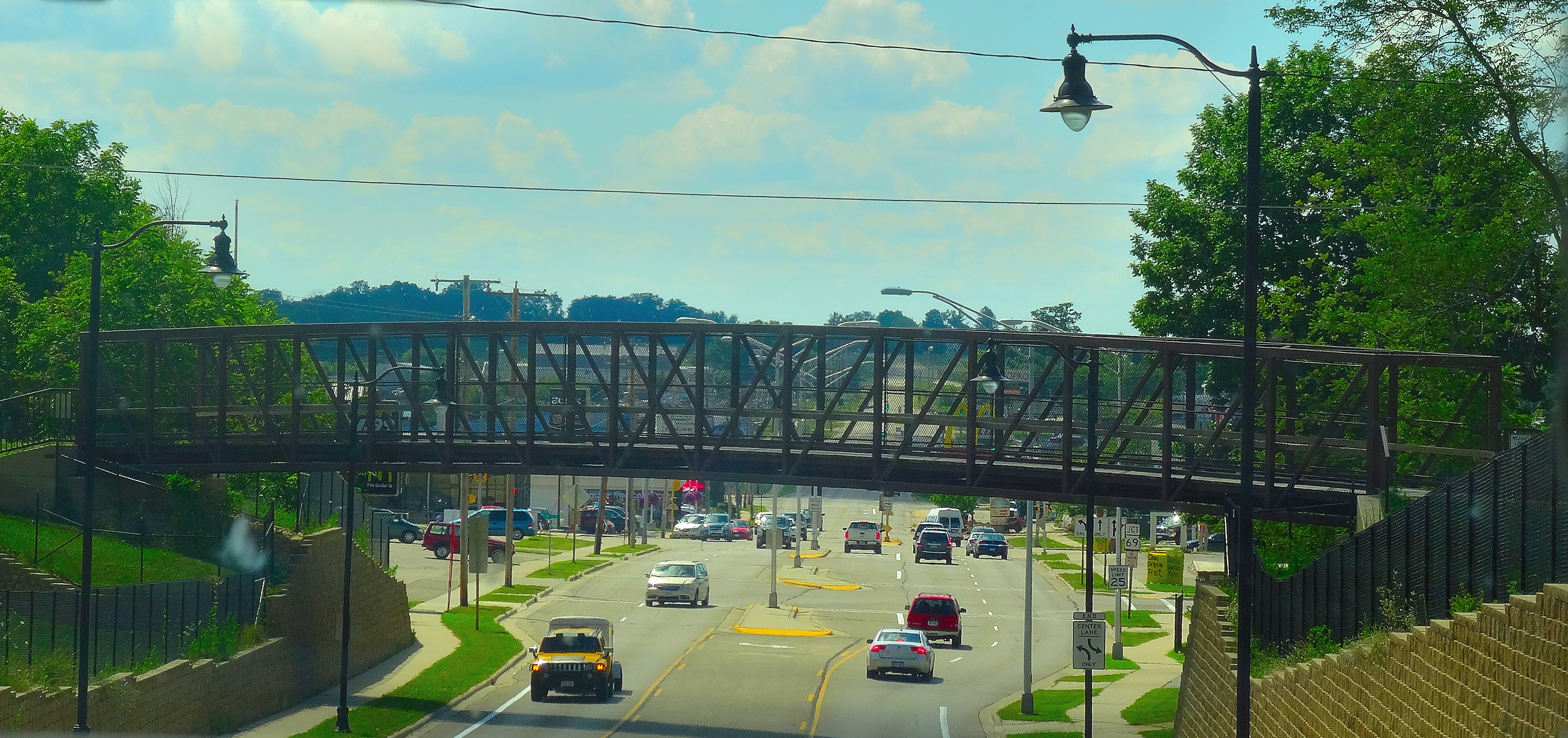
- The Badger State Trail crossing over a street via a bridge in Monroe, WI, in 2015
- Length: 40 mi (64 km)
- Location: southern Wisconsin, USA
- Established: 2007; 19 years ago
- Use: cycling, hiking, ATV and snowmobiling
- Surface: northern end paved; most is crushed limestone

The Badger State Trail is a 40-mile (64 km) bicycle trail in south central Wisconsin. The trail leads from the Wisconsin – Illinois state line to Madison passing through, from south to north, Monroe, Monticello, Belleville and Fitchburg. Near Monticello, the trail passes through the 1,200-foot (370 m) long, unlit Stewart Tunnel constructed in 1887. The trail was officially opened July 8, 2007.

== History ==
=== Rail history ===
The main route of the trail follows a former rail line that was originally built by the Chicago, Madison and Northern Railroad and opened in 1887, with the first official train traveling the full route in February 1888. The line eventually came under the control of the Illinois Central Gulf Railroad. In the latter 20th century, it was operated by Wisconsin and Calumet Railroad then last saw regular Wisconsin and Southern Railroad freight service in the early 1980s.

=== Trail history ===
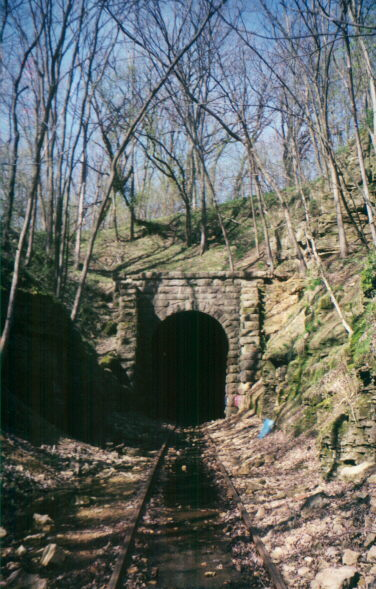
The portal of Stewart Tunnel shortly before the rails were removed.

Feasibility studies for the trail began in December 1976. Approval for the trail came in 1997. Some objections were raised in 1999 when both the Green County Board and the South Central Wisconsin Rail Transit Commission passed votes for the rail trail conversion. In 2000, the state Natural Resources Board purchased the right-of-way to develop the trail. Portions of the trail were opened for winter activities. Republican state legislators raised objections to the DNR spending and stewardship in 2003 but were unable to block the $499,000 allocated for improvements to the trail. In October 2003, the Wisconsin Building Commission approved spending $303,000 toward restoration of the Stewart Tunnel; repairs to the tunnel began in 2005. The Wisconsin DNR held a vote for final approvals of the trail in February 2006. Fitchburg had requested $1 million in funding to pave the trail within the city in 2006 and again in 2008, and was denied funding for a connection to the Cannonball Trail (an extension of the Military Ridge State Trail); the city was also denied funding for a service hub at the junction of the Badger State, Capitol City and Cannonball trails.

The trail was officially opened with a ribbon cutting ceremony in Belleville on July 8, 2007. Although the 6-mile-long (9.7 km) section through Fitchburg wouldn't be paved on the trail's opening, in its first year of use as a recreational trail, the Wisconsin Department of Natural Resources estimated that, despite a temporary closure in August due to flooding, it was used by 31,000 people between July 1 and December 31, 2007, with 6,000 snowmobilers in December.

State and local representatives approved a spending measure to pave the northern section in September 2008. Finally on November 18, 2009, the Building Commission unanimously approved funding to complete the section in Fitchburg, allowing $497,000 to be borrowed in stewardship. In April 2010, the city of Fitchburg accepted bids to pave the trail and repair bridges and level crossings within the city.

In 2014, the northern end of the trail, where it intersects with both the South West Bike Path and the Cannonball Trail, was rebuilt to make the first bicycle roundabout in the Madison area. The roundabout has come to be known as the Velo UnderRound.

Strong thunderstorms caused flooding and tree damage along the trail in 2017, forcing closures until the damage could be repaired.

In 2019, the DNR closed the Stewart Tunnel for safety reasons, due to "sections of loose and falling rocks from the ceiling and side walls." The tunnel remains closed to this day.

In summer 2020, a short section of the trail in Fitchburg, where it crosses McKee Road, was temporarily closed. The closure was to allow crews to rebuild the street and to install a bridge for the trail over the road.

== Notable incidents ==
In August 2022, a cord was tied across a bridge. The suspect was convicted of two counts of second-degree recklessly endangering safety.

== Trail usage and connections ==
Although snowmobiles and ATVs had been allowed on the trail in its first year, many bicyclists objected to the use of motorized vehicles on the trail saying that they were degrading the trail's limestone surface. The Bicycle Federation of Wisconsin sponsored three candidates in November 2007 for open seats on the Badger State Trail Friends Group, and all three were elected. Horse-riding enthusiasts also pressed for permission to use the trail.

A state trail pass is required to bicycle or ski the trail, and the path is patrolled by Wisconsin Department of Natural Resources rangers. The trail is closed nightly from 11:00pm to 6:00am by state law. The Badger State Trail connects to the Capital City Trail in Madison, and the Jane Addams Trail at the state line (leading to Freeport, Illinois) which will connect to the proposed 500-mile (800 km) Grand Illinois Trail System. Along the way, the Badger State Trail crosses the Sugar River Trail in Monticello and connects with the Cheese Country Trail in Monroe. Proposals have been made to also connect it to the Oregon Rotary Trail.

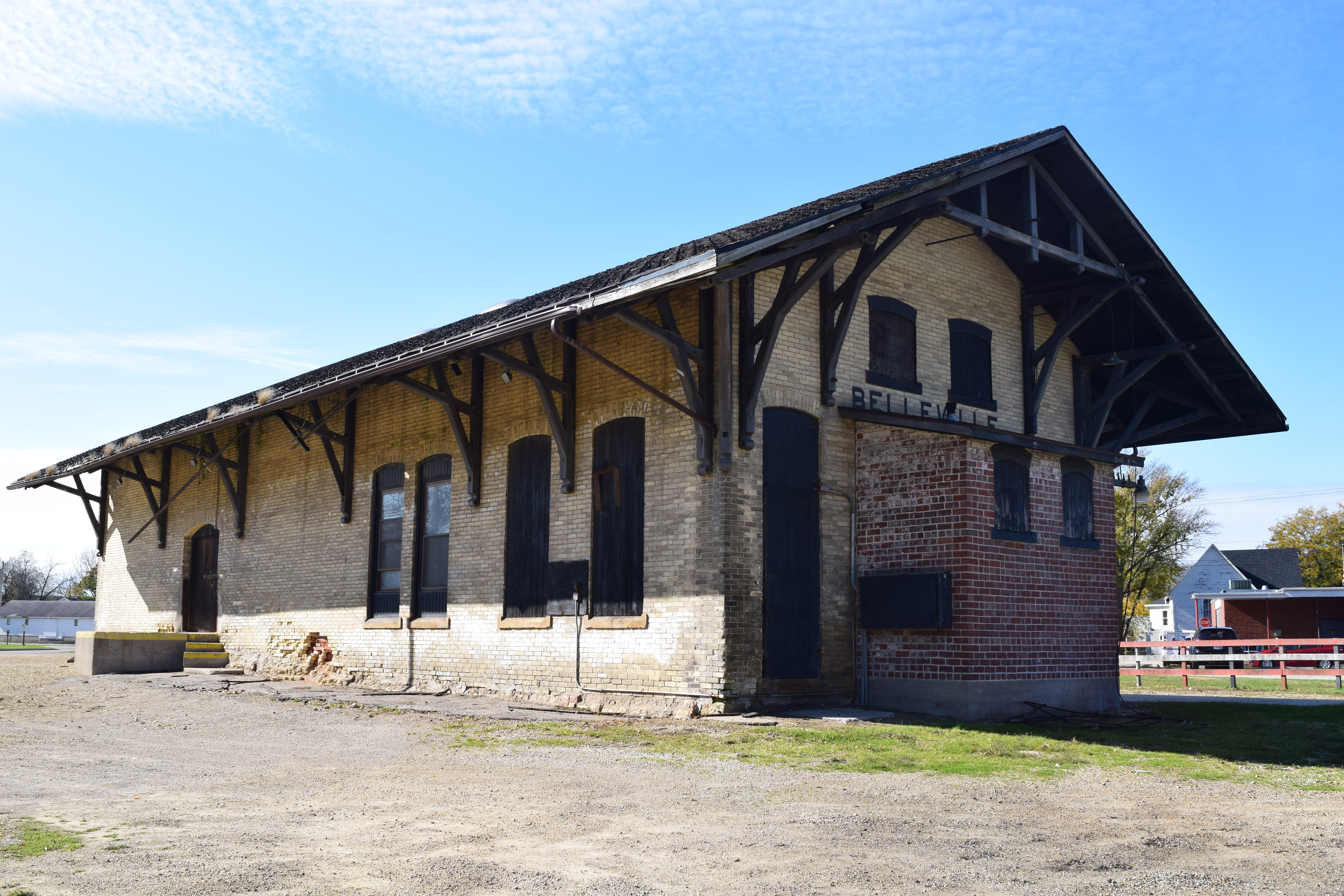
The former Illinois Central station in Belleville in 2017.

The trail had long been seen as a draw for tourism and plans had been made to connect not only to other trails but also to state parks and other commercial ventures along the route. The success of the trail has led to historic designations and rebuilding of structures along the line, such as the former station in Belleville.

== Location ==
- Illinois State line just east of Clarno Rd. in the town of Clarno. 42°30′16″N 89°38′54″W
- Intersection with Southwest Bike Path in Arrowhead Park in Madison. 43°01′33″N 89°27′39″W

== See also ==
- List of hiking trails in Wisconsin
