= Monroe Commercial District =

Historic district in Wisconsin, United States

- U.S. National Register of Historic Places
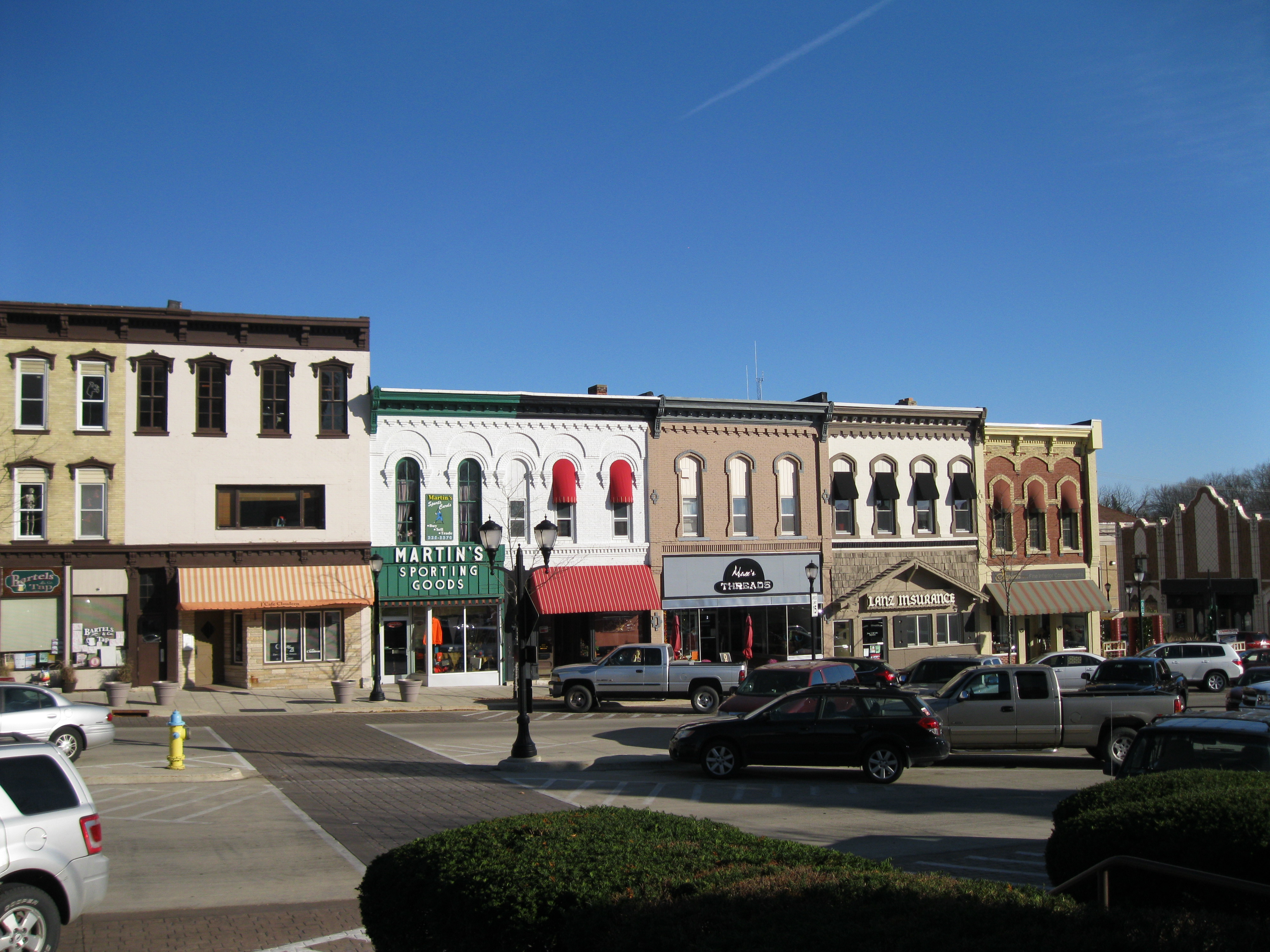

- Location within Wisconsin
- Location: Roughly bounded by 15th and 18th Aves., 9th and 13th Sts., Monroe, Wisconsin
- Coordinates: 42.601111°N 89.64°W
- Area: 31.2 acres (12.6 ha)
- Built: 1850
- Architectural style: Early Commercial
- NRHP reference No.: 82000671
- Added to NRHP: May 6, 1982

The Monroe Commercial District in Monroe, Wisconsin is a 31.2 acres (12.6 ha) historic district which was listed on the National Register of Historic Places in 1982.

The district is roughly bounded by 15th and 18th Aves., 9th and 13th Streets. It included 78 contributing buildings.

It includes the old downtown of Monroe, centered on the courthouse square. Includes the Monroe Planing Mill with its frame part built in the 1840s, the 1861 Romanesque Revival Universalist Church, the 1866 Green County House, the 1870 Italianate Jailhouse Tap, the 1872 Italianate Treat Block, the 1890 Queen Anne-styled Chenoweth Building, the 1904 Neoclassical Ludlow Memorial Library, and the 1931 Art Deco Goetz Theatre.
