= John Luchsinger =

American politician

- Born: June 29, 1839; Canton of Glarus, Switzerland
- Died: April 23, 1922 (aged 82); Monroe, Wisconsin
- Occupations: Jurist, legislator, writer, and pioneer

John Luchsinger (June 29, 1839 – April 23, 1922) was an American jurist, legislator, writer, and pioneer from Wisconsin.

Born in the Canton of Glarus, Switzerland, Luchsinger came to the United States with his family. They lived in Syracuse, New York and Philadelphia, Pennsylvania, before moving to New Glarus, Wisconsin, where they settled on a farm. Luchsinger eventually moved to Monroe, Wisconsin. Luchsinger served four terms in the Wisconsin State Assembly, 1873, 1876–1878, and 1887. He served as mayor of Monroe, Wisconsin from 1894 to 1896 and as county judge for Green County, Wisconsin from 1918 to 1920. He also served on the draft board for Green County during World War I. Luchsinger was also a writer and historian and wrote papers for the Wisconsin Historical Society about the Swiss settling in Wisconsin.
