= John Bolender =

American politician

John Bolender (March 5, 1837 – June 18, 1902) was an American farmer and politician.

Born in Union County, Pennsylvania, Bolender moved with his parents to Illinois in 1840. He then moved to Juda, Wisconsin. In 1861, Bolender moved to Monroe, Wisconsin and was a farmer. Bolender served as town clerk and village treasurer. Bolender served on the Green County Board of Supervisors and was chairman of the county board. In 1882 and 1883, Bolender served in the Wisconsin State Assembly and was a Republican. Bolender died in Monroe, Wisconsin.
