= Janet Jennings =

American nurse and reporter

- Born: 1842; Monroe, Wisconsin
- Died: December 31, 1917 (aged 75)
- Resting place: Greenwood Cemetery
- Other names: "Angel of Seneca"
- Occupations: Reporter, Nurse
- Known for: Nursing in the Spanish American War
- Notable work: Abraham Lincoln, the Greatest American, The Blue and The Gray

Janet Jennings (1842 - December 31, 1917) was an American nurse and reporter, most notable for her work on the Seneca: a ship used to travel back from Cuba during the Spanish–American War. While on the Seneca, Jennings took care of hundreds of wounded and ill patients despite an almost complete lack of medical resources.

== Background and early life ==
Janet Jennings was born in 1842 in Green County, Wisconsin, where she grew up in a family of twelve children. Jennings started her career as a teacher in Monroe, Wisconsin, but she later left for Washington, D.C. to join the American Red Cross and help care for one of her brothers, who was wounded in the war. As a member of the Red Cross, Jennings was an associate of Clara Barton, and aided other wounded soldiers in the American Civil War. Jennings stayed in Washington D.C. after the end of the Civil War to work as a reporter at the United States Department of the Treasury, later reporting for various newspapers.

== Nursing in the Spanish American War ==
After the outbreak of the Spanish–American War, Jennings searched for ways she could support the war effort as a nurse. She left for Cuba as part of the Red Cross in June 1898. After fighting in Santiago, the medical ship Relief was supposed to leave to bring wounded to the U.S., but with more fighting expected, the ship was told to stay in Santiago. Instead of the Relief with its updated and adequate medical supplies, the Seneca was chosen to transport the injured troops back to the United States. On July 13, Jennings volunteered to help on the Seneca and tend to the wounded as they were brought back to the U.S. The ship was over capacity with injured soldiers, understaffed with doctors and nurses, and without adequate medical equipment. Due to the lack of doctors and nurses on board, Jennings worked around the clock in an attempt to help as many patients as possible. After six nights at sea, the ship finally made port near New York City. Forty of the soldiers on the ship wrote her a letter, thanking her for the heroism she showed in the dire situation. Newspapers across the country heralded her as the “Angel of Seneca” for saving numerous lives during her week aboard the Seneca.

== Journalism ==
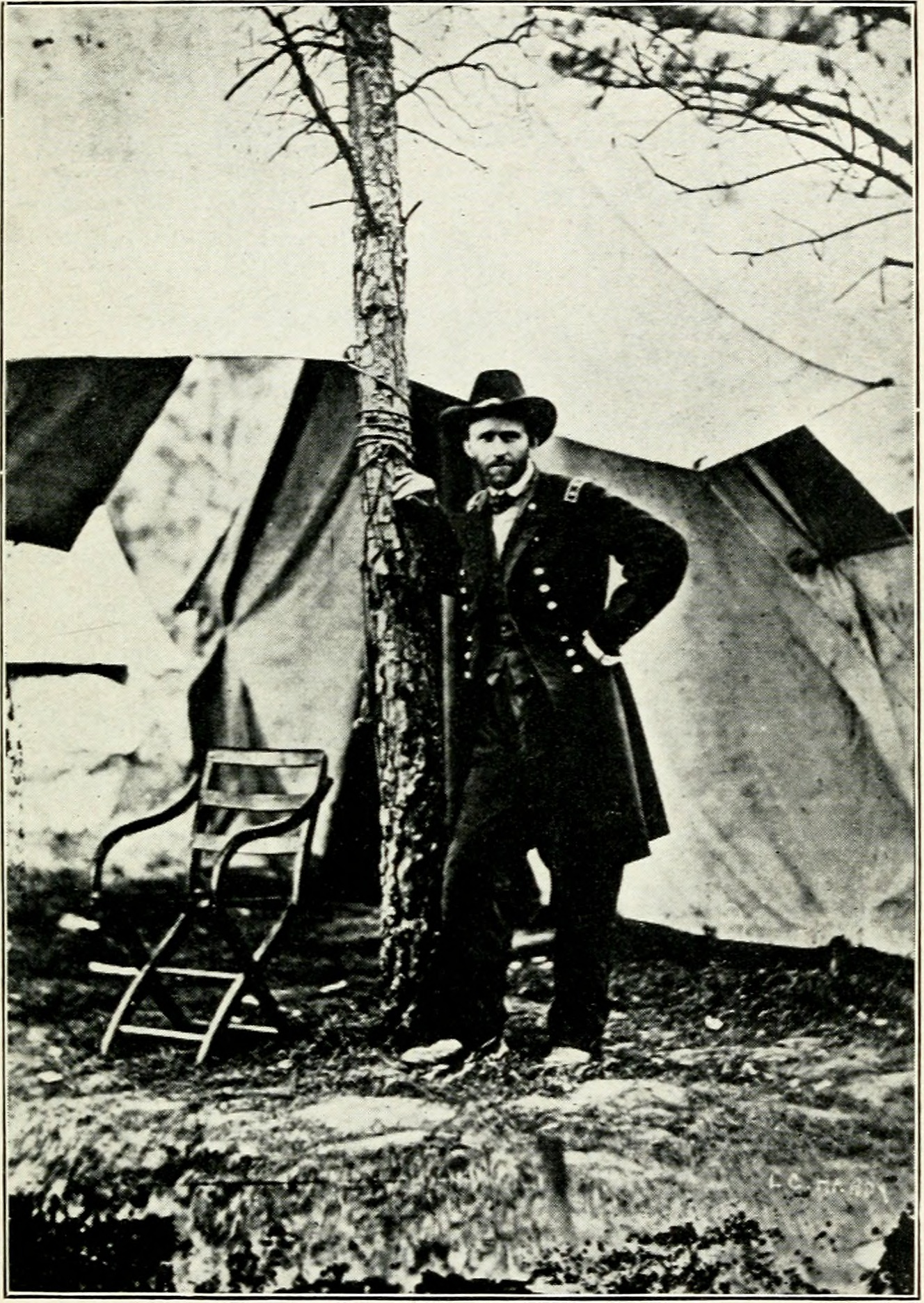
A picture from Abraham Lincoln - the greatest American (1909)

After leaving the Treasury Department, Jennings began working as a reporter. Jennings was a journalist for several newspapers including the New-York Tribune, the Independent (New York City), and the Chicago Herald - Tribune. When Jennings volunteered to go with the Red Cross to Cuba, her intention was to travel to Cuba as a reporter for the Red Cross’s work, despite the restrictions on female reporters at the time. After returning from Cuba on the Seneca, Jennings wrote a statement about the injustice of sending wounded soldiers back on ships with insufficient medical and other resources.

In addition to her work writing for newspapers, Jennings wrote two books, Abraham Lincoln, the Greatest American and The Blue and the Gray.

== Death ==
Jennings died in 1917 of a stroke. She is buried in Greenwood Cemetery in Green County, Wisconsin next to her parents and siblings.
