= Chalet of the Golden Fleece =

- U.S. National Register of Historic Places
- Chalet of the Golden Fleece
- Location: 618 2nd St. New Glarus, Wisconsin
- Coordinates: 42.813778°N 89.634876°W
- Built: 1937-1938
- Architect: J. Jacob Rieder
- Architectural style: Vernacular/Swiss chalet
- NRHP reference No.: 15000551
- Added to NRHP: August 24, 2015

The Chalet of the Golden Fleece is located in New Glarus, Wisconsin.

== History ==
The building was constructed for Edwin P. Barlow. Barlow had founded the annual festival commemorating Wilhelm Tell in New Glarus. The building serves as a museum of Swiss culture. It was added to the State and the National Register of Historic Places in 2015.
