= Nathan J. Lindsay =

United States Air Force general

Nathan James Lindsay
- Born: May 24, 1936; Monroe, Wisconsin, U.S.
- Died: May 25, 2015 (aged 79); San Clemente, California, U.S.
- Burial place: Arlington National Cemetery
- Military career
- Allegiance: United States of America
- Branch: United States Air Force
- Service years: 1959-1993
- Rank: Major General
- Awards: Defense Superior Service Medal; Legion of Merit; Meritorious Service Medal; Joint Service Commendation Medal; Air Force Commendation Medal; Master Astronaut Badge; Master Missile Badge

Nathan James Lindsay (May 24, 1936 – May 25, 2015) was a major general in the United States Air Force and an astronaut. He worked on the Titan III and the Air Force Satellite Control Network.

== Early years ==
Lindsay was born in Monroe, Wisconsin, and earned both a bachelor of science degree and a master of science degree in mechanical engineering from the University of Wisconsin–Madison. He then earned a master of science degree in systems management from the University of Southern California.

== Military career ==
While studying at the University of Wisconsin–Madison, Lindsay earned his commission through the Air Force Reserve Officer Training Corps. He joined the Air Force in 1959, and in 1980 he was named director of operations support and interrogations in the Space Systems Division and in 1982 he was named assistant deputy commander for space operations. Lindsay worked on the Titan III and the Air Force Satellite Control Network. In 1987 he became Director of Special Projects in the Office of the Secretary of the Air Force, and was promoted to major general in 1988. Lindsay retired from the Air Force effective January 1, 1993.

Lindsay died on May 25, 2015, one day after his 79th birthday.

== Awards ==
Awards he received include the Defense Superior Service Medal, the Legion of Merit with oak leaf cluster, the Meritorious Service Medal with oak leaf cluster, the Joint Service Commendation Medal, the Air Force Commendation Medal with oak leaf cluster, the Master Astronaut Badge, and the Master Missile Badge.
