= Little Sugar River (Wisconsin) =

River in Wisconsin, United States

Coordinates: 42°43′24″N 89°26′39″W

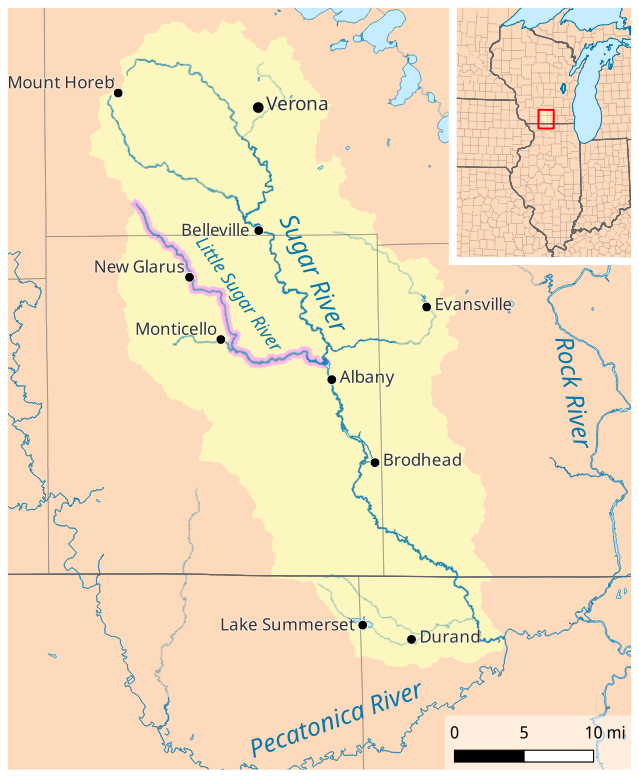
Location of the Little Sugar River in the Sugar River watershed

The Little Sugar River is a 31-mile-long (50 km) tributary of the Sugar River in the U.S. state of Wisconsin.

It rises in Dane County, just north of New Glarus, and flows southeasterly, joining the Sugar River at the mill pond in Albany. The river above New Glarus is considered a class II trout stream by the DNR (1980).

The river widens below New Glarus, and some large wetlands exist bordering it, along the Sugar River State Trail.

== See also ==
- List of Wisconsin rivers
