= Monroe Municipal Airport =

Public airport in Green County, Wisconsin, US

- IATA: none; ICAO: KEFT; FAA LID: EFT

Summary
- Airport type: Public
- Owner: City of Monroe
- Serves: Monroe, Wisconsin
- Opened: November 1963
- Time zone: CST (UTC−06:00)
  - Summer (DST): CDT (UTC−05:00)
- Elevation AMSL: 1,086 ft / 331 m
- Coordinates: 42°36′54″N 089°35′25″W

Map
- Location of airport in Wisconsin EFT (the United States)

Runways
Direction	Length		Surface
Direction	ft	m	Surface
12/30	5,000	1,524	Asphalt
2/20	3,000	914	Asphalt

Statistics
- Aircraft operations (2024): 17,300
- Based aircraft (2024): 41
- Source: Federal Aviation Administration

Monroe Municipal Airport (ICAO: KEFT, FAA LID: EFT) is a city owned public use airport located three nautical miles (6 km) northeast of the central business district of Monroe, a city in Green County, Wisconsin, United States. It is included in the Federal Aviation Administration (FAA) National Plan of Integrated Airport Systems for 2025–2029, in which it is categorized as a regional general aviation facility.

Although many U.S. airports use the same three-letter location identifier for the FAA and IATA, this facility is assigned EFT by the FAA but has no designation from the IATA.

== Facilities and aircraft ==
Monroe Municipal Airport covers an area of 257 acres (104 ha) at an elevation of 1,086 feet (331 m) above mean sea level. It has two runways with asphalt surfaces: the primary runway 12/30 is 5,000 by 75 feet (1,524 x 23 m) and the crosswind runway 2/20 is 3,000 by 75 feet (914 x 23 m).

For the 12-month period ending May 15, 2024, the airport had 17,300 aircraft operations, an average of 47 per day: 95% general aviation, 3% air taxi and 2% military. In July 2024, there were 41 aircraft based at this airport: 40 single-engine and 1 jet.

== See also ==
- List of airports in Wisconsin
