= Cheese Country Trail =

Trail in Wisconsin, United States

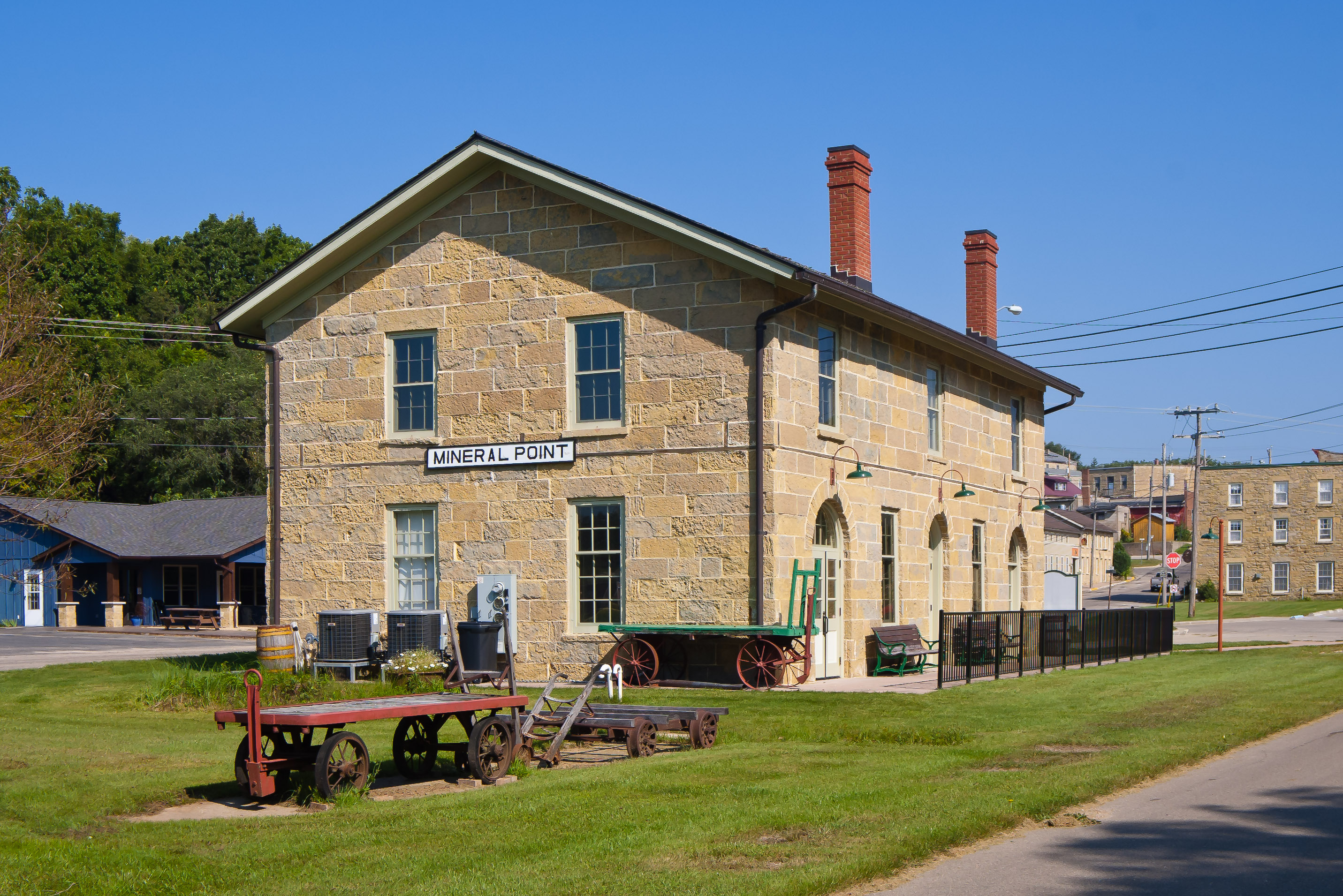
- The Milwaukee Road depot at the Mineral Point trailhead
- Length: 47 mi (76 km)
- Location: Central Wisconsin
- Trailheads: Monroe, Wisconsin; Mineral Point, Wisconsin
- Maintained by: Tri-County ATV Club
- Website: Lafayette County Trails

The Cheese Country Trail is a 47-mile (76 km) multi-use rail trail in south central Wisconsin.

The trail stretches from Monroe to Mineral Point, connecting Browntown, South Wayne, Gratiot, Darlington, and Calamine. The trail is used with ATVs, bicycles, horses, snowmobiles, and hikers.

== Location ==
- Eastern terminus with parking at NW corner of 21st St. and 4th Av. West in Monroe (42°35′32″N 89°39′51″W).
- Northern terminus at Mineral Point Depot on Old Darlington Rd in Mineral Point (42°51′25″N 90°10′36″W).
