= Jane Addams Trail =

The Jane Addams Trail is a 17-mile (27 km) long rail trail in Stephenson County, Illinois.

Jane Addams, the trail's namesake, was born in Stephenson County. The trail's endpoints are Freeport, Illinois and the Illinois-Wisconsin state line, where it becomes the Badger State Trail. The trail passes through Orangeville and is one segment of the 575-mile (925 km) Grand Illinois Trail.
