= New Glarus (town), Wisconsin =

Town in Wisconsin

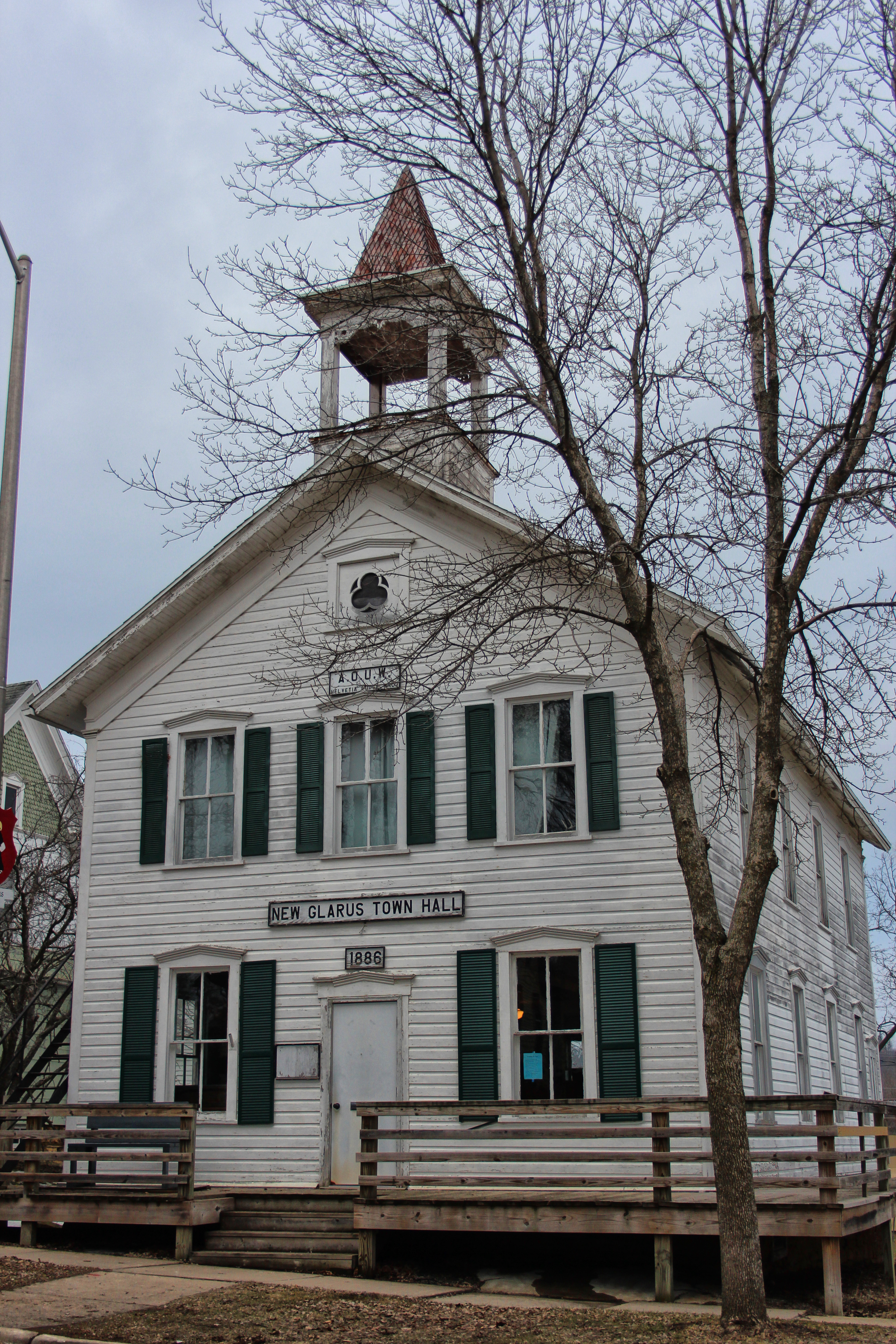
- New Glarus Town Hall

- Location in Green County, Wisconsin
- Coordinates: 42°48′50″N 89°39′47″W
- Country: United States
- State: Wisconsin
- County: Green

Area
  - Total: 34.11 sq mi (88.3 km^{2})
  - Land: 34.11 sq mi (88.3 km^{2})
  - Water: 0 sq mi (0 km^{2})

Population (2020)
  - Total: 1,393
  - Density: 40.84/sq mi (15.77/km^{2})
- Time zone: UTC-6 (Central (CST))
  - Summer (DST): UTC-5 (CDT)
- Area code(s): 608 and 353
- GNIS feature ID: 1583806
- Website: https://townofnewglarus.com/

New Glarus is a town in Green County, Wisconsin, United States. The population was 1,393 at the 2020 census. The village of New Glarus is located within the town.

== Geography ==
According to the United States Census Bureau, the town has a total area of 34.7 square miles (89.9 km^{2}), all land.

== Demographics ==
As of the census of 2000, there were 943 people, 329 households, and 273 families residing in the town. The population density was 27.2 people per square mile (10.5/km^{2}). There were 337 housing units at an average density of 9.7 per square mile (3.7/km^{2}). The racial makeup of the town was 97.77% White, 0.21% Black or African American, 0.11% Native American, 0.32% Asian, 0.42% from other races, and 1.17% from two or more races. 0.74% of the population were Hispanic or Latino of any race.

There were 329 households, out of which 41.9% had children under the age of 18 living with them, 76.3% were married couples living together, 4.0% had a female householder with no husband present, and 17.0% were non-families. 12.5% of all households were made up of individuals, and 3.6% had someone living alone who was 65 years of age or older. The average household size was 2.87 and the average family size was 3.15.

In the town, the population was spread out, with 30.9% under the age of 18, 4.0% from 18 to 24, 30.8% from 25 to 44, 27.3% from 45 to 64, and 7.1% who were 65 years of age or older. The median age was 37 years. For every 100 females, there were 101.9 males. For every 100 females age 18 and over, there were 101.9 males.

The median income for a household in the town was $63,667, and the median income for a family was $66,771. Males had a median income of $37,250 versus $30,833 for females. The per capita income for the town was $23,297. About 2.2% of families and 3.6% of the population were below the poverty line, including 3.2% of those under age 18 and 1.6% of those age 65 or over.
