= Capital City State Trail =

Recreation trail in Wisconsin

- Length: 17 mi (27 km)
- Location: Dane County, Wisconsin
- Trailheads: Cottage Grove Rd, Madison, Wisconsin; Arrowhead Park, Fitchburg, Wisconsin
- Maintained by: Wisconsin Department of Natural Resources
- Website: Capital City State Trail

The Capital City State Trail is a 17-mile (27 km) paved recreation trail in and around Madison, Wisconsin, with connections to the Military Ridge State Trail and the Badger State Trail. A 9-mile (14 km) segment of the trail goes through the Capital Springs State Recreation Area and a state trail pass is required to bicycle, skate or roller-ski this segment. The trail will eventually connect to the Glacial Drumlin State Trail.

The eastern end of the trail is at Cottage Grove Rd in Madison (43°02′32″N 89°21′52″W). The western end is at the Southwest Madison Bike Interchange in Arrowhead Park (43°01′26″N 89°27′40″W).

As of 2023, a bicycle counter located on the trail in downtown Madison records an average of approximately 1,400 users each day.
