= New Glarus Brewing Company =

Brewery in New Glarus, Wisconsin

Coordinates: 42°47′40.19″N 89°37′56.59″W

New Glarus Brewing Co.
- Type: Independent
- Industry: Alcoholic beverage
- Founded: 1993
- Headquarters: New Glarus, Wisconsin, United States
- Area served: Wisconsin
- Products: Beer
- Owner: Dan and Deborah Carey
- Website: newglarusbrewing.com

The New Glarus Brewing Company is an American brewery founded in 1993. Located in New Glarus, Wisconsin, it is an independently owned craft brewery, whose products can only be found in Wisconsin. New Glarus Brewing Company is the 15th largest craft brewer and 25th largest overall brewing company in the United States, by sales volume.

== History ==
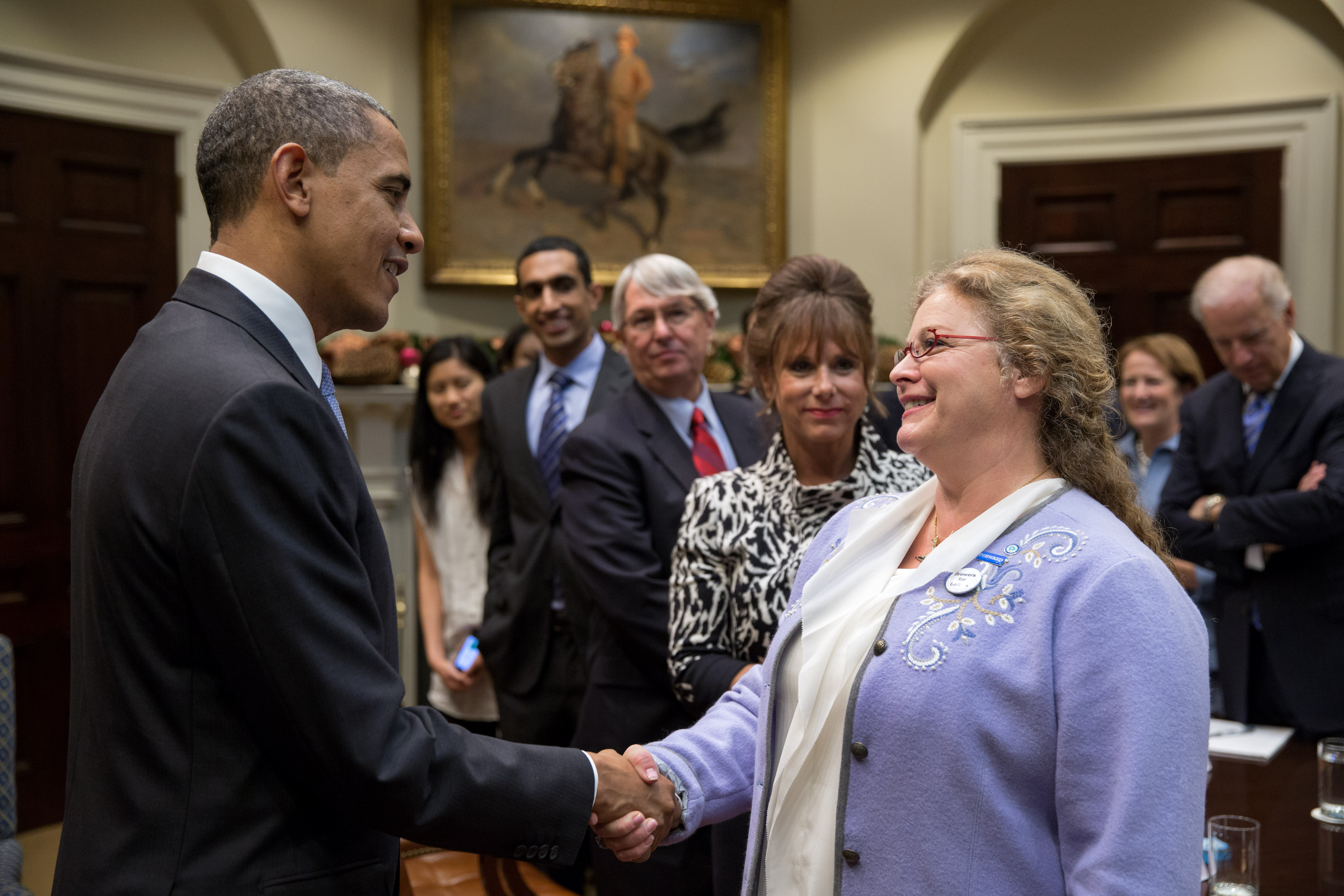
Deborah Carey, co-founder of the brewery, meets President Barack Obama in the White House, November 2012

The New Glarus Brewing Company was founded in 1993 by Deborah Carey as a gift for her husband, Daniel. Before starting the New Glarus Brewing Company, Dan Carey was an experienced diploma master brewer. The brewery began in an abandoned warehouse with used brewpub equipment. In 1997, Dan Carey acquired the copper kettles from a brewery in Germany that was slated to be demolished. When the retiring German brewmaster learned that his kettles could be repurposed, he sold all of his equipment worth an estimated value of $1 million to the Careys for its scrap value of just over $24,000 US. New Glarus Brewing Company brewed its first beer in October of that year and began selling its product in December. Today the company brews a variety of beers, with its Spotted Cow label leading in sales. New Glarus brewing employs about 90 people today.

The brewery made the choice to pull out of Illinois sales effective 2003 leading to the sale of New Glarus beer 'Only In Wisconsin' today. The move was made due to insufficient capacity to fill both Wisconsin and Illinois markets.

In May 2006, New Glarus Brewing Company broke ground on a new $21 million facility on a hilltop on the south edge of the village of New Glarus. The facility was designed to look like a Bavarian village and has become a destination for tourists who visit New Glarus. The original facility drew an estimated 25,000 visitors annually, but the expanded facility likely will draw up to 150,000 people a year. Production at the company's old facility had topped-out at over 65,000 barrels a year. The new 75,000 sq ft (7,000 m^{2}) facility was expected to increase production, and in 2014, New Glarus Brewing was on track to brew 165,000 barrels. A new cellar could give the facility the storage space to brew 300,000 barrels in a year. The expansion will enable the company to increase production of its "Thumbprint", fruit, barrel-aged, and R&D beers. Construction was completed on schedule, and the Hilltop brewery opened in 2008. In 2014, the brewery released its first beers from its wild fruit cave, a specialized addition to its original facility (commonly referred to as the Riverside Brewery) that incorporates wild yeasts and other microorganism used in brewing.

== Spotted Cow ==
The company's best-selling brand is Spotted Cow. First brewed in 1997, Spotted Cow is a cask-conditioned farmhouse ale. New Glarus brews about 45,000 barrels of the beer a year, which accounts for about 40% of all the beer New Glarus makes a year. Spotted Cow has been the best-selling draft beer in the state for a number of years and is considered one of the most well-known beers in Wisconsin. Spotted Cow is one of New Glarus' unfiltered brews, meaning the brewer's yeast is still in it. The brewer's yeast will sometimes settle at the bottom of bottles. Spotted Cow has a 4.8% ABV. New Glarus owners Deborah and Dan Carey said the name Spotted Cow was actually inspired by sheep on a trip to England. The beer reached #1 on the list of the top 100 beers of all time by the Cold Cans podcast.

== Other beers ==
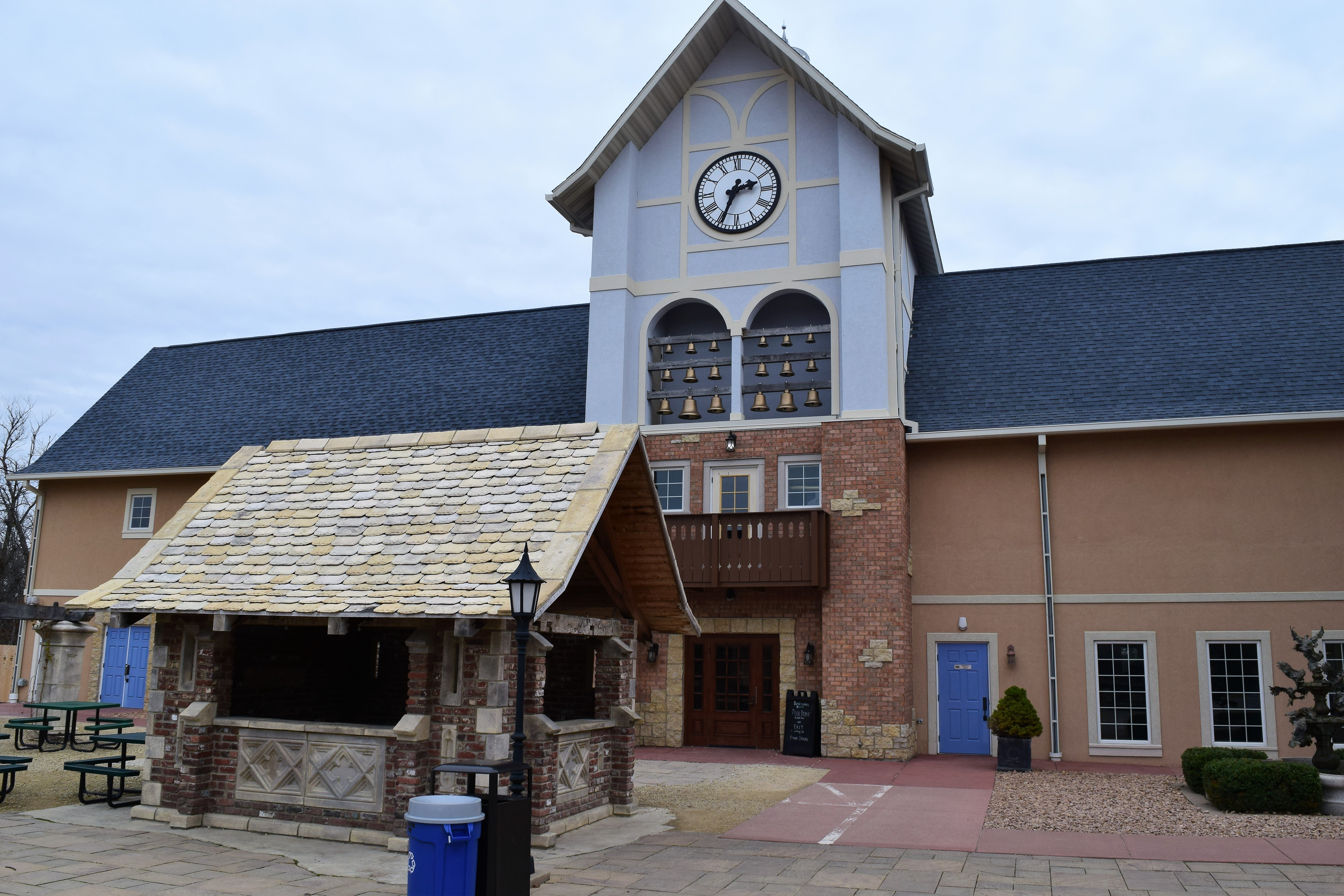
The brewery's tasting room and beer store

The Wisconsin Belgian Red, a fruity Belgian lambic-style ale brewed with Montmorency cherries from Door County, Wisconsin, has won awards in beer competitions around the world, and has ranked in the 100th percentile (highest possible average rating) among the critical beer drinkers at RateBeer.com. The Uff-da Bock, which is a bit stronger than most bocks, is also popular.

New Glarus Brewing Company brews five beers that are available year-round. In addition, the company produces seven seasonal varieties, including a winter Coffee Stout, lighter summer offerings like Dancing Man Wheat, and a fall Staghorn Oktoberfest. "Thumbprint Series" beers are released at the brewers discretion (usually four times per year). These are limited-release brews by owner/brewmaster Dan Carey. There are also limited brewery only releases called the "R&D Series" sold in 500 mL bottles. Some of their beers have rather unusual names, like Stone Soup, and Pumpkin Pie Lust.

== Distribution ==
New Glarus beers are distributed exclusively in Wisconsin by 17 independent wholesalers. Many grocery and convenience stores in Wisconsin carry Spotted Cow and a few other varieties, and many Wisconsin bars have Spotted Cow on tap. Wisconsin Belgian Red and Raspberry Tart are available only in four packs of 12 oz bottles; the remaining brews are sold in standard 12-fl oz (U.S.) bottles, in six- and four-packs or cases, and in quarter- and half-barrels. From 1998 to 2002, the company's brews were also sold in Illinois, with a majority of its sales in the Chicago area. New Glarus actually pulled Spotted Cow from Illinois shelves in 2002 because the company was struggling to meet demand for it in Wisconsin. Deborah Carey also said the often messy "pay to play" approach, sometimes the only route to get a beer on bar/restaurant taps in major U.S. markets, further supported the brewery's limited distribution.

In 2009, a New York City bar was raided and fined for illegally selling Spotted Cow. In 2015, a bar in Maple Grove, Minnesota, also was caught illegally selling Spotted Cow after the establishment's owner allegedly purchased kegs in Wisconsin and took them back to Minnesota for retail sale.

== Awards ==
New Glarus Brewing Company has been one of the most award-winning brewers of its size. It won two bronze medals at the 2009 Great American Beer Festival in Denver. Spotted Cow has won a variety of awards over the years, including Best Drink in Wisconsin in 2009 by Bon Appetit magazine.

== See also ==
- List of breweries in Wisconsin
- Barrel-aged beer
