= Sugar River State Trail =

Wisconsin rail trail

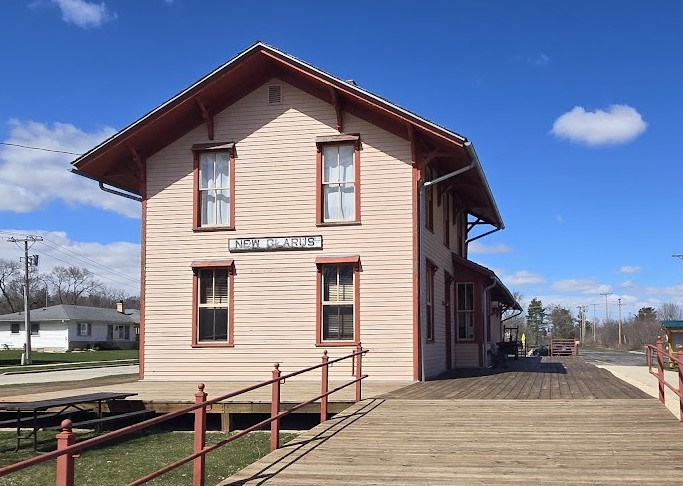
- The trailhead in New Glarus, WI
- Length: 24 mi (39 km)
- Location: Wisconsin, USA
- Designation: multi-use
- Trailheads: New Glarus, Wisconsin and Brodhead, Wisconsin
- Difficulty: easy
- Surface: crushed limestone
- Maintainer: Wisconsin Department of Natural Resources

Trail map
- Interactive map of the Sugar River trail

The Sugar River State Trail is a 24-mile (39 km) long, 265-acre (107 ha), recreation rail trail in Wisconsin.

This trail connects four communities: New Glarus, Monticello, Albany and Brodhead. The limestone-surfaced trail is on an abandoned railroad bed, and is used for bicycling, hiking, and snowmobiling. The trail follows the course of the Little Sugar and Sugar River and includes several trestle bridges.

The Sugar River State Trail is part of the Aldo Leopold Legacy Trail System, linking with the Badger State Trail near Monticello. It also hosts a 9-mile (14 km) portion of the Ice Age Trail.

The north end of the trail is at a parking lot next to the New Glarus Depot on Railroad St. in downtown New Glarus (42°48′57″N 89°37′57″W). The south end of the trail is on Decatur Rd. at the intersection with W. 3rd Av. in Brodhead (42°37′58″N 89°22′46″W).

== See also ==
- List of bike trails in Wisconsin
- List of hiking trails in Wisconsin
- Rail trails
