= New Glarus, Wisconsin =

Village in Green County, Wisconsin, United States

- Village
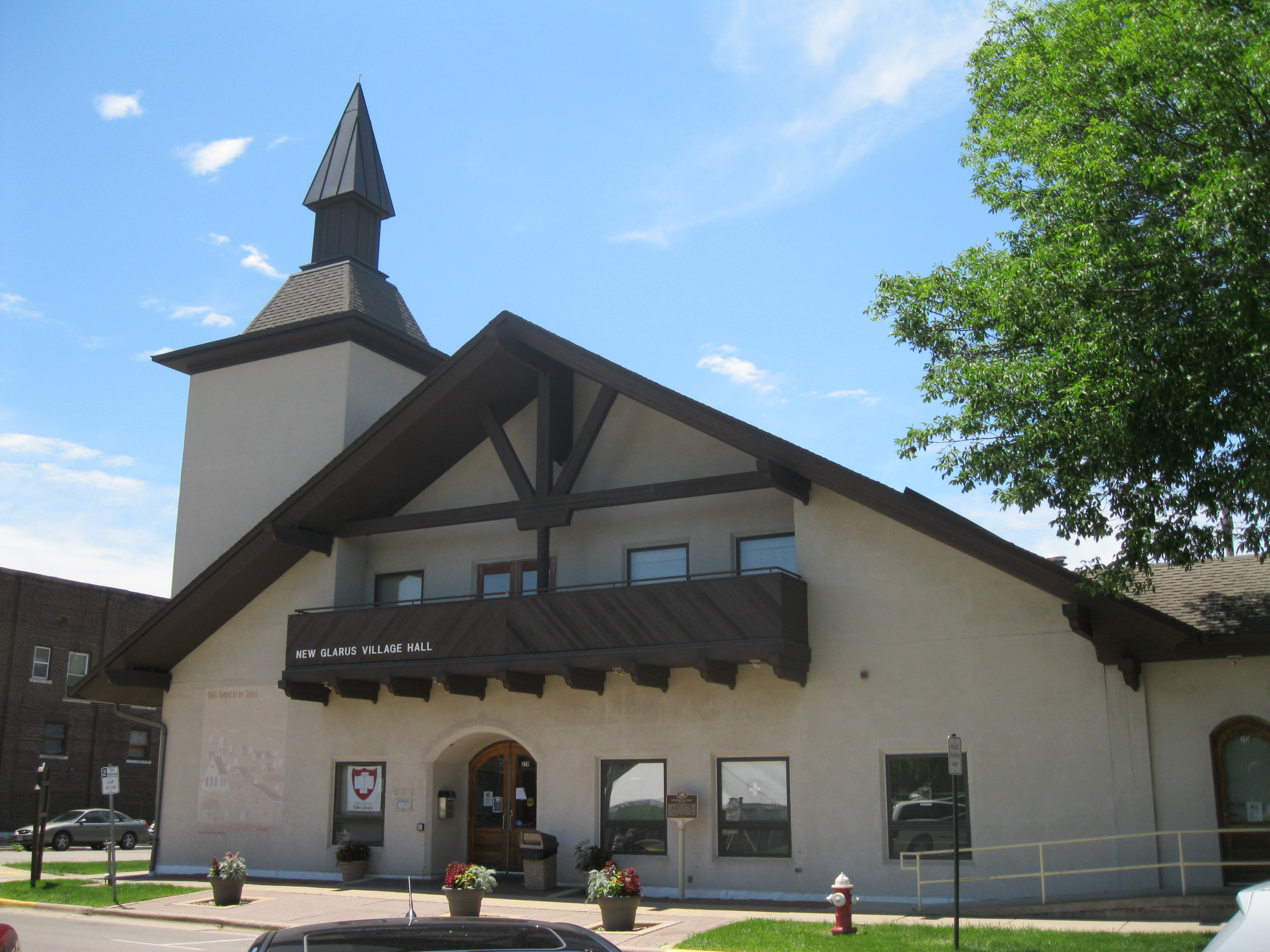
- New Glarus Village Hall

- Location of New Glarus in Green County, Wisconsin

- Location within Wisconsin Location within the United States
- Coordinates: 42.813764°N 89.635365°W
- Country: United States
- State: Wisconsin
- County: Green
- Founded: 1845
- Named for: Canton of Glarus, Switzerland

Government
  - Village Board President: Roger Truttman

Area
  - Total: 1.80 sq mi (4.65 km^{2})
  - Land: 1.80 sq mi (4.65 km^{2})
  - Water: 0 sq mi (0.00 km^{2})
- Elevation: 899 ft (274 m)

Population (2020)
  - Total: 2,266
  - Density: 1,261/sq mi (486.8/km^{2})
- Time zone: UTC-6 (CST)
  - Summer (DST): UTC-5 (CDT)
- Area code: 608
- FIPS code: 55-56700
- GNIS feature ID: 1570216
- Website: www.newglarusvillage.com

New Glarus is a village in Green County, Wisconsin, United States. The population was 2,266 at the 2020 census. It was founded in 1845 by immigrants from the canton of Glarus in eastern Switzerland, from which the village takes its name. It is located at the intersection of Wisconsin Highways 69 and 39 within the Madison metropolitan area.

== History ==
=== Settlement ===
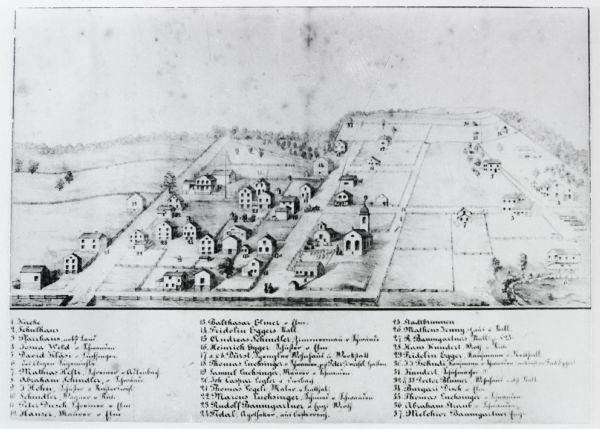
A bird's-eye-view drawing of New Glarus, Wisconsin (1860)

In the early 1840s, after several years of failed crops and as food became scarce, much of the canton of Glarus in Switzerland found itself deep in poverty. With more workers than available jobs, the government of the canton saw emigration to America as a solution. Authorities established the Glarus Emigration Society in 1844, which offered loans to help residents purchase land in the New World. All other expenses associated with the voyage to America were to be paid by the emigrants themselves. Men were offered 20 acres (81,000 m^{2}) free of rent for ten years, after which they could own the land for a mere ten shillings per acre. Given the desperate economic conditions in Switzerland, 193 volunteers decided to leave their homeland to start anew in America.

In 1845, magistrates in Glarus dispatched two men, Nicolas Duerst and Fridolin Streiff, to find a suitable location for a colony in the New World. They were given $2600 and instructions to purchase land, build cabins, and prepare for the settlers to arrive the following spring.

Duerst and Streiff began their search in Ohio, Indiana, and Illinois before reaching St. Louis, Missouri. In the early days of July 1845, they then traveled north to Galena, Illinois, after which they arrived at the land office in Mineral Point, Wisconsin. The men investigated several tracts of farm and timber land in the southern Wisconsin territory before deciding on two square miles along the Little Sugar River. On July 17, 1845, they purchased 1,200 acres (4.9 km^{2}) for $1.25 per acre. It was a fertile basin bounded with hills and a large stand of trees nearby. Some said later it was not the best property available, but the valley and hilltops reminded them of their native Switzerland.

The land that would become the Village of New Glarus was untamed wilderness, which had been inhabited by Native Americans for centuries. An Indian trail passed just south of present-day New Glarus, through what is now New Glarus Woods State Park. That trail later became the main thoroughfare to and from New Glarus. Even as late as 1845 the remnants of an old wigwam were still found near there.

Anxious to begin a fresh life in the New World, families in Switzerland decided to depart much earlier than expected. On April 10, 1845, the group left Glarus on a barge bound for Rotterdam. From there they expected to sail into New York City where friends were scheduled to meet them. Dishonest agents, however, routed them to Baltimore, Maryland, where they first set foot in America after a 49-day voyage. Without any knowledge of the whereabouts of Duerst and Streiff, the former residents of Glarus left Baltimore searching for the two men who arrived before them and the land chosen for their new home.

During their journey across America, the Swiss pioneers heard rumors that Duerst and Streiff had died. Undaunted, the group continued their difficult journey west. When they arrived in St. Louis, it was said that the settlers were covered with mosquito bites and very nearly approaching starvation. From St. Louis they then boarded a steamboat for Galena, Illinois.

Shortly after arriving in Galena, the settlers from Switzerland were excited to learn Duerst and Streiff were alive and had already secured land for their new settlement. Overjoyed, 18 men left that night on foot and walked 62 miles (100 km) to the location of the settlement. Wagons were then dispatched back to Galena for the remainder of the immigrants still there. After a long journey that took four months and five days, 108 settlers arrived at their new home on August 15, 1845. Three members of their party died on the way to southern Wisconsin. The balance found work or friends along the way; many more joined the colony later the following year.

=== Early years ===
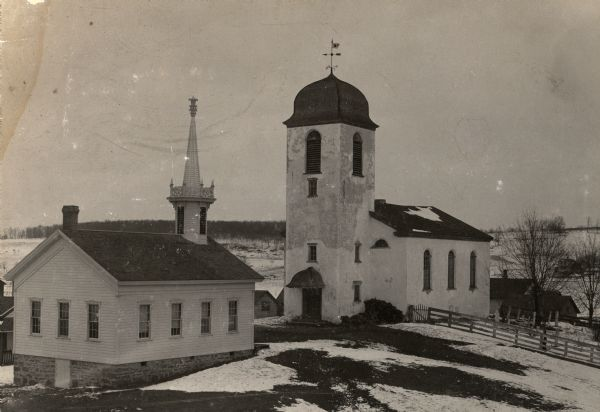
The Swiss Reformed Church in New Glarus, which was destroyed by fire in 1899

In all, the New Glarus settlers purchased 1,200 acres (500 hectares) for their new home. Many of the pioneers were carpenters, mechanics, and farmers; trades that proved useful as the settlers prepared for their first winter in the Wisconsin Territory. A sum of $1,000 was used by the settlers that winter to purchase tools, cattle, seed, and other provisions, all of which had to be repaid with the price of the land within ten years of the formation of the colony. Twelve families stayed in the community's only wooden hut that first winter, which was built on the same property where the Swiss United Church of Christ is presently located. Their diet consisted mainly of potatoes and grated cheese, a dish also known as Röschti. They also ate fish caught from the Little Sugar River. Bread, it was said, was a rarity, and meat even more so. To earn money to survive their first winter, the settlers worked in the nearby lead mines in Exeter and Mineral Point. In 1851 the first store in New Glarus opened, followed in 1853 by the first hotel, and in 1870 by the first cheese factory.

Two years after New Glarus was founded, another group of immigrants arrived from "Old Glarus." Then, one by one, more arrived, and the population of New Glarus was reinforced by new settlers from their motherland. The 1870 census showed 1,247 natives of Switzerland living in Green County, Wisconsin. By 1878 the 22 original 20-acre (8 ha) parcels owned by the first settlers had grown to more than 30,000 acres (12,000 ha) around New Glarus.

Eventually, every Swiss franc loaned to the settlers was returned to their former home in Switzerland with interest. Then in 1861 a terrible fire devastated much of the town of Glarus, the capital of the Swiss canton from which the settlers had originated. The fire destroyed 593 buildings while over 3,000 people lost their roofs and everything they owned. To aid their former countrymen back in their native homeland, the residents of New Glarus collected and dispatched more money than what they received in the form of a loan from Glarus 16 years earlier. In 1881, when much of the town of Elm, also in the canton of Glarus, was buried in the great Rockslide of Elm, which killed 114 people, the residents of New Glarus rushed to help again, this time sending $20,000 back to the old country.

Though they had only been residents in America for a very short time, 98 Glarners fought for the Union during the American Civil War. The residents of tiny New Glarus contributed to other American wars, too. The Swiss Miss Textile Mart and Lace Factory in New Glarus made chevrons and insignia for U.S. military uniforms during World War II. Walter Gabriel Schindler, who was born in New Glarus, fought in that same war and received the Navy Cross and Silver Star. Kevin Patrick Lynch from New Glarus also received the Navy Cross in World War II. In 2001, Henry Janisch, a native of New Glarus, became "one of the first Marine(s) off the first helicopter" in the opening moments of the War in Afghanistan.

=== Agriculture ===
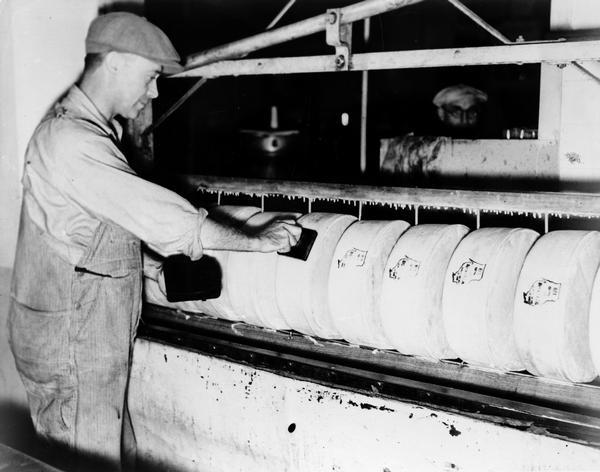
A worker in a New Glarus cheese factory places a Wisconsin stamp on wheels of cheese (1922).

After their first winter in the New World, the residents of New Glarus purchased cattle from Ohio at $12 a head. This stock was the birth of dairy farming and cheese making in New Glarus, a trade many had learned from their fathers and forefathers in Switzerland. Soon the herds of dairy cows in and around New Glarus swelled and dairy products proved lucrative.

Nickolaus Gerber, who moved from New York, started the first cheese factories in New Glarus, beginning with the area's first Limburger cheese factory four miles (6 km) southwest of New Glarus. He later built America's first Swiss cheese (also known as Emmental in Switzerland) factory on the Dietrich Freitag farm outside of New Glarus in Washington township.

Following the end of the Civil War, and with the evolution of the cheese production, the prosperity of New Glarus and neighboring communities grew. At its peak in 1905, New Glarus boasted 22 cheese factories, so many that it was said the crossroads of the town were congested with daily deliveries of milk to the Limburger and Swiss cheese factories. New Glarus quickly became known as the "Cheese Capital of the World." Today only one Limburger cheese factory remains near New Glarus; the last of its kind in all of North America. Despite declining popularity of Limburger cheese, the area around New Glarus still boasts the largest concentration of specialty cheese factories and award-winning cheesemakers anywhere in the United States.

In 1910, Helvetia Milk Condensing Company, of Highland, Illinois, opened a factory in New Glarus to make sweetened condensed milk. It quickly became the village's largest employer. It bought large quantities of milk from farms in the area, and as a result, most of the local cheese factories closed. In 1923, the Helvetia Milk Condensing was renamed the Pet Milk Company. In 1962 Pet Milk Company closed its condensing plant in New Glarus, forever changing the fabric of the small town. Agricultural-based businesses, once integral to the New Glarus economy, disappeared. Cheese factories, farm equipment dealerships, feed mills, hardware stores, and other businesses that profited from local agribusiness were soon gone. However, the plant's closure also spurred the development of tourism as a new source of income for New Glarus, as it promoted the village's ethnic history as a Swiss colony.

=== Development of tourism ===
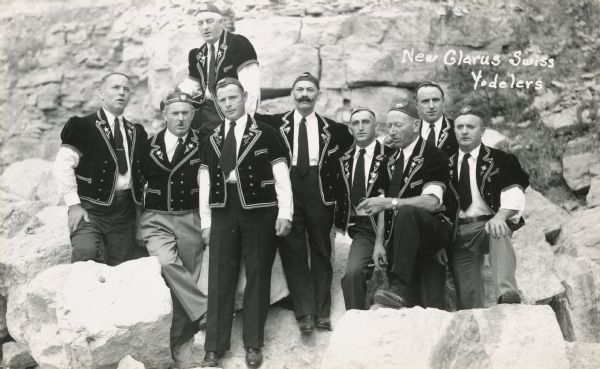
New Glarus yodelers in traditional Swiss garb (1922)

In the years leading up to World War II, an economic crisis affected much of the agriculture and dairy industry in New Glarus. Many residents left the community to look for work elsewhere and leaders became concerned about the future of their small Swiss community. Representatives of the village consulted with the University of Wisconsin–Madison and the Swiss American Historical Society to find a solution. It was decided that tourism could help resurrect the local economy and preserve its identity. Local businesses began changing the way they did business, actively promoting the heritage of New Glarus. Swiss chalet-style architecture began appearing throughout the village and festivals, once intended for local consumption, became frequented by tourists from throughout the upper Midwest. By 1999, the village municipal code was amended to require Swiss architecture in new construction and renovation.

Arnold Wieser, owner of the Swiss Miss Textile Mart and Lace Factory, became a de facto ambassador for New Glarus. As he traveled through the Midwest peddling his embroidery and Swiss lace at festivals and fairs, Wieser actively marketed the community and its Swiss heritage.

Roger Bright, whose polka band played in 33 states, Canada, and Europe, also became an ambassador for New Glarus. Bright's Cleveland-style polka included a Swiss influence and wherever he played he promoted New Glarus. Bright's music was recorded on 35 albums, including hit songs such as "Everywhere You Go" and "Come to the Mountain." When not on the road, the band was a fixture at the New Glarus Hotel on most weekends. In the early 1970s Bright played on The Tonight Show Starring Johnny Carson with the Emmy Award-winning Frankie Yankovic. He also appeared on the Phil Donahue Show and performed with the St. Louis Pops Orchestra.

=== Historical events ===
- In 1887, the Chicago, Milwaukee, St. Paul and Minneapolis Railroad, often referred to as the Milwaukee Road, extended its railroad line to New Glarus, which provided passenger and freight service to the rest of the country. Over time it became one of the railroad’s most profitable lines due to its many milk and cheese shipments. Dubbed the Limburger Express, the line remained open until March 30, 1972, when the Limburger Express made its final run ending 85 years of service to New Glarus. Today 24 miles of the abandoned railroad line from New Glarus to Brodhead, Wisconsin has become the Sugar River State Trail, which is enjoyed by bicycle, snowmobile, and outdoor enthusiasts. And the former railroad depot in New Glarus, the Chicago, Milwaukee and Saint Paul Railroad Depot was restored and added to the National Register of Historic Places in 2000.
- In 1905, a proposal was presented to the people of New Glarus that Limburger cheese be "declared legal tender for the payment of all debts and a medium of exchange throughout the district."
- Joseph W. Weinberg, a physicist who worked for the University of Minnesota and son-in-law of former New Glarus mayor Gilbert P. Hoesly, was accused of passing wartime atomic secrets to Steve Nelson, a Croatian-born American Communist leader. Weinberg, dubbed "Scientist X," was closely shadowed by 10 government counterespionage agents when he and his wife visited New Glarus in 1945 and was later subpoenaed by the U.S. House Un-American Activities Committee in 1948.
- Senator John F. Kennedy campaigned in New Glarus before the Wisconsin Presidential primary election on April 1, 1960.
- In 1968, three Amish farmers—Jonas Yoder, Wallace Miller and Adin Yutzy—refused to enroll their 14 and 15-year-old children at New Glarus High School. They were fined $5 each for violating Wisconsin's compulsory-school-attendance law. It became the basis of Wisconsin v. Yoder, in which the United States Supreme Court in 1972 found that compulsory education past eighth grade did not apply to Amish children, as it violated their fundamental right to freedom of religion.
- Deb Carey, founder and president of New Glarus Brewing Company, was a guest of President Barack Obama in the first lady’s box at his State of the Union address before the United States Congress on February 12, 2013, in Washington, D.C.
- The New Glarus High School boys' basketball team won the Wisconsin Interscholastic Athletic Association (WIAA) Division 4 boys' basketball championship game in Madison, Wisconsin, on March 16, 2019. It was the school's first state championship in any sport and its first visit to the boys' basketball state tournament since 1932.

== Geography ==
According to the United States Census Bureau, the village has a total area of 1.8 square miles (4.66 km^{2}), all land. New Glarus is included in the Madison Metropolitan Statistical Area.

== Demographics ==
Historical population
Census	Pop.	Note	%±
1890	356		—
1910	708		—
1920	981		38.6%
1930	1,010		3.0%
1940	1,068		5.7%
1950	1,224		14.6%
1960	1,468		19.9%
1970	1,454		−1.0%
1980	1,763		21.3%
1990	1,899		7.7%
2000	2,111		11.2%
2010	2,172		2.9%
2020	2,266		4.3%
U.S. Decennial Census

=== 2020 census ===
New Glarus village, Wisconsin – racial composition
Race (NH = Non-Hispanic)	2020	2010	2000	1990	1980
White alone (NH)	92.8% (2,102)	95.7% (2,078)	97.6% (2,061)	99.4% (1,887)	99.9% (1,762)
Black alone (NH)	0.5% (12)	0.6% (14)	0.1% (2)	0.1% (2)	0% (0)
American Indian alone (NH)	0.1% (3)	0% (1)	0.3% (6)	0.1% (1)	0.1% (1)
Asian alone (NH)	0.6% (14)	0.6% (12)	0.4% (8)	0% (0)	
Pacific Islander alone (NH)	0% (0)	0% (0)	0% (0)		
Other race alone (NH)	0.1% (2)	0% (1)	0% (0)	0.2% (3)	
Multiracial (NH)	3% (68)	0.4% (9)	0.3% (7)	—	—
Hispanic/Latino (any race)	2.9% (65)	2.6% (57)	1.3% (27)	0.3% (6)	0% (0)

As of the census of 2020, the population was 2,266. The population density was 1,261.0 inhabitants per square mile (486.9/km^{2}). There were 1,014 housing units at an average density of 564.3 per square mile (217.9/km^{2}). The racial makeup of the village was 94.0% White, 0.6% Asian, 0.6% Black or African American, 0.1% Native American, 0.6% from other races, and 4.1% from two or more races. Ethnically, the population was 2.9% Hispanic or Latino of any race. The most reported ancestries were:

- German (37.3%)
- Swiss (21.1%)
- Irish (18.5%)
- English (17.9%)
- Norwegian (16.8%)
- French (4.7%)
- Italian (3.6%)
- Scottish (3.6%)
- Polish (3.2%)
- Swedish (2.9%)

=== 2010 census ===
As of the census of 2010, there were 2,172 people, 895 households, and 569 families residing in the village. The population density was 1,220.2 inhabitants per square mile (471.1/km^{2}). There were 948 housing units at an average density of 532.6 per square mile (205.6/km^{2}). The racial makeup of the village was 96.9% White, 0.6% African American, 0.6% Asian, 1.2% from other races, and 0.6% from two or more races. Hispanic or Latino people of any race were 2.6% of the population.

There were 895 households, of which 32.3% had children under the age of 18 living with them, 48.4% were married couples living together, 10.8% had a female householder with no husband present, 4.4% had a male householder with no wife present, and 36.4% were non-families. 29.2% of all households were made up of individuals, and 12.3% had someone living alone who was 65 years of age or older. The average household size was 2.34 and the average family size was 2.91.

The median age in the village was 40.5 years. Almost a quarter, or 23.3% of residents were under the age of 18; 5.9% were between the ages of 18 and 24; 26.8% were from 25 to 44; 25.9% were from 45 to 64; and 18.1% were 65 years of age or older. The gender makeup of the village was 48.0% male and 52.0% female.

=== 2000 census ===
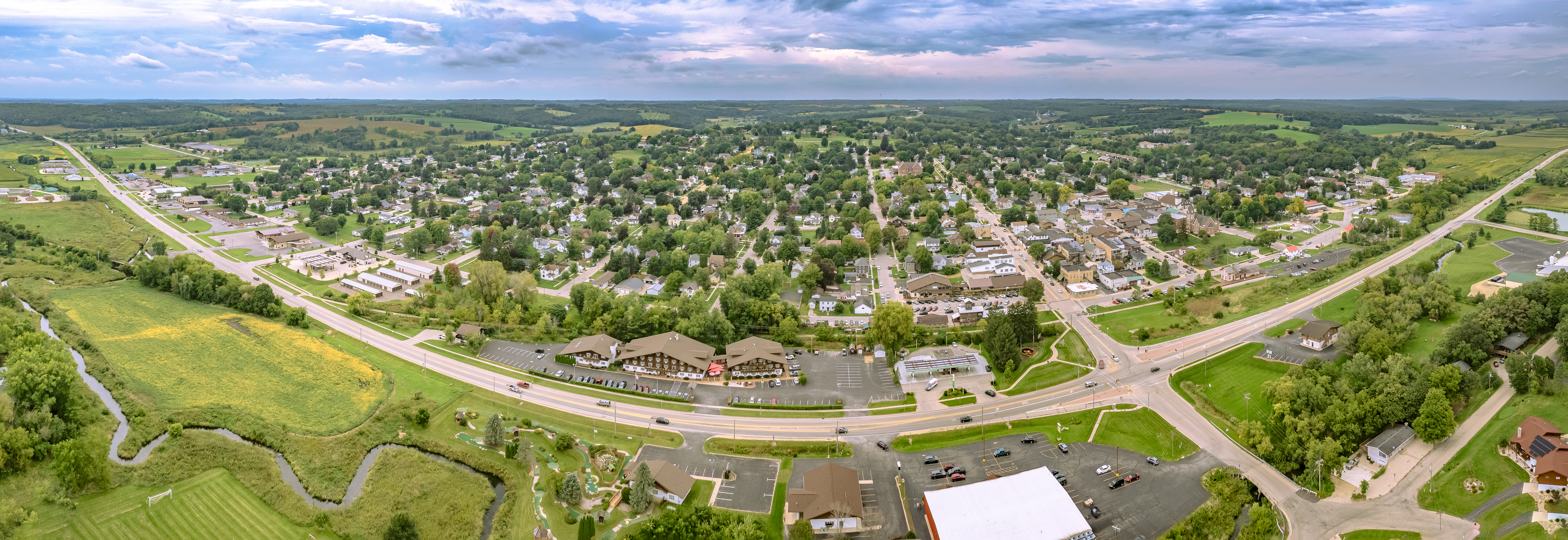

As of the census of 2000, there were 2,111 people, 862 households, and 561 families residing in New Glarus. The population density was 1,469.2 people per square mile (566.0/km^{2}). There were 893 housing units at an average density of 621.5/sq mi (239.4/km^{2}). The racial makeup of the village was 98.44% White, 0.38% Asian, 0.28% Native American, 0.24% from other races, 0.09% Black or African American, and 0.57% from two or more races. 1.28% of the population were Hispanic or Latino.

There were 862 households, out of which 32.4% had children under the age of 18 living with them, 51.6% were married couples living together, 10.8% had a female householder with no husband present, and 34.9% were non-families. 28.9% of all households were made up of individuals, and 16.2% had someone living alone who was 65 years of age or older. The average household size was 2.34 and the average family size was 2.91.

In the village, the population was spread out, with 24.8% under the age of 18, 5.6% from 18 to 24, 29.6% from 25 to 44, 17.9% from 45 to 64, and 22.1% who were 65 years of age or older. The median age was 40 years. For every 100 females, there were 88.7 males. For every 100 females age 18 and over, there were 81.4 males.

=== Language ===
The original dialect of Swiss-German, Glarnerdütsch, was brought from the town and region of Glarus in Switzerland and had been spoken in the New Glarus to a recent point. As of now, the Glarner language of New Glarus contains many older grammatical forms, words, and pronunciations not heard in the original town of Glarus, Switzerland, anymore. It is primarily spoken by older inhabitants of the area and is rarely heard on a daily basis anymore.

A recording to the dialect in archived form is available from the Max-Kade Institute for German-American Studies.

== Economy ==
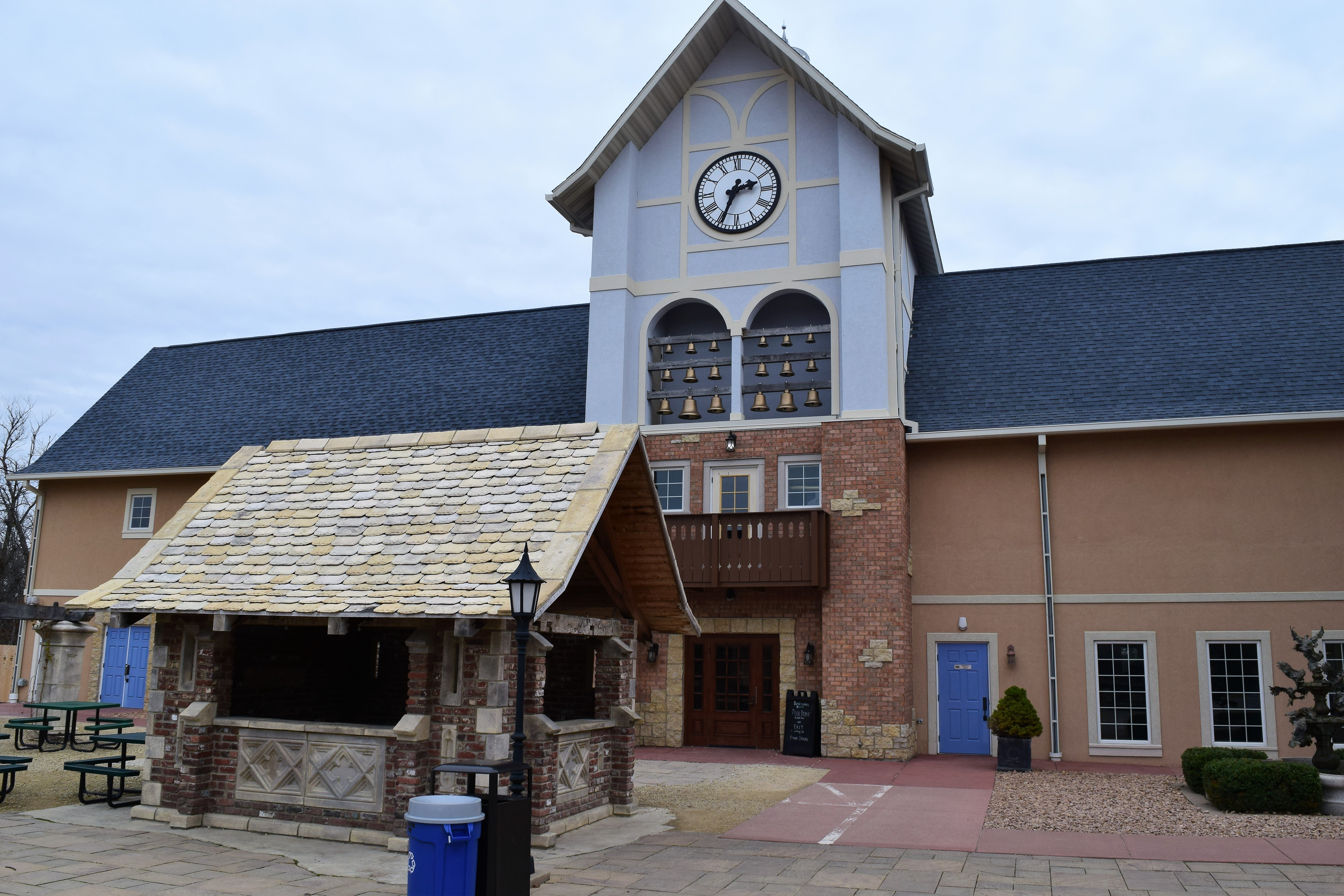
New Glarus Brewing Company tasting room and beer store

Travel and tourism is the largest contributor to the New Glarus economy. The largest employers in New Glarus are Link Snacks, Inc., which makes Jack Link’s Beef Jerky (100–249), the New Glarus School District (100–249), New Glarus Home (100–249), New Glarus Brewing Company (50–99), New Glarus Hotel & Landhaus (50–99), and Bank of New Glarus (50–99).

The median income for a household in the village was $45,000, and the median income for a family was $53,438. Males had a median income of $32,423 versus $28,042 for females. The per capita income for the village was $21,392. About 6.9% of families and 6.6% of the population were below the poverty line, including 8.9% of those under age 18 and 10.0% of those age 65 or over.

=== New Glarus Brewing Company ===
In 1993, Deborah and Dan Carey founded the New Glarus Brewing Company in New Glarus, making Deborah Carey the first woman in the United States to found and operate a brewery. The brewery grew quickly and in 2004 the company broke ground on a new 75,000 sq. ft., $21 million brewery to handle increased demand for its product. The brewery has expanded repeatedly since then and now its facility is over 115,000 sq. ft.; it is expanding again in 2023. Despite selling its beer exclusively in Wisconsin, New Glarus Brewing Company is the 12th largest craft brewer and 22nd largest overall brewing company in the United States.

=== Swiss Center of North America ===
In 1999, New Glarus was chosen as the home of the Swiss Center of North America, a cultural center dedicated to the preservation and celebration of Swiss culture. Chicago, New York, and Toronto were also considered, but New Glarus was ultimately chosen because of its central location and the large concentration of Swiss Americans in the vicinity.

The Swiss Center includes a research library, historical archive, exhibits, conference rooms, and offices. $3 million was pledged, with a majority of the funds coming from the United States Department of Housing and Urban Development, State of Wisconsin, Canton of Glarus, and corporations, including General Casualty Insurance, Nestle USA, Novartis, Phillip Morris Europe, and Victorinox.

== Arts and culture ==
Chalet of the Golden Fleece

The village of New Glarus is a popular tourist destination best known for its Swiss heritage, old world architecture, ethnic dining, small independently owned craft brewery, and outdoor festivals.

More than 160 years after it was founded, New Glarus has maintained much of its Swiss heritage and old world traditions. Swiss-style chalets and flower boxes filled with red geraniums grace the streets of the village and Swiss flags fly next to the American flag at many businesses and homes. Old World meat markets, restaurants, and a Swiss bakery are also found in downtown New Glarus, along with folk art, museums, and Swiss-style shops. Many Swiss customs are still alive in New Glarus, including the card game Jass, yodeling, and flag tossing. Today New Glarus is the best known Swiss settlement in America.

=== Museums ===
- Chalet of the Golden Fleece
- Swiss Village Historical Museum

=== Festivals and events ===
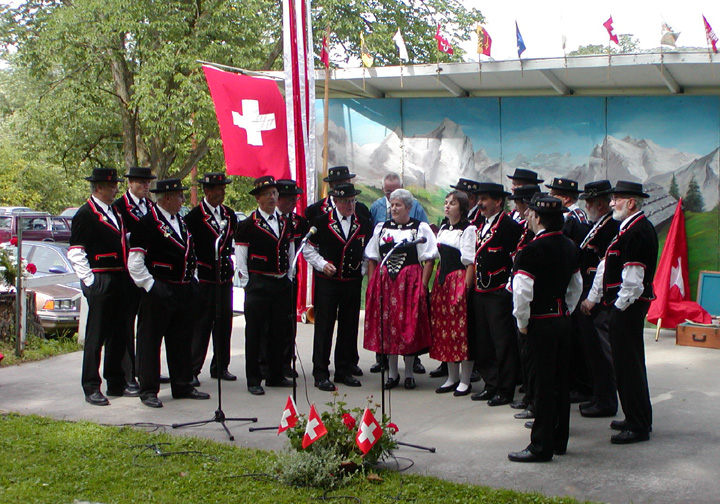
Jodel Choir perform at the New Glarus Swiss Volkfest, a celebration of Switzerland's independence

- Silvesterchlausen
- Winterfest
- World Euchre Championship
- Roger Bright Memorial Polkafest
- New Glarus Beer, Bacon & Cheese Festival
- Heidi Festival
- Volksfest
- Wilhelm Tell Festival
- New Glarus Oktoberfest
- Kilby Supper
- Saint Nicholas Day
- New Glarus Family Fest
- New Glarus Christkindli Market

=== Cuisine ===
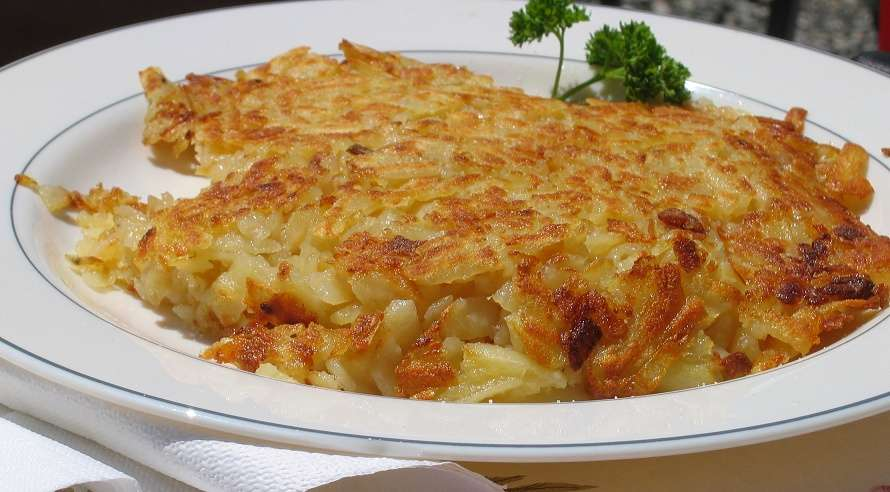
Röschti is a favorite dish in New Glarus.

Despite its small size, New Glarus is known for many traditional Swiss dishes, including specialties rarely seen outside of Switzerland. Foods served in New Glarus include:

- Röschti (or Rösti) – Considered the national dish of Switzerland, it is also a favorite dish in New Glarus. A meal eaten by the early Swiss settlers after first arriving in the New World, Röschti is made with grated potatoes, onions, Swiss cheese, and fresh herbs. Röschti is fried and shaped into rounds or patties. Originally served as a breakfast dish, it is now commonly available as a side dish at most restaurants in New Glarus.
- Kalberwurst – A sausage with a distinctive, creamy flavor that originated in the Canton of Glarus, kalberwurst is made with veal, milk, ground crackers, and mild spices. It has a smooth texture and mild taste, and although most sausages are smoked, kalberwurst is not. It is often cooked with onions and gravy. Many Swiss restaurants in New Glarus serve kalberwurst and it is also a featured dish at the community's annual Kilby Supper.
- Spaetzli (or Spätzle) – Spaetzli are small, boiled and fried dumplings made with eggs, flour, and salt. Roughly translated, spaetzli means "small sparrows," which refers to the dumpling's small shape and size.
- Landjaeger (or Landjäger) – A dried sausage made with beef, pork, lard, sugar, and spices, landjaegers are often eaten as snacks. Pressed into a mold, which gives them a distinctive rectangular shape, landjaegers were sent to soldiers from New Glarus fighting in Europe during World War II because they could be kept without refrigeration. The word Landjaeger means "gamekeeper". The popularity of the sausage has increased over the years and is now sold at most grocery stores, convenience stores, and taverns throughout southern Wisconsin.
- Braetzeli – A wafer-thin cookie with an almond-vanilla taste. Handmade braetzelis are extremely difficult and time-consuming to make. They are cooked on a special Swiss iron, which imprints a decorative pattern on both sides of the cookie.

Other examples of Swiss cuisine commonly available in New Glarus include bratwurst, fondue, Älplermagronen (Alpine macaroni), Zopf, chaeschuechli, schnitzel, chocolates, and Swiss Stollen.

== Transportation ==
Completed in 1887, a railroad to New Glarus was constructed on the Brodhead-New Glarus branch of the Chicago, Milwaukee, St. Paul and Pacific Railroad. The route was nicknamed "The Limburger Special." Service to and from New Glarus ceased in 1972, ten years after the Pet Milk plant in the village closed, which provided most of the freight carried on the rail line. Shortly after the Wisconsin Department of Natural Resources announced the purchase of the 276-acre, 22.78-mile right-of-way for $74,000. It later became the Sugar River State Trail. The New Glarus station is listed on the National Register of Historic Places.

== Notable people ==
- Roger Bright, polka musician
- John Closner, developer, rancher, sheriff and "father" of Hidalgo County, Texas
- Ernst J. Hoesly, legislator and businessman
- Herbert Kubly, author
- Solomon Levitan, treasurer of Wisconsin
- John Luchsinger, legislator, jurist, and writer
- Jody Samson, knifemaker and bladesmith
- S. A. Schindler, politician, businessman, and cashier
- Walter Schindler, U.S. Navy vice admiral and recipient of the Navy Cross, Silver Star and Legion of Merit
- Theodore G. Streissguth, legislator and businessman
- Jefferson F. Wescott, legislator
- Stan Zweifel, American football coach

== See also ==
- New Glarus Town Hall
- Swiss Americans
- William Tell (play)
