= National Register of Historic Places listings in Green County, Wisconsin =

Location of Green County in Wisconsin

This is a list of the National Register of Historic Places listings in Green County, Wisconsin. It is intended to provide a comprehensive listing of entries in the National Register of Historic Places that are located in Green County, Wisconsin. The locations of National Register properties for which the latitude and longitude coordinates are included below may be seen in a map.

There are 31 properties and districts listed on the National Register in the county.

This National Park Service list is complete through NPS recent listings posted May 9, 2025.

== Current listings ==
	Name on the Register	Image	Date listed	Location	City or town	Description
1	1st and 2nd Street Historic District	1st and 2nd Street Historic District	May 10, 2021 (#100006495)	Generally bounded by 1st and 2nd Sts. between 6th and 12th Aves. 42°48′42″N 89°38′05″W	New Glarus	Best-preserved historic neighborhood in New Glarus, including the 1890 Gabled ell-style Luchsinger house, the 1909 Queen Anne-style Henry Duerst house, the 1913 Colonial Revival Hoesly house, the 1925 American Foursquare Arn house, the 1919 Craftsman Marty house, the 1927 John Duerst bungalow, and the 1938 Swiss chalet-style Chalet of the Golden Fleece. Several of these were designed by local builder Oswald Altman.
2	2nd Street Commercial Historic District	2nd Street Commercial Historic District	May 10, 2021 (#100006496)	2nd St. between 4th and 5th Aves., 130 and 200 5th Ave. 42°48′57″N 89°38′06″W	New Glarus	Historic remnants of New Glarus's old downtown, including the 1867 Boomtown-style Little Villager, the 1880 Italianate-style Schindler Block, the bartizaned 1910 Citizen's Bank, the 1929 Stuessy building, and the 1934 Bigler's Swiss Tavern (pictured).
3	Judge John A. Bingham House	Judge John A. Bingham House	January 2, 1976 (#76000063)	621 14th Ave. 42°36′21″N 89°38′31″W	Monroe	Formal Greek Revival house built in 1850 and expanded in 1877. Vermont-native Bingham came to Monroe in 1842 as a lawyer, became DA and judge, started banks, helped bring the railroad to Monroe, served on the school board, and was active in the Republican Party.
4	Gen. James Bintliff House	Gen. James Bintliff House	May 14, 1979 (#79000080)	723 18th Ave. 42°36′17″N 89°38′15″W	Monroe	Gothic Revival cottage built in 1858 by English immigrant Bintliff, who distinguished himself in the Third Battle of Petersburg.
5	Dr. Samuel Blumer House	Dr. Samuel Blumer House	November 5, 1992 (#92001556)	112 Sixth Ave. 42°48′53″N 89°38′05″W	New Glarus	1858 home in Greek Revival style. The walls are rubble limestone covered with a smooth plaster finish, a technique that New Glarus' settlers brought from Canton Glarus in Switzerland. Blumer was the village's first physician.
6	Cadiz Township Joint District No. 2 School	Cadiz Township Joint District No. 2 School	April 12, 1996 (#96000419)	214 School St. 42°34′34″N 89°47′24″W	Browntown	2-room State Graded school built in 1921, in Craftsman style with brick walls and a hip roof. Served the community until 1983 - then converted to a home.
7	Caradine Building	Caradine Building	May 8, 1979 (#79000081)	1007 16th Ave. 42°36′07″N 89°38′24″W	Monroe	2-story store built in 1869 for Elisha Mosher's commission and auction business. Still has original cast iron columns at street level and elaborate brickwork above. Caradines bought it in 1907 to house their dental clinic. Now a museum.
8	Chalet of the Golden Fleece	Chalet of the Golden Fleece	August 24, 2015 (#15000551)	618 2nd St. 42°48′50″N 89°38′06″W	New Glarus	House in the style of a mountain chalet from the Bernese Alps of Switzerland, designed by J. Jacob Rieder and built in 1937-38 for Edwin P. Barlow, founder of New Glarus's Wilhelm Tell Festival.
9	Frank L. Chenoweth House	Frank L. Chenoweth House	October 8, 1976 (#76000064)	2004 10th St. 42°36′07″N 89°38′05″W	Monroe	2.5 story elaborate Queen Anne-styled house with 3-story octagonal tower and matching coach house, built 1888-89. Frank was a merchant in Monroe.
10	Chicago, Milwaukee and Saint Paul Railroad Depot	Chicago, Milwaukee and Saint Paul Railroad Depot	April 6, 2000 (#00000359)	418 Railroad St. 42°49′00″N 89°37′57″W	New Glarus	Small-town wooden depot with Victorian trim, built by the Chicago, Milwaukee and St. Paul Railroad in 1887, and operated until 1972.
11	Cleveland's Hall and Blacksmith Shop	Cleveland's Hall and Blacksmith Shop	January 7, 2010 (#09001220)	N7302 County Trunk Highway X 42°46′12″N 89°28′50″W	Brooklyn	Blacksmith shop at a rural crossroad, built around 1873. Ten years later, Cleveland converted the second story to a dance hall and meeting room, while the first floor remained the smithy.
12	Exchange Square Historic District	Exchange Square Historic District	November 15, 1984 (#84000724)	Roughly bounded by 10th, RR tracks, E. 2nd and W. 3rd Aves. 42°37′11″N 89°22′37″W	Brodhead	The old downtown of Brodhead around Exchange Square, including the 1856 Farmer's Hotel, the 1868 Italianate Gombar-Laube Hall, the 1869 High Victorian Gothic Pfisterer building, the 1881 Bartlett Wagon and Carriage Factory, the 1885 (or 1882?) Chicago, Milwaukee and St. Paul Depot, and the 1895 Queen Anne Laube Building (pictured).
13	First Methodist Church	First Methodist Church	February 25, 1975 (#75000065)	11th St. and 14th Ave. 42°36′06″N 89°38′34″W	Monroe	Gothic revival design by E. Townsend Mix, with a turned corner tower and unusual teardrop windows, built 1869-1887.
14	Freitag Homestead	Freitag Homestead	November 15, 2005 (#05001302)	N7053 WI 69/39; 42°45′35″N 89°36′58″W	Washington	Historic farm begun in 1848 by a founder of New Glarus. Also the site of the first Swiss cheese factory in Wisconsin.
15	Freitag's Pure Oil Service Station	Freitag's Pure Oil Service Station	January 15, 1980 (#80000139)	1323 9th St. 42°36′11″N 89°38′28″W	Monroe	1929 gas station styled like an English cottage, with service bay. Pure Oil built hundreds of similar stations across the country, branding with architecture.
16	Green County Courthouse	Green County Courthouse	March 21, 1978 (#78000097)	Courthouse Sq. 42°36′06″N 89°38′21″W	Monroe	Richardsonian Romanesque courthouse designed by G. Stanley Mansfield and built in 1891.
17	Hefty-Blum Farmstead	Hefty-Blum Farmstead	June 2, 2000 (#00000601)	W6303 Hefty Rd. 42°45′49″N 89°40′20″W	Washington	Historic farm started in 1848 by Swiss immigrant Fridolin Hefty and run by generations of the family. Includes 1859 granary, 1861 stone barn, 1880 house, 1881 cheese factory, 1882 frame dairy barn, and 1882 buggy shed.
18	C. D. Hulburt House	C. D. Hulburt House	May 8, 1979 (#79000082)	1205 13th Ave. 42°36′00″N 89°38′37″W	Monroe	Smallish Second Empire-styled house built in 1878, brick-walled with bell-curved mansard roof. Chauncey Hulburt came west from New York in the 1840s and became a lumberman in Monroe, finishing the inside of this house with elegant woodwork.
19	Janet Jennings House	Janet Jennings House	January 2, 1976 (#76000065)	612 22nd Ave. 42°36′21″N 89°37′56″W	Monroe	Italianate-styled Foursquare house built in the early 1870s. Jennings went to Washington in 1863 to care for her brother who was wounded at Chancellorsville. There she worked with Clara Barton, and ended up managing a unit of hospital tents. She later wrote for major newspapers and organized another hospital at Santiago during the Spanish–American War.
20	Monroe Commercial District	Monroe Commercial District	May 6, 1982 (#82000671)	Roughly bounded by 15th and 18th Aves., 9th and 13th Sts. 42°36′04″N 89°38′24″W	Monroe	The old downtown of Monroe, centered on the courthouse square. Includes the Monroe Planing Mill with its frame part built in the 1840s, the 1861 Romanesque Revival Universalist Church, the 1866 Green County House, the 1870 Italianate Jailhouse Tap, the 1872 Italianate Treat Block, the 1890 Queen Anne-styled Chenoweth Building, the 1904 Neoclassical Ludlow Memorial Library, and the 1931 Art Deco Goetz Theatre.
21	Monroe Water Tower	Monroe Water Tower	November 15, 2005 (#05001290)	16th Ave. and 20th St. 42°35′43″N 89°38′23″W	Monroe	80-foot brick water tower built in 1889, originally with a 100,000 gallon wooden tank on top - now steel. The tower's water system was one of the first major public services provided by the city of Monroe.
22	New Glarus Hotel		May 5, 2025 (#100011829)	100 6th Avenue; 42°48′53″N 89°38′03″W	New Glarus	First part was built in 1853, with additions in 1880 and 1915. In the 1960s and 70s, owner Robbie Schneider added Swiss stylings to the building, making it a center of the effort to make New Glarus a Swiss cultural tourism destination.
23	New Glarus Public School and High School	New Glarus Public School and High School	March 26, 1998 (#98000284)	413 Sixth Ave. 42°48′51″N 89°38′17″W	New Glarus	Richardsonian Romanesque-styled school built in 1896, designed by Conover & Porter of Madison. Expanded in 1914, 1915 and 1933, with an Art Deco-styled gym added in 1939.
24	New Glarus Town Hall	New Glarus Town Hall	April 11, 2008 (#08000286)	206 2nd St. 42°49′05″N 89°38′06″W	New Glarus	Greek Revival-styled building built jointly in 1886 by the town and the Ancient Order of United Workmen. Town functions were on the first floor and basement, and the AOUW met upstairs.
25	Jacob Regez, Sr. House	Jacob Regez, Sr. House	January 17, 1980 (#80000140)	2121 7th St. 42°36′19″N 89°37′56″W	Monroe	2.5-story Queen Anne-styled home with a large, round veranda. Regez was a Swiss immigrant who played an important role in developing Monroe's Swiss cheese industry.
26	Francis West Smith House	Francis West Smith House	April 17, 1979 (#79000083)	1002 W. 2nd Ave. 42°37′14″N 89°22′40″W	Brodhead	2-story cream brick Italianate-styled house with delicate scroll-sawn brackets built in 1877, with a 2-story brick carriage house. Francis was a New Yorker who arrived in Brodhead in 1865 and operated a grocery store near the house.
27	John C. and Barbara Steinman House	John C. and Barbara Steinman House	November 26, 2003 (#03001215)	330 S. Monroe St. 42°44′34″N 89°35′42″W	Monticello	Fine, intact 2-story Queen Anne-style home built in 1903-1904, with wood floors and original grills inside, and with a carriage barn. John was a partner in a general merchandise business, and involved in real estate, insurance, lumber and feed.
28	Wilhelm Tell Schuetzen Haus and Park	Wilhelm Tell Schuetzen Haus and Park	August 12, 2022 (#100007989)	N8745 Cty. Rd. O 42°49′23″N 89°38′19″W	New Glarus	Sharpshooting clubs were a Swiss tradition, and a local club formed here in 1870, buying the grounds in 1879. In 1907 they built the shooting house, which hosted practices, shooting competitions, and social events.
29	Albert and Minna Ten Eyck Round Barn	Albert and Minna Ten Eyck Round Barn	November 29, 2016 (#16000813)	W968 WI 11; 42°35′19″N 89°24′37″W	Spring Grove	A true round barn, built in 1922 with tile walls at ground level, wood walls above, and a silo in the middle. Albert was a professor of agriculture, as well as a farmer.
30	Gen. Francis H. West House	Gen. Francis H. West House	January 1, 1975 (#75000066)	1410 17th Ave. 42°35′53″N 89°38′15″W	Monroe	2-story brick house of joined polygons with an octagonal cupola, built in 1860, before West led a regiment in the Civil War.
31	F. F. White Block	F. F. White Block	January 31, 1979 (#79000084)	1514-1524 11th St. 42°36′03″N 89°38′23″W	Monroe	Monumental 3.5-story business block on courthouse square, designed by Allan Darst Conover in Tudor Revival style and built in 1900.

== See also ==
- List of National Historic Landmarks in Wisconsin
- National Register of Historic Places listings in Wisconsin
- Listings in neighboring counties: Dane, Iowa, Lafayette, Rock, Stephenson (IL), Winnebago (IL)
