= Jennings House =

Jennings House may refer to:

- Green-Jennings House, Cullman, Alabama, listed on the Alabama Register of Landmarks and Heritage
- Kahn-Jennings House, Little Rock, Arkansas
- Jennings House, San Diego, California, a San Diego Historic Landmark
- William Sherman Jennings House, Brooksville, Florida
- Gabriel Jennings House, Dawson Springs, Kentucky, listed on the National Register of Historic Places (NRHP)
- Jennings-Salter House, Lancaster, Kentucky
- Dr. William Jennings House, Pinckard, Kentucky, listed on the NRHP
- Jennings House (Annapolis, Maryland)
- Stephen Jennings House, Farmington Hills, Michigan, a Michigan State Historic Site
- H. N. Jennings House, Fenton, Michigan, listed on the NRHP
- Murphey-Jennings House, Sumner, Mississippi, listed on the NRHP
- Jennings-Marvin House, Dryden, New York
- Oliver Gould Jennings House, Manhattan, New York
- Jennings-Baker House, Reidsville, North Carolina
- Jennings–Gallagher House, California, Pennsylvania
- Jennings-Brown House, Bennettsville, South Carolina
- Janet Jennings House, Monroe, Wisconsin, listed on the NRHP
- Ellis Jennings House, Neenah, Wisconsin, listed on the NRHP
