= White Building =

The White Building or White Block may refer to:

== Cambodia ==
- White Building (Phnom Penh), a major work of New Khmer Architecture
- White Building (film), 2021

== Poland ==
- White Building (Warsaw), a historic building

== United Kingdom ==
- White Building, London, England, an arts centre

== United States ==
- White Building (Bloomington, Illinois), listed on the National Register of Historic Places (NRHP)
- W.E. White Building, Stockton, Illinois, NRHP-listed
- Josephine White Block, Providence, Rhode Island, NRHP-listed
- F. F. White Block, Monroe, Wisconsin, NRHP-listed in Green County

== See also ==
- White House (disambiguation), which includes a number of buildings named "White House"
