= Noah Phelps (Wisconsin politician) =

American politician

Noah Phelps (May 21, 1808 – July 29, 1896) was an American surveyor and politician.

Born in Turin, New York, Phelps was a surveyor. In 1833, he became an assistant surveyor in Michigan Territory. In 1838, he moved to a farm in the town of Washington in Green County, Wisconsin. He served as county surveyor and county tax collector. He served in the Wisconsin Territorial Legislature in 1845 and 1846. He also served in the first Wisconsin Constitutional Convention of 1846 as a Democrat. Then he served as Green County clerk of circuit court and justice of the peace. He died at his farm after falling off of his porch.
