= Hefty–Blum Farmstead =

- U.S. National Register of Historic Places
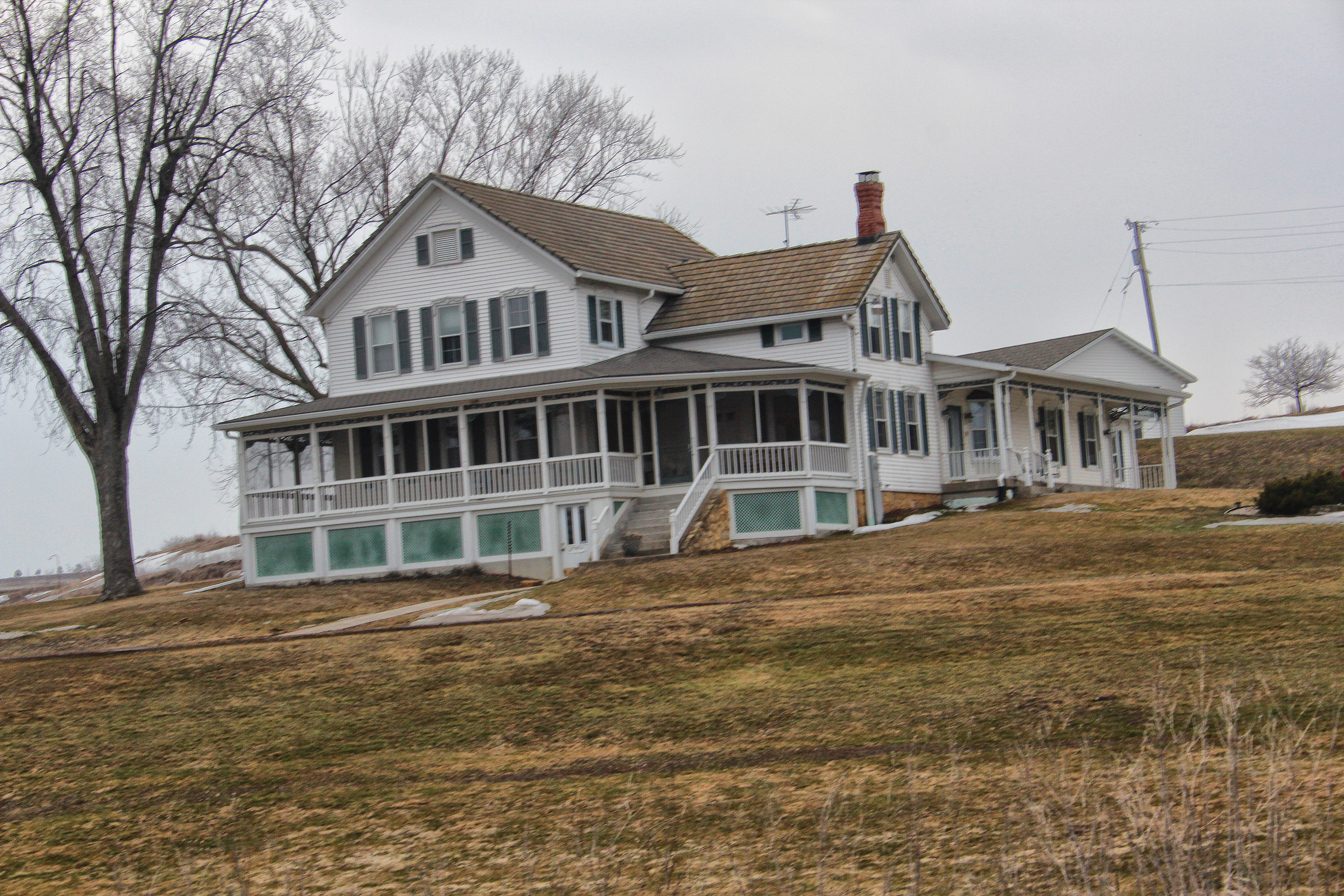
- A portion of the farmstead.
- Location: W6303 Hefty Rd., Washington, Green County, Wisconsin
- Coordinates: 42°45′49″N 89°40′20″W
- Area: 7 acres (2.8 ha)
- Architectural style: Victorian
- NRHP reference No.: 00000601
- Added to NRHP: June 2, 2000

The Hefty–Blum Farmstead is located in Washington, Green County, Wisconsin.

== History ==
Fridolin Hefty was an immigrant from Switzerland. He first began operating his farm in 1848. Over the course of decades, several buildings were constructed on the site. It was added to the State and the National Register of Historic Places in 2000. The farmstead is also known as Meadowbrook Dairy Farm.

Hefty's grandson, Fred K. Hefty, was a member of the Wisconsin State Assembly.
