= Monroe Water Tower =

- U.S. National Register of Historic Places
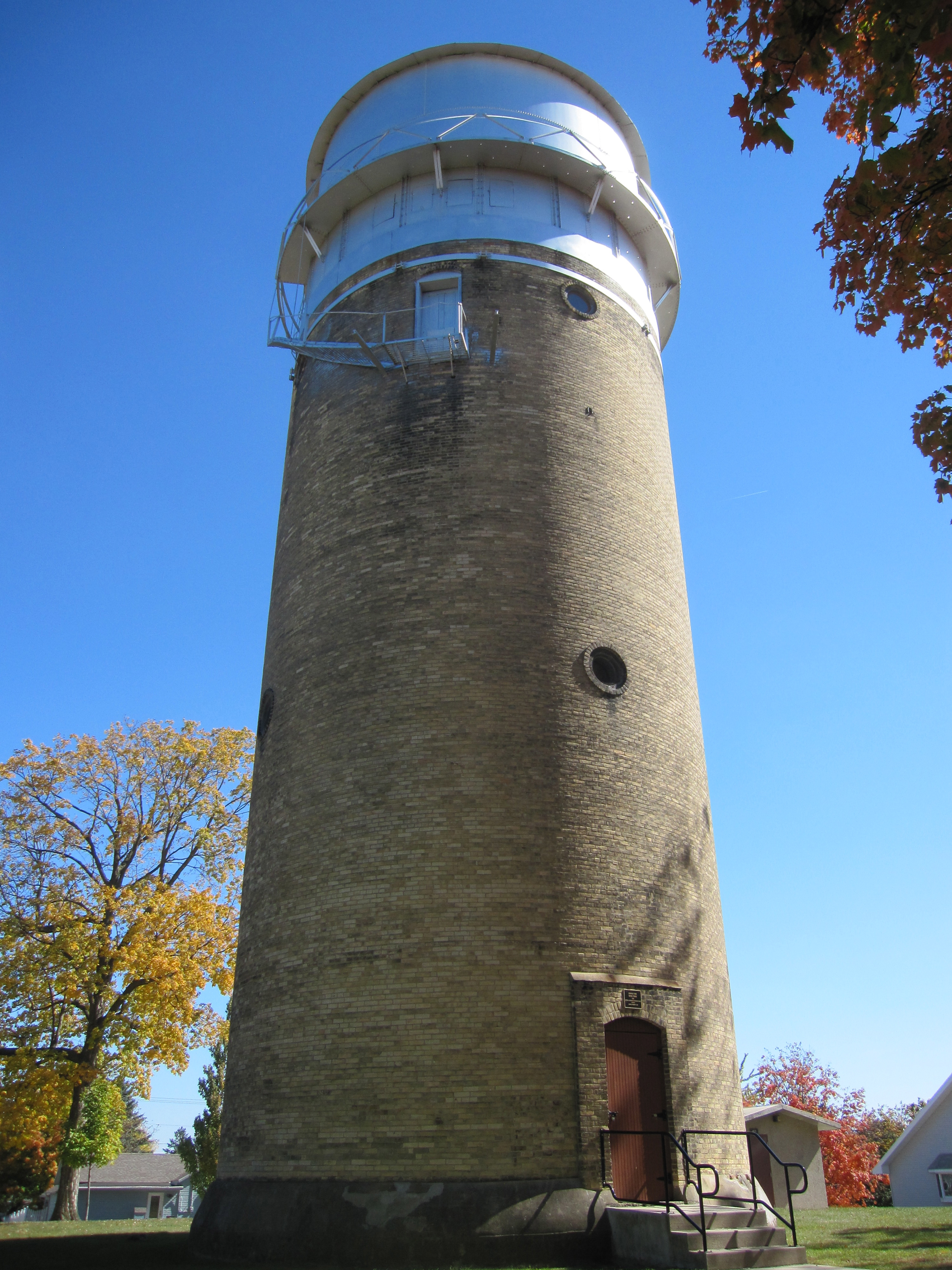

- Location within Wisconsin Location within the United States
- Location: 16th Ave. and 20th St., Monroe, Wisconsin
- Coordinates: 42°35′43″N 89°38′23″W
- Area: less than one acre
- Built: 1889
- Built by: Monroe Water Works; Des Moines Bridge and Iron Co. (tank)
- NRHP reference No.: 05001290
- Added to NRHP: November 15, 2005

The Monroe Water Tower is a historic water tower built in 1889 in Monroe, Wisconsin. It was added to the National Register of Historic Places in 2005.

The first settlers came to Monroe in the 1830s. The community grew, adding a sawmill and other small industries. The railroad came in 1858, and Monroe incorporated as a village the same year. In 1870 a fire department was organized - a major public service - but its source of water wasn't much better than a bucket brigade. In 1888 the Monroe Electric Light Company began providing electricity to homes and street lights. In the same year, the Wisconsin Telephone Company began offering limited telephone service.

In May 1889, W.H. Wheeler of Beloit offered to drill a well and build a "water works" for Monroe. The city council approved the project, agreeing to fund it if Wheeler would operate the system. Work commenced, but after some snags, Wheeler took on the city's responsibilities in exchange for a 20-year franchise to operate the water system. The project accelerated and by the end of 1889, the well was drilled, the water tower was up, and water lines were laid. A successful test was conducted on New Year's Day of 1890.

The tower was built much as it appears today. From a limestone foundation, cream brick walls rise 80 feet, forming a cylinder 28 feet across. On top of the brick walls sits a steel tank which holds 100,000 gallons of water; originally it was a wooden tank of the same capacity. The current tank is capped with a steel cone. The walls are interrupted by four porthole openings halfway up and four more just below the top of the brick. A doorway at the bottom leads inside, where a wooden staircase climbs around an inner cylinder of brick, which sheaths the pipe rising from the well and provides additional support for the tank above. Another doorway at the top of the tower opens to a metal staircase outside of the tower which leads to a catwalk around the metal tank.

Though a water tower now seems the obvious solution for a small town, different ideas were competing in 1889, and Wheeler had to defend his design. He said the elevated tank was better than pumps alone because it would reliably provide high pressure if needed to extinguish a fire. The elevated tank was better than a standpipe because Monroe didn't have a high hill to place it on, and if a standpipe was drawn down, water pressure would drop. The wooden tank, he said, would be more reliable than metal, and would better protect the water from freezing. (Costs may have played a role in his preferences too.)

The community seemed happy with the system. The Monroe Sentinel pointed out the "efficient fire protection," which would reduce insurance rates and raise property values. In homes, people had convenient water, and clean.

Wheeler initially operated the water works, but by 1898 he asked the city to take it over. In 1906 the city did buy it, for $85,000. In 1914 the wooden tank needed replacement, and the city replaced it with the current steel tank built by the Des Moines Bridge and Iron Company. That tank served the community until 1993. Then the city considered demolishing the tower, but the Monroe Historical Society worked for its preservation. The tower is considered eligible for the NRHP for two criteria: it is a good example of small-town water tower construction in the late 19th century, and it symbolizes a turning point when Monroe's government began providing major public services.

== See also ==
- National Register of Historic Places listings in Green County, Wisconsin
- Remington Water Tower
