= Fred K. Hefty =

American politician

Fred K. Hefty (September 20, 1871 – October 30, 1925) was an American farmer and politician.

Born in the town of Washington, Green County, Wisconsin, Hefty was a farmer and cattle breeder. Hefty served as chairman of the Washington Town Board and also served on the Green County Board of Supervisors. From 1923 to 1925, Hefty served in the Wisconsin State Assembly and was a Republican. Hefty died in Monticello, Wisconsin.

Hefty's family operated what is now known as the Hefty–Blum Farmstead, listed on the National Register of Historic Places.
