= H. N. Jennings House =

- H.N. Jennings House
- U.S. National Register of Historic Places
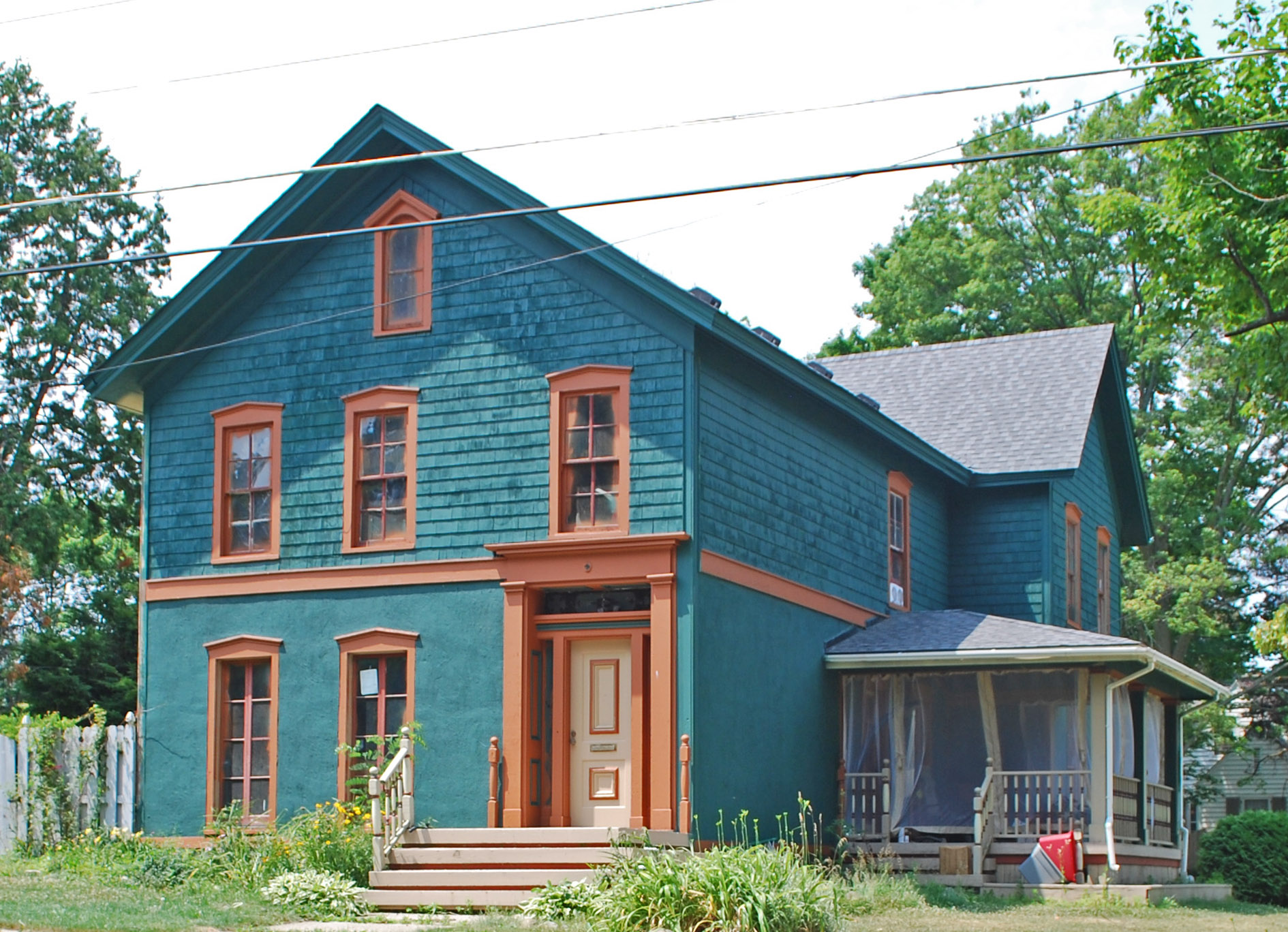

- Location within Michigan Location within the United States
- Interactive map showing the location of H.N. Jennings House
- Location: 800 S. East St., Fenton, Michigan
- Coordinates: 42°47′16″N 83°42′07″W
- Area: less than one acre
- Built: 1868
- Architectural style: Queen Anne
- MPS: Genesee County MRA
- NRHP reference No.: 82000520
- Added to NRHP: November 26, 1982

The H.N. Jennings House is a single-family home located at 800 South East Street in Fenton, Michigan. It was listed on the National Register of Historic Places in 1982.

== History ==
H. N. Jennings was the founder of The Fenton Independent, one of three popular newspapers published in Fentonville in the 1800s. Jennings was both editor and publisher of the paper. In 1868, he constructed this house on the south side of town, in an area popular with other Fentonville businessmen.

== Description ==
The H.N. Jennings House is a two-and-one-half-story frame residence. It is constructed in a Queen Anne style, but with symmetrical massing and balanced window placement that reflects a Classical influence. The front door is also clearly Classical in design, with elaborate sidelights, pilasters, a transom, and a full entablature. A Classical cornice runs across the top of the house. Queen Anne influences can be seen in the stuccoed first floor, which gives the facade a variability. As well, the side panels and the windows have a massing and detailing that is more Victorian than Classical.
