= Dr. Samuel Blumer House =

Historic house in Wisconsin, United States

- U.S. National Register of Historic Places
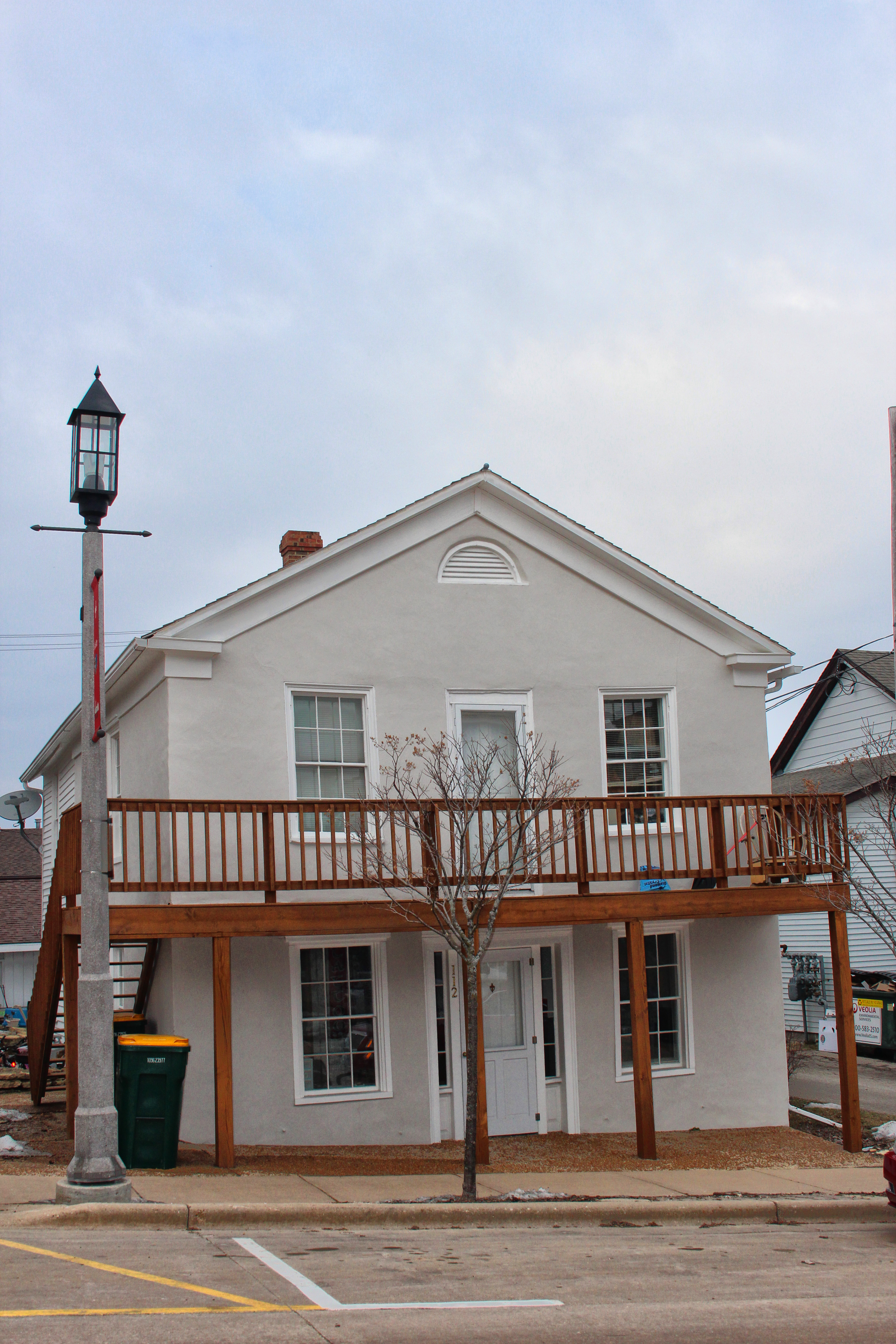

- Location within Wisconsin
- Location: 112 Sixth Ave., New Glarus, Wisconsin
- Coordinates: 42°48′53″N 89°38′05″W
- Area: less than one acre
- Architectural style: Greek Revival
- NRHP reference No.: 92001556
- Added to NRHP: November 5, 1992

The Dr. Samuel Blumer House is a historic house at 112 Sixth Avenue in New Glarus, Wisconsin.

== History ==
The two-story stone house was built circa the 1850s during the early development of New Glarus. Dr. Samuel Blumer, the first physician in New Glarus, bought the property in 1858; like most of New Glarus' first residents, Blumer was a Swiss immigrant. The house applied elements of the Greek Revival style, such as a front-facing gable with cornice returns, to traditional Swiss stone construction techniques. Abraham Kundert placed a clapboard addition on the house while using it as a hardware store in the 1870s. The house was added to the State and the National Register of Historic Places in 1992.
