= Cadiz Township Joint District No. 2 School =

- U.S. National Register of Historic Places
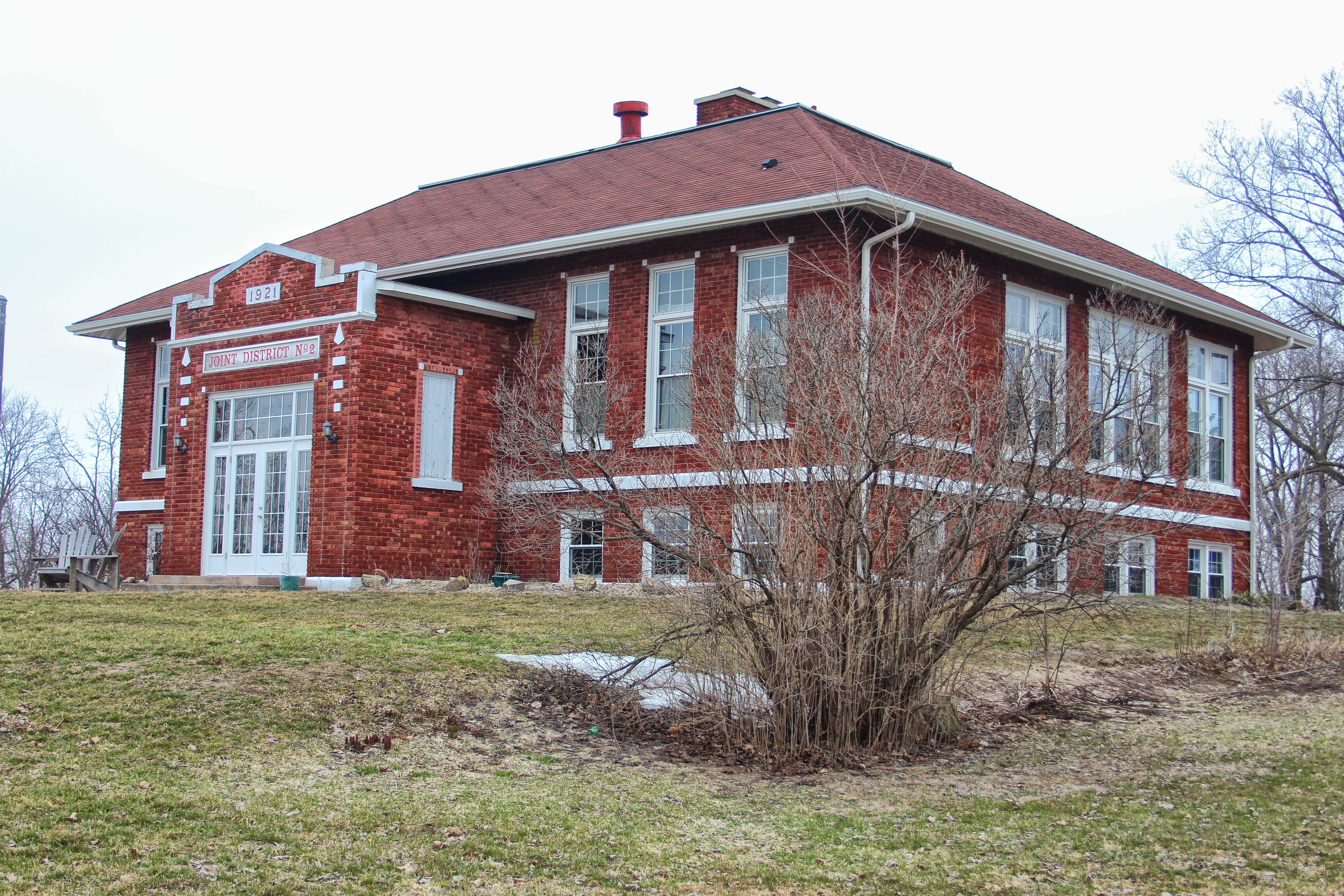
- Cadiz Township Joint District No. 2 School building

- Location within Wisconsin
- Location: 214 School St., Browntown, Wisconsin
- Coordinates: 42°34′34″N 89°47′24″W
- Area: 2 acres (0.81 ha)
- Built: 1921
- Architectural style: Craftsman
- NRHP reference No.: 96000419
- Added to NRHP: April 12, 1996

The Cadiz Township Joint District No. 2 School building is a former school at 214 School Street in Browntown, Wisconsin.

== History ==
The school was built in 1921 to replace the district's 1884 school building, which was condemned by the state the previous year; under Wisconsin law at the time, state school inspectors had the authority to close school buildings they deemed "unsanitary or unsafe". The new building was constructed to the standards of a State Graded school, which included multiple classrooms, library space, and facilities for vocational and domestic education. Schools with two classrooms, such as the Cadiz Township school, were classified as Second Class State Graded schools, which those with three or more classrooms were marked as First Class. It was one of only two State Graded schools built in rural Green County prior to 1950; despite the state's efforts, one-room schoolhouses vastly outnumbered multi-room Graded schools in rural areas statewide. The school became part of Monroe's school district in 1961 and absorbed several rural schools in a wave of school consolidation; it closed amid declining enrollment in 1983.

The building was added to the State Register of Historic Places in 1995 and to the National Register of Historic Places the following year. It currently serves as a private residence.
