= Albert M. Ten Eyck =

American agricultural academic

Albert M. Ten Eyck (1869–1958) was an American agricultural academic and a farmer.

== Biography ==
Ten Eyck was born in Green County, Wisconsin in 1869. He graduated from what is now the University of Wisconsin-Madison in 1892. In 1896, Albert Ten Eyck married Wilhelmina (Minna) Carolina Maveus. One year after marriage, Albert Ten Eyck took a position as an assistant professor of Agriculture at the North Dakota Agricultural College.

Ten Eyck took over the agricultural department of Kansas State College in 1902. With the creation of the agronomy department in 1906, Ten Eyck became its head. He was also the superintendent at the Fort Hayes, Kansas Agricultural Experiment Station in 1910, which conducted research in areas of agricultural production. During his time at Kansas State College, in 1919 he built a small round barn on the experimental station campus. In 1910, Ten Eyck was named President of the American Society of Agronomy and Professor of Farm Management at Kansas State.

In 1912, he resigned from Kansas State to become Extension Professor of Soils and Crops for Iowa State College (which is now Iowa State University). Ten Eyck's later positions include Agricultural Agent for Winnebago County, Illinois from 1914 to 1917.

In 1918, Ten Eyck and his wife and kids took over his Ten Eyck family's farm in Green County, Wisconsin. Three years later, in 1922 they built a noted round barn, now known as the Albert and Minna Ten Eyck Round Barn, that is listed on the State and the National Register of Historic Places.

Ten Eyck died in 1958 at the age of 88.
