= Frank L. Chenoweth House =

Historic house in Wisconsin, United States

- U.S. National Register of Historic Places
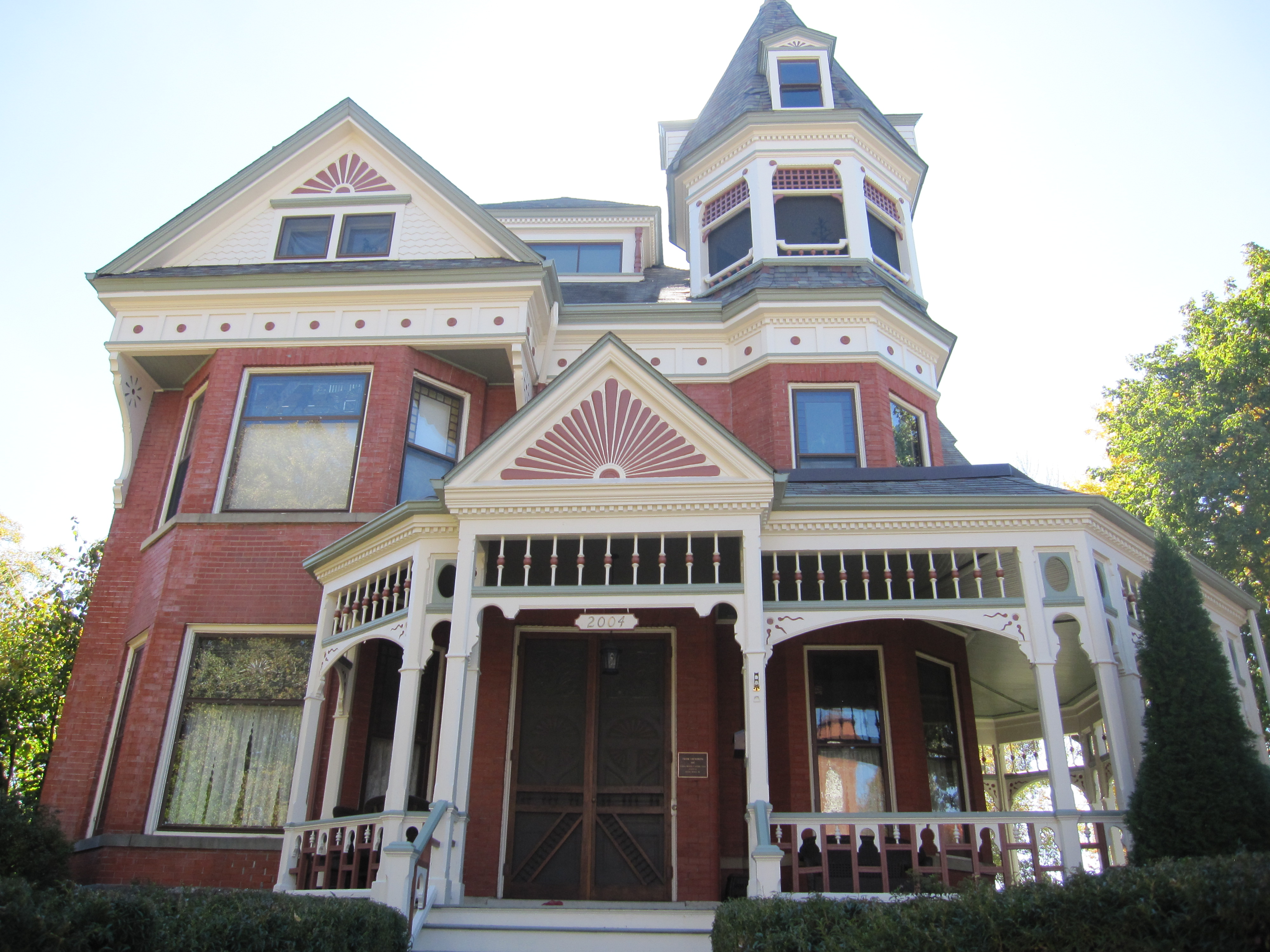
- Frank L. Chenoweth House

- Location within Wisconsin
- Location: 2004 10th St., Monroe, Wisconsin
- Coordinates: 42°36′07″N 89°38′05″W
- Area: less than one acre
- Built: 1888-1889
- Architectural style: Queen Anne
- NRHP reference No.: 76000064
- Added to NRHP: October 8, 1976

The Frank L. Chenoweth House is a historic house at 2004 10th Street in Monroe, Wisconsin.

== History ==
Frank L. Chenoweth, a wealthy local merchant and the son of early resident Benjamin Chenoweth, built the house in 1888-89. The two-and-a-half story house has a Queen Anne design featuring a wraparound front porch with ornamental spindlework, a pediment with a sunburst design above the entrance, and a projecting bay topped by a large bracketed pediment with a matching sunburst. The complex roof includes a cornice and patterned frieze and is topped by a three-story octagonal tower with a spire. Chenoweth was socially prominent in Monroe, and he hosted many large parties and gatherings at his house.

The house was listed on the National Register of Historic Places in 1976 and on the State Register of Historic Places in 1989.
