= Pure Oil =

Chicago-based American petroleum company

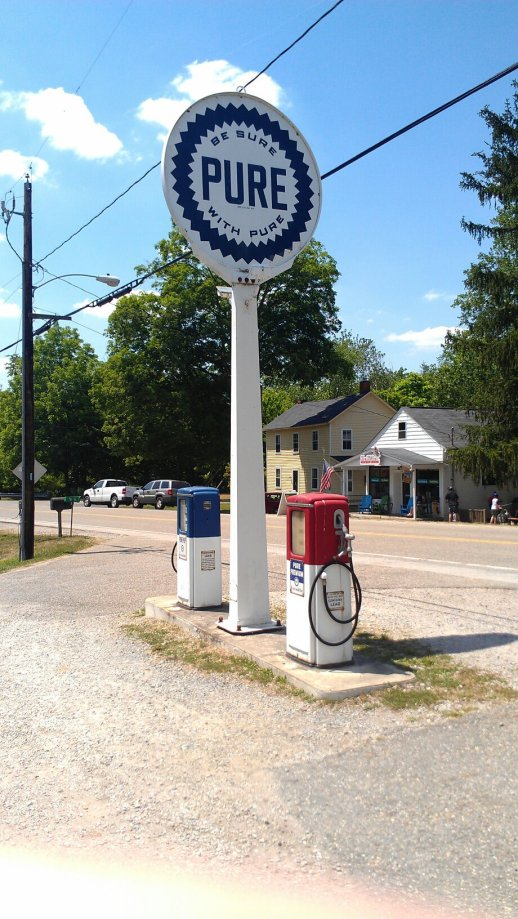
- Vintage Pure Oil sign located at Cuyahoga Valley National Park near Richfield, Ohio.
- Type: Public
- Industry: Petroleum
- Founded: 1914
- Defunct: 1970
- Fate: Rebranded to Union 76.
- Headquarters: Chicago
- Number of locations: 16,000 (1957)
- Area served: South, Midwest, Mid-Atlantic
- Parent: Unocal Corporation (1965 — 1970)

Pure Oil Company was a major American petroleum company founded in 1914, involved in oil production, refining, and marketing, and best known for its national network of branded gasoline stations in the United States.

== History ==
=== Early history ===
Three companies operating in the United States have used the Pure Oil name. The first began as a group of independent oil refiners, producers, and pipeline operators, in fall 1895 in Butler, Pennsylvania, with headquarters in Pittsburgh, although it was incorporated in New Jersey. Pure was organized by independent interests to counter to the dominance of Standard Oil Company in the Pennsylvania oil fields, and was the second vertically integrated oil company (after Standard) in the region. Operations were based in Oil City, Pennsylvania. David Kirk was elected the first president. He was succeeded in 1896 by James W. Lee. The company sold illuminating oil in Philadelphia and New York City. They also built bulk terminals in Amsterdam and Hamburg and competed in Europe with Standard Oil, the Nobel and Rothschild families, and Deutsche Bank.

Pure Oil Producing Co. was incorporated in 1902. In 1904 a refinery was built on the Delaware River which received 600 barrels per day (95 m^{3}/d) from the United States Pipe Line. This increased to 1,800 barrels per day (290 m^{3}/d) by 1906. The Pennoil tanker delivered oil to Europe.

=== Dawes period ===
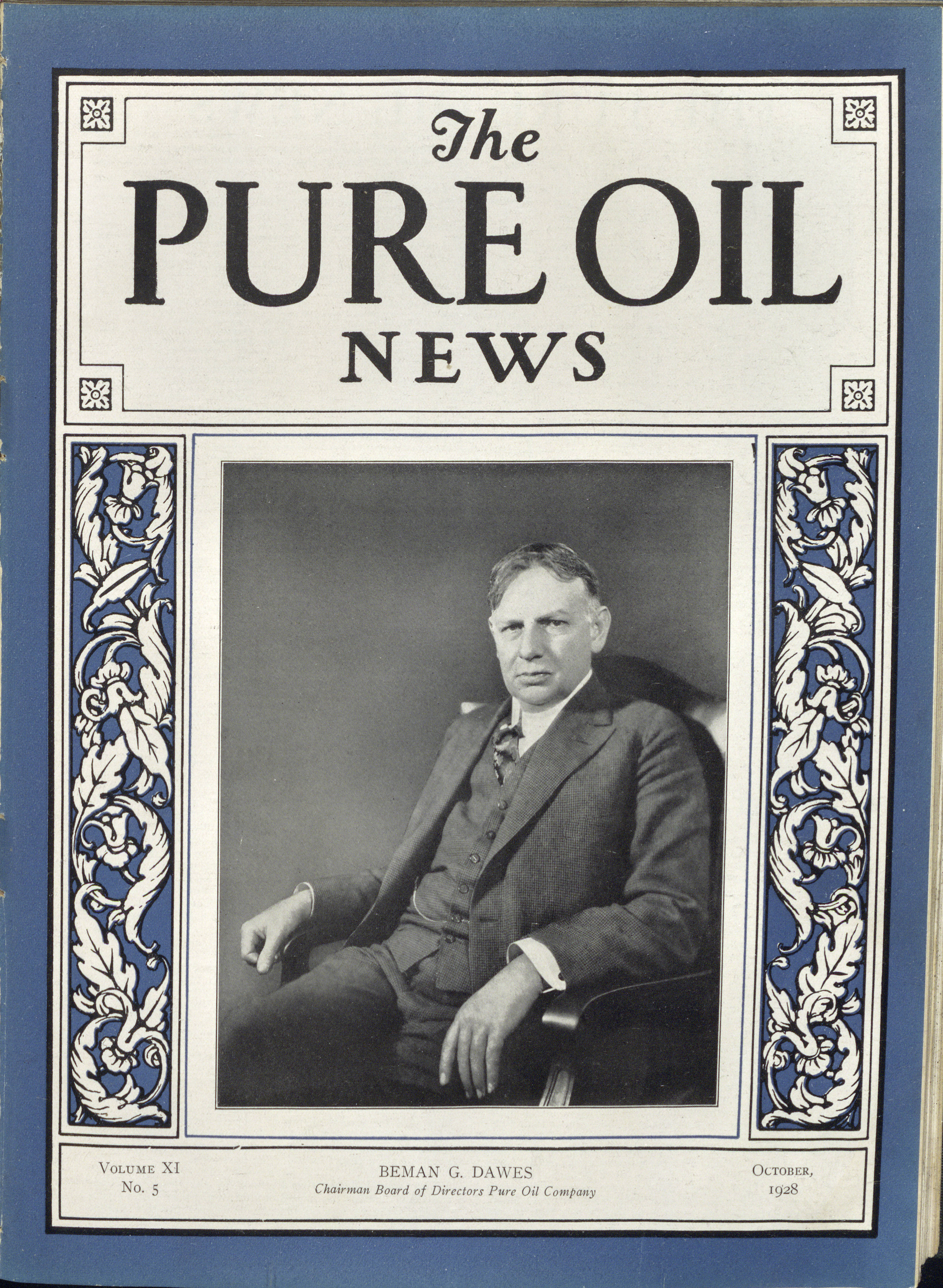
"The Pure Oil News" October 1928 issue featuring Beman G. Dawes on cover.

Beman Gates Dawes and his business partner Fletcher Heath founded the Ohio Cities Gas Company. The Ohio Cities Gas Company was acquiring leases in Ohio and West Virginia. One of their properties was the Cabin Creek area in West Virginia. In 1914, men drilling for natural gas at this property instead found a huge oil field; one well produced 214 barrels during the first 24 hours. Beman was sent a telegram immediately about the discovery and property value increase; at that time he was in property sales negotiations. He had not sold the lease and now had land that was producing oil of excellent quality. Cabin Creek oil was promoted as high quality by its transparent, amber color. Beman had become an oil man overnight - the company’s dominant interest shifting to oil production.

In 1918, Ohio Cities Gas rented an eight-story building located on North High and Chestnut, in downtown Columbus. The Ohio-based company acquired the Pure Oil Company in 1920 and adopted its name to show its shift from natural gas to oil.

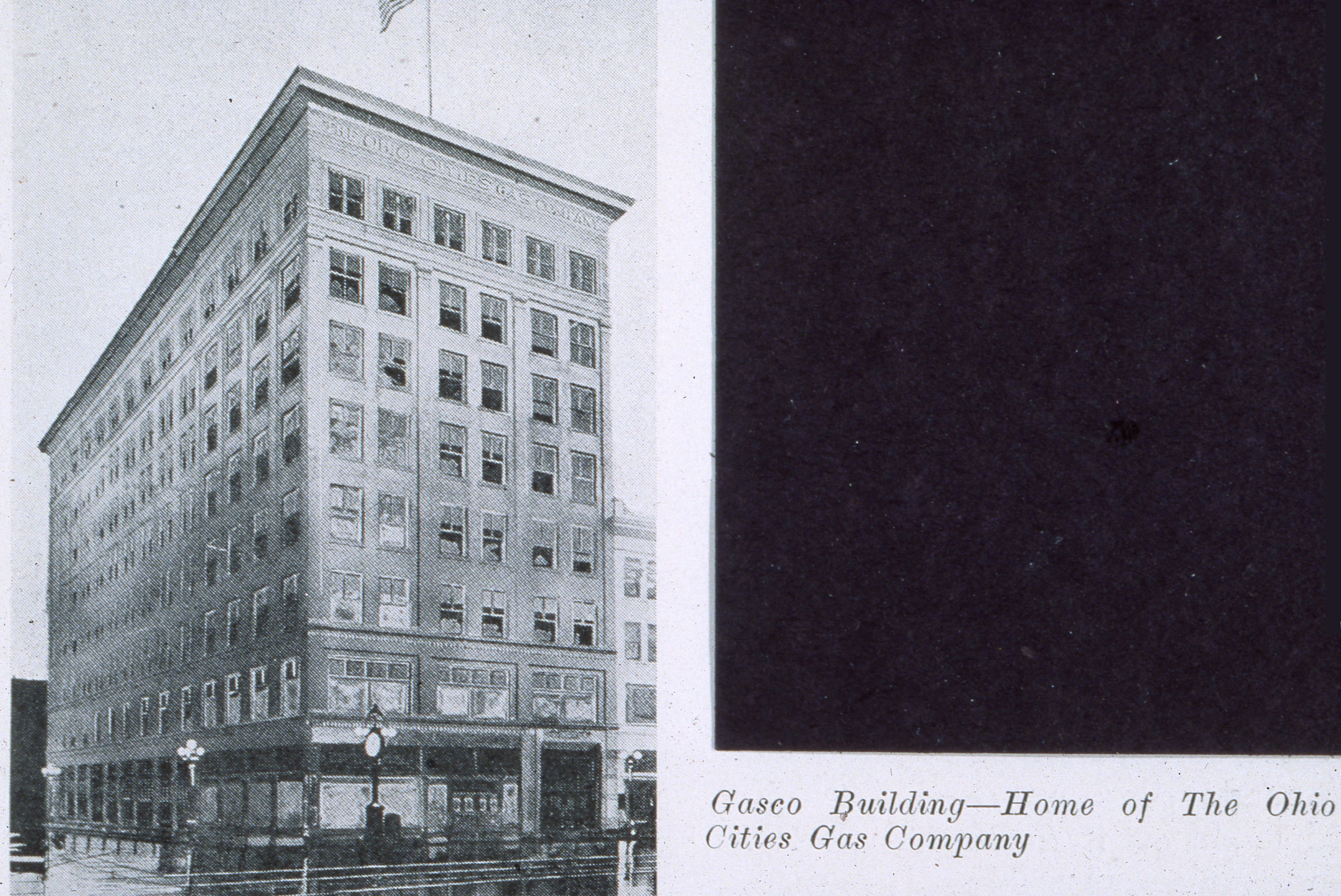
Pure Oil Company building in Columbus, Ohio

In 1924 Beman moved to chairman of the board of directors, and his younger brother Henry Dawes took over as president. Its main headquarters moved in 1926 to Chicago to act as a center point for Pure’s national business reach, as well as closer to Henry’s Evanston residence. Pure Oil took over seven floors of the Jewelers Building at 35 East Wacker Drive.

Refineries were located in Ohio, West Virginia, Oklahoma, and Texas. One Ohio refinery was named the Heath refinery after Fletcher Heath. This is how the town of Heath, Ohio got its name.

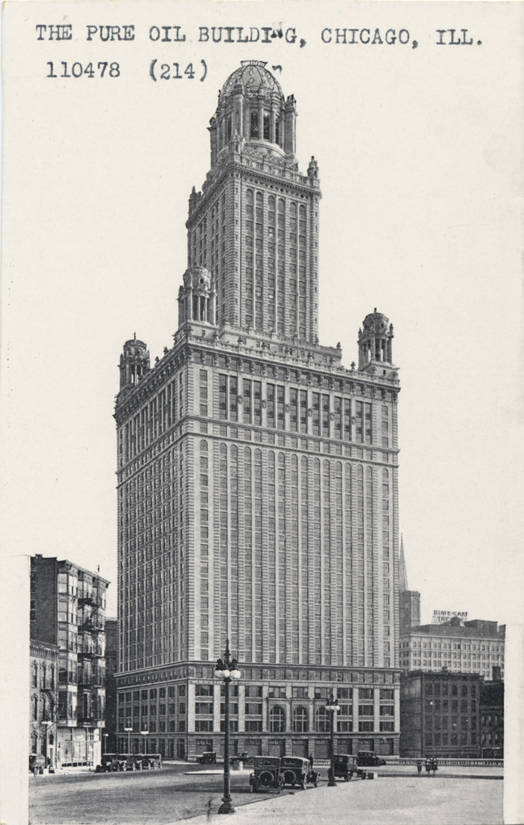
Pure Oil Company building in Chicago, IL

The company’s art director and cartoonist Otis H. Hosom designed a new seal featuring the PURE name surrounded by a serrated circle border in 1930. Although the border resembled a gear, the company insisted that the border was not a gear and never to be spoken as such. The seal appears on all advertising and products from this point on.

The famous “Be Sure With Pure” slogan came not from the advertising department but from a 1930s Canton schoolteacher. W.J.E. Myers wrote a letter stating “I feel sure with Pure” to address his overextended credit, due to summer unemployment. The company erased the teacher’s debt and gave him gasoline books equivalent to $143.

By the 1960s, sales were $700 million a year, and Pure Oil ranked as one of the country's 100 largest industrial companies. Over 1,000 worked in the Chicago area. The headquarters at that time were located in unincorporated Palatine, Illinois now Schaumburg, Illinois, in a building which is now a campus of Roosevelt University.

The bright red Firebird logo premiered in 1961. Firebird gasoline coincided with Pure’s sponsorship as the official fuel of NASCAR.

=== Union 76 and decline ===
Union Oil Company of California (Unocal) purchased Pure Oil in 1965. Initially, Pure Oil's Refining & Marketing operations became the Pure Oil Division of Union Oil Company of California with the Pure Oil name continuing in full force. By 1970 the Pure Oil brand was phased out and remaining service stations and auto/truck stops were rebranded as Union 76. The Pure Oil Division was merged with Unocal's west coast Refining & Marketing division to become the Union 76 division.

After 1970, the Pure Oil name was retained as a registered trademark, while the Firebird brand name was retained and used primarily for motor oils and lubricants that were not extensively marketed toward consumers.

In 1992, Unocal announced plans to end Southeast operations. The Union 76 brand was taken over by Phillips 66 while Unocal was later bought by Chevron Corporation.

In 1996, Pure Oil became the holding company for three independent pipeline companies. By 1997, operations in Europe ended.

Sunoco replaced Pure Oil, now called Union 76, as the official fuel of NASCAR in 2003.

=== Pure Oil Jobbers Cooperative ===
The Southeastern Oil Jobbers Cooperative, Inc. (SOJO), began as a result of Unocal's departure from the Southeast. Independent operators wanted a cooperative "of marketers, by marketers, and for marketers", which would let members make decisions on their own. Each member joins by buying a share of stock and paying an initiation fee. Since 1996, the members have received a dividend every year.

The cooperative provides signs and images to member stations for consistent marketing of its products. It has the right to the Pure Oil brand name and Firebird logo for selling Pure Oil and SOJO petroleum products in Florida, Georgia, Alabama, Mississippi, Louisiana, Arkansas, Tennessee, North Carolina, South Carolina, and Virginia. It also has the right to expand the use of the name and trademark anywhere in the United States.

In 2008, the cooperative changed its name to Pure Oil Jobbers Cooperative.

== Service stations ==
Pure Oil opened its first service stations in Dayton, Ohio in 1918. Initially, its stations were an architecturally heterogenous blend of both buildings Pure Oil had constructed and those designed by companies it had purchased.

=== English cottage stations ===
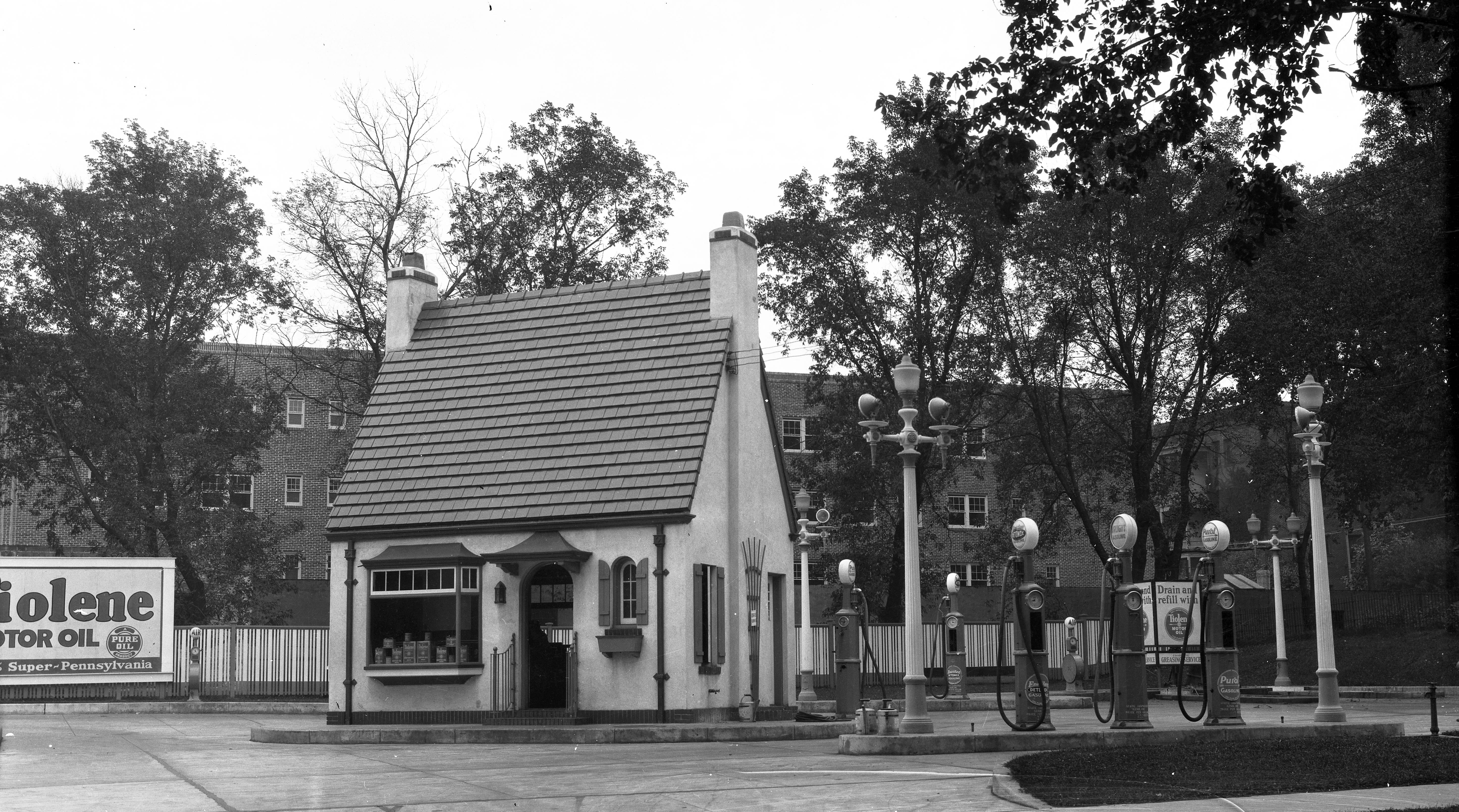
Pure Oil station in Minneapolis, Minnesota in 1928

Carl August Peterson, an experienced gas station architect, was hired in late 1925 to lead the company's new marketing construction department. Peterson aimed to create a design with cheap construction and material costs, but that still had a distinct and recognizable appearance. Additionally, he was also required to display Pure Oil's blue and white corporate livery prominently in his design, while making the structure acceptable in neighborhoods that were opposed to brightly colored gas stations.

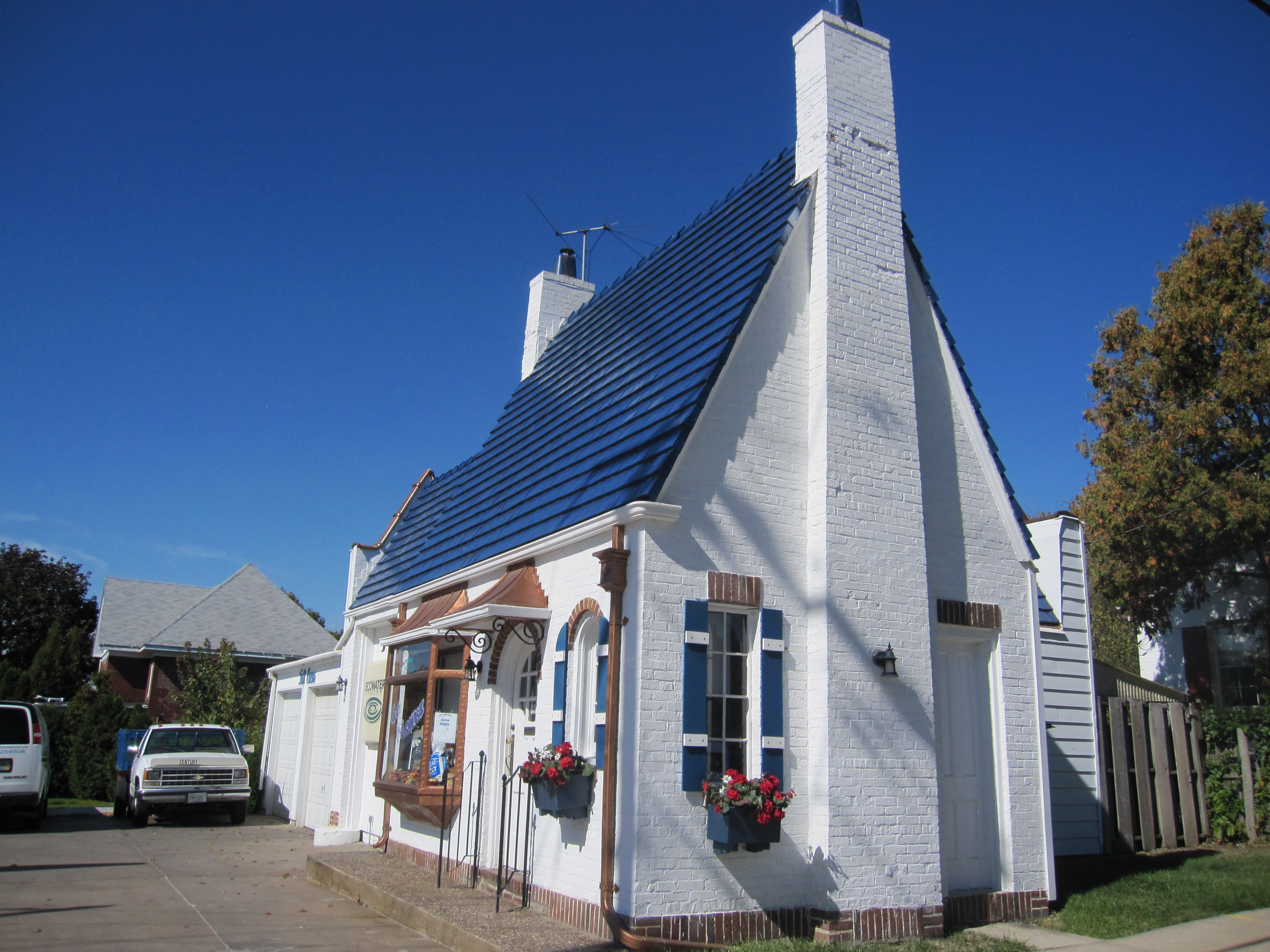
A standard cottage-style service station in Monroe, Wisconsin, built in 1935.

In 1927 Pure Oil unveiled Peterson's final design, which he called the "English cottage." It featured a design reminiscent of private homes as an effort to make the stations comfortable for motorists, and incorporated many aspects of the popular Tudor Revival architecture of the time. These included details such as rounded doorways, chimney pots, window shutters, and flowerboxes.

In addition to the home-like structural design, the stations were designed to make their corporate affiliation obvious from a distance. The walls of the building were made of white brick and the roof was covered in gloss blue Ludowici tile, specified in spite of its expensive cost because of its non-fading properties. These features gave the stations a balanced divide between the two corporate colors of Pure Oil.

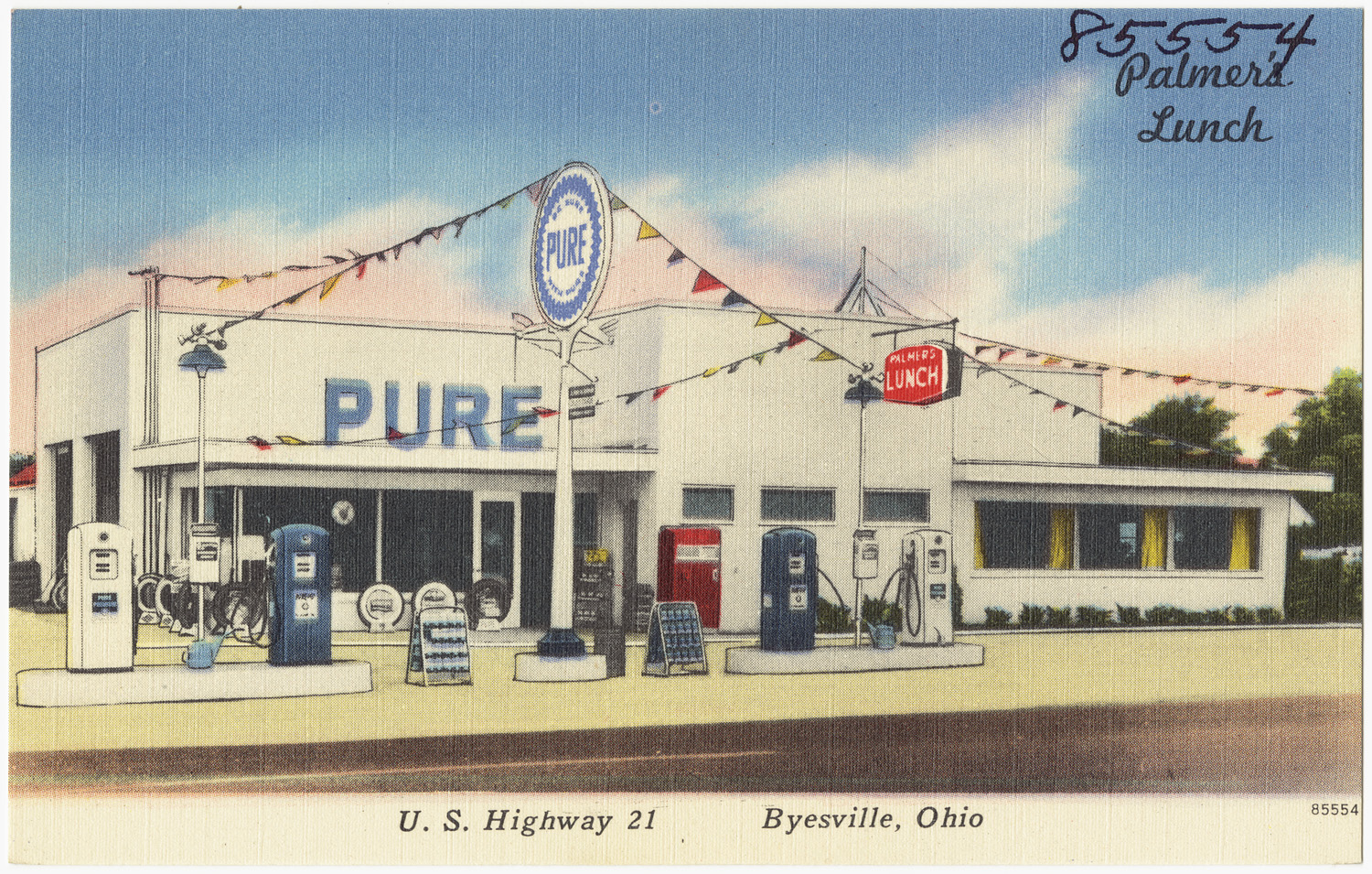
Postcard showing a later Pure Oil station with a lunch counter, ca. 1930-1945.

Peterson oversaw and designed many variations on his initial design to account for economic, geographic, and other regional differences. The English cottage became an icon for the company, with more constructed into the 1930s. Pure Oil produced birdhouses and radios designed to look like their stations and found they were big sellers. A half-size replica produced for the 1933 World's Fair was a top attraction.

The final variant of the English cottage design was introduced in 1946, and from that point on Pure Oil began to embrace influences of Modern architecture in their stations. Peterson retired from Pure Oil in 1957, and the company stopped making his English cottages after Pure Oil's merger with Union Oil in 1965.

Since Pure Oil's end, many of their former stations have been added to the National Register of Historic Places.

== Additional Resources ==
The Dawes Arboretum in Newark, Ohio was founded by Beman Gates Dawes and his wife Bertie Burr Dawes. Its archives contain manuscripts, photographs, and other Pure Oil Company artifacts with a majority created during the Dawes period. The Arboretum archive is open to researchers by appointment only.
