= Caradine Building =

- U.S. National Register of Historic Places
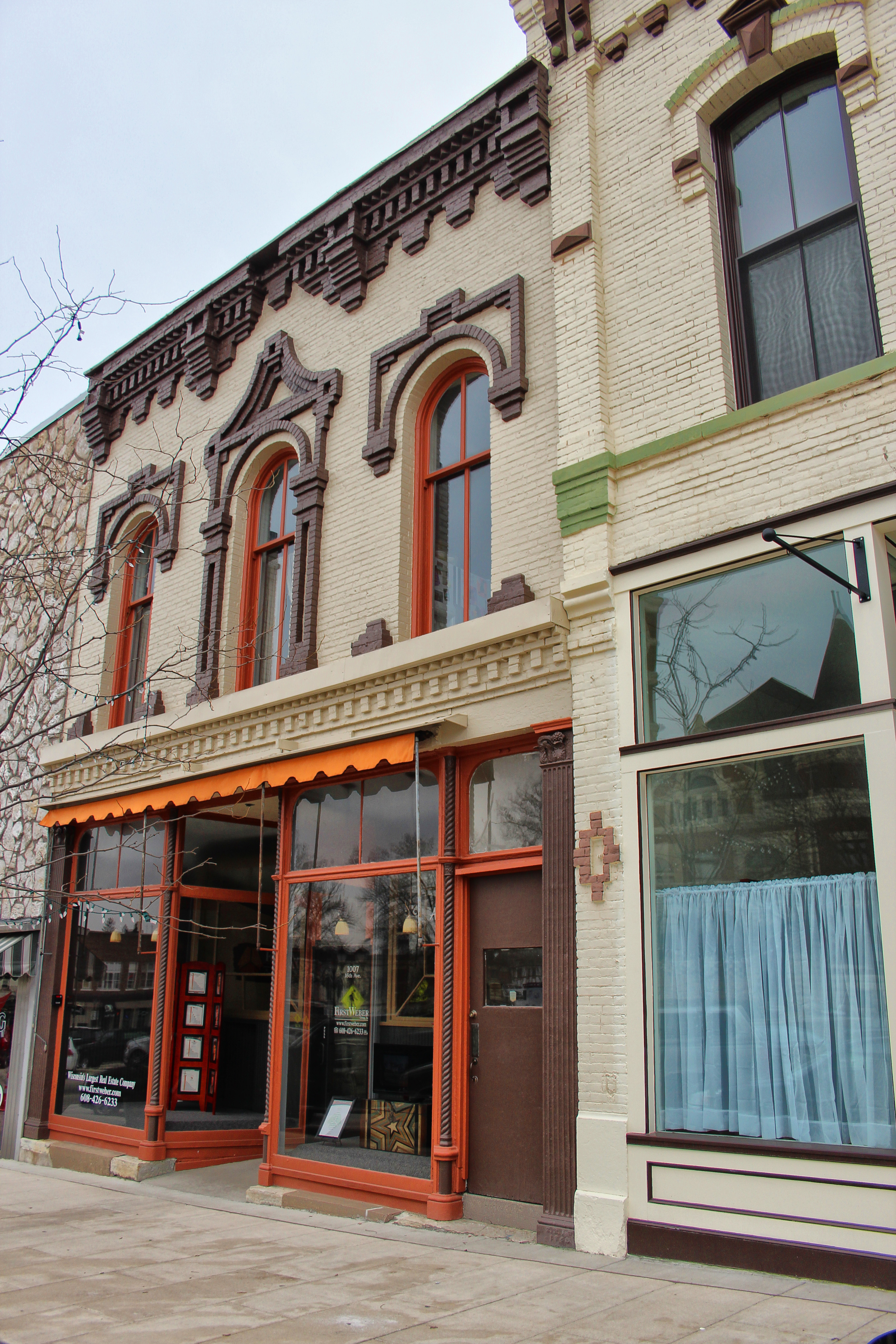

- Location within Wisconsin
- Location: 1007 16th Ave., Monroe, Wisconsin
- Coordinates: 42°36′07″N 89°38′24″W
- Area: 0.1 acres (0.040 ha)
- Built: 1869
- Architect: G. F. Schultze
- Architectural style: Victorian
- NRHP reference No.: 79000081
- Added to NRHP: May 8, 1979

The Caradine Building is a historic commercial building at 1007 16th Avenue in Monroe, Wisconsin. Elisha Mosher, a merchant and local politician, had the building constructed in 1869. Architect G. F. Schultze of Janesville designed the Victorian building, which was a smaller-scale version of his Baker-Fredendall Building in Janesville. The two-story building's design includes a first-floor storefront with plate glass windows, a brick cornice above the first floor, arched second-story windows with dark brick trim, and a dentillated and corbelled cornice. Dentist W. H. Caradine opened an office on the second floor in 1907, and he purchased the building in 1915; his son and grandson also operated dental practices in the building.

The building was added to the National Register of Historic Places on May 8, 1979.
