= Kahn-Jennings House =

Historic house in Arkansas, United States

- U.S. National Register of Historic Places
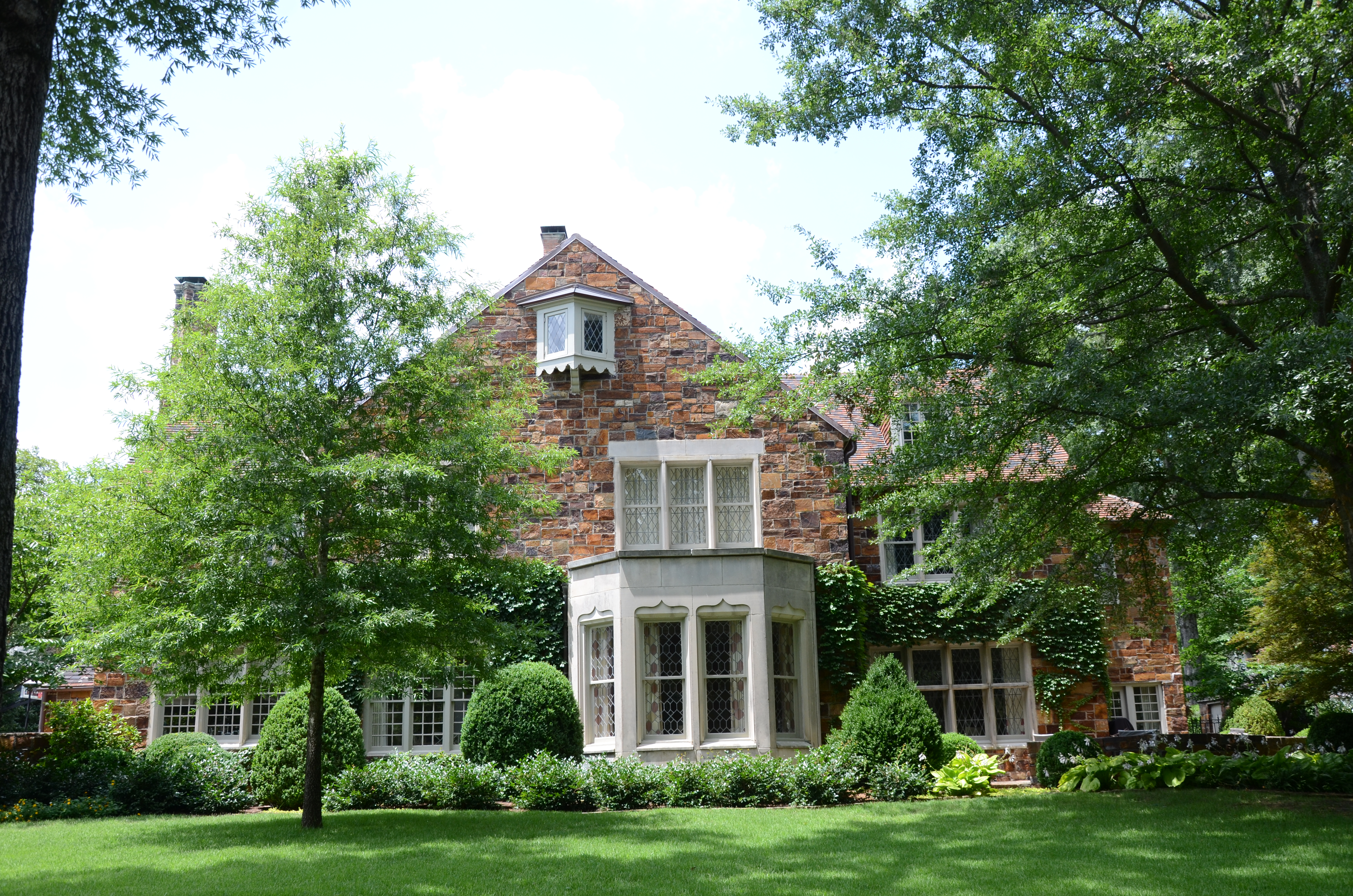

- Location within Arkansas Location within the United States
- Location: 5300 Sherwood St., Little Rock, Arkansas
- Coordinates: 34°45′54″N 92°19′56″W
- Area: 1 acre (0.40 ha)
- Architect: Maximillian F. Mayer
- Architectural style: Renaissance, Tudor Revival, French Renaissance
- NRHP reference No.: 92001223
- Added to NRHP: September 8, 1992

The Kahn-Jennings House is a historic house at 5300 Sherwood Street in Little Rock, Arkansas. It is a large 2 1/2-story structure, finished in stone, that was designed to resemble a large English country house. It was designed by Little Rock architect Max Mayer for Sidney Kahn, the real estate developer of the Prospect Terrace area in which it is located. At the time, the area would have afforded fine views of central Little Rock, and was marketed as an exclusive upper-class area.

The house was listed on the National Register of Historic Places in 1992.

== See also ==
- National Register of Historic Places listings in Little Rock, Arkansas
