= White Building (Warsaw) =

Historic building in Warsaw, Poland

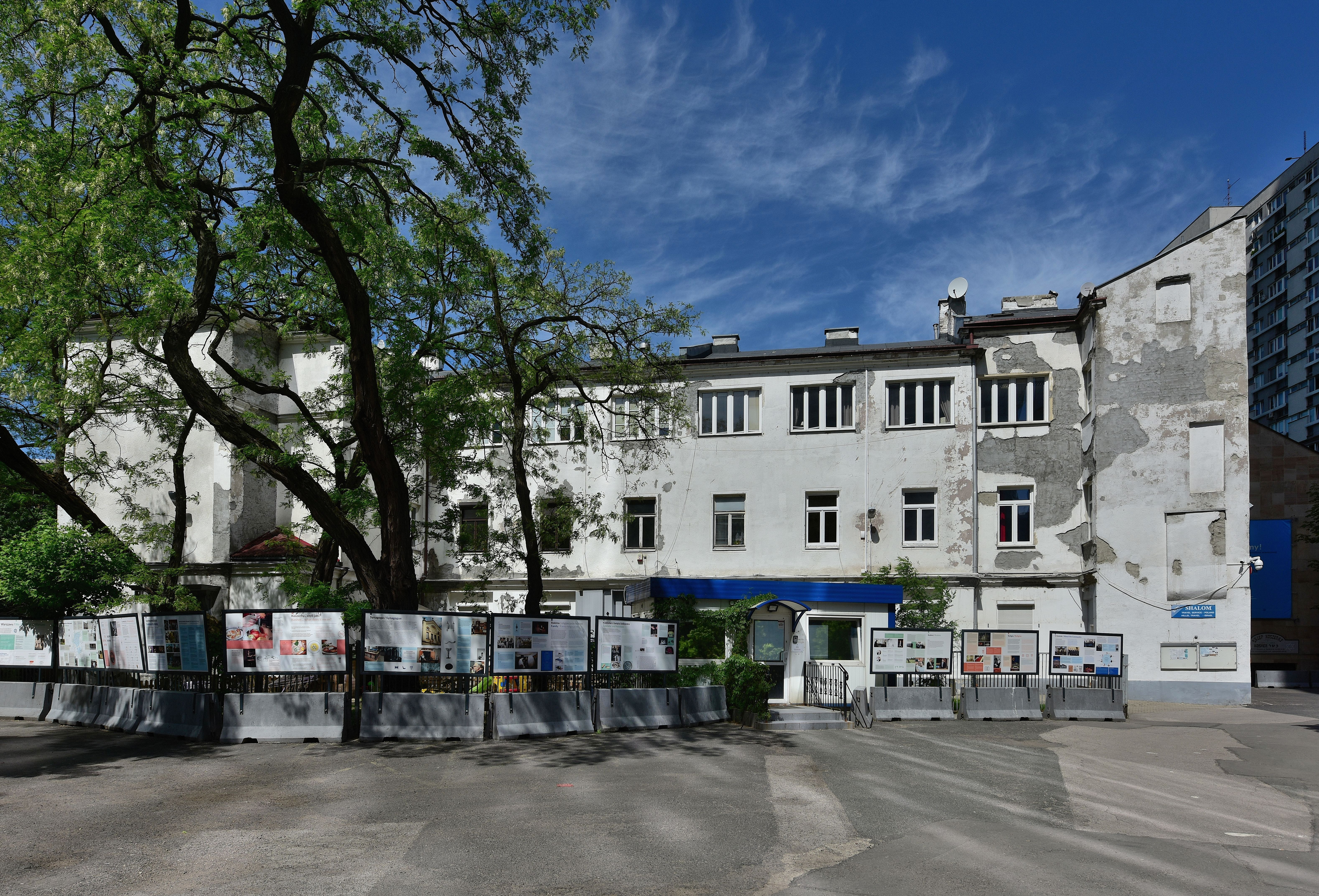
- The White Building in 2018.
- Interactive map of the White Building area

General information
- Type: Office building
- Location: Downtown, Warsaw, Poland, 6 Twarda Street
- Coordinates: 52°14′09.00″N 21°00′03.40″E
- Completed: 19th century

Technical details
- Floor count: 3

The White Building (Polish: Biały Budynek) is a historic three-storey-tall building in Warsaw, Poland, located in the neighbourhood of North Downtown, at 6 Twarda Street. It was built prior to 1869, and is now used as an office building of the Union of Jewish Religious Communities in Poland.

== History ==
It was built prior to 1896, as an outbuilding to a tenement which no longer exists. Together with Nożyk Synagogue it is the last remaining element of a former historic complex of buildings at 6 Twarda Street.

During the Second World War, it was used as a polyclinic of Judaism commune, and after its end, a registry centre for the Holocaust survivors. The building contains wall inspirations in Yiddish and Hebrew, dating to that era, which are now a protected cultural property.

The building is now the headquarters of the Union of Jewish Religious Communities in Poland and the Children of the Holocaust Association, and until 2019, also the publishing house of journal Midrasz.

In 2021, the building received the status of a protected cultural property. The Union of Jewish Religious Communities in Poland had proposed to construct in its place an office skyscraper, however it was rejected in 2022 by Ministry of Culture and National Heritage, due to its protected status.
