= Judge John A. Bingham House =

Historic house in Wisconsin, United States

- U.S. National Register of Historic Places
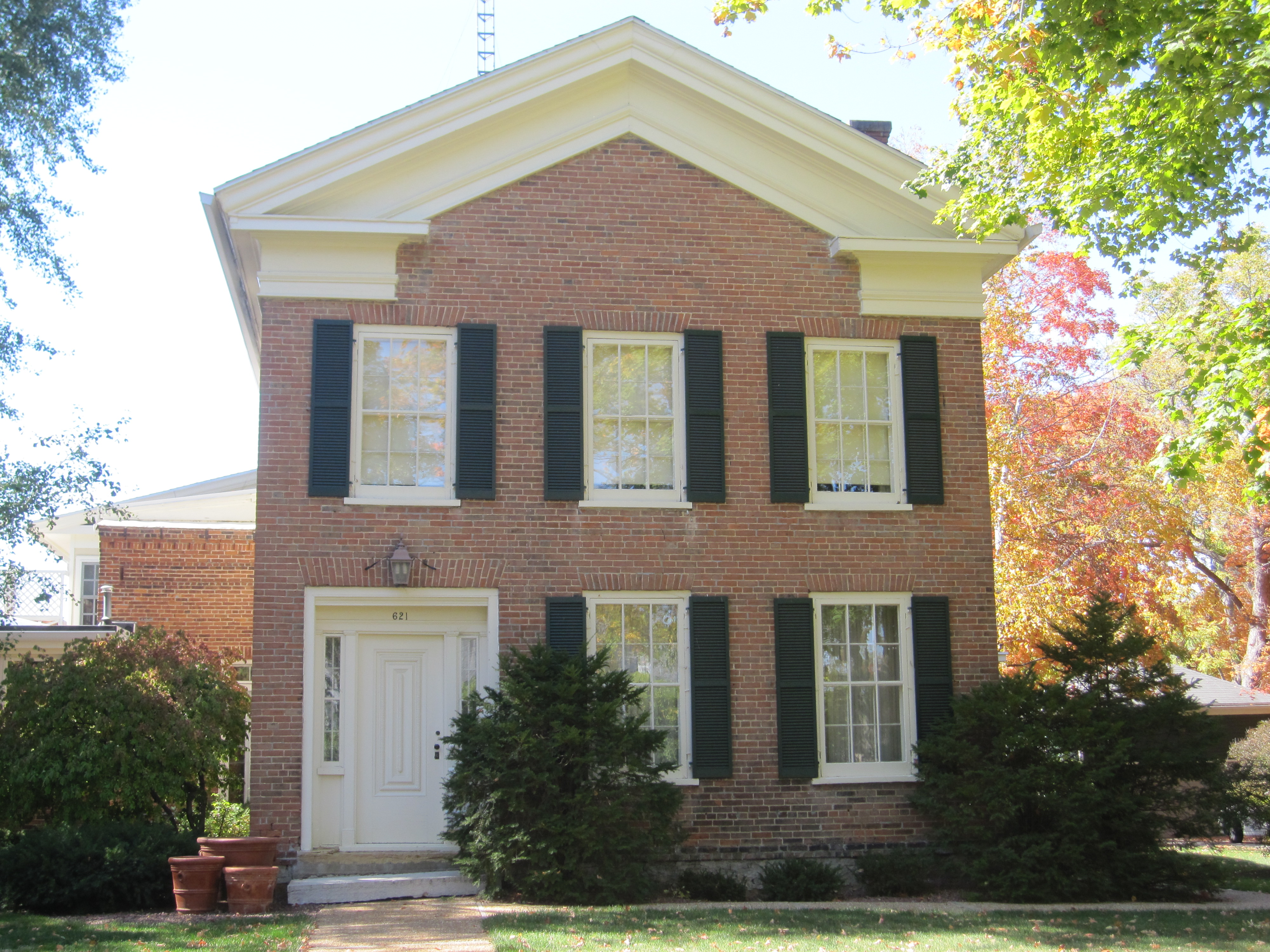
- Judge John A. Bingham House

- Location within Wisconsin
- Location: 621 14th Ave., Monroe, Wisconsin
- Coordinates: 42°36′21″N 89°38′31″W
- Area: less than one acre
- Built: 1850
- Built by: Norman Churchill
- Architectural style: Greek Revival
- NRHP reference No.: 76000063
- Added to NRHP: January 2, 1976

The Judge John A. Bingham House is a historic house at 621 14th Avenue in Monroe, Wisconsin.

== History ==
John A. Bingham held a number prominent local positions, including District Attorney of Green County, Wisconsin. He also co-founded the State Bank of Monroe, the first bank in Green County, and later founded the First National Bank of Monroe. His house was built in 1950 by carpenter Norman Churchill. The two-story house has a Greek Revival design with an entablature and pilasters around the entrance, sash windows, and a front-facing gable with cornice returns.

The house was listed on the National Register of Historic Places in 1976 and on the State Register of Historic Places in 1989.
