= John C. and Barbara Steinman House =

Historic house in Wisconsin, United States

- U.S. National Register of Historic Places
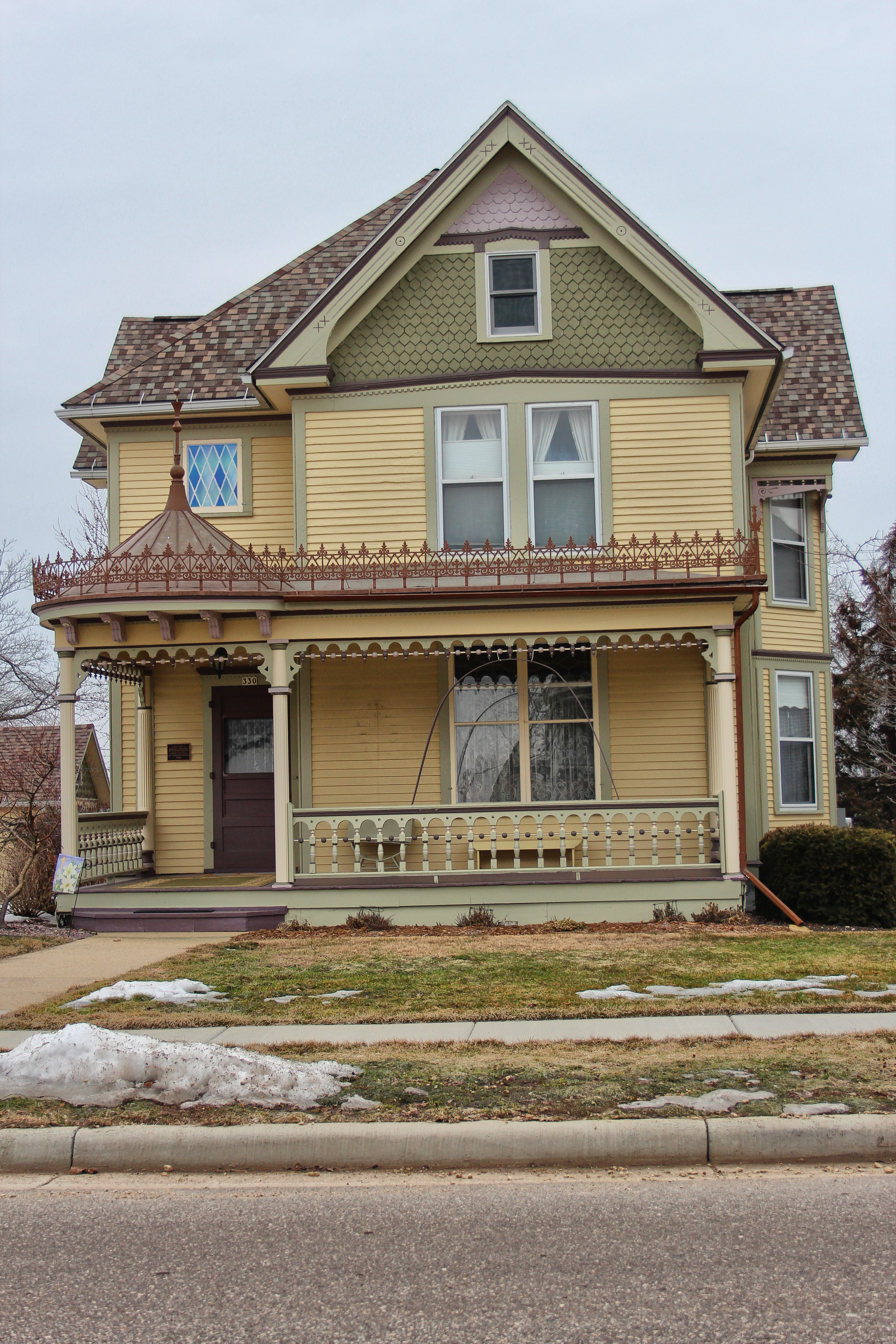
- John C. and Barbara Steinman House
- Location: 330 S. Monroe St., Monticello, Green County, Wisconsin
- Coordinates: 42°44′34″N 89°35′42″W
- Area: less than one acre
- Built: 1903-1904
- Architectural style: Queen Anne
- NRHP reference No.: 03001215
- Added to NRHP: November 26, 2003

The John C. and Barbara Steinman House is a historic house at 330 South Monroe Street in Monticello, Green County, Wisconsin.

== History ==
The two-and-a-half story house was constructed in 1903-04 for John C. and Barbara Legler Steinman. John C. Steinman was active in various businesses, including serving as a partner in a general merchandise business; he also served in several positions in Green County government. The Steinmans' house has a Queen Anne design, a popular style in America from the 1880s through the 1900s. The design includes a front porch with a balustrade and decorative woodwork, metal edging around the top of the porch, a turret above the front entrance, and a hip roof with cross gables and patterned shingles on the gable ends. The Steinmans lived in the house until Barbara's death in 1937 and John's death in 1942.

The house was listed on the State and the National Register of Historic Places in 2003.
