= Freitag's Pure Oil Service Station =

- U.S. National Register of Historic Places
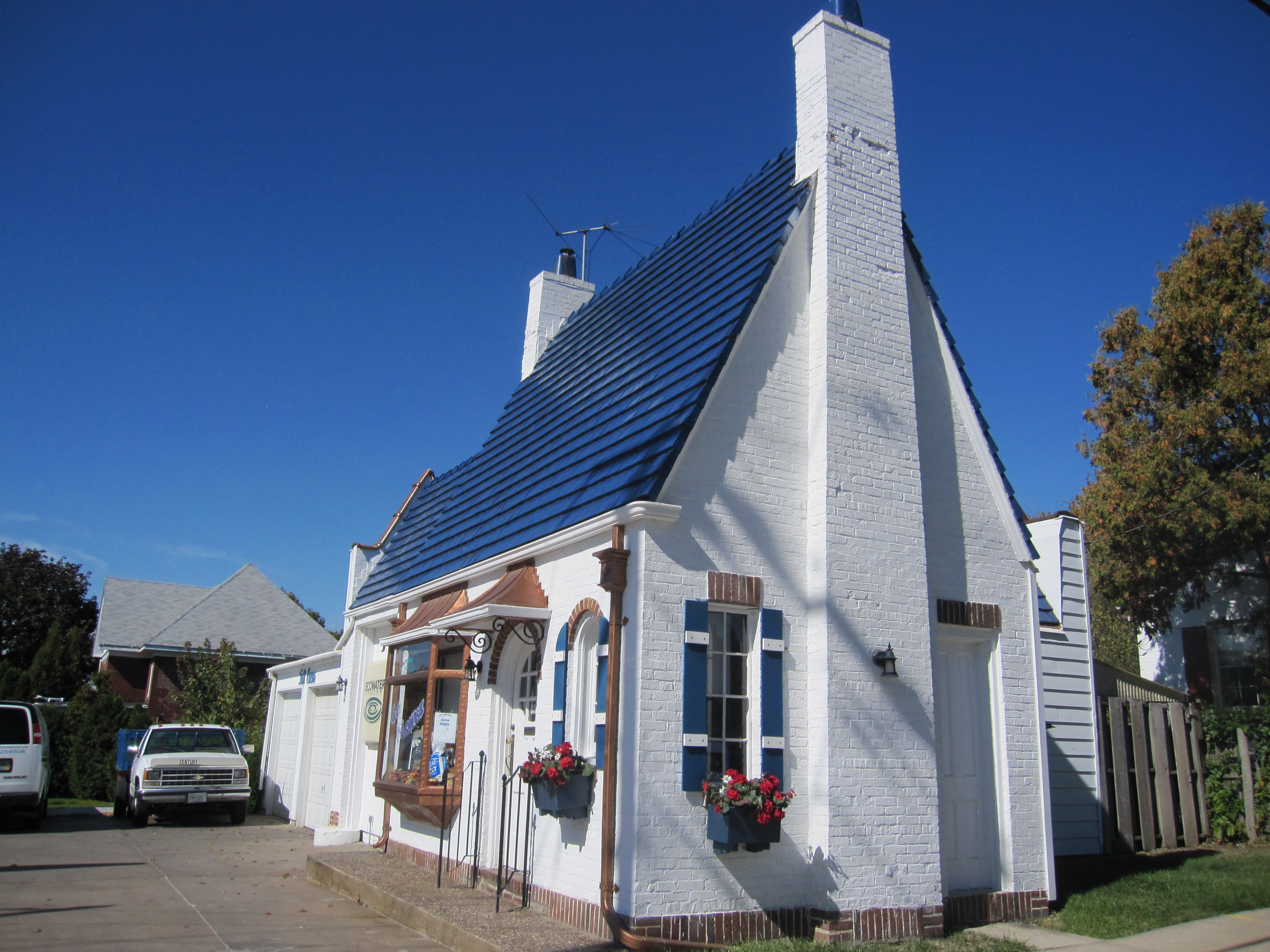

- Location within Wisconsin Location within the United States
- Location: 1323 9th St. Monroe, Wisconsin
- Coordinates: 42°36′11″N 89°38′28″W
- Area: 0.1 acres (0.040 ha)
- Built: 1935
- Architect: Carl August Petersen
- Architectural style: English Cottage
- NRHP reference No.: 80000139
- Added to NRHP: January 15, 1980

Freitag's Pure Oil Service Station is an automobile service station styled like an English cottage and built in Monroe, Wisconsin in 1935 by the Pure Oil Company. It was added to the National Register of Historic Places in 1980.

== History ==
Many early gas stations were rough, simple shacks along the road. The Pure Oil Company decided to defy that stereotype with its widespread brand. In the 1920s, their chief engineer Carl August Peterson designed a steep-roofed, brick-walled station in a Tudor Revival style. It had tall chimneys on each end, flower boxes and fancy ironwork, suggesting a picturesque English cottage. The structure featured white brick on the lower half of the building topped by gloss blue Ludowici tile on the roof to represent the company's colors. Pure Oil built hundreds of cottage-style stations like this across the U.S. from 1927 through the 1930s. The standard look suggested predictable quality to the passing motorist, prefiguring today's chain restaurants. The "cottage" styling allowed the station to blend in - even into residential neighborhoods.

Freitag's service station in Monroe is one of these cottage-style stations. Along with the standard office section it has a "lubridome" section, where cars were serviced. This station was built by C. W. (Slim) Freitag, a big band trombonist and pilot. He built it for his father to operate. The original cost for the building and the land was $16,000. After Pure Oil, by then owned by the Union Oil Company of California, merged with Union 76, the service station became affiliated with that brand.
