= Albert and Minna Ten Eyck Round Barn =

- U.S. National Register of Historic Places
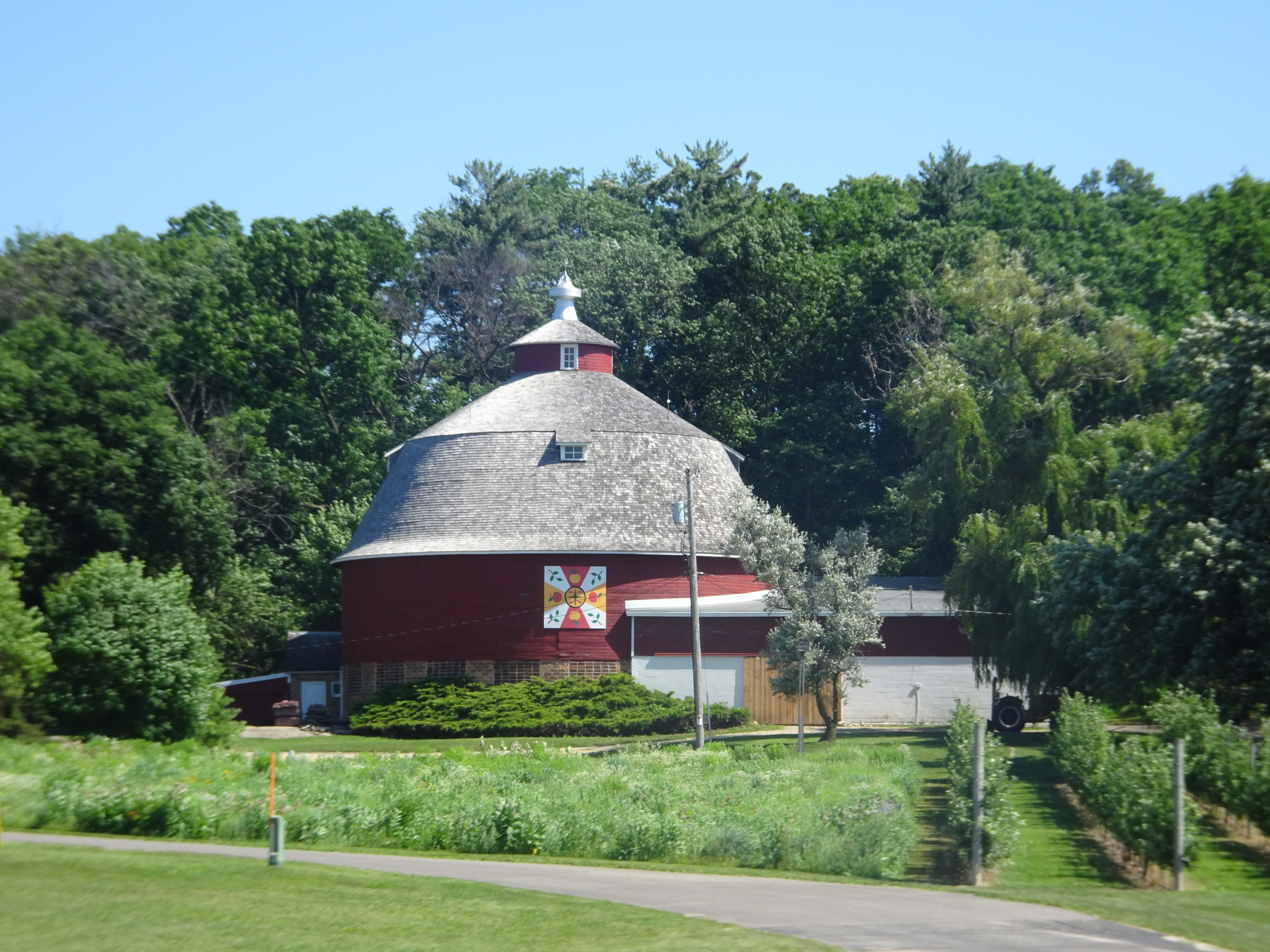
- Albert and Minna Ten Eyck Round Barn
- Location: W968 WI 11; Spring Grove, Wisconsin
- Built: 1922
- NRHP reference No.: 16000813
- Added to NRHP: November 29, 2016

The Albert and Minna Ten Eyck Round Barn is located in Spring Grove, Wisconsin.

== History ==
Albert M. Ten Eyck was a noted agricultural academic and President of the American Society of Agronomy. He and his wife, Minna, took over his family's farm in 1918. The barn was added to the State Register of Historic Places in 2015 and to the National Register of Historic Places the following year.
