= F. F. White Block =

- U.S. National Register of Historic Places
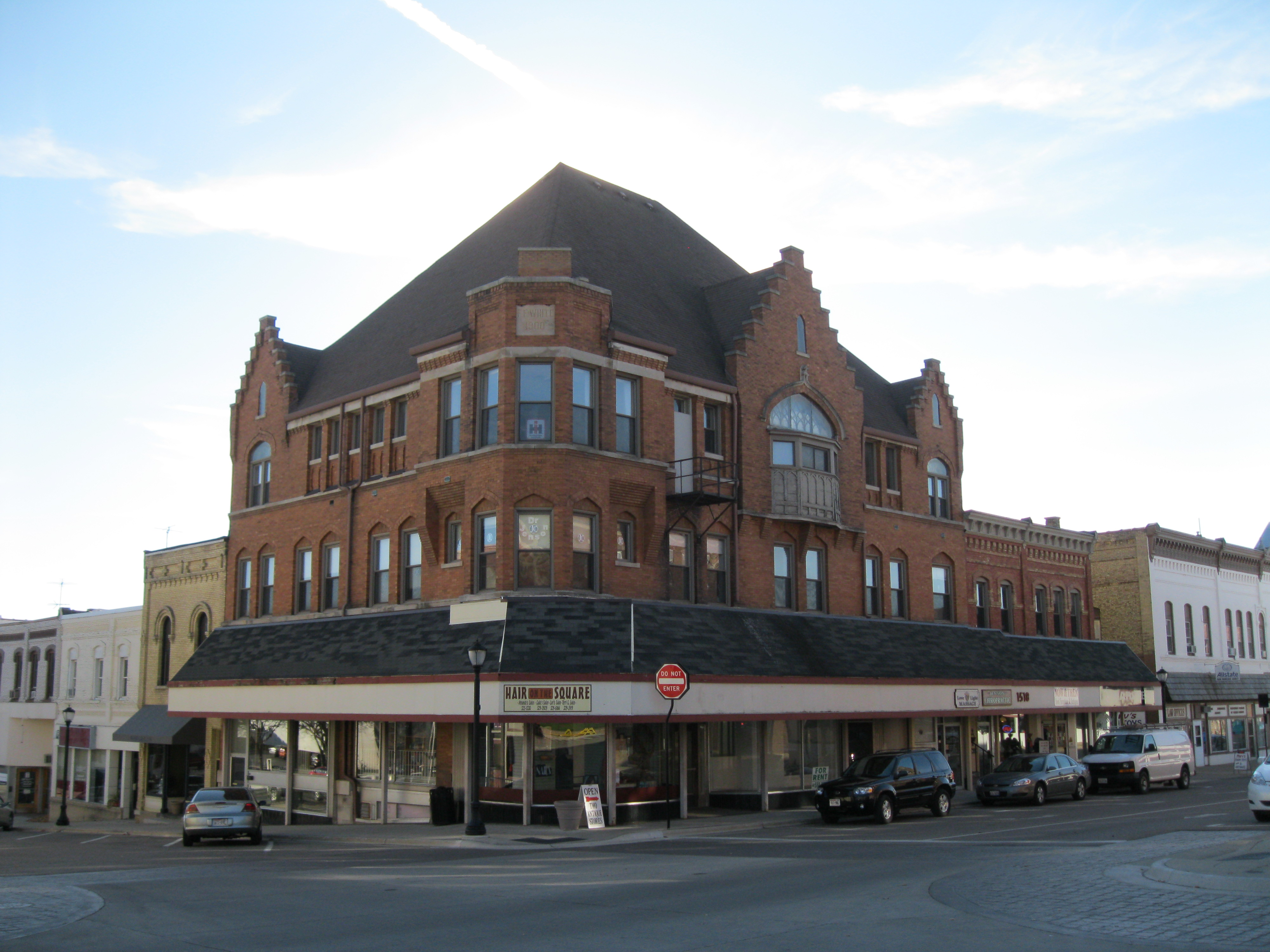

- Location within Wisconsin
- Location: 1514-1524 11th St., Monroe, Wisconsin
- Coordinates: 42°36′03″N 89°38′23″W
- Area: 0.1 acres (0.040 ha)
- Built: 1898–1901
- Architect: A. D. Conover
- Architectural style: Gothic Revival, Tudor Revival
- NRHP reference No.: 79000084
- Added to NRHP: January 31, 1979

The F. F. White Block is a historic commercial building at 1514-1524 11th Street in Monroe, Wisconsin. Businessman and lumber heir F. F. White began construction on the building in 1898; when White died in 1900, his family continued work on the building with the aid of local dentist H. W. Caradine, and it was completed the following year. Architect A. D. Conover designed the three-story building, which incorporates elements of the Gothic Revival and Tudor Revival styles. The building's design includes an octagonal corner tower, an oriel window on the third story above the main entrance, a stone cornice and belt courses, and a steep hip roof with three stepped gables. Once opened, the building housed stores, professional offices, and a local Masonic lodge on the third floor. While large-scale commercial buildings like the F. F. White Block were common in Monroe in the early twentieth century, the block is now the largest commercial building remaining on the city's courthouse square.

The building was added to the National Register of Historic Places on January 31, 1979.

In late 2023, the building received a $249,300 grant to complete a restoration and renovation of the historic building. Since then, the building has received major changes such as a removal of the awnings in favor of a time-correct facade. As of August 2024, work continues on the building. Future developments may include a restaurant with garage door-style windows that can open to the outdoors to participate in community events, and a tower on the top of the building that previously existed on the northwest corner of the building.
