= Janet Jennings House =

Historic house in Wisconsin, United States

- U.S. National Register of Historic Places
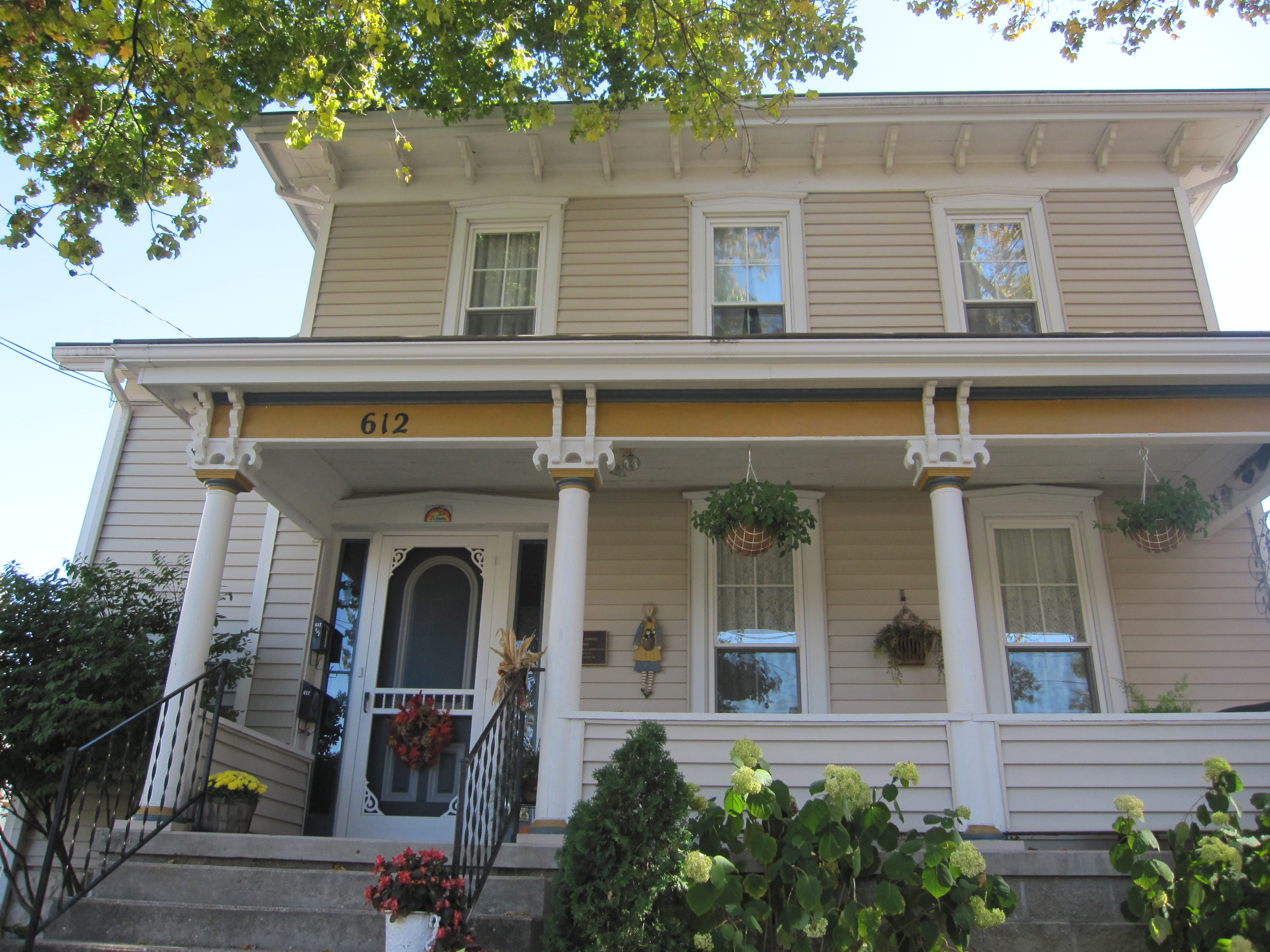
- Janet Jennings House
- Location: 612 22nd Ave., Monroe, Wisconsin
- Coordinates: 42°36′21″N 89°37′56″W
- Area: less than one acre
- Built: 1870
- Architectural style: Italianate/American Foursquare
- NRHP reference No.: 76000065
- Added to NRHP: January 2, 1976

The Janet Jennings House is located in Monroe, Wisconsin.

== History ==
The house built in the early 1870s. Janet Jennings went to Washington in 1863 to care for her brother who was wounded at Chancellorsville. There she worked with Clara Barton, and ended up managing a unit of hospital tents. She later wrote for major newspapers and organized another hospital at Santiago during the Spanish–American War.

The house was listed on the National Register of Historic Places in 1976 and on the State Register of Historic Places in 1989.
