= Southern Six Conference =

Wisconsin high school athletic conference (1928-1941)

The Southern Six Conference is a former high school athletic conference in Wisconsin, consisting of schools in the state's south central region. It was in operation from 1928 to 1941 and all members were part of the Wisconsin Interscholastic Athletic Association.

== History ==
Location of Southern Six Conference Members

The Southern Six Conference, also known as the Southern Wisconsin Six in its early years, was formed in 1928 by six medium-sized high schools in south central Wisconsin: Edgerton, Fort Atkinson, Monroe, Stoughton, Watertown and the University of Wisconsin High School (Wisconsin High). Three conference members (Edgerton, Fort Atkinson and Stoughton) formerly belonged to the Rock River Valley League, Monroe entered the conference from the Southwest Wisconsin Athletic League, and Watertown was previously a member of the Little Ten Conference but left to seek out stronger competition in athletics. The conference lasted for thirteen years before Watertown was forced out by the five other conference members, and the conference was dissolved in 1941. The remaining schools, along with five schools who left the South Central Conference for similar reasons (Baraboo, Portage, Reedsburg, Richland Center and Wisconsin Dells) went on to form the Southern Ten Conference, which competed for eleven years before its dissolution in 1952.

== Conference membership history ==
School	Location	Affiliation	Mascot	Colors	Joined	Left	Conference Joined	Current Conference
Edgerton	Edgerton, WI	Public	Crimson Tide		1928	1941	Southern Ten	Rock Valley
Fort Atkinson	Fort Atkinson, WI	Public	Blackhawks		1928	1941	Southern Ten	Badger
Monroe	Monroe, WI	Public	Cheesemakers		1928	1941	Southern Ten	Rock Valley
Stoughton	Stoughton, WI	Public	Vikings		1928	1941	Southern Ten	Badger
Watertown	Watertown, WI	Public	Goslings		1928	1941	Independent	Badger
Wisconsin High	Madison, WI	Public (University of Wisconsin-Madison)	Badger Preps		1928	1941	Southern Ten	Closed in 1964

== List of state champions ==
=== Fall sports ===
None

=== Winter sports ===
Boys Basketball
School	Year	Division
Wisconsin High	1931	Single Division
Watertown	1939	Class B

=== Spring sports ===
None

== List of conference champions ==
=== Boys Basketball ===
School	Quantity	Years
Wisconsin High	6	1929, 1930, 1931, 1932, 1933, 1934
Stoughton	4	1935, 1937, 1940, 1941
Watertown	3	1930, 1936, 1939
Monroe	2	1930, 1941
Edgerton	1	1932
Fort Atkinson	1	1938

=== Football ===
School	Quantity	Years
Watertown	7	1928, 1931, 1932, 1935, 1937, 1939, 1940
Stoughton	4	1929, 1933, 1937, 1941
Fort Atkinson	2	1934, 1936
Wisconsin High	2	1930, 1938
Edgerton	0	
Monroe	0	
