= Southern Ten Conference =

Wisconsin high school athletic conference (1941-1952)

The Southern Ten Conference is a former high school athletic conference in Wisconsin, comprising schools in the south central part of the state. It was in operation from 1941 to 1952 and all member schools were affiliated with the Wisconsin Interscholastic Athletic Association.

== History ==
Location of Southern Ten Conference Members

The Southern Ten Conference was formed in 1941 by a group of medium-sized high schools in south central Wisconsin after the breakup of two established conferences: the South Central Conference and the Southern Six Conference. Logan High School in La Crosse had recently been voted out of the South Central by a 5-4 margin for reasons of geography and competitive balance. The three schools that voted with Logan to keep them in the conference (Sparta, Tomah and Viroqua) followed them out, and these four schools formed the new Gateway Conference. The five schools that voted for Logan's forced exit from the South Central (Baraboo, Portage, Reedsburg, Richland Center and Wisconsin Dells) joined with five schools from the Southern Six (Edgerton, Fort Atkinson, Monroe, Stoughton and Wisconsin High) in forming the Southern Ten, and competition was set to begin with the 1941-42 basketball season. Watertown, who was removed from the Southern Six prior to the merger for similar reasons to Logan's removal from the South Central, competed as an independent for twelve years until the Braveland Conference was formed in 1953.

The Southern Ten Conference split in 1952 due to the reformation of the South Central Conference by the five schools that originally competed in that conference. The five remaining schools that were originally part of the Southern Six joined with members of the disbanded Rock River Valley League (Evansville, Jefferson, Lake Mills and Milton) and Middleton (formerly of the Madison Suburban Conference) to form the new Badger Conference.

== Conference membership history ==
| School | Location | Affiliation | Mascot | Colors | Joined | Left | Conference Joined | Current Conference |
|---|---|---|---|---|---|---|---|---|
| Baraboo | Baraboo, WI | Public | Thunderbirds | | 1941 | 1952 | South Central | Badger |
| Edgerton | Edgerton, WI | Public | Crimson Tide | | 1941 | 1952 | Badger | Rock Valley |
| Fort Atkinson | Fort Atkinson, WI | Public | Blackhawks | | 1941 | 1952 | Badger | |
| Monroe | Monroe, WI | Public | Cheesemakers | | 1941 | 1952 | Badger | Rock Valley |
| Portage | Portage, WI | Public | Warriors | | 1941 | 1952 | South Central | Badger |
| Reedsburg | Reedsburg, WI | Public | Beavers | | 1941 | 1952 | South Central | Badger |
| Richland Center | Richland Center, WI | Public | Hornets | | 1941 | 1952 | South Central | Southwest Wisconsin |
| Stoughton | Stoughton, WI | Public | Vikings | | 1941 | 1952 | Badger | |
| Wisconsin Dells | Wisconsin Dells, WI | Public | Chiefs | | 1941 | 1952 | South Central | |
| Wisconsin High | Madison, WI | Public (University of Wisconsin-Madison) | Badger Preps | | 1941 | 1952 | Badger | Closed in 1964 |

== List of conference champions ==
=== Boys Basketball ===
| School | Quantity | Years |
|---|---|---|
| Edgerton | 3 | 1943, 1944, 1952 |
| Monroe | 3 | 1943, 1946, 1947 |
| Reedsburg | 3 | 1943, 1948, 1949 |
| Baraboo | 2 | 1945, 1951 |
| Wisconsin High | 2 | 1944, 1945 |
| Portage | 1 | 1943 |
| Stoughton | 1 | 1950 |
| Wisconsin Dells | 1 | 1942 |
| Fort Atkinson | 0 | |
| Richland Center | 0 | |

=== Football ===
| School | Quantity | Years |
|---|---|---|
| Monroe | 3 | 1945, 1946, 1950 |
| Portage | 3 | 1942, 1944, 1945 |
| Baraboo | 2 | 1943, 1948 |
| Edgerton | 2 | 1947, 1948 |
| Wisconsin Dells | 1 | 1951 |
| Wisconsin High | 1 | 1949 |
| Fort Atkinson | 0 | |
| Reedsburg | 0 | |
| Richland Center | 0 | |
| Stoughton | 0 | |
