= South Central Conference (Wisconsin) =

Wisconsin high school athletic conference

The South Central Conference is a high school athletic conference in Wisconsin. Originally founded in 1926, it disbanded in 1941 only to reconstitute eleven years later. All member schools of the South Central Conference are affiliated with the Wisconsin Interscholastic Athletic Association.

== History ==
=== 1926–1941 ===
Location of Final South Central Conference Members (1941)

The South Central Conference was formed in 1926 by seven medium-sized high schools in south central Wisconsin: Baraboo, Portage, Reedsburg, Richland Center, Sparta, Tomah and Viroqua. Logan High School in La Crosse joined two years later, and Wisconsin Dells joined in 1939. The South Central Conference disbanded after the 1941 football season and most of its members went on to form two new conferences. Baraboo, Portage, Reedsburg, Richland Center and Wisconsin Dells went on to form half of the new Southern Ten Conference (along with former Southern Six members Edgerton, Fort Atkinson, Monroe, Stoughton and Wisconsin High). Sparta, Tomah and Viroqua joined with Mauston and Westby to form the new West Central Conference. Sparta, Tomah and Viroqua were also concurrently members of the Gateway Conference along with La Crosse Logan during this time period.

=== 1952–1966 ===
Location of South Central Conference Members (1963-1966)

In 1952, most of the schools that were part of the original incarnation of the South Central Conference joined together and reformed the conference. Baraboo, Portage, Reedsburg, Richland Center and Wisconsin Dells all rejoined from the Southern Ten Conference (with the other five schools forming the nucleus of the new Badger Conference). Sparta, Tomah and Viroqua rejoined from the West Central Conference, along with newcomers Mauston and Nekoosa. In 1963, the conference added two schools to bring membership to twelve: Black River Falls from the Mississippi Valley Conference and Sauk Prairie from the Tri-County League. The conference also subdivided into Northern and Southern sections, an alignment that would last for three seasons:

| Northern Section | Southern Section |
|---|---|
| Black River Falls | Baraboo |
| Mauston | Portage |
| Nekoosa | Reedsburg |
| Sparta | Richland Center |
| Tomah | Sauk Prairie |
| Viroqua | Wisconsin Dells |

=== 1966–2001 ===
Membership of the South Central Conference underwent a few changes after the initial reformation and expansion period. Nekoosa left the conference in 1966 to join the short-lived Vacationland Conference, Viroqua joined the Southwest Wisconsin Activities League in 1969 and Richland Center joined the SWAL two years later. They were replaced by Adams-Friendship, who were left without a conference after the Vacationland disbanded in 1970. After entering the league together fourteen years earlier, Black River Falls and Sauk Prairie exited the South Central in 1977 to join the Coulee Conference and Badger Conference, respectively. Nekoosa rejoined the South Central Conference in 1982, after a four-year stint in the Cloverbelt Conference. Seven years later, Sparta and Tomah left to join with the larger La Crosse-area schools to form the new Mississippi Valley Conference. Membership through the 1990s remained consistent at seven schools, but more significant changes were coming at the turn of the century.

=== 2001–present ===
As the South Central Conference approached the fiftieth anniversary of its reformation, three of its original member schools (Baraboo, Portage and Reedsburg) left to join the Badger Conference as part of a five-school expansion. These three schools had the largest enrollment levels in the South Central Conference and wanted to join a conference more in line with their size. They were replaced by Lodi and Poynette from the Capitol Conference and Westfield from the disbanded Dual County Conference. Lodi and Poynette quickly became disappointed with the longer travel distances between conference opponents and returned to the Capitol Conference five years after their exit. They were replaced by Wautoma, formerly of the East Central Flyway Conference, bringing conference membership to six schools. The South Central Conference expanded to eight schools in 2025 when Berlin and Ripon joined from the East Central Conference after it was realigned out of existence by the WIAA.

=== Football-only alignment ===
In February 2019, in conjunction with the Wisconsin Football Coaches Association, the WIAA released a sweeping football-only realignment for Wisconsin to commence with the 2020 football season and run on a two-year cycle. Previously, the South Central Conference featured two football-only members for the 2019 football season: Black River Falls (a former member from 1963-1977) and Gale-Ettrick-Trempeleau. Both schools were primary members of the Coulee Conference and brough the roster of football members to eight schools. For the 2020-2021 cycle, Black River Falls and G-E-T were moved back to the Coulee Conference, and Nekoosa was moved to the large-schools division of the Central Wisconsin Conference. The outgoing members were replaced with the Montello/Princeton/Green Lake football cooperative of the Trailways Conference and Poynette of the Capitol Conference. This alignment stayed in place for three seasons before the Montello/Princeton/Green Lake football cooperative was dissolved, with Montello and Green Lake/Princeton both moving to eight-man football. For the 2024 season, the South Central Conference welcomed Berlin, Ripon and Waupun (all primary members of the East Central Conference) as new members with the return of Nekoosa after four seasons in the Central Wisconsin Conference. For Berlin and Ripon, this move came a year in advance of both schools joining the South Central Conference as full members. This offset the loss of Poynette to the Eastern Suburban Conference and Westfield to the Trailways Conference as a football-only member.

== List of conference members (1952–present) ==
=== Current full members ===
| School | Location | Affiliaton | Enrollment | Mascot | Colors | Joined |
|---|---|---|---|---|---|---|
| Adams-Friendship | Adams, WI | Public | 417 | Green Devils | | 1971 |
| Berlin | Berlin, WI | Public | 426 | Indians | | 2025 |
| Mauston | Mauston, WI | Public | 427 | Golden Eagles | | 1952 |
| Nekoosa | Nekoosa, WI | Public | 265 | Papermakers | | 1952, 1982 |
| Ripon | Ripon, WI | Public | 422 | Tigers | | 2025 |
| Wautoma | Wautoma, WI | Public | 377 | Hornets | | 2006 |
| Westfield | Westfield, WI | Public | 325 | Pioneers | | 2001 |
| Wisconsin Dells | Wisconsin Dells, WI | Public | 550 | Chiefs | | 1952 |

=== Current associate members ===
| School | Location | Affiliation | Mascot | Colors | Primary Conference | Sport(s) |
|---|---|---|---|---|---|---|
| Amherst | Amherst, WI | Public | Falcons | | Central Wisconsin | Girls Soccer |
| Assumption | Wisconsin Rapids, WI | Private (Catholic) | Royals | | Marawood | Girls Soccer |
| Black River Falls | Black River Falls, WI | Public | Tigers | | Coulee | Boys Soccer |
| Waupun | Waupun, WI | Public | Warriors | | Capitol | Football |

=== Former full members ===
| School | Location | Affiliation | Mascot | Colors | Joined | Left | Conference Joined | Current Conference |
|---|---|---|---|---|---|---|---|---|
| Baraboo | Baraboo, WI | Public | Thunderbirds | | 1952 | 2001 | Badger | |
| Black River Falls | Black River Falls, WI | Public | Tigers | | 1963 | 1977 | Coulee | |
| Lodi | Lodi, WI | Public | Blue Devils | | 2001 | 2006 | Capitol | |
| Portage | Portage, WI | Public | Warriors | | 1952 | 2001 | Badger | |
| Poynette | Poynette, WI | Public | Pumas | | 2001 | 2006 | Capitol | |
| Reedsburg | Reedsburg, WI | Public | Beavers | | 1952 | 2001 | Badger | |
| Richland Center | Richland Center, WI | Public | Hornets | | 1952 | 1971 | SWAL | Southwest Wisconsin |
| Sauk Prairie | Prairie du Sac, WI | Public | Eagles | | 1963 | 1977 | Badger | |
| Sparta | Sparta, WI | Public | Spartans | | 1952 | 1989 | Mississippi Valley | |
| Tomah | Tomah, WI | Public | Timberwovles | | 1952 | 1989 | Mississippi Valley | |
| Viroqua | Viroqua, WI | Public | Blackhawks | | 1952 | 1969 | SWAL | Coulee |

=== Former football-only members ===
| School | Location | Affiliation | Mascot | Colors | Seasons | Primary Conference |
|---|---|---|---|---|---|---|
| Black River Falls | Black River Falls, WI | Public | Tigers | | 2019 | Coulee |
| Gale-Ettrick-Trempealeau | Galesville, WI | Public | Red Hawks | | 2019 | Coulee |
| Montello/ Princeton/ Green Lake | Montello, WI | Public | Phoenix | | 2020-2022 | Cooperative program dissolved, Montello and GLP both transitioned to eight-player football |
| Poynette | Poynette, WI | Public | Pumas | | 2020-2023 | Capitol |
| Berlin | Berlin, WI | Public | Indians | | 2024 | East Central |
| Ripon | Ripon, WI | Public | Tigers | | 2024 | East Central |

== Conference membership history (1926–1941) ==
| School | Location | Affiliation | Mascot | Colors | Joined | Left | Conference Joined | Current Conference |
|---|---|---|---|---|---|---|---|---|
| Baraboo | Baraboo, WI | Public | Thunderbirds | | 1926 | 1941 | Southern Ten | Badger |
| La Crosse Logan | La Crosse, WI | Public | Rangers | | 1928 | 1941 | Independent | Mississippi Valley |
| Portage | Portage, WI | Public | Warriors | | 1926 | 1941 | Southern Ten | Badger |
| Reedsburg | Reedsburg, WI | Public | Beavers | | 1926 | 1941 | Southern Ten | Badger |
| Richland Center | Richland Center, WI | Public | Hornets | | 1926 | 1941 | Southern Ten | Southwest Wisconsin |
| Sparta | Sparta, WI | Public | Spartans | | 1926 | 1941 | West Central | Mississippi Valley |
| Tomah | Tomah, WI | Public | Indians | | 1926 | 1941 | West Central | Mississippi Valley |
| Viroqua | Viroqua, WI | Public | Blackhawks | | 1926 | 1941 | West Central | Coulee |
| Wisconsin Dells | Wisconsin Dells, WI | Public | Chiefs | | 1939 | 1941 | Southern Ten | South Central |

== Membership timeline ==
=== 1952-present ===
==== Full members ====
Northern Section Southern Section

== Membership map ==
South Central Conference
Location of South Central Conference full members:
1 Adams-Friendship
2 Berlin
3 Mauston
4 Nekoosa
5 Ripon
6 Wautoma
7 Westfield
8 Wisconsin Dells

== Sponsored sports ==
| | Baseball | Boys Basketball | Girls Basketball | Boys Cross Country | Girls Cross Country | Football | Boys Golf | Boys Soccer | Girls Soccer | Softball | Boys Track & Field | Girls Track & Field | Girls Volleyball | Boys Wrestling | Girls Wrestling |
|---|---|---|---|---|---|---|---|---|---|---|---|---|---|---|---|
| Adams-Friendship | ● | ● | ● | ● | ● | ● | ● | ● | ● | ● | ● | ● | ● | ● | ● |
| Berlin | ● | ● | ● | ● | ● | ● | ● | ● | ● | ● | ● | ● | ● | ● | ● |
| Mauston | ● | ● | ● | ● | ● | ● | ● | ● | ● | ● | ● | ● | ● | ● (Note: Co-operative with Necedah) | ● |
| Nekoosa | ● | ● | ● | ● | ● | ● | ● | ● | | ● | ● | ● | ● | ● (Note: Co-operative with Port Edwards) | ● |
| Ripon | ● | ● | ● | ● | ● | ● | ● | ● | ● | ● | ● | ● | ● | ● | ● |
| Wautoma | ● | ● | ● | ● (Note: Co-operative with Wild Rose) | ● | ● | ● | ● | ● | ● | ● | ● | ● | ● | ● |
| Westfield | ● | ● | ● | ● | ● | | ● | | | ● | ● | ● | ● | ● | ● |
| Wisconsin Dells | ● | ● | ● | ● | ● | ● | ● | ● | | ● | ● | ● | ● | ● | ● |

== List of state champions ==
=== Fall sports ===
Boys Cross Country
| School | Year | Division |
|---|---|---|
| Sauk Prairie | 1968 | Small Schools |
| Sauk Prairie | 1969 | Small Schools |

Football
| School | Year | Division |
|---|---|---|
| Wautoma | 2008 | Division 4 |

Boys Volleyball
| School | Year | Division |
|---|---|---|
| Portage | 1956 | Single Division |

Girls Volleyball
| School | Year | Division |
|---|---|---|
| Portage | 1981 | Class B |
| Wisconsin Dells | 1984 | Class B |
| Portage | 1987 | Class A |

=== Winter sports ===
Boys Basketball
| School | Year | Division |
|---|---|---|
| Portage | 1982 | Class B |
| Wisconsin Dells | 1987 | Class B |

Girls Basketball
| School | Year | Division |
|---|---|---|
| Portage | 1982 | Class B |

Curling
| School | Year | Division |
|---|---|---|
| Portage | 1960 | Single Division |
| Portage | 1973 | Single Division |

Boys Wrestling
| School | Year | Division |
|---|---|---|
| Reedsburg | 1981 | Class B |
| Reedsburg | 1981 | Class B |
| Lodi | 2004 | Division 2 |

=== Spring sports ===
Baseball
| School | Year | Division |
|---|---|---|
| Nekoosa | 1984 | Class B |
| Nekoosa | 1985 | Class B |
| Wisconsin Dells | 1986 | Class B |

Boys Golf
| School | Year | Division |
|---|---|---|
| Baraboo | 1941 | Single Division |

Softball
| School | Year | Division |
|---|---|---|
| Wisconsin Dells | 1995 | Division 2 |
| Poynette | 2005 | Division 3 |

Boys Track & Field
| School | Year | Division |
|---|---|---|
| Sauk Prairie | 1969 | Class B |
| Baraboo | 1971 | Class A |
| Wisconsin Dells | 1977 | Class B |
| Wisconsin Dells | 1983 | Class B |
| Wautoma | 2009 | Division 2 |

Girls Track & Field
| School | Year | Division |
|---|---|---|
| Reedsburg | 1971 | Single Division |
| Nekoosa | 1990 | Class B |
| Nekoosa | 1992 | Division 2 |
| Nekoosa | 1993 | Division 2 |
| Nekoosa | 1995 | Division 2 |
| Nekoosa | 1998 | Division 2 |

== List of conference champions ==
=== Boys Basketball ===
| School | Quantity | Years |
|---|---|---|
| Wisconsin Dells | 27 | 1956, 1968, 1969, 1985, 1986, 1987, 1988, 1989, 1990, 2002, 2004, 2005, 2006, 2008, 2009, 2010, 2011, 2012, 2013, 2018, 2019, 2020, 2021, 2022, 2023, 2024, 2025 |
| Baraboo | 16 | 1928, 1931, 1932, 1937, 1938, 1956, 1958, 1962, 1963, 1965, 1966, 1967, 1972, 1984, 1994, 1997 |
| Adams-Friendship | 12 | 1979, 1992, 1994, 1995, 1999, 2000, 2001, 2003, 2007, 2008, 2015, 2017 |
| Tomah | 10 | 1929, 1931, 1932, 1934, 1935, 1953, 1954, 1955, 1974, 1975 |
| Portage | 8 | 1927, 1978, 1980, 1982, 1983, 1996, 1997, 1998 |
| Mauston | 7 | 1964, 1969, 1971, 1986, 2015, 2016, 2026 |
| Reedsburg | 7 | 1939, 1957, 1959, 1960, 1991, 1993, 2001 |
| Sparta | 7 | 1961, 1973, 1976, 1977, 1980, 1981, 1983 |
| La Crosse Logan | 3 | 1933, 1939, 1941 |
| Viroqua | 2 | 1936, 1940 |
| Black River Falls | 1 | 1970 |
| Nekoosa | 1 | 2014 |
| Richland Center | 1 | 1930 |
| Wautoma | 1 | 2024 |
| Westfield | 1 | 2025 |
| Berlin | 0 | |
| Lodi | 0 | |
| Poynette | 0 | |
| Ripon | 0 | |
| Sauk Prairie | 0 | |

=== Girls Basketball ===
| School | Quantity | Years |
|---|---|---|
| Portage | 14 | 1976, 1977, 1980, 1981, 1982, 1983, 1984, 1985, 1986, 1988, 1989, 1994, 1995, 1996 |
| Wisconsin Dells | 13 | 1979, 2005, 2008, 2009, 2011, 2016, 2017, 2018, 2019, 2020, 2021, 2025, 2026 |
| Westfield | 6 | 2010, 2021, 2022, 2023, 2024, 2025 |
| Adams-Friendship | 5 | 2002, 2012, 2013, 2014, 2015 |
| Baraboo | 5 | 1993, 1994, 1999, 2000, 2001 |
| Mauston | 4 | 1989, 1990, 1997, 1998 |
| Nekoosa | 3 | 2003, 2004, 2010 |
| Reedsburg | 3 | 1987, 1991, 1992 |
| Lodi | 1 | 2006 |
| Tomah | 1 | 1978 |
| Wautoma | 1 | 2007 |
| Berlin | 0 | |
| Black River Falls | 0 | |
| Poynette | 0 | |
| Ripon | 0 | |
| Sauk Prairie | 0 | |
| Sparta | 0 | |

=== Football ===
| School | Quantity | Years |
|---|---|---|
| Nekoosa | 16 | 1956, 1957, 1982, 1985, 1988, 1990, 1991, 1992, 1993, 1998, 1999, 2009, 2010, 2011, 2012, 2013 |
| Reedsburg | 14 | 1932, 1955, 1959, 1960, 1962, 1963, 1965, 1978, 1980, 1981, 1982, 1983, 1984, 1995 |
| Portage | 13 | 1926, 1927, 1931, 1932, 1933, 1934, 1936, 1938, 1953, 1957, 1966, 1997, 1999 |
| Wisconsin Dells | 13 | 1969, 1972, 1973, 1974, 1976, 1979, 1984, 1985, 1986, 1987, 2007, 2021, 2022 |
| Baraboo | 8 | 1937, 1940, 1961, 1966, 1970, 1971, 1989, 1996 |
| Tomah | 8 | 1930, 1934, 1953, 1954, 1958, 1969, 1977, 1980 |
| Richland Center | 7 | 1928, 1929, 1932, 1935, 1939, 1941, 1952 |
| Wautoma | 7 | 2006, 2007, 2008, 2010, 2014, 2015, 2017 |
| Sparta | 6 | 1926, 1927, 1941, 1967, 1968, 1982 |
| Mauston | 5 | 1992, 1994, 2000, 2018, 2020 |
| Poynette | 4 | 2001, 2003, 2004, 2005 |
| Adams-Friendship | 3 | 2006, 2016, 2023 |
| Berlin | 3 | 2024, 2025, 2026 |
| La Crosse Logan | 3 | 1931, 1932, 1933 |
| Black River Falls | 2 | 1964, 1973 |
| Sauk Prairie | 2 | 1968, 1975 |
| Gale-Ettrick-Trempealeau | 1 | 2019 |
| Lodi | 1 | 2002 |
| Montello/ Princeton/ Green Lake | 0 | |
| Ripon | 0 | |
| Viroqua | 0 | |
| Waupun | 0 | |
| Westfield | 0 | |
