= Badger Conference =

Wisconsin high school athletic conference

The Badger Conference is a high school athletic conference with its membership concentrated in south central Wisconsin. Established in 1952, the Badger Conference is a member of the Wisconsin Interscholastic Athletic Association.

== History ==
=== 1952-1977 ===
Location of Original Badger Conference Members

The Badger Conference was formed in 1952, and most of its members came from two conferences that disbanded the year prior: Edgerton, Fort Atkinson, Monroe, Stoughton and Wisconsin High from the Southern Ten Conference, and Evansville, Jefferson, Lake Mills and Milton from the Rock River Valley League. Middleton, formerly of the Madison Suburban Conference, rounded out the original membership roster at ten schools. Among the other names considered for the new conference were the Capitol Area, Dairyland and Southern Lakeland Conference. Three years after joining the conference, three schools left for the Madison Suburban Conference: Evansville, Lake Mills and Milton. They were replaced by the recently opened Monona Grove High School, who joined the conference in 1956. Sun Prairie moved over from the Madison Suburban Conference in 1963, and University of Wisconsin High was closed the next year, with its students being moved to Madison Central High School. The Badger Conference's membership roster would stay consistent until major realignment in the late 1970s.

=== 1977–2001 ===
In 1977, the Badger Conference underwent a significant realignment. Three schools left the conference: Edgerton and Jefferson for the Rock Valley Conference and Sun Prairie for the Big Eight Conference. They were replaced that same year by Oregon from the Central Suburban Conference and Sauk Prairie from the South Central Conference. Ten years later, DeForest and Waunakee joined from the Capitol Conference. Middleton left to join the Big Eight in 1994, and their place was taken by Verona from the Capitol Conference. Fort Atkinson left for the Southern Lakes Conference in 1997, and Edgewood High School of the Sacred Heart in Madison joined in 1999 after competing independently as a WISAA member for most of their athletic history.

=== 2001–present ===
In 2001, the Badger Conference expanded from nine to fourteen schools, adding three schools formerly in the South Central Conference (Baraboo, Portage and Reedsburg) and two who joined from the Capitol Conference (McFarland and Mount Horeb). In order to accommodate this, the conference split its members into North and South Divisions:

North Division	South Division
Baraboo	Edgewood
DeForest	McFarland
Mount Horeb	Monona Grove
Portage	Monroe
Reedsburg	Oregon
Sauk Prairie	Stoughton
Waunakee	Verona

In 2008, McFarland and Verona left the Badger Conference to join the Rock Valley and Big Eight Conferences, respectively. Their place in the South Division was taken by Fort Atkinson and Milton, who rejoined the Badger Conference from the Southern Lakes Conference. Beaver Dam and Watertown joined from the dissolved Wisconsin Little Ten Conference in 2017 and were placed in separate divisions (Beaver Dam in the North, Watertown in the South). In 2021, the Badger Conference realigned its divisions by East and West for most sports:

East Division	West Division
Beaver Dam	Baraboo
DeForest	Edgewood
Fort Atkinson	Monroe
Milton	Mount Horeb
Monona Grove	Oregon
Stoughton	Portage
Watertown	Reedsburg
Waunakee	Sauk Prairie

This alignment only remained in place for two years, as it was replaced by Large School and Small School divisions in 2023. During this same year, McFarland and Monroe swapped conference affiliations: McFarland rejoined the Badger Conference and Monroe went to the Rock Valley Conference. Monroe's departure left Stoughton as the only school to have been a member of the conference for its entire history. In March 2026, the WIAA's Board of Control approved a request by Portage to leave the Badger Conference's Small School division to join the Capitol Conference for the 2027-28 school year, a move that will decrease Badger Conference membership to fifteen schools.

=== Football-only alignment ===
In February 2019, in conjunction with the Wisconsin Football Coaches Association, the WIAA released a sweeping football-only realignment for Wisconsin to commence with the 2020 football season and run on a two-year cycle. The Badger Conference remained at sixteen schools and adopted the large/small school divisional alignment three years before doing so for all sports, but with some changes to membership. Janesville Craig and Janesville Parker moved over as football-only members from the Big Eight Conference and were placed in the large-school division, with Edgewood and Monroe moving over to the Rock Valley Conference. The two Janesville schools returned to the Big Eight Conference for the 2022 football season, exchanging affiliations with Sun Prairie East and Sun Prairie West. Baraboo and Reedsburg moved over to the Mississippi Valley Conference and DeForest took their place in the small-schools division to give the Badger Conference fourteen members in two seven-team divisions for football. In 2024, Edgewood made their return to the Badger Conference as a football member, joining from the Capitol Conference along with Lakeside Lutheran in Lake Mills. They replaced Beaver Dam and Watertown, who left to join the East Central Conference as football-only members. Three schools moved over from the small-school division (DeForest, Fort Atkinson and Monona Grove) to give the large-school division eight members and the small-school division (who play an interlocking schedule with the East Central Conference) six members. The Badger Conference will be expanding to sixteen football members for the 2026-2027 cycle, welcoming back Beaver Dam and Watertown from the shuttered East Central Conference. Additionally, McFarland and Monroe will be rejoining from the Rock Valley Conference, replacing Lakeside Lutheran and Portage after their reshuffling to the Capitol Conference.

== List of member schools ==
=== Current full members ===
School	Location	Affiliation	Enrollment	Mascot	Colors	Joined	Division
Baraboo	Baraboo, WI	Public	879	Thunderbirds		2001	Small
Beaver Dam	Beaver Dam, WI	Public	991	Golden Beavers		2017	Large
DeForest	DeForest, WI	Public	1,197	Norskies		1987	Large
Edgewood	Madison, WI	Private, Catholic (Dominican)	598	Crusaders		1999	Small
Fort Atkinson (Note: Left the Badger Conference in 1997, returned in 2008)	Fort Atkinson, WI	Public	778	Blackhawks		1952, 2008	Large
McFarland (Note: Left the Badger Conference in 2008, returned in 2023)	McFarland, WI	Public	705	Spartans		2001, 2023	Small
Milton (Note: Left the Badger Conference in 1955, returned in 2008)	Milton, WI	Public	1,052	Red Hawks		1952, 2008	Large
Monona Grove	Monona, WI	Public	1,152	Silver Eagles		1956	Large
Mount Horeb	Mount Horeb, WI	Public	730	Vikings		2001	Small
Oregon	Oregon, WI	Public	1,339	Panthers		1977	Large
Portage (Note: Joining the Capitol Conference for the 2027-28 school year)	Portage, WI	Public	624	Warriors		2001	Small
Reedsburg	Reedsburg, WI	Public	848	Beavers		2001	Small
Sauk Prairie	Prairie du Sac, WI	Public	819	Eagles		1977	Small
Stoughton	Stoughton, WI	Public	806	Vikings		1952	Small
Watertown	Watertown, WI	Public	1,132	Goslings		2017	Large
Waunakee	Waunakee, WI	Public	1,373	Warriors		1987	Large

=== Current associate members ===
School	Location	Affiliation	Mascot	Colors	Primary Conference	Sport(s)
Lodi	Lodi, WI	Public	Blue Devils		Capitol	Girls Swimming (Note: Co-operative with River Valley and Wisconsin Heights)
Middleton	Middleton, WI	Public	Cardinals		Big Eight	Girls Lacrosse
Monroe	Monroe, WI	Public	Cheesemakers		Rock Valley	Football, Boys Hockey, (Note: Co-operative with Dakota (IL), Lena-Winslow (IL), Monticello, New Glarus and Warren (IL)) Girls Swimming (Note: Co-operative with New Glarus)
Sun Prairie East	Sun Prairie, WI	Public	Cardinals		Big Eight	Football
Sun Prairie West	Sun Prairie, WI	Public	Wolves		Big Eight	Football
Verona	Verona, WI	Public	Wildcats		Big Eight	Girls Lacrosse
Viroqua	Viroqua, WI	Public	Blackhawks		Coulee	Girls Hockey (Note: Co-operative with Cashton. Westby and Youth Initiative)
Wayland Academy	Beaver Dam, WI	Private (Nonsectarian)	Big Red		Trailways	Boys Lacrosse

=== Current co-operative members ===
Team	Colors	Host School	Co-operative Members	Sport(s)
Badger Lightning		Sauk Prairie	Baraboo, Mauston, Portage, Reedsburg, Wisconsin Dells	Girls Hockey
Cap City Cougars		Sun Prairie West	DeForest, Madison East, Madison La Follette, Sun Prairie East, Waunakee	Girls Hockey
Janesville Bluebirds		Janesville Parker	Beloit Memorial, Belvidere (IL), Brodhead, Clinton, Edgerton, Hononegah (IL), Janesville Craig, Milton, Monroe, The Lincoln Academy, Turner	Girls Hockey
Janesville Phoenix		Janesville Craig	Janesville Parker, Fort Atkinson, Milton	Boys Lacrosse, Girls Lacrosse
Madison Knights		Edgewood	Madison East, Madison La Follette, Madison West, Monona Grove, Vel Phillips Memorial	Girls Lacrosse
Metro Lynx		Middleton	Edgewood, Madison West, Mount Horeb, Vel Phillips Memorial, Verona	Girls Hockey
South Central Navigators		DeForest	Lake Mills, Lodi, Madison Country Day, Madison East, Madison La Follette, Pardeeville, Poynette	Boys Hockey
Stoughton Icebergs		Stoughton	Cambridge, Evansville, Lodi, McFarland, Monona Grove, Oregon, Poynette	Girls Hockey
Sun Prairie United		Sun Prairie East	Sun Prairie West	Girls Lacrosse

=== Former full members ===
Institution	Location	Affiliation	Mascot	Colors	Joined	Left	Conference Joined	Current Conference
Edgerton	Edgerton, WI	Public	Crimson Tide		1952	1977	Rock Valley	
Evansville	Evansville, WI	Public	Blue Devils		1952	1955	Madison Suburban	Rock Valley
Jefferson	Jefferson, WI	Public	Eagles		1952	1977	Rock Valley	Capitol
Lake Mills	Lake Mills, WI	Public	L-Cats		1952	1955	Madison Suburban	Capitol
Middleton	Middleton, WI	Public	Cardinals		1952	1994	Big Eight	
Monroe	Monroe, WI	Public	Cheesemakers		1952	2023	Rock Valley	
Wisconsin High	Madison, WI	University of Wisconsin-Madison	Badger Preps		1952	1964	Closed (folded into Madison Central)	
Sun Prairie (Note: Currently known as Sun Prairie East High School)	Sun Prairie, WI	Public	Cardinals		1963	1977	Big Eight	
Verona	Verona, WI	Public	Wildcats		1994	2008	Big Eight	

=== Former football-only members ===
School	Location	Affiliation	Mascot	Colors	Seasons	Conference Joined	Primary Conference
Janesville Craig	Janesville, WI	Public	Cougars		2020-2021	Big Eight	Big Eight
Janesville Parker	Janesville, WI	Public	Vikings		2020-2021	Big Eight	Big Eight
Lakeside Lutheran	Lake Mills, WI	Private (WELS)	Warriors		2024-2025	Capitol	Capitol

== Membership timeline ==
=== Full members ===
North Division South Division East Division West Division Large Schools Small Schools

=== Football members ===
North Division South Division Large Schools Small Schools

== Membership map ==
Badger Conference
Location of Badger Conference full members:
1 Baraboo
2 Beaver Dam
3 DeForest
4 Edgewood
5 Fort Atkinson
6 McFarland
7 Milton
8 Monona Grove
9 Mount Horeb
10 Oregon
11 Portage
12 Reedsburg
13 Sauk Prairie
14 Stoughton
15 Watertown
16 Waunakee

== Sponsored sports ==
School	Baseball	Boys Basketball	Girls Basketball	Boys Cross Country	Girls Cross Country	Football	Boys Golf	Girls Golf	Gymnastics	Boys Hockey	Girls Hockey	Boys Lacrosse	Girls Lacrosse	Boys Soccer	Girls Soccer	Softball	Boys Swim & Dive	Girls Swim & Dive	Boys Tennis	Girls Tennis	Boys Track & Field	Girls Track & Field	Girls Volleyball	Boys Wrestling	Girls Wrestling
Baraboo	●	●	●	●	●		●	●	●	● (Note: Co-operative with Portage)				●	●	●	●	●	●	●	●	●	●	●	●
Beaver Dam	●	●	●	●	●	●	●	●		● (Note: Co-operative with Columbus, Horicon, Mayville, Randolph and Waterloo)	● (Note: Co-operative with Columbus, Dodgeland, Fall River, Horicon, Lomira, Mayville and Randolph)			●	●	●	● (Note: Co-operative with Columbus and Horicon)	● (Note: Co-operative with Columbus, Horicon, Randolph, Waupun and Wayland Academy)	●	●	●	●	●	●	●
DeForest	●	●	●	●	●	●	●	●		● (Note: South Central Navigators co-operative)		●	● (Note: Co-operative with Sauk Prairie and Wisconsin Heights)	●	●	●	●	●	●	●	●	●	●	●	●
Edgewood	●	●	●	●	●	●	●	●		●		● (Note: Co-operative with Monona Grove)	● (Note: Madison Knights co-operative)	●	●	● (Note: Co-operative with St. Ambrose Academy)	●	●	●	●	●	●	●		
Fort Atkinson	●	●	●	●	●	●	●	●						●	●	●	●	●	●	● (Note: Co-operative with Cambridge)	●	●	●	●	●
McFarland	●	●	●	●	●	●	●	●		●				●	●	●	●	●	●	●	●	●	●		
Milton	●	●	●	●	●	●	●	●	● (Note: Co-operative with Edgerton)	● (Note: Co-operative with Big Foot, Edgerton, Elkhorn, Evansville, Fort Atkinson, Whitewater and Williams Bay)				●	●	●	●	●	●	●	●	●	●	●	●
Monona Grove	●	●	●	●	●	●	●	●	●	●				●	●	●	●	●	●	●	●	●	●	● (Note: Co-operative with McFarland)	●
Mount Horeb	●	●	●	●	●	● (Note: Co-operative with Barneveld)	●	●	●					●	●	●	●	●			●	●	●	●	●
Oregon	●	●	●	●	●	●	●	●		●		● (Note: Co-operative with Brodhead, Evansville, McFarland and Stoughton)	●	●	●	●	●	●	●	●	●	●	●	●	●
Portage	●	●	●	●	●		●	●						● (Note: Co-operative with Poynette)	●	●		●	●	●	●	●	●	●	●
Reedsburg	●	●	●	●	●		●	●	●	● (Note: Co-operative with Mauston and Wisconsin Dells)				●	●	●			●	●	●	●	●	●	●
Sauk Prairie	●	●	●	●	●	●	●		●	● (Note: Co-operative with Wisconsin Heights)	● (Note: Badger Lightning co-operative)	● (Note: Co-operative with Baraboo, Lodi and Wisconsin Heights)		●	●	●	●	●	●	●	●	●	●	●	●
Stoughton	●	●	●	●	●	●	●	●		● (Note: Co-operative with Barneveld, Lakeside Lutheran, Luther Prep and Mount Horeb)	● (Note: Stoughton Icebergs co-operative)			●	●	●	●	●	●	●	●	●	●	●	●
Watertown	●	●	●	●	●	●	●	●	●			●	●	●	●	●	●	●	●	●	●	●	●	●	●
Waunakee	●	●	●	●	●	●	●	●	● (Note: Co-operative with DeForest)	●		●	●	●	●	●	●	●	●	●	●	●	●	●	●

== List of state champions ==
Boys Cross Country
School	Year	Division
Monona Grove	1959	Medium Schools
Monroe	1973	Medium Schools
Monroe	1974	Class A
Monroe	1979	Class A
Oregon	1988	Class A
Middleton	1992	Division 1
McFarland	2002	Division 2
Edgewood	2013	Division 2

Girls Cross Country
School	Year	Division
Mount Horeb/ Barneveld	2008	Division 2

Football
School	Year	Division
Monona Grove	1977	Division 2
Middleton	1983	Division 2
Monona Grove	1984	Division 3
Monroe	1986	Division 2
Middleton	1987	Division 2
Monroe	1990	Division 2
Monroe	1991	Division 2
Monroe	1992	Division 2
Monroe	1994	Division 3
Waunakee	1999	Division 3
Waunakee	2002	Division 3
Reedsburg	2009	Division 3
Waunakee	2009	Division 2
Waunakee	2010	Division 2
Waunakee	2011	Division 2
Monona Grove	2013	Division 3
Waunakee	2017	Division 2
DeForest	2019	Division 3
Waunakee	2021	Division 2
Monroe	2022	Division 3

Girls Golf
School	Year	Division
Edgewood	2001	Single Division
Edgewood	2002	Single Division
Edgewood	2003	Division 2
Edgewood	2004	Division 2
Edgewood	2005	Division 2
Edgewood	2006	Division 2
Edgewood	2007	Division 2
Edgewood	2008	Division 2
Edgewood	2009	Division 2
Edgewood	2011	Division 2
Edgewood	2012	Division 2
Edgewood	2013	Division 2
Edgewood	2014	Division 2
Edgewood	2018	Division 2
Edgewood	2019	Division 2

Boys Soccer
School	Year	Division
Sauk Prairie	1996	Division 2
Oregon	1998	Division 2
Mount Horeb	2011	Division 2
Oregon	2013	Division 2
Mount Horeb	2015	Division 3
Mount Horeb	2017	Division 3
Oregon	2018	Division 2
Oregon	2021	Division 2
Oregon	2022	Division 2

Girls Swimming & Diving
School	Year	Division
Verona	1998	Division 2
Sauk Prairie	2002	Division 2
DeForest	2006	Division 2
DeForest	2007	Division 2
DeForest	2008	Division 2
Milton	2010	Division 2
Milton	2011	Division 2
Edgewood	2015	Division 2
Edgewood	2016	Division 2
Edgewood	2017	Division 2
Edgewood	2018	Division 2
Edgewood	2019	Division 2
Edgewood	2020-21	Alternate Season
Edgewood	2021	Division 2
Edgewood	2022	Division 2

Girls Tennis
School	Year	Division
Edgewood	2013	Division 2
Edgewood	2015	Division 2
Edgewood	2016	Division 2

Boys Volleyball
School	Year	Division
Wisconsin High	1954	Single Division
Wisconsin High	1962	Single Division
Wisconsin High	1963	Single Division
Monona Grove	1965	Single Division

=== Winter sports ===
Boys Basketball
School	Year	Division
Monroe	1965	Single Division
Edgewood	2002	Division 2
Monroe	2007	Division 2
Mount Horeb	2015	Division 2

Girls Basketball
School	Year	Division
Monroe	1989	Class A
Waunakee	1993	Division 2
Monroe	2006	Division 2
Monroe	2008	Division 2
Edgewood	2017	Division 3
Beaver Dam	2017	Division 2
Beaver Dam	2018	Division 2
Beaver Dam	2019	Division 2
Edgewood	2024	Division 3

Girls Gymnastics
School	Year	Division
Mount Horeb	2015	Division 2
Mount Horeb	2020	Division 2

Boys Hockey
School	Year	Division
Edgewood	2026	Division 1

Boys Swimming & Diving
School	Year	Division
Verona	2000	Division 2
McFarland	2007	Division 2
McFarland	2008	Division 2
Monona Grove	2013	Division 2
Edgewood	2014	Division 2
Monona Grove	2015	Division 2
Monona Grove	2016	Division 2
Monona Grove	2017	Division 2
Monona Grove	2018	Division 2
Edgewood	2019	Division 2
Edgewood	2020	Division 2
Edgewood	2022	Division 2

Boys Wrestling
School	Year	Division
Stoughton	1968	Single Division
Stoughton	1972	Single Division
Monroe	1973	Single Division
Stoughton	1975	Single Division
Stoughton	1976	Single Division
Stoughton	1977	Single Division
Stoughton	1987	Class A
Stoughton	1988	Class A
Stoughton	2018	Division 1
Stoughton	2019	Division 1
Stoughton	2020	Division 1

Girls Wrestling
School	Year
Milton	2025
Milton	2026

=== Spring sports ===
Baseball
School	Year	Division
Sun Prairie	1974	Single Division
Sauk Prairie	1996	Division 2
Edgewood	2004	Division 2
Portage	2006	Division 2
Edgewood	2009	Division 2
Portage	2012	Division 2
Waunakee	2018	Division 1
Milton	2022	Division 1
Edgewood	2024	Division 2

Boys Golf
School	Year	Division
Wisconsin High	1955	Single Division
Monona Grove	1989	Class B
Middleton	1993	Division 1
McFarland	2004	Division 2
Edgewood	2009	Division 2
Edgewood	2010	Division 2
Edgewood	2017	Division 2
Edgewood	2018	Division 2
Edgewood	2019	Division 2
Edgewood	2021	Division 2
Edgewood	2022	Division 2
Edgewood	2023	Division 2

Girls Soccer
School	Year	Division
Monona Grove	2001	Division 2
Monona Grove	2002	Division 2
Monona Grove	2003	Division 2
Edgewood	2009	Division 2
Edgewood	2009	Division 2
Oregon	2015	Division 2
Oregon	2019	Division 2
Oregon	2022	Division 2
Oregon	2024	Division 2
McFarland	2026	Division 3

Softball
School	Year	Division
Middleton	1989	Class A
Monroe	2003	Division 2
Portage	2005	Division 2

Boys Tennis
School	Year	Division
Monroe	1996	Division 2
Sauk Prairie	2001	Division 2
Sauk Prairie	2003	Division 2
Edgewood	2016	Division 2
Edgewood	2018	Division 2

Boys Track & Field
School	Year	Division
Monroe	1966	Class B
Monona Grove	1982	Class A
Monona Grove	1984	Class B
Monona Grove	1985	Class B
Sauk Prairie	1999	Division 2
Verona	1999	Division 1
Monroe	2014	Division 2

Girls Track & Field
School	Year	Division
Sauk Prairie	1996	Division 2
Edgewood	2002	Division 2
DeForest	2023	Division 1

== List of conference champions ==
=== Boys Basketball ===
School	Quantity	Years
Waunakee	16	1992, 2007, 2008, 2009, 2010, 2011, 2012, 2013, 2016, 2017, 2018, 2020, 2023, 2024, 2025
Monroe	15	1955, 1959, 1960, 1963, 1964, 1965, 1967, 1998, 2005, 2007, 2008, 2009, 2010, 2011, 2022
Stoughton	15	1956, 1963, 1969, 1981, 1982, 1999, 2000, 2012, 2013, 2014, 2015, 2016, 2017, 2020, 2024
Fort Atkinson	11	1957, 1958, 1973, 1977, 1978, 1983, 1985, 1987, 1988, 1993, 2025
Monona Grove	11	1962, 1966, 1979, 1980, 1989, 1990, 1994, 1995, 2013, 2018, 2019
Sun Prairie	8	1968, 1969, 1970, 1971, 1972, 1974, 1975, 1976
Oregon	7	1986, 1989, 1991, 1993, 2000, 2003, 2004
Sauk Prairie	6	1996, 1997, 2001, 2002, 2006, 2023
Edgewood	4	2003, 2004, 2009, 2017
Mount Horeb	4	2014, 2015, 2019, 2025
Portage	4	2002, 2003, 2004, 2007
Wisconsin High	3	1953, 1954, 1961
Middleton	2	1984, 1988
Beaver Dam	1	2026
DeForest	1	2022
Edgerton	1	1953
McFarland	1	2002
Verona	1	2006
Baraboo	0	
Evansville	0	
Jefferson	0	
Lake Mills	0	
Milton	0	
Reedsburg	0	
Watertown	0	

=== Girls Basketball ===
School	Quantity	Years
Monroe	20	1980, 1986, 1988, 1989, 1991, 1994, 1995, 1996, 1999, 2000, 2003, 2004, 2005, 2006, 2007, 2008, 2009, 2010, 2017, 2018
Monona Grove	12	1976, 1984, 1985, 1986, 1987, 1988, 1990, 1992, 2012, 2013, 2014, 2019
Waunakee	12	1993, 1999, 2000, 2001, 2007, 2008, 2010, 2012, 2016, 2017, 2025, 2026
DeForest	11	1991, 2002, 2003, 2004, 2005, 2006, 2007, 2009, 2014, 2015, 2016
Oregon	9	1978, 1979, 1981, 1982, 1983, 2015, 2020, 2023, 2024
Edgewood	6	2006, 2009, 2015, 2017, 2025, 2026
Stoughton	6	1977, 1997, 1998, 2002, 2016, 2017
Beaver Dam	5	2018, 2019, 2020, 2022, 2023
Baraboo	2	2011, 2013
Middleton	2	1975, 1991
Reedsburg	2	2005, 2022
Sauk Prairie	2	2009, 2010
McFarland	1	2024
Milton	1	2011
Sun Prairie	1	1976
Edgerton	0	
Fort Atkinson	0	
Jefferson	0	
Mount Horeb	0	
Portage	0	
Verona	0	
Watertown	0	

=== Football ===
School	Quantity	Years
Monona Grove	28	1958, 1962, 1964, 1965, 1966, 1969, 1970, 1971, 1972, 1975, 1977, 1980, 1981, 1982, 1984, 2001, 2003, 2004, 2005, 2009, 2010, 2011, 2012, 2013, 2014, 2015, 2017, 2018
Waunakee	24	1998, 1999, 2000, 2001, 2003, 2004, 2005, 2006, 2007, 2008, 2009, 2010, 2011, 2012, 2015, 2016, 2017, 2018, 2021, 2022, 2023, 2024, 2025, 2026
Monroe	13	1986, 1987, 1989, 1990, 1991, 1992, 1993, 1994, 1995, 1996, 1997, 1998, 2016
Middleton	12	1953, 1955, 1959, 1966, 1967, 1968, 1970, 1971, 1972, 1974, 1983, 1988
Mount Horeb/ Barneveld	7	2002, 2014, 2021, 2022, 2023, 2024, 2025
Stoughton	6	1952, 1960, 1961, 1963, 1975, 2019
Fort Atkinson	5	1956, 1957, 1964, 1976, 2021
Oregon	5	1978, 1979, 1980, 1985, 1990
DeForest	4	1996, 2009, 2014, 2019
Jefferson	4	1954, 1964, 1974, 1975
(Sun Prairie) East	4	1964, 1966, 1973, 1975
Verona	4	2002, 2005, 2006, 2008
Edgewood	3	1999, 2005, 2025
Milton	3	2014, 2015, 2019
Reedsburg	2	2009, 2013
Sauk Prairie	2	1981, 2025
Beaver Dam	1	2026
Baraboo	0	
Edgerton	0	
Evansville	0	
Janesville Craig	0	
Janesville Parker	0	
Lake Mills	0	
Lakeside Lutheran	0	
McFarland	0	
Portage	0	
Sun Prairie West	0	
Watertown	0	
Wisconsin High	0	

=== Boys Hockey ===
School	Quantity	Years
Edgewood	20	2000, 2001, 2006, 2007, 2009, 2011, 2012, 2013, 2014, 2015, 2016, 2017, 2018, 2019, 2020, 2022, 2023, 2024, 2025, 2026
Waunakee	7	2010, 2012, 2014, 2017, 2020, 2022, 2023
Reedsburg/ Wisconsin Dells	5	2011, 2015, 2016, 2018, 2019
Stoughton	5	2003, 2004, 2008, 2009, 2010
Reedsburg	3	2003, 2004, 2005
DeForest	2	2006, 2008
Baraboo/ Reedsburg	2	2007, 2009
Beaver Dam	2	2023, 2024
Sauk Prairie	2	2005, 2013
Verona	2	2002, 2005
Baraboo/ Portage	1	2014
Monona Grove	1	2014
Oregon	1	2024
Baraboo	0	
McFarland	0	
McFarland/ Oregon	0	
Milton	0	
Monroe	0	
South Central Navigators	0	
Waunakee/ DeForest	0	
Wisconsin Dells/ Mauston	0	
