= Rock River Valley League =

Wisconsin high school athletic conference (1922-1952)

The Rock River Valley League is a former high school athletic conference with its membership concentrated in south central Wisconsin. Competing from 1922 to 1952, all conference members were affiliated with the Wisconsin Interscholastic Athletic Association.

== History ==
Location of Original Rock River Valley League Members

The Rock River Valley League was formed in 1922 by eight medium-sized high schools near the Rock River in south central Wisconsin: Cambridge, Edgerton, Fort Atkinson, Jefferson, Lake Mills, Milton, Stoughton and Whitewater. Member schools were located in Dane, Jefferson, Rock and Walworth Counties. The league would grow to nine schools in 1925 with the addition of Evansville to the loop. Cambridge would leave the conference in 1927 after one season of dual membership with the Madison Suburban Conference. In 1928, the Rock River Valley Conference lost three schools (Edgerton, Fort Atkinson and Stoughton) to the newly formed Southern Six Conference. The league continued with five schools until Brodhead, who had recently left the smaller State Line League, joined in 1932. Whitewater left the Rock River Valley League in 1937 to join the Southern Five Conference. They were replaced by their crosstown rivals, College High School. In 1944, Brodhead left the conference to rejoin the State Line League. They were replaced by the "B" team from Janesville High School, whose varsity program belonged to the larger Big Eight Conference. College High left the conference in 1945 to join the Southern Regional Conference, leaving membership at five schools for the remainder of the conference's history. The Rock River Valley League was folded in 1952 when the four varsity members (Evansville, Jefferson, Lake Mills and Milton) would join with five former Southern Ten Conference schools (Edgerton, Fort Atkinson, Monroe, Stoughton and Wisconsin High) and Middleton (formerly of the Madison Suburban Conference) to form the new Badger Conference.

== Conference membership history ==
=== Final members ===
School	Location	Affiliation	Mascot	Colors	Joined	Left	Conference Joined	Current Conference
Evansville	Evansville, WI	Public	Blue Devils		1925	1952	Badger	Rock Valley
Janesville "B"	Janesville, WI	Public	Bluebirds		1944	1952	Big Eight	Split into Craig and Parker
Jefferson	Jefferson, WI	Public	Eagles		1922	1952	Badger	Rock Valley
Lake Mills	Lake Mills, WI	Public	L-Cats		1922	1952	Badger	Capitol
Milton	Milton, WI	Public	Redmen		1922	1952	Badger	

=== Previous members ===
School	Location	Affiliation	Mascot	Colors	Joined	Left	Conference Joined	Current Conference
Brodhead	Brodhead, WI	Public	Cardinals		1932	1944	State Line	Rock Valley
Cambridge	Cambridge, WI	Public	Bluejays		1922	1927	Madison Suburban	Capitol
College High	Whitewater, WI	Public	Preps		1937	1945	Southern Regional	Closed in 1959
Edgerton	Edgerton, WI	Public	Crimson Tide		1922	1928	Southern Six	Rock Valley
Fort Atkinson	Fort Atkinson, WI	Public	Blackhawks		1922	1928	Southern Six	Badger
Stoughton	Stoughton, WI	Public	Vikings		1922	1928	Southern Six	Badger
Whitewater	Whitewater, WI	Public	Quakers		1922	1937	Southern Five	Rock Valley

== List of state champions ==
=== Fall sports ===
None

=== Winter sports ===
None

=== Spring sports ===
Boys Track & Field
School	Year	Division
Fort Atkinson	1927	Class B
Fort Atkinson	1928	Class B

== List of conference champions ==
=== Boys Basketball ===
School	Quantity	Years
Lake Mills	14	1931, 1936, 1937, 1939, 1940, 1941, 1943, 1944, 1945, 1946, 1947, 1948, 1949, 1950
Evansville	6	1930, 1932, 1934, 1938, 1951, 1952
Milton	4	1927, 1933, 1935, 1952
Whitewater College	3	1939, 1941, 1942
Jefferson	2	1931, 1943
Edgerton	1	1928
Stoughton	1	1926
Whitewater	1	1929
Brodhead	0	
Cambridge	0	
Fort Atkinson	0	
Janesville "B"	0	

=== Football ===
School	Quantity	Years
Lake Mills	14	1928, 1929, 1930, 1931, 1933, 1936, 1937, 1938, 1940, 1941, 1945, 1946, 1948, 1949
Jefferson	7	1928, 1935, 1939, 1941, 1942, 1943, 1946
Milton	7	1932, 1934, 1941, 1944, 1947, 1950, 1951
Fort Atkinson	2	1925, 1926
Edgerton	1	1927
Evansville	1	1950
Brodhead	0	
Cambridge	0	
Janesville "B"	0	
Stoughton	0	
Whitewater	0	
Whitewater College	0	
