= Oregon High School =

Oregon High School may refer to:

- Oregon High School (Illinois), Oregon, Illinois
- Oregon High School (Missouri), Oregon, Missouri
- Oregon High School (Wisconsin), Oregon, Wisconsin
