= Mount Horeb Area School District =

School district in Wisconsin, United States

Address
- 1304 East Lincoln Street Mount Horeb, Wisconsin, 53572; United States
- Coordinates: 43°0′27.2″N 89°43′21.6″W

District information
- Type: Regular local school district
- Grades: PreK–12
- Superintendent: Steve Salerno
- Schools: 6
- NCES District ID: 5509990

Students and staff
- Students: 2,298 (2024–25)
- Teachers: 168.17 (on an FTE basis)
- Staff: 319.16
- Student–teacher ratio: 13.66
- District mascot: Vikings

Other information
- Website: www.mounthorebschools.org

The Mount Horeb Area School District is a school district based in Mount Horeb, and serves the communities of Mount Horeb and Blue Mounds.

The district administers 5 schools, 2 elementary schools, one intermediate school, one middle school, and one high school. It has an enrollment of 2,298 students in the 2024–2025 school year.

== Schools ==
=== Secondary ===
- Mount Horeb High School
- Mount Horeb Middle School

=== Intermediate ===
- Mount Horeb Intermediate Center

=== Elementary ===
- Mount Horeb Primary Center
- Mount Horeb Early Learning Center
