= Oregon School District =

School district in Wisconsin, United States

Address
- 123 E. Grove St Oregon, WI, 53575; United States

District information
- Grades: PK–12
- Schools: 8
- NCES District ID: 5511100

Students and staff
- Students: 4,186 (2024–25)
- Teachers: 327.19 (on an FTE basis)
- Student–teacher ratio: 12.79

Oregon School District is located south of Madison, in the village of Oregon, Wisconsin. A publicly elected school board provides direction and oversight, with a superintendent heading the organization's administration for over 4,000 students and 8 schools.

== Administration ==
- Superintendent: Leslie Bergstrom

=== School Board ===
- President: Krista Flanagan
- Vice President: Tim LeBrun
- Treasurer: Troy Pankratz
- Clerk: Ahna Bizjak

== Schools ==
=== Elementary schools ===
- Brooklyn (located south of Oregon in Village of Brooklyn) (PK–4)
- Forest Edge (PK-6; located in the City of Fitchburg)
- Netherwood Knoll (PK–4)
- Prairie View (PK–4)
- Oregon 4k (PK)

=== Intermediate school (5–6) ===
- Rome Corners

=== Middle school (7–8) ===
- Oregon Middle School

=== High school (9–12) ===
- Oregon High School

== Expansion ==
In January 2017 the Oregon School district projected it would grow by 2,000 students by 2030, a nearly 50% increase of the current enrollment. To deal with this expected surge, the school district built a new K-6 elementary school in 2018 and planned to pass a referendum for a second middle school in 2024.
