= Reedsburg Area High School =

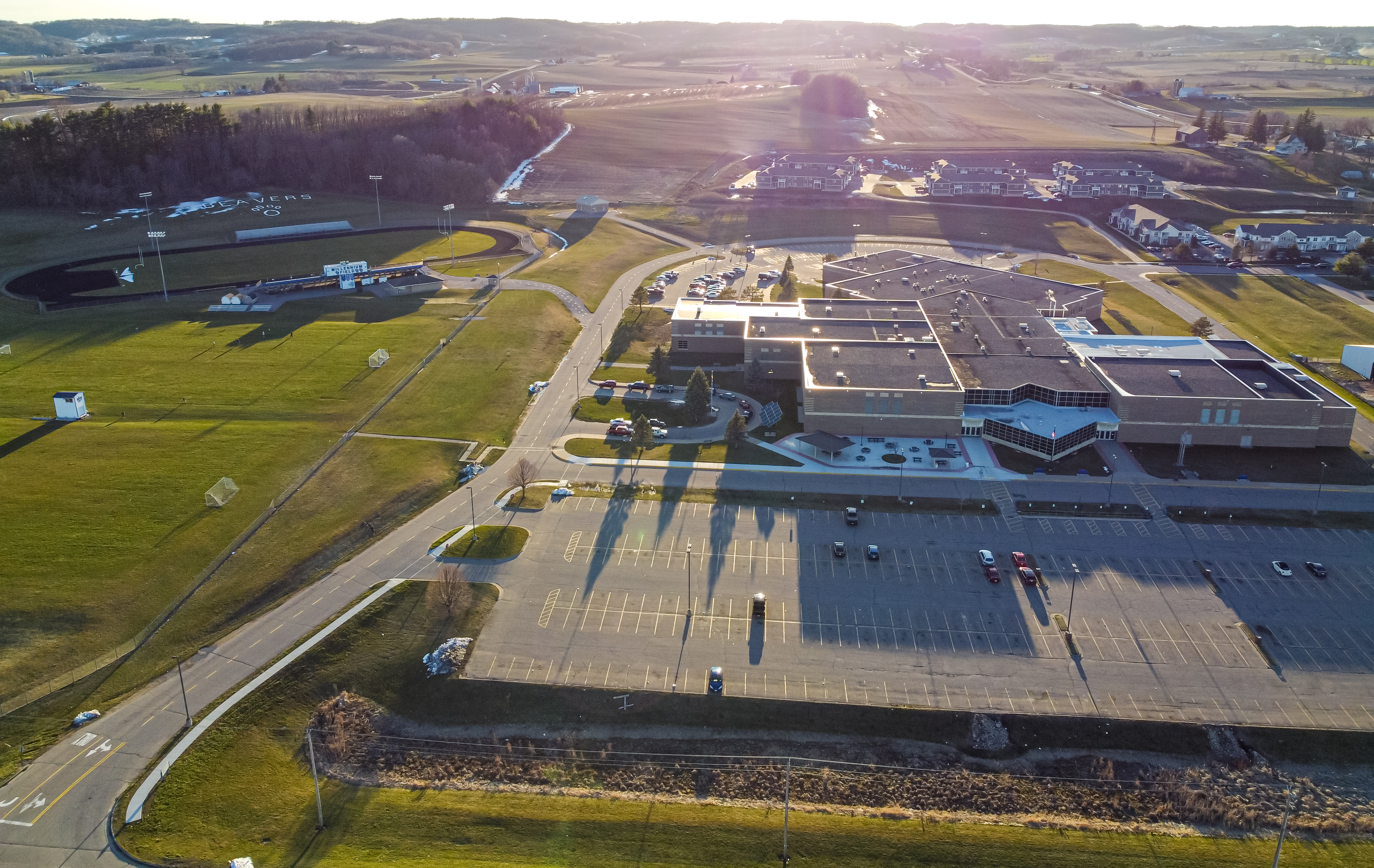

Location
- 1100 South Albert Avenue; Reedsburg, Wisconsin 53959; United States; 43.5226°N 90.0211°W

Information
- Other name: RAHS
- Established: 1998
- School district: School District of Reedsburg
- Superintendent: Roger Rindo
- Dean: Miranda Strutz
- Principal: Katie Mathews
- Teaching staff: 59.00 (FTE)
- Grades: 9-12
- Gender: Co-ed
- Enrollment: 889 (2024–2025)
- Student to teacher ratio: 15.07
- Schedule: Hybrid-Block
- Color
- Athletics conference: Badger Conference
- Mascot: Herbie the Beaver
- Nickname: Beavers
- Rival: Baraboo High School
- Website: http://www.rsd.k12.wi.us/schools/high/

Reedsburg Area High School is a public high school located in Reedsburg, Wisconsin, and is a part of the School District of Reedsburg. The high school was built in 1998 by Kraemer Brothers. It serves more than 900 students in grades 9-12 from Reedsburg, Loganville, La Valle, Ironton, Rock Springs, and the surrounding communities. Reedsburg Area High School's mascot is Herbie the Beaver. The school's colors are navy and white.

== Description ==
Katie Mathews and Matt Bauer are the current principals. The school offers AP courses and dual-credit classes with nearby Madison Area Technical College. RAHS offers several music options, along with a fall musical or one-act play, and a play in the spring. There are many sports and clubs available to all students.

== History ==
=== Early history ===
The first high school in Reedsburg was established in 1875. A new brick building was built in 1903 to better serve the larger population in Reedsburg. The new building was able to accommodate 120 students, compared to the roughly 50 student capacity of the previous school. This new building was 3 storeys tall, and included many state of the art amenities, such as drinking fountains, full electrical lighting, and a large athletic field. Due to the growing population of Reedsburg, they built a large addition to the school building in 1923, doubling the capacity to 260 students. In 1937, South School was built, and most grades were transferred to the new school.

It had become clear that Reedsburg would need a new high school building, as South School was beyond maximum capacity. The school board voted to purchase 22 acres of land on Webb Avenue, called the "Hay Creek Site". Several community members disapproved of this action, claiming that the swampy grounds would not provide a stable foundation. With the recommendation of the Board of Education, they moved ahead with the Hay Creek Site, but only building a one story structure due to the swampy conditions. Using funds donated by Herbert H. Webb, they called this new school Webb High School.

=== Late 1900s - present ===
In 1957, Webb High School finished construction, north of Webb Park. Herbert H. Webb donated the rest of his remaining fortune to the city of Reedsburg for the new high school, on his death in 1954. The Webb High School building was renovated and added to in 1962 and 1970. In the 1996 referendum, plans were made to build a new high school along South Albert Avenue, and repurpose Webb High School as the new middle school. The 1996 referendum passed, and the plans were set into motion. Reedsburg Area High School officially opened for the 1998–1999 school year.

The CAL Center opened in 1999 after the community donated over 2.3 million dollars towards its construction. In 2015, a new district storage room was added the side of the building, bordering the choir room. In 2020, the new fitness center was built, containing a new weight room, and new wrestling rooms.

== Additions ==
=== CAL Center ===
The CAL Center is a building adjacent to Reedsburg Area High School that hosts music and drama performances, as well as other events. The 598-seat auditorium opened in 1999. The CAL Center was funded entirely by private donations by individuals and local businesses that totaled over 2.3 million dollars. The auditorium includes a control booth, in-house sound console, and an orchestra pit. The CAL Center has a large green room and a scene shop.

The CAL Center was conceptualized during the 1996 referendum to build the new high school. The 2.3 million dollar CAL Center was left off of the 1996 referendum because the committee members didn't think it would pass. In just three years, the community had come together to donate a collective 2.3 million dollars to the CAL Center. It opened in September 1999.

=== Fitness Center ===
The Reedsburg Athletic Club has been fundraising since March 19, 2019, in order to get a new fitness center built at Reedsburg Area High School. They had a fundraising goal of $600,000, and as of September 18, 2019, the Reedsburg Athletic Club has received $120,000 in donations, and grants. As of February 5, 2020, the school board approved the addition of the new facility. The School District of Reedsburg will be using $1.8 million leftover 2017 referendum funds, $1 million in a 10-year loan, and the $600,000 fundraiser from the Reedsburg Athletic Club, in order to pay for the new fitness center.

== Extracurricular activities ==
=== Athletics ===
RAHS offers over 14 different sports available to its students. The list below shows the 2019–2020 school year.

Athletics at RAHS
Boys'	Girls'
Cross Country	Cross Country
Golf	Golf
Soccer	Soccer
Tennis	Tennis
Football	Volleyball
Basketball	Basketball
Wrestling	Gymnastics
Dance Team	Dance Team
Hockey	Hockey
Track & Field	Track & Field
Baseball	Softball
Show Choir	Show Choir

The school's varsity football team won the division three state championship on November 20, 2009, defeating West De Pere 34–27.

==== Athletic conference affiliation history ====
- South Central Conference (1926-1941)
- Southern Ten Conference (1941-1952)
- South Central Conference (1952-2001)
- Badger Conference (2001–present)
- Mississippi Valley Conference (football-only)

=== Clubs ===
RAHS offers 18 different clubs available to all students. The list below shows the 2019–2020 school year

- Archery Club
- Art Club
- Drama Club
- Esports Club
- FBLA
- FFA
- Forensics
- French Club
- Gleaner
- History Club
- Jazz Band
- Key Club
- Mock Trial
- National Honor Society
- Pep Band
- Spanish Club
- Special Olympics
- Student Council

RAHS has a competitive show choir, named the "Choraliers", and previously had a women's-only group, "Corodonna". During the 2020 season, Choraliers took home the Best Vocals, Best Band and Grand Championship awards at the Monona Grover Silver Stage Invitational.

In 2019, the Reedsburg Area High School Drama Club was selected to perform their "Joseph and the Amazing Technicolor Dreamcoat" musical for the Wisconsin High School Theatre Festival in the Milwaukee High School of the Arts.

== Notable alumni ==
- Edward Brooks, Wisconsin State Assemblyman
- Edward Dithmar, lieutenant governor of Wisconsin

== See also ==
- List of High Schools in Wisconsin
