= Milton High School (Wisconsin) =

Location
- 114 W. High Street; Milton, Wisconsin; United States; 42°46′29″N 88°57′14″W

Information
- Type: Public
- School district: Milton School District
- Principal: Keith Nerby
- Faculty: 61.19 (on FTE basis)
- Grades: 9 to 12
- Enrollment: 1,054 (2023–2024)
- Student to teacher ratio: 17.23
- Colors: Black, red, and white
- Athletics conference: WIAA Badger South Conference(formerly Southern Lakes Conference)
- Sports: Tennis, Swim, Football, Basketball, Soccer, Cross Country, Wrestling, Volleyball, Baseball, Softball, Track, Gymnastics, Golf
- Mascot: Rocky the Red Hawk
- Team name: Red Hawks
- Rival: Janesville Craig
- Newspaper: MHS Today
- Yearbook: Talon
- Website: Milton High School

Milton High School is a public high school located in Milton, Wisconsin. Its enrollment was estimated at, “over 1,100 students” for the 2026–27 school year.

== Academics ==
MHS offers Advanced Placement classes. About a third of the student body takes at least one AP class throughout their tenure at MHS.

== Demographics ==
Ninety-two percent of Milton students are white, four percent Hispanic, two percent Asian and one percent black, while one percent of students identify as two or more races.

== Activities ==
MHS has two show choirs: the mixed-gender Choralation, and the single-gender Octave Above. Choralation and Octave Above have found success in their respective divisions, with Choralation winning a competition at Monona Grove High School in 2018. The show choirs also host their own competition, Milton Rock the Rock (formerly known as the Choralation Invitational), which takes place the third weekend of January.

== Athletics ==
Milton is in the Badger Conference. Previously they were in the Southern Lakes Conference, but in 2010 moved to the Badger Conference because of a regional realignment of schools to better represent student enrollment.

Milton has enjoyed success in several sports. Its wrestling program has qualified for the state team championships nine times, most recently in 2010. The team won the tournament in 2002, defeating reigning champion Wisconsin Rapids Lincoln 25–21. The team also won 22 consecutive conference championships from 1994 to 2015. Its football program has also realized some success, winning Division 3 titles in 1986 and 1989.

The school mascot is the Red Hawk.

=== Athletic conference affiliation history ===
- Rock River Valley League (1922-1952)
- Badger Conference (1952-1955)
- Madison Suburban Conference (1955-1969)
- Central Suburban Conference (1969-1977)
- Rock Valley Conference (1977-1982)
- Southern Lakes Conference (1982-2008)
- Badger Conference (2008–present)

== Notable alumni ==
- John Boie, 2020 Olympic Gold Medalist (Wheelchair Basketball)
- John T. Manske, Wisconsin State Representative
- Scott Johnson, Wisconsin State Representative
- Gavin Kilen, Professional Baseball Player
