= Learning Atrium =

The Learning Atrium is an educational institution in southern Wisconsin which assists primary and secondary school students in Catholic schools with dyslexia to read at grade level. Growing out of the St. Ambrose Academy Reading Institute which was established in 2016, the programming was transferred to the Learning Atrium in 2020.

The organization coordinates one-on-one tutoring of students with dyslexia using the Barton Reading and Spelling System. The organization also provides student screening, assessments, and tutor training. The organization's director is Deb Krebs. Financial support for the organization is provided by The Apostolate for Persons with Disabilities.

In addition to serving students at St. Ambrose Academy, the organization collaborates with St. James School in Madison, and St. Victor School in Monroe, Wisconsin.
