= Portage Community School District (Wisconsin) =

School district in Wisconsin, United States

Coordinates: 43.5391°N 89.4626°W

The Portage Community School District in Portage, Wisconsin, is a combination of seven elementary schools. The two centralized schools are Woodridge Elementary (Pre-K through 1) and John Muir Elementary (2 through 6). There are four outline schools, Fort Winnebago Elementary (K through 6) is located in Columbia County on the outer edge of Portage. Rusch Elementary (K through 6) is located in downtown Portage and is the second largest elementary school. Endeavor Elementary (K through 6) is located in Marquette County in the town of Endeavor. Lewiston Elementary (K through 6) is located in the outer land of Portage and is the smallest elementary school in the district.

The Portage Community School District also encompasses the Wayne E. Bartels Middle School (7 through 8). The middle school was recently renamed in 2010 after the death of the principal Wayne Bartels. The school board unanimously decided to rename the school in his honor.

The Portage Community School District is home to the Portage High School (9 through 12). Portage High School mascot is a ‘flying P’ for the Portage Warriors. The high school offers many opportunities for students to become involved in events, clubs, sports, and other activities. Portage High School offers: FBLA, FFA, Key Club, Skills USA, Student Council, German Club, Spanish Club, HOSA, GSA, Writing Club, Video Club, Cheerleading, Dance Team, Scrabble Club, Captain's Academy, Destination Imagination, National Honor Society, Student Tutors, Weightlifting Club, Art Club, Basketball, Baseball, Football, Wrestling, Marching Band, Choir, Swimming, Curling, Tennis, Golf, Track, Softball, Ski Team, Color Guard.
