= Mount Horeb High School =

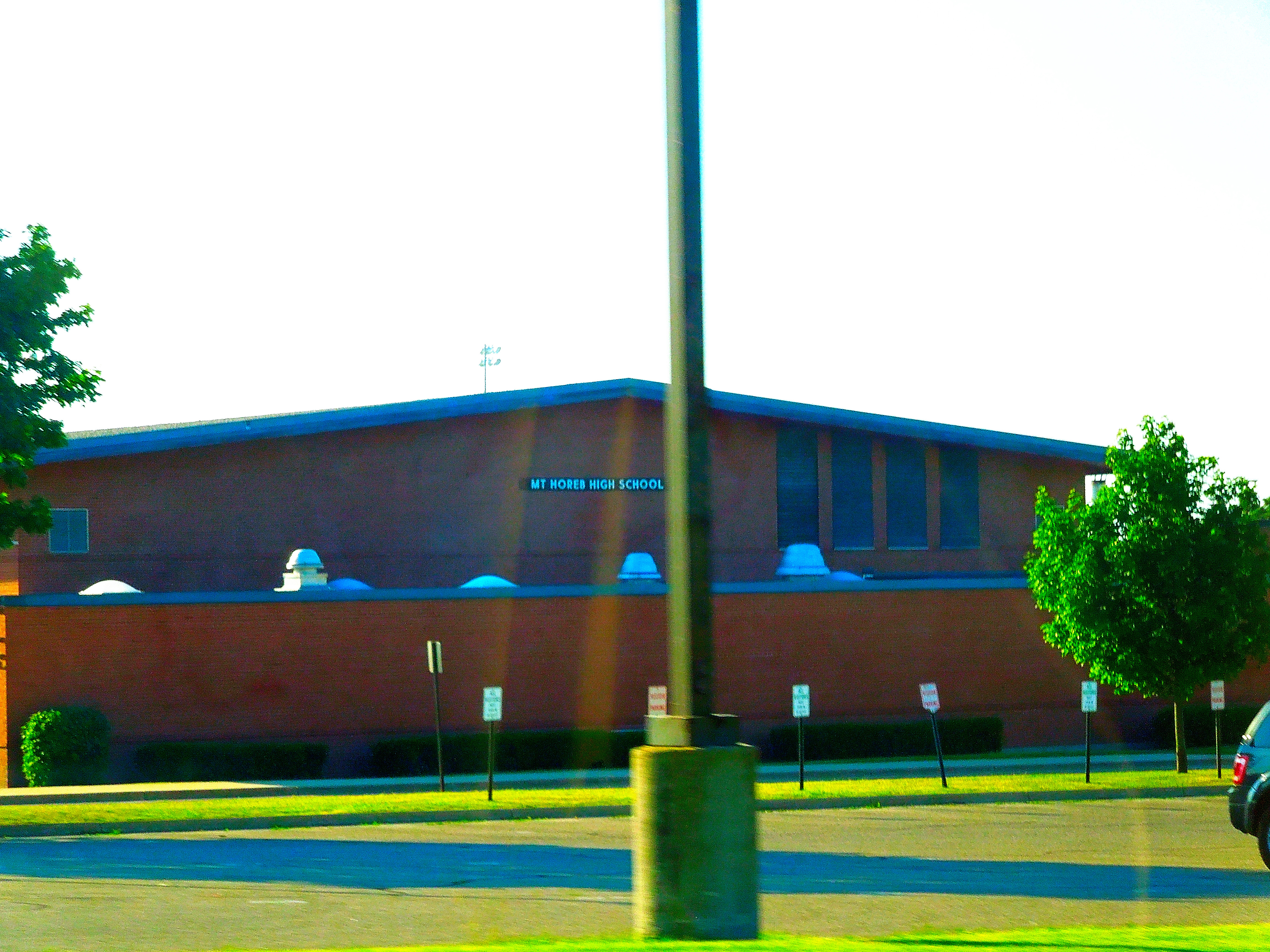

Location
- 305 S 8th St; Mount Horeb, Wisconsin; United States; 43.0045°N 89.7292°W

Information
- School district: Mount Horeb Area School District
- Principal: Cody Lundquist
- Teaching staff: 50.88 (FTE)
- Grades: 9–12
- Gender: Co-ed
- Enrollment: 776 (2023–2024)
- Student to teacher ratio: 15.25
- Colors: Red and white
- Mascot: Viking
- Website: hs.mounthorebschools.org

Mount Horeb High School is a public high school located in Mount Horeb, Wisconsin, and is a part of the Mount Horeb Area School District. Mount Horeb High School serves 776 students in Mount Horeb, and Blue Mounds. The High School's mascot is the Vikings. Cody Lundquist is the principal as of 2020.

The school was opened in 1919. Its current building was built in 1961.

== Academics ==
The high school began an International Baccalaureate program in the 2025-2026 school year.

== Athletics ==
Mount Horeb's athletic teams are nicknamed the Vikings, and they have been members of the Badger Conference since 2001.

=== Athletic conference affiliation history ===
- Southwest Wisconsin Athletic League (1926-1971)
- Southern Eight Conference (1971-1983)
- Capitol Conference (1983-2001)
- Badger Conference (2001–present)

== Notable alumni ==
- Max Meylor (2016) - professional football quarterback
