= Derek Carrier =

American football player (born 1990)

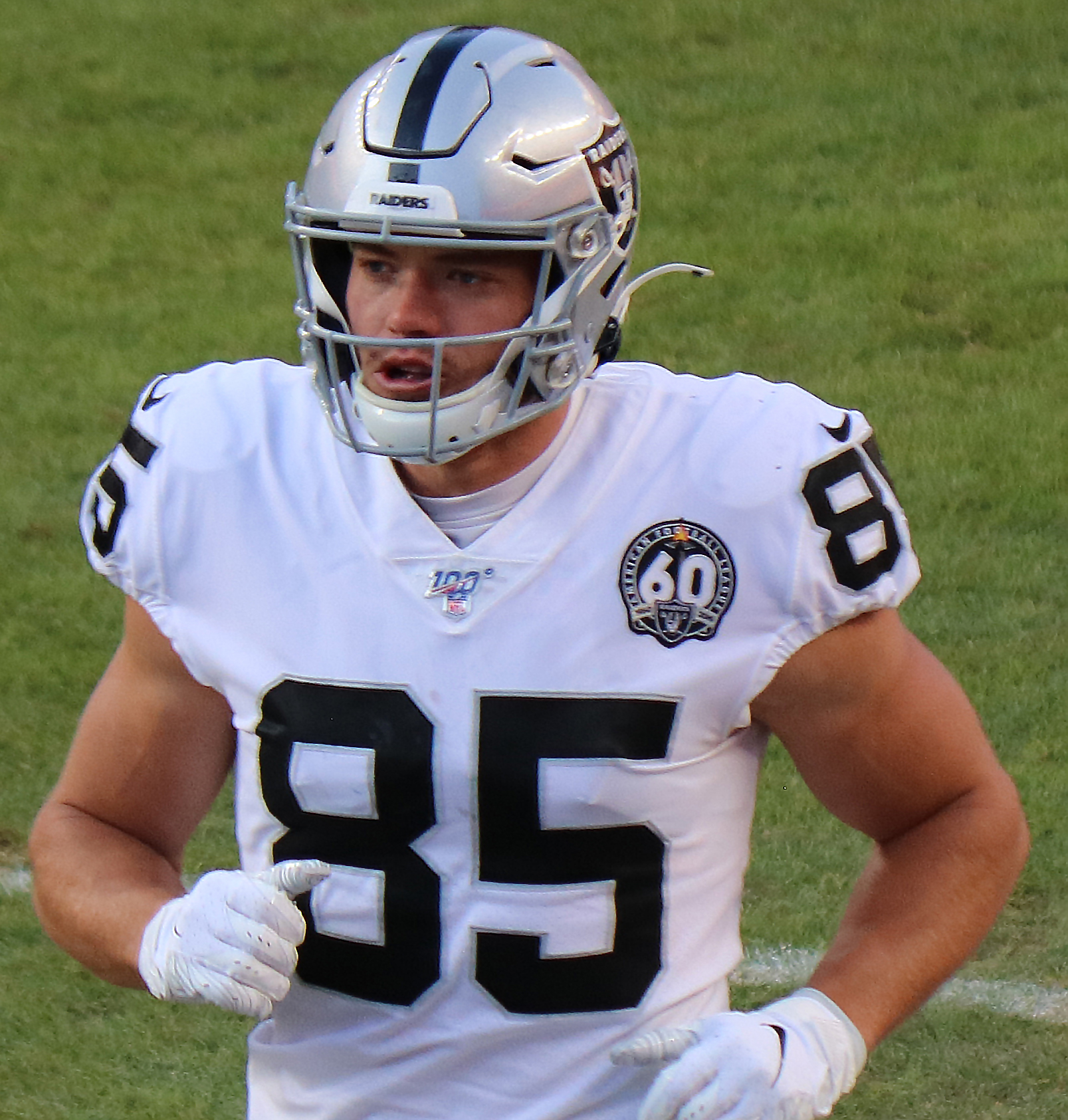
- Carrier with the Oakland Raiders in 2019

No. 46, 89, 86, 85
- Position: Tight end

Personal information
- Born: July 25, 1990 (age 36); Edgerton, Wisconsin, U.S.
- Listed height: 6 ft 3 in (1.91 m)
- Listed weight: 240 lb (109 kg)

Career information
- High school: Edgerton
- College: Beloit (2008–2011)
- NFL draft: 2012: undrafted

Career history
- Oakland Raiders (2012)*; Philadelphia Eagles (2012–2013)*; San Francisco 49ers (2013–2014); Washington Redskins (2015–2016); Los Angeles Rams (2017); Oakland / Las Vegas Raiders (2018–2021)
- * Offseason or practice squad member only

Career NFL statistics
- Receptions: 59
- Receiving yards: 529
- Receiving touchdowns: 3
- Stats at Pro Football Reference

Derek Carrier (born July 25, 1990) is an American former professional football player who was a tight end in the National Football League (NFL). Carrier played college football for the Beloit Buccaneers.

== Early life ==
Carrier attended Edgerton High School in Edgerton, Wisconsin. He played basketball and football while at Edgerton High School.

== College career ==
The Wisconsin Badgers offered Carrier the opportunity to play college football as a preferred walk-on but Carrier instead chose to attend NCAA Division III Beloit College because Beloit also offered to allow him to play college basketball. After two years, Carrier left the basketball team and began running indoor track, competing in the 55 meters, long jump and triple jump. Carrier was a member of the Sigma Chi fraternity and was pre-med.

== Professional career ==
Pre-draft measurables
Height	Weight	40-yard dash	10-yard split	20-yard split	20-yard shuttle	Three-cone drill	Vertical jump	Broad jump	Bench press
6 ft 3 3/8 in (1.91 m)	238 lb (108 kg)	4.50 s	1.57 s	2.53 s	4.08 s	6.65 s	38 in (0.97 m)	10 ft 2 in (3.10 m)	15 reps
All values from Wisconsin's Pro Day

=== Oakland Raiders ===
Carrier was signed by the Oakland Raiders as an undrafted free agent on April 28, 2012. He was signed to a three-year, $1.44 million contract. On August 30, he was waived by the Raiders.

=== Philadelphia Eagles ===
On September 11, 2012, Carrier was signed by the Philadelphia Eagles and added to the team's practice squad. On August 25, 2013, he was released by the Eagles.

=== San Francisco 49ers ===
On September 3, 2013, he was signed by the San Francisco 49ers and added to the practice squad. On November 16, 2013, he was promoted to the active roster.

In the 2014 season, Carrier had nine receptions for 105 receiving yards in 11 games and one start. On March 9, 2015, the San Francisco 49ers signed Carrier to a three-year, $2.98 million contract that includes a signing bonus of $400,000.

=== Washington Redskins ===
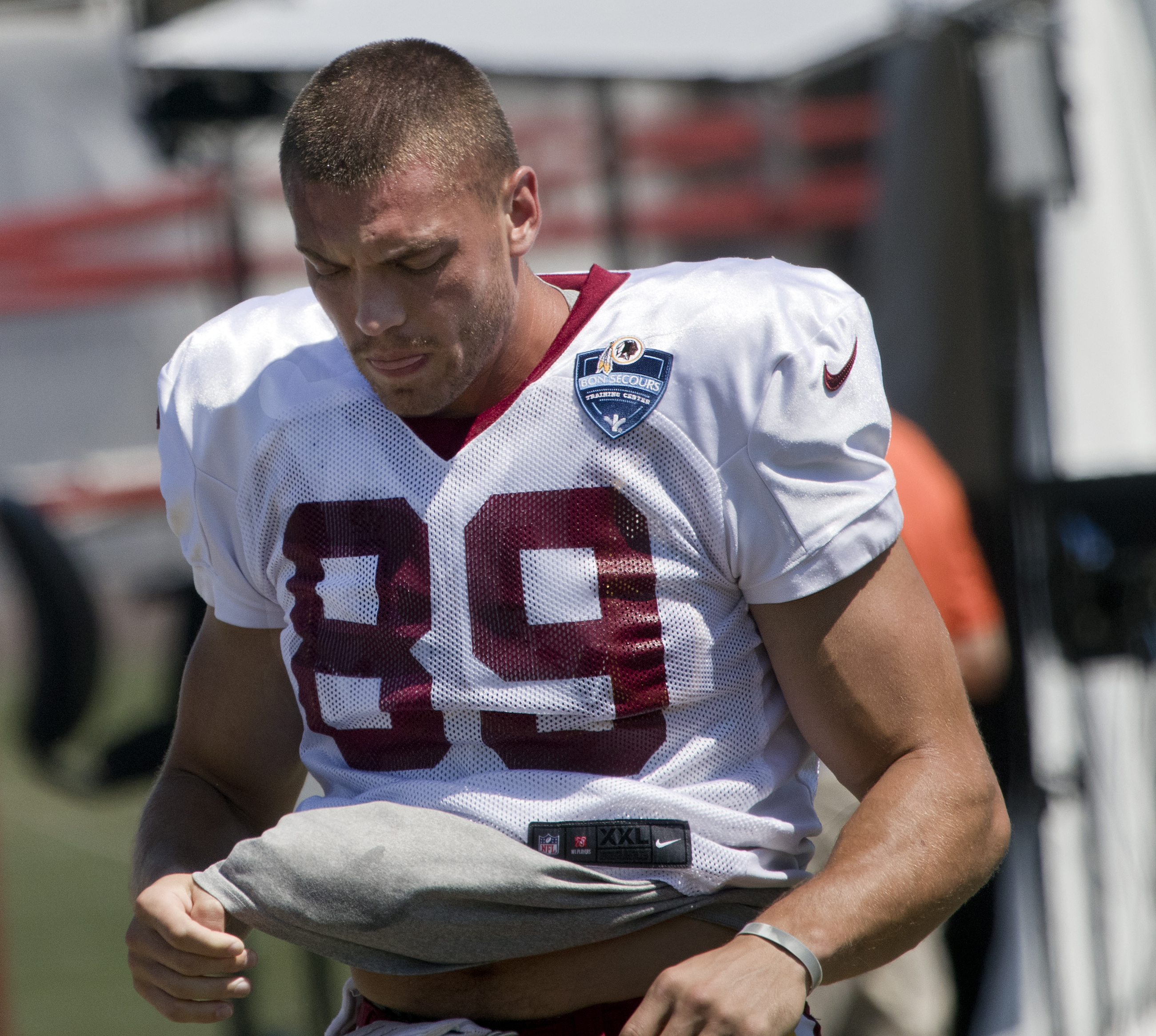
Carrier with the Washington Redskins in 2017

On August 21, 2015, Carrier was traded to the Washington Redskins for a conditional fifth round pick in the 2017 NFL draft. In Week 5 against the Atlanta Falcons, he recorded his first career touchdown on a seven-yard pass from quarterback Kirk Cousins. After tearing his ACL and MCL in Week 14 against the Chicago Bears, the Redskins placed him on injured reserve on December 14. He finished the 2015 season with 17 receptions for 141 receiving yards and one receiving touchdown in 12 games and starts.

Carrier started the 2016 season on the PUP list to recover from torn ligaments in his knee. He was officially activated to the active roster on November 12, 2016, prior to Week 10.

=== Los Angeles Rams ===
On September 2, 2017, Carrier was traded to the Los Angeles Rams for a 2018 seventh-round draft pick. The Rams traded for him after Temarrick Hemingway suffered a fractured fibula and were in need of a third tight end. He was reunited with his former offensive coordinator in Washington and new Los Angeles Rams' head coach Sean McVay.

In the 2017 season, Carrier appeared in 14 games and started two. He had eight receptions for 71 receiving yards. In addition, he had a role on special teams.

=== Oakland / Las Vegas Raiders (second stint) ===
On March 15, 2018, Carrier signed a three-year contract with the Oakland Raiders. In Week 14 of the 2018 season, Carrier scored a receiving touchdown in the 24–21 victory over the Pittsburgh Steelers. In Week 13 of the 2019 season, he recorded a receiving touchdown against the Kansas City Chiefs in the 40–9 loss.

Carrier was fined $15,000 by the NFL on October 5, 2020, for attending a maskless charity event hosted by teammate Darren Waller during the COVID-19 pandemic in violation of the NFL's COVID-19 protocols for the 2020 season.

On March 19, 2021, Carrier re-signed with the Raiders on a one-year contract. He suffered a pec injury in Week 4 and was placed on injured reserve on October 9, 2021. He was activated on January 8, 2022.
