= Drew Evans =

American football player

No. 62 – Indiana Hoosiers
- Position: Offensive lineman
- Class: Redshirt Senior

Personal information
- Listed height: 6 ft 4 in (1.93 m)
- Listed weight: 306 lb (139 kg)

Career information
- High school: Fort Atkinson (Fort Atkinson, Wisconsin)
- College: Wisconsin (2022); Indiana (2023–present)

Awards and highlights
- CFP national champion (2025)
- Stats at ESPN

Drew Evans is an American college football offensive lineman for the Indiana Hoosiers. He previously played for the Wisconsin Badgers.

== Early life ==
Evans attended Fort Atkinson High School in Fort Atkinson, Wisconsin, where he played football and basketball. Evans also competed in track and field, setting a school record in shot put and additionally participating in the discus throw. He was a second-team all-conference selection in basketball, and playing right tackle on the school's football team, he earned first-team all-conference honors. He was rated a two-star college football prospect by 247Sports and committed to play for the Wisconsin Badgers as a walk-on athlete.

== College career ==
Evans joined the Wisconsin Badgers in 2022, but did not appear in any games that year, taking a redshirt for the season. He transferred to play for the Indiana Hoosiers just before the start of the 2023 season as a scholarship athlete but did not play in any games in 2023. Evans started the first nine games in 2024 at left guard before suffering a season-ending Achilles tendon rupture during a team practice. In those nine games, Evans allowed zero sacks on 282 pass blocks and was the team's highest-rated pass blocker according to Pro Football Focus. In 2025, Evans returned to the starting left guard role for the first eight games of the season until a lower-body injury sustained in a game against the UCLA Bruins forced him to miss the following three games against the Maryland Terrapins, Penn State Nittany Lions, Wisconsin Badgers, and Purdue Boilermakers, returning for the 2025 Big Ten Football Championship Game. Indiana finished the season with a win in the 2026 College Football Playoff National Championship.
