= Edgerton High School =

Location
- Edgerton, Wisconsin; United States
- Coordinates: 42.84248°N 89.07358°W

Information
- Type: Public Secondary
- Motto: Inspiring Excellence in School, Work, and Life
- School district: Edgerton School District
- Faculty: Mark Coombs
- Teaching staff: 36.05 (FTE)
- Grades: 9–12
- Enrollment: 562 (2023–2024)
- Student to teacher ratio: 15.59
- Color
- Nickname: Crimson Tide
- Website: https://www.edgerton.k12.wi.us/o/ehs

Edgerton High School is a high school located in Edgerton, Wisconsin. Edgerton High School's mascot is the Crimson Tide.

== History ==
In 1890 Edgerton High School was at the center of a controversy about the separation of church and state, resulting in the landmark "Edgerton Bible Case."

== Sports ==
Edgerton High School won the Class B state baseball championship in 1990, defeating Luxemburg-Casco 1–0 in the title game.

=== Athletic conference affiliation history ===
- Rock River Valley League (1922-1928)
- Southern Six Conference (1928-1941)
- Southern Ten Conference (1941-1952)
- Badger Conference (1952-1977)
- Rock Valley Conference (1977–present)

== Notable alumni ==
- Rich Bickle - professional race car driver
- Derek Carrier - NFL football player for the San Francisco 49ers and Washington Redskins
- Ryan Fox - US national team rower
- Steve Stricker - professional golfer
