= Portage High School (Wisconsin) =

- 301 East Collins Street; Portage, Wisconsin 53901; United States

Information
- School district: Portage Community School District
- Principal: Jennifer Garrigan
- Staff: 48.40 (FTE)
- Grades: 9–12
- Enrollment: 647 (2023–2024)
- Student to teacher ratio: 13.37
- Color
- Mascot: Warrior
- Yearbook: Wauona
- Website: https://www.portage.k12.wi.us/schools/high/

Portage High School is a high school in Portage, Wisconsin. It is part of the Portage Community School District. Portage High School mainly serves the Portage and Endeavor communities.

Portage High School is set up in a pod formation. For English, History, and Math, all classrooms are entered through a central "hub." This hub leads to the main hallways. The school has two floors. Band, Choir, Gym, Tech Ed., Family and Consumer Ed., Science, Math, Computer Science, and Business Ed. classes are located on the first floor. Art, World Languages, Social Studies, and English classes are held on the second floor.

The library, recently named the "iCenter," was refurbished over the summer of 2011. The goal of the iCenter is to be more student and technology friendly. The use of a Tech Center, multiple computer labs, and portable laptop carries help the school incorporate technology into the students' work.

== Academics ==
Portage High School offers ten Advanced Placement (AP) classes. Those AP classes are American History, Biology, Calculus, Chemistry, Computer Science, English Language & Composition, English Literature & Composition, Music Theory, Physics, and Psychology. Portage High School recently received recognition for receiving the highest AP scores in the state of Wisconsin.

Portage's academic departments include English, Social Studies, Science, Math, Agriculture/Natural Resources, Art, Business/Information Technology, Computer Science, Health, Music, Physical Education, Technology/Engineering Education, Family and Consumer Sciences and World Languages.

The Technology/Engineering Education department at Portage is very strong. Fifteen different courses are offered in the areas of drafting, graphics, architecture, automobiles, construction, manufacturing, and engineering. The department ties in with the school's Skills USA club.

German and Spanish are the two foreign languages offered at PHS. Students have the opportunity of completing up to five years (levels) of each language. The German club allows German students to travel to Germany every two years, and welcomes foreign exchange students from Germany. The Spanish club is making plans for its initial trip to Costa Rica.

== Extra-curricular activities ==
=== Music ===
Portage High offers a wide variety of music groups. Both the band and choral departments create the music department at Portage High School.

=== Choirs ===
The choirs are directed by Holly Atkinson. The choirs that are offered are mixed choir, concert choir, chamber choir, men's choir, women's choir, and swing choir. The swing choir is fairly new.

==== Musical ====
Portage High School students can audition for an annual musical. The high school has participated in a musical for nearly 50 years. Lately, the productions at PHS have been nominated for numerous Tommy Awards with many nominees receiving the award.

- 2015- Godspell
- 2014- Beauty and the Beast
- 2013- Guys and Dolls
- 2012- The Sound of Music
- 2011- Back to the 80's
- 2010- The Pajama Game
- 2009- All Shook Up
- 2008- Seussical the Musical
- 2007- Jesus Christ Superstar
- 2006- My Fair Lady
- 2001- My Favorite Year

=== Bands ===
Tom Shaver directs the bands. The bands that are offered are symphonic band, wind ensemble, jazz combo, two jazz bands, world drumming, general marching band, and a competitive marching band.

==== Marching Band ====
Portage High School has a growing competitive marching band. The Portage High School Warrior Marching Band competes at field show competitions in the A class. The band travels to competitions throughout the year. Their season ends with a performance at the WSMA State Marching Band Competition at UW Whitewater in Whitewater, WI. The members have the opportunities to march at Universal Studios and Walt Disney World in Florida, as well as participate in a trip to New York City.

The marching band prides itself on being completely student-led. With the exception of the director and one colorguard advisor, student leaders are responsible for instructing and conducting other band members. Students have the opportunity to obtain positions as drum majors, section leaders, marching stylists, drill editors, and colorguard captains. Portage is one of the only competitive student-led marching bands in the WSMA competition system.

Awards:

- 2016: 3rd Place- WSMA State Championships
- 2016: 2nd Divisional Award (Class AA)- WSMA State Championships
- 2016: 2nd Place- Wisconsin Lutheran Invitational
- 2016: 4th Place- Greendale Invitational
- 2016: 2nd Place- Waukesha North Bandfest
- 2016: 2nd Place- Mukwonago Phantom Phest

-

- 2015: 6th Place - WSMA State Championships
- 2015: 2nd Divisional Award (Class A) - WSMA State Championships
- 2015: 4th Place- River Falls Competition
- 2015: 4th Place- Chippewa Falls Competition
- 2015: 2nd Place- Baldwin Competition
- 2015: 2nd Place- Cumberland Competition

-

- 2014: 3rd Place - WSMA State Championships
- 2014: 2nd Divisional Award (Class A) - WSMA State Championships
- 2014: Best Musical Presentation - WSMA State Championships
- 2014: 1st Place - Merrill Competition
- 2014: 1st Place - Weston Competition
- 2014: 1st Place - Baldwin Competition
- 2014: 3rd Place - Cumberland Competition

-

- 2013: 6th Place - WSMA State Championships
- 2013: 1st Divisional Award (Class A) - WSMA State Championships
- 2013: 2nd Place - Sauk Prairie Competition
- 2013: Espirit de Corps Award - Weston Competition
- 2013: 3rd Place - Weston Competition
- 2013: Espirit de Corps Award - Merrill Competition
- 2013: 3rd Place - Merrill Competition

-

- 2012: 6th Place - WSMA State Championships
- 2012: 1st Divisional Award (Class A) - WSMA State Championships
- 2012: Espirit de Corps Award - Weston Competition
- 2012: 3rd Place - Weston Competition
- 2012: Espirit de Corps Award - Merrill Competition
- 2012: 3rd Place - Merrill Competition

-

- 2011: 7th Place - WSMA State Championships
- 2011: 2nd Divisional Award (Class AA) - WSMA State Championships

-

- 2010: 7th Place - WSMA State Championships
- 2010: 2nd Divisional Award (Class AA) - WSMA State Championships

-

- 2009: 6th Place- WSMA State Championships
- 2009: 2nd Divisional Award (Class AA)- WSMA State Championships

-

- 2008: 9th Place- WSMA State Championships
- 2008: 2nd Divisional Award (Class AA)- WSMA State Championships

-

- 2007: 1st Divisional Award (Festival Class) - WSMA State Championships

=== Clubs and groups ===
Portage high offers a wide range of clubs. The clubs are:

- FBLA
- FFA
- Key Club
- Skills USA
- Student Council
- German Club
- Spanish Club
- HOSA
- Gay-straight alliance
- Writing Club
- Video Club
- Cheerleading
- Dance Team
- Scrabble Club
- Captain's Academy
- Destination Imagination
- National Honor Society
- Student Tutors
- Weightlifting Club
- Art Club
- Fashion Club
- Link Crew
- Dungeons and Dragons Club

== Athletics ==
Portage offers many different athletic programs.

- Boys Sports:

Football, cross country, soccer, basketball, curling, wrestling, dance, cheer, la crosse, baseball, track/field, golf, tennis, hockey, skiing

- Girls Sports:

Golf, volleyball, tennis, basketball, track/field, cheer, dance, soccer, softball, curling, swimming, hockey, skiing

- The Warrior Boys Baseball Team was the 2006 and 2012 Division II state champions.
- The Warrior Girls Softball Team was the 2005 Division II state champions.

=== Curling ===
Portage High School has a long history of success in curling. Many state championship titles have been achieved over the decades. Also, many of the members of the curling team have been granted the opportunity to compete at the national level.

- Boys Curling State Championships:

1960, 1973, 1975, 1981, 1982, 1983, 1991, 1996, 2001, 2012, 2014, 2025

- Girls Curling State Championships:

1978, 1987, 1993, 1994, 1995, 1996, 2000, 2001, 2008, 2010, 2013, 2014, 2015, 2025

=== Athletic conference affiliation history ===
- Little Ten Conference (1925-1926)
- South Central Conference (1926-1941)
- Southern Ten Conference (1941-1952)
- South Central Conference (1952-2001)
- Badger Conference (2001–present)
