= Evansville High School (Wisconsin) =

High school in Wisconsin, United States

Coordinates: 42°46′11.5″N 89°18′37.4″W

Location
- 640 South 5th Street; Evansville, (Rock County), Wisconsin 53536; United States

Information
- Type: Public high school
- Principal: Jeff Crandall
- Staff: 36.57 (FTE)
- Enrollment: 518 (2023-2024)
- Student to teacher ratio: 14.16
- Colors: Royal blue and white
- Fight song: "Illinois Loyalty"
- Athletics conference: Rock Valley
- Nickname: Blue Devils
- Website: https://www.ecsdnet.org/schools/high/

Evansville High School (EHS) is a high school in Evansville, Wisconsin, United States. It was designed by Helmut Ajango. It is located at 640 South 5th Street. The school's teams compete as the Blue Devils. In 2006 it was a No Child Left Behind Blue Ribbon school. Enrollment as of January 2014 was reported at 529. Evansville High School offers eight AP courses as well as "articulated" courses in engineering drawing and design; welding; business law, accounting, and some select classes through Lakeland College (Wisconsin).

The school uses a geothermal system.

== Athletics ==
Evansville's athletic teams are nicknamed the Blue Devils, and they have been members of the Rock Valley Conference since 1969 (when it was formed as the Central Suburban Conference).

=== Athletic conference affiliation history ===
- Rock River Valley League (1925-1952)
- Badger Conference (1952-1955)
- Madison Suburban Conference (1955-1969)
- Central Suburban Conference (1969-1977)
- Rock Valley Conference (1977–present)
