= St. Ambrose Academy =

School in Wisconsin, United States

Location
- 702 S. High Point Road Suite 209, Madison, WI 53719; Madison, (Dane County), Wisconsin 53719; United States
- 43.05482776897003°N 89.51486212211628°W

Information
- Type: Private, Coeducational
- Motto: Omnia Christus est nobis! (Christ is everything for us!)
- Religious affiliation: Roman Catholic
- Patron saint: St. Ambrose of Milan
- Established: 2003; 23 years ago
- NCES School ID: A0503758
- President: John Darnell
- Head of school: John Scudder
- Faculty: 17
- Grades: 6–12
- Enrollment: 248 (2025–2026)
- Colors: Red and gold
- Sports: Basketball, volleyball (co-op) cross country, soccer (co-op), football (co-op), Softball (co-op), track & field (co-op), golf (co-op), tennis
- Team name: Guardians
- Accreditation: NAPC*IS
- Grades 6-8 tuition: $10,800
- Grades 9-12 tuition: $11,850
- Website: www.ambroseacademy.org

St. Ambrose Academy is a Roman Catholic middle school and high school located on the west side of Madison, Wisconsin. Founded in 2003, the school's stated purpose is to offer "a classical education rooted in the Catholic faith."

== History ==
Established in 2003, with classrooms at a facility of Cardinal Stritch University in Madison, by 2004 the school had 14 students. That year the Madison Plan Commission granted a conditional use permit to St. Thomas Aquinas parish for a school at 602 Everglade Drive with up to 60 students. The school operated in the religious education wing of St. Thomas Aquinas parish until 2021.

Scott Schmiesing became principal of St. Ambrose Academy in July 2008. In 2009, the school was accredited by NAPC*IS, the National Association of Private Catholic* and Independent Schools. In 2010, the City of Madison Plan Commission approved enrollment of up to 140 at the school's St. Thomas Aquinas Parish quarters.

As enrollment grew, school leadership looked for alternative sites. The Christ Our Light building campaign began in late 2018 with the goal of raising funds necessary for a complete campus to serve existing families and future enrollment projections.

In February 2024, St. Ambrose Academy announced that the school had leased and was renovating floors in the Holy Name Heights building, owned by the Madison Catholic Diocese, at 702 S. High Point Road Suite 209, Madison, WI 53719. The building is situated on over 70 acres of greenspace on the west side of Madison. The new campus, comprising nearly 24,000 square feet, can serve up to 280 students. The location also offers use of an oratory for worship, a gymnasium and outdoor ball fields and greenspaces, and a renovated community space for large gatherings. The school moved there in summer 2024.

The Dane County health office, on August 21, 2020, ordered St. Ambrose Academy and all county schools to close in-person instruction in grades 3-12, effective August 24, 2020. The school joined with seven number of parochial schools in demanding that the county revoke the emergency order on the grounds that the order was unconstitutional and unlawful. The school launched a crowdfunding website which raised over $100,000 within days to cover anticipated legal fees. On September 10, 2020, the Wisconsin Supreme Court temporarily enjoined Dane County from closing schools. On June 11, 2021, the Wisconsin Supreme Court vacated those portions of the Dane County Order "restricting or prohibiting -in-person instruction." The court held that "local health officers do not have the statutory power to close schools" and that an order attempting to close religious schools "infringes the Petitioners' fundamental right to the free exercise of religion guaranteed under Article I, Section 18 of the Wisconsin Constitution..."

== Curriculum ==
The seven core subjects are English, history, Latin, math, religion, science, and philosophy. Topical studies that follow a historical progression are taught in a four-year cycle for the senior high and a three-year cycle for the junior high. Each cycle's historical topic is integrated in history, English, and religion, with the other courses reinforcing these studies where possible, yielding a "unified and interdisciplinary approach to each historical period." High school students are required to take two years of Latin.

St. Ambrose Academy high school core curriculum
	History	Religion	Science	English
One	Ancients	The Church in the Pagan World/Logic	Biology	Ancients
Two	Medieval/Renaissance	Scripture	Chemistry	Medieval/Renaissance
Three	America/Government	Moral Theology, Liturgy & Sacraments	Physics	American/Government
Four	Enlightenment/The Modern World	The Church in the Modern World	Advanced Science	Enlightenment/The Modern World

Religious instruction is integrated across the curriculum and the school believes "that a return to classical methodology in the context of a Christ-filled community is the most effective way to form the human person in the modern world."

== Learning services ==
In 2016, the school established the St. Ambrose Academy Reading Institute to assist Catholic school students with dyslexia. This program became the independent Learning Atrium in 2020. The school continues to enlist the services of the Learning Atrium to support students with varying learning styles. The school has also expanded its own Learning Services Department to better serve students and families.
