= Monona Grove High School =

Public school in Wisconsin, United States

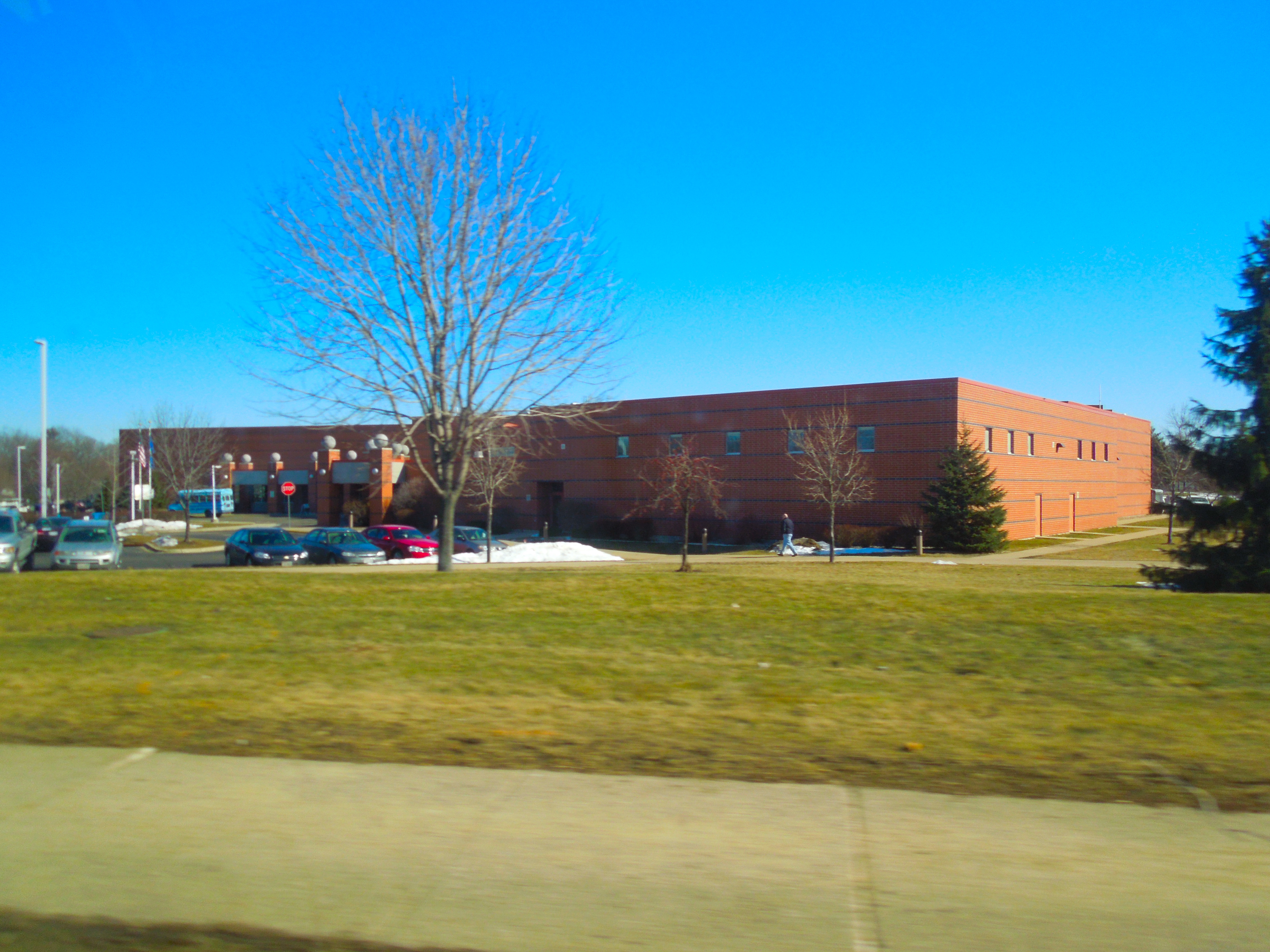

Location
- 4400 Monona Dr; Monona, Wisconsin 53716; United States of America
- Coordinates: 43.07186°N 89.3244°W

Information
- School type: Public secondary school
- Established: 1955
- School district: Monona Grove School District
- NCES District ID: 5509810
- NCES School ID: 550981001291
- Principal: Mitchal McGrath
- Teaching staff: 83.81 (FTE)
- Grades: 9–12
- Student to teacher ratio: 13.65
- Schedule type: Block schedule
- Color
- Athletics conference: Badger Conference
- Mascot: Silver Eagle
- Yearbook: Silver Scroll
- Communities served: Cottage Grove, Monona, Blooming Grove, Madison

Monona Grove High School (MGHS) is a school in Monona, Wisconsin, United States. Mitchal McGrath is the principal. The school was first established in 1955 to serve students from the City of Monona, and the village and town of Cottage Grove and formerly served students from Town of Blooming Grove.

== History ==
The prior high school building was built in 1955. The current building was constructed in 1999.

== Demographics ==
Monona Grove is 85 percent white, five percent Hispanic, three percent Asian, three percent black, and three percent of students who identify as a part of two or more races.

== Sports ==
MGHS sports teams are nicknamed the Silver Eagles and compete in the South division of the Badger Conference. The Silver Eagles American football team won state championships in football in 1977, 1984 and 2013. The boys' swimming team won state titles in 2013, 2015, 2016, 2017 and 2018. MGHS won a state championship in boys' cross country in 1959.

=== Athletic conference affiliation history ===
- Badger Conference (1956–present)

== Performing arts ==
MGHS has two competitive show choirs, the mixed-gender varsity Silver Connection and the girls-only junior varsity Silver Dimension. The choirs host an annual show choir competition, the Silver Stage Invitational.

== Notable alumni ==
- Richard Nelson (1959), American cultural anthropologist and writer (born: 1 December 1941, died: 4 November 2019).
- Andy North (1968), professional golfer and twice U.S. Open champion, ESPN golf analyst.
- Jeff Skiles (1977), co-pilot of US Airways flight 1549.
- Pete Waite (1977), former University of Wisconsin volleyball coach.
- Jessie Vetter (2004), goalkeeper for the USA women's ice hockey team.
- Gabe Carimi (2006), NFL guard for the Atlanta Falcons, Chicago Bears, and Tampa Bay Buccaneers
