= Stoughton High School (Wisconsin) =

School in Stoughton, Wisconsin, US

Location
- 600 Lincoln Ave. Stoughton, Wisconsin, Dane
- Coordinates: 42.9235°N 89.2351°W

Information
- School district: Stoughton Area School District
- Principal: Cassie Jemilo
- Teaching staff: 61.98 (FTE)
- Grades: 9-12
- Enrollment: 864 (2023–2024)
- Student to teacher ratio: 13.94
- Color
- Mascot: Viking
- Rival: Oregon High School
- Newspaper: The Norse Star
- Communities served: Stoughton, Cooksville
- Website: https://highschool.stoughton.k12.wi.us/

Stoughton High School is a public high school in Stoughton, Wisconsin. It is part of the Stoughton Area School District.

== Extracurricular activities ==
=== Athletics ===
Athletic teams include:

- Boys' and girls' cross country
- Boys' and girls' golf
- Boys' and girls' soccer
- Boys' and girls' swimming
- Boys' and girls' tennis
- Boys' and girls' basketball
- Boys' and girls' hockey
- Football
- Wrestling
- Volleyball
- Spirit squad
- Baseball
- Lacrosse
- Softball
- Track and field

==== Athletic conference affiliation history ====
- Rock River Valley League (1922-1928)
- Southern Six Conference (1928-1941)
- Southern Ten Conference (1941-1952)
- Badger Conference (1952–present)

=== Clubs and organizations ===
Student clubs and organizations include:

- Art club
- Badminton club
- Book club
- Chess/gaming club
- Environmental club
- Forensics
- German club
- GSA
- History-archaeology club
- Jazz band
- Key club
- Math team
- Mock trial
- NHS
- Student Newspaper (The Norse Star)
- Quiz bowl
- Science team
- Spanish club
- FFA
- Ultimate frisbee
- Yearbook

== Notable alumni ==
- Ella Giles Ruddy (1851–1917), author, editor
- Clairmont L. Egtvedt (1892–1975), an airplane designer and president and chairman of the Boeing Company
- James Allen Johnson (1924–2016), U.S. Army engineer and major general
- Russ Hellickson (1948 – ), amateur wrestler, collegiate wrestling coach, and Olympian
- Jack Nelson, college football offensive tackle for the Wisconsin Badgers

== See also ==
- List of high schools in Wisconsin
