= Oregon High School (Wisconsin) =

Location
- 456 N. Perry Pkwy; Oregon, WI, U.S. 42.93257°N 89.37209°W

Information
- Type: Public
- Established: 1969
- School district: Oregon School District
- Teaching staff: 90.67 (on an FTE basis)
- Grades: 9–12
- Enrollment: 1,284 (2023–2024)
- Student to teacher ratio: 14.16
- Colors: Orange and black
- Mascot: Panther
- Rival: Stoughton High School
- Communities served: Oregon, Fitchburg, Brooklyn
- Website: Oregon School District

Oregon High School (OHS) is a high school located in Oregon, Wisconsin in the United States. It is part of the Oregon School District. Student enrollment is 1233. It is a member of the Badger Conference. The current building was constructed in the 1960s to replace the original building built in 1922. OHS was later remodeled in 2017 including athletic facilities and an academic wing.

== Athletics ==
Oregon's athletic teams are called the Panthers, and the school has been affiliated with the Badger Conference since 1977.

=== Athletic conference affiliation history ===
- Madison Suburban Conference (1926-1969)
- Central Suburban Conference (1969-1977)
- Badger Conference (1977-present)

== Notable alumni ==
Graduation class noted in parentheses.

- Dave Ahrens (1977), professional football player
- Micah Alberti, model and actor
- Kevin J. Anderson (1980), science fiction author
- Brittyn Fleming (2017), professional ice hockey player
- Shaka Smart (1995), head basketball coach for the Marquette Golden Eagles
- Homer A. Stone (1885), Wisconsin State Representative, farmer, and businessman
- Lisa Stone (1980), head basketball coach for the Saint Louis Billikens and Wisconsin Badgers
