= Baraboo High School =

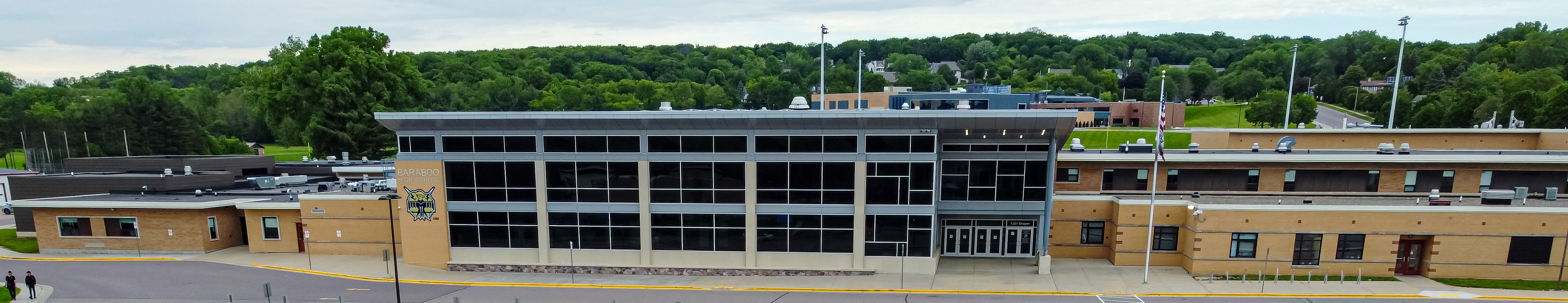

Location
- 1201 Draper St; Baraboo, Sauk County, WI 53913-1299; United States
- 43.4770°N 89.7562°W

Information
- School type: Public high school
- School board: 7
- School district: Baraboo School District
- NCES District ID: 5500810
- Superintendent: Rainey L. Briggs
- School code: WI-0280-0040
- CEEB code: 500140
- NCES School ID: 550081000103
- Principal: Steve Considine
- Teaching staff: 64.04 (on an FTE basis)
- Grades: 9–12
- Enrollment: 935 (2023-2024)
- Student to teacher ratio: 14.60
- Campus type: Town: Distant
- Color
- Slogan: Baraboo Proud
- Athletics conference: Badger Conference
- Nickname: Thunderbirds
- USNWR ranking: 5,523
- School fees: $25
- Feeder schools: Jack Young Middle School
- Website: www.baraboo.k12.wi.us/o/high

Baraboo High School is a public high school in Baraboo, Wisconsin, United States, part of the Baraboo School District. It serves 917 students in grades 9–12 from Baraboo, West Baraboo, North Freedom, and a portion of Lake Delton.

== History ==
=== Early history ===
When the City of Baraboo first established a public school district, it was solely within the city, charging tuition for students living in West Baraboo and other surrounding areas. In 1869, Baraboo's first school facility made of brick, a French Second Empire-style building with a cost of about $33,000, including the furniture, opened on Second Street, with Ash and Oak on each side; this became Baraboo High School. Because Baraboo lacked railroad service, the school building bricks were made in Baraboo. The school installed fire escapes shortly after it completed construction. According to the Sauk County Historical Society, the school building was "overcrowded" by 1906. The community criticized the perceived lack of safety and overcrowding.

=== 1900s ===
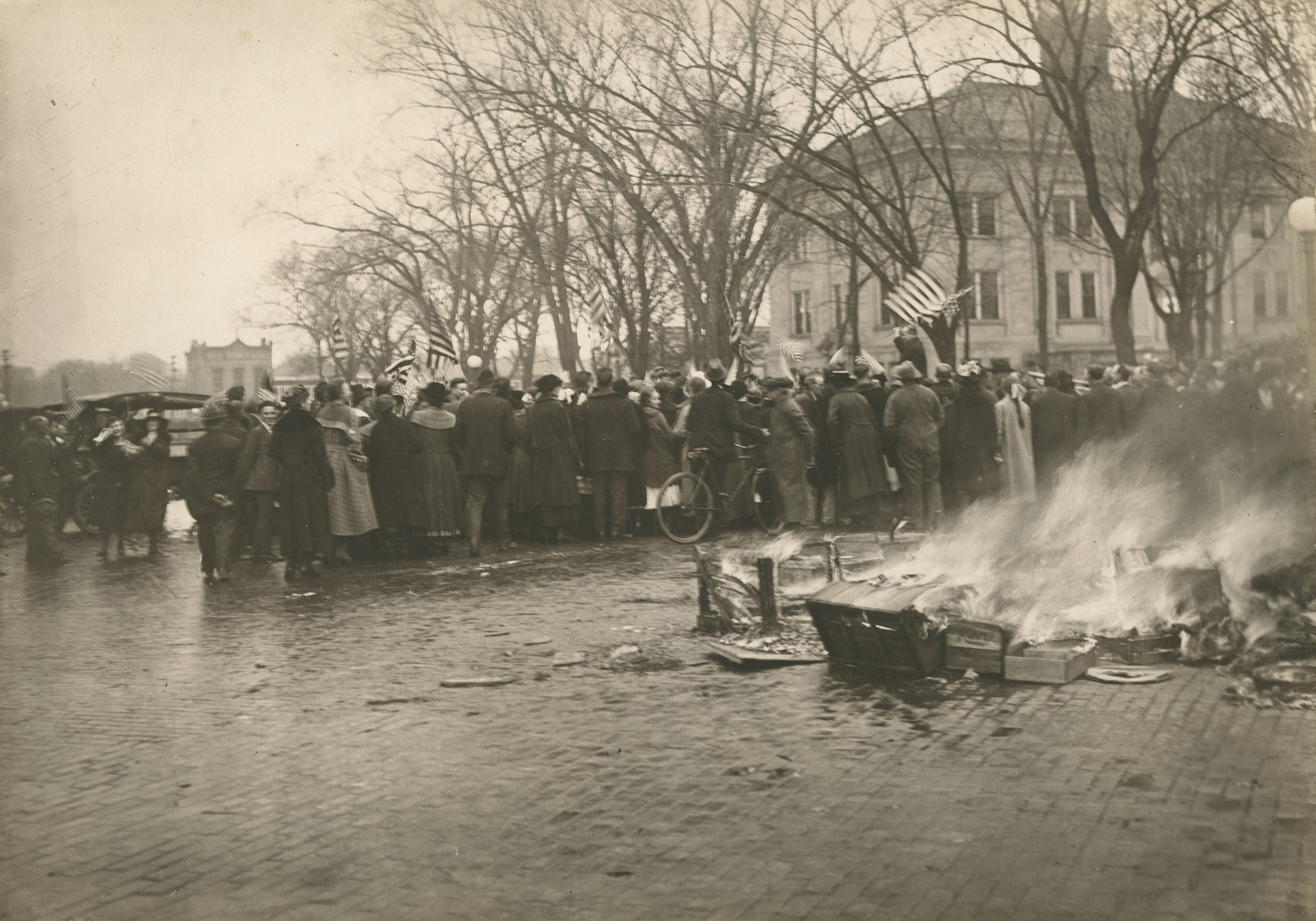
A pile of German textbooks from the Baraboo High School burning on a street in Baraboo, Wisconsin during an anti-German demonstration

A February 9, 1906 fire destroyed the building; no deaths occurred. The fire did not spread to other structures because the school constructed a brick building. Students and staff salvaged supplies from the first floor, while the fire destroyed much of the content on the upper floors. Several days after the fire, the building collapsed and was later demolished. The school utilized various facilities as temporary classrooms as it constructed a new building. In fifteen months, the Baraboo High fire was the third major fire.

In September 1907 a new three story, 164 feet (50 m) by 128 feet (39 m) red brick building opened. The new building had electronic bells, clocks, fire alarms, lighting, and a connection from the school administration to public safety services. Construction occurred for about a year before the opening. Shortly after the opening, some plaster ceilings collapsed; the building was temporarily closed, and the school replaced the ceilings.

Circa 1918, the school board unanimously canceled German language classes. Later, student protesters burned German textbooks, either as part of World War I anti-German sentiment or against the difficulty of the classes.

By the period before 1928, Baraboo High School occupied one of two buildings on the block of 311 Ash Street; Baraboo's junior high school occupied the other, with both sharing a heating system.

In 1928, the school began constructing a new high school campus at 124 Second Street. It was designed by Claude and Starck of Madison, Wisconsin and funded by $225,000. It opened in 1929. The school demolished the previous junior high building at 311 Ash Street, moving the junior high school into the former senior high school building and later demolishing it circa 1960. In 1938 an underground passage was built between 124 2nd and 311 Ash.

The Sauk County Historical Society stated, "By the late 1950s, it was again apparent that the Baraboo High School building was not big enough for the growing number of students." In the 1950s, the district twice proposed levies to fund the construction of a new high school building, but voters rejected both proposals. In 1961, the school built a new building, in the periphery of Baraboo, for $1,719,278. This occurred after the city council decided, in September 1960, to have an advisory referendum held on November 8, 1960 on where to locate the school. The board chose a site on Draper Street, on land donated by the Draper family, though a plurality of voters preferred the Broadway site. The district boundaries expanded in 1961–1962, so areas previously paying tuition no longer had to.

The 124 Second Street building initially became the new junior high school. 124 Second Street became the Baraboo Civic Center in 1979, after a new junior high building opened that year. The Civic Center building is a part of the Downtown Baraboo Historic District, listed on the National Register of Historic Places on June 8, 2015.

=== 2000s ===
Around 2015, a parking lot and roof were being renovated, while an office was demolished by June. As of 2018, a renovation program was underway; it was funded by a bond approved by 58% of the voters on November 8, 2016. Groundbreaking occurred on June 7, 2017. Eppstein Uhen Architects was responsible for the renovations, which included a new fitness facility, fire sprinkler systems, temperature control infrastructure, and the following expanded facilities: art facilities, cafeteria, and a commons, a family and consumer education area, a physical education areas, and a technical education area. In addition, the library and student services area were to be renovated. The renovations began on the west side of the school and then went to other portions when that area was complete; that way, classes could be held around the renovation schedule. The renovations cost $22 million. The expected completion date of the west side was spring 2018, and the overall scheduled completion date was August 2018; a ribbon-cutting ceremony for the newly-renovated school was scheduled for August 29, 2018.

In November 2018, a photograph of students raising their hands in a Nazi salute was shared on social media. The photographer who took the picture claimed that his instruction to the students was, "OK boys, you're going to say goodbye to your parents. So wave." One of the students photographed, who did not raise his hand, stated, "He did not say raise your hand in a Nazi symbol way. And I'm pretty sure my classmates just interpreted as raise your hand, let's do this as a joke." When asked if he knew what that gesture meant, another student present at the time stated, "No. Nobody knew what it was." An unnamed former Baraboo High student quoted in an article published in The Independent claimed that individuals pictured in the photograph openly used racial epithets in school, and upon reporting this behavior, the school administration failed to take action against them. The photo was condemned by the Auschwitz Memorial, State Senator Jon Erpenbach, and Wisconsin Governor-elect Tony Evers. School District Administrator Lori M. Mueller issued a statement that "the photo of students posted to #BarabooProud is not reflective of the educational values and beliefs of the School District of Baraboo. The District will pursue any and all available and appropriate actions, including legal, to address." On November 21, in a letter to parents, Mueller said the involved students are protected by the First Amendment from punishment by the district.

In September 2021, the district settled a lawsuit from a former student alleging sexual assault and racial discrimination for $862,500.

During the June 2024 graduation ceremony, the father of a graduate rushed onto the stage to prevent his daughter from shaking the hand of the superintendent, who is black.

== Extracurricular activities ==
Athletics include:

- Boys and Girls basketball
- Boys and Girls soccer
- Baseball
- Football
- Boys and Girls hockey
- Boys and Girls cross country
- Girls volleyball
- Wrestling
- Softball
- Boys and Girls swimming
- Gymnastics
- Boys and Girls track and field
- Boys and Girls tennis

In 2017, six tennis courts at the high school were dilapidated due to soil conditions, with two severely damaged courts. At that time, the district was discussing with University of Wisconsin–Baraboo/Sauk County (UW-Baraboo) the possibility of having new tennis courts built on the college property with the district sharing the courts.

The Baraboo High marching band has participated in the Great Circus Parade, typically wearing clown outfits. As of 2016 the marching band had been there every year it was held.

=== Conference affiliation history ===
- South Central Conference (1926-1941)
- Southern Ten Conference (1941-1952)
- South Central Conference (1952-2001)
- Badger Conference (2001–present)

== Notable alumni ==
- Sheryl Albers, American politician
- Donald R. Atkinson, American counseling psychologist and professor
- Tiny Cahoon, American football player
- John V. Diener, American politician
- Mike Reinfeldt, American football player
- Terry Stieve, American football player

== See also ==
- List of high schools in Wisconsin
