= Brodhead High School =

Location
- 2501 W. 5th Ave. Brodhead, Wisconsin; United States; 42.60615°N 89.38404°W

Information
- Type: Public high school
- School district: Brodhead School District
- Principal: Jim Matthys
- Teaching staff: 23.79 (FTE)
- Grades: 9–12
- Enrollment: 322 (2023-2024)
- Student to teacher ratio: 13.54
- Campus: Suburban
- Color
- Mascot: Cardinal
- Website: https://www.brodhead.k12.wi.us/schools/high/

Brodhead High School is a high school located in Brodhead, Wisconsin, United States. It serves students from the Brodhead community.

== Athletics ==
Brodhead is a member of the Rock Valley Conference.

Its athletics teams are known as the Cardinals, and its mascot is a cardinal named Charlie.

=== Football ===
Brodhead combines with the Juda School District for football and wrestling. The Cardinals have earned eight Rock Valley Conference championships, 25 consecutive playoff appearances, three state semi-final appearances and two state runner-ups.

=== Volleyball ===
The Lady Cardinals have won six conference championships and have made one appearance at the state tournament.

=== Softball ===
- 2004 state champions

=== Track ===
- Two men's state championships

== Music programs ==
The Brodhead band performs at the home football, basketball, and volleyball games. They perform a series of concerts throughout the year.

Brodhead also fields two competitive show choirs, an all-woman group named BHS Express, and a mixed group named Guys and Dolls. Both choirs compete around southeast Wisconsin every winter.

== Controversy ==
Brodhead High School was involved in controversy in late October 2016 over a safety drill on driving. The school made a public morning announcement that four students had died that morning in a car crash. Those students, who were alive, were not allowed to use their cell phones to inform fellow students that it was part of a drill. Later, the school made a second announcement that the students were alive and that this had been a simulation drill. Additional announcements were made during the day about more students dying in crashes that did not actually happen.

== Notable alumni ==
- Jim Meyer, former offensive tackle for the Cleveland Browns and the Green Bay Packers
