= Viroqua High School =

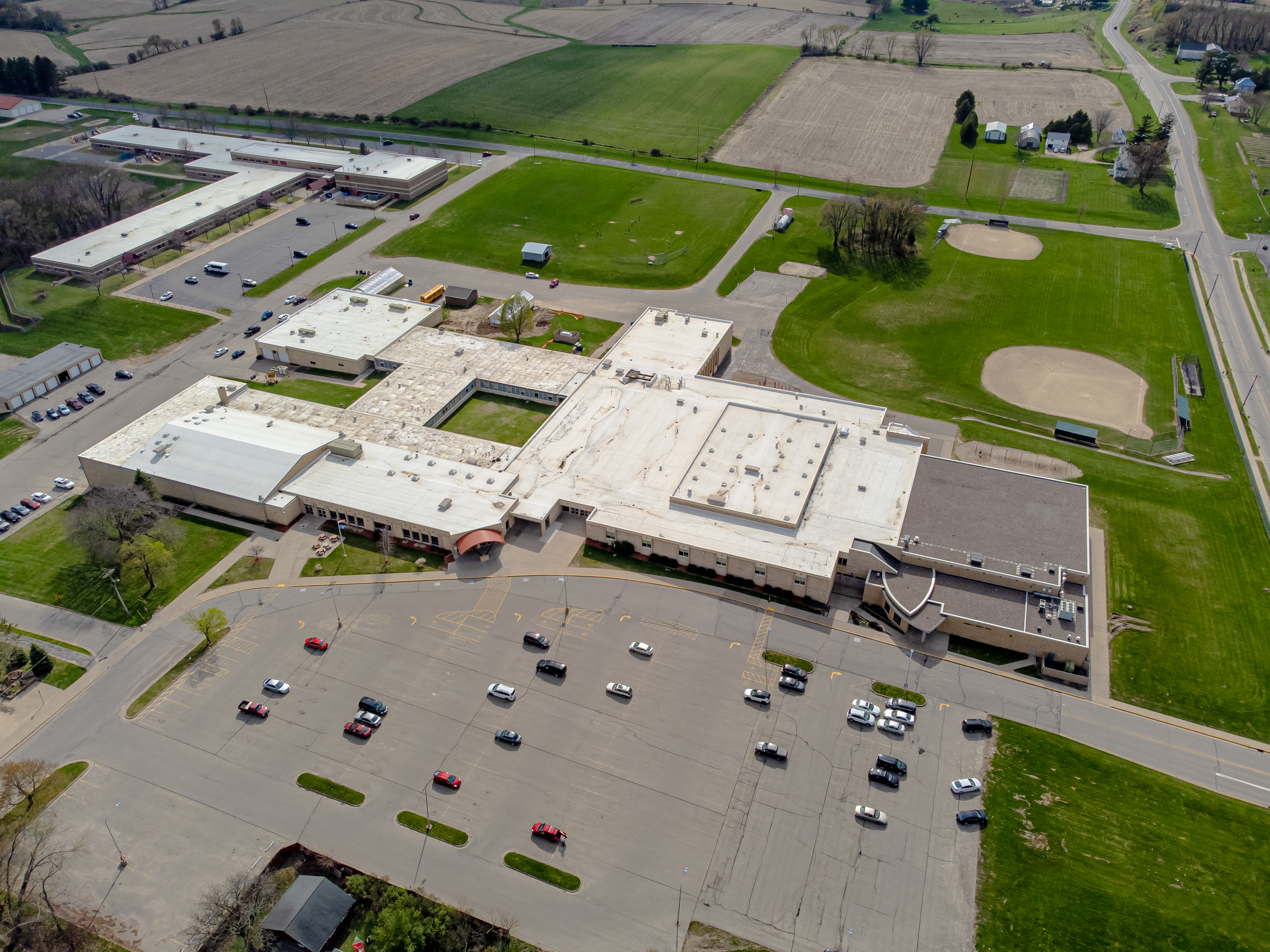
- Viroqua High School, 2010

Location
- 100 Blackhawk Drive, Viroqua, WI, 54665; United States
- Coordinates: 43.5588°N 90.9009°W

Information
- Teaching staff: 23.90 (FTE)
- Grades: 9-12
- Enrollment: 301 (2023-2024)
- Student to teacher ratio: 12.59
- Color
- Mascot: Blackhawk

Viroqua High School is a public high school in Viroqua, Vernon County, Wisconsin as a part of the Viroqua Area School district.

Viroqua High serves about 334 students, grades 9-12, and offers a variety of co-curricular sports and activities that include student council, cheerleading, cross country, football, golf, tennis, volleyball, basketball, gymnastics, hockey, wrestling, baseball, softball, and track and field.

Students at Viroqua High can take Advanced Placement courses and exams. The rate of participation for AP course work is currently 23 percent.

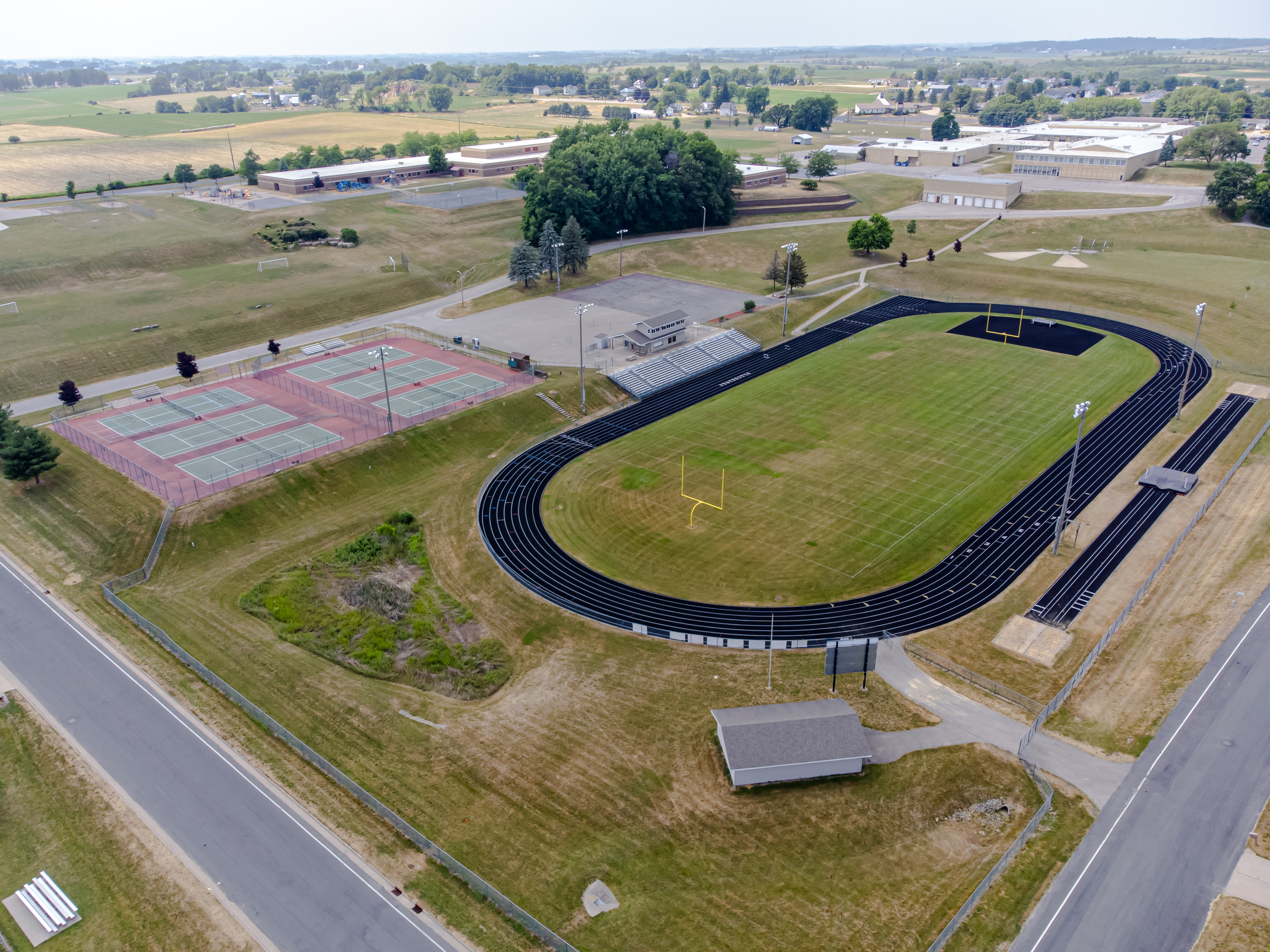
Viroqua athletic fields

== History ==
The initial educational establishment in Viroqua began with a school taught by Mrs. Margaret C. Terhune in an old log courthouse during the late summer and fall of 1851. This school, which started shortly after the arrival of Mrs. Terhune and her husband W. F. Terhune, had approximately sixteen students. It operated for about three months on a subscription basis, costing $2 per student. Judge Terhune subsequently taught at the same location during the winter of 1851-1852. The following summer, Jennie Clark (later Mrs. Messersmith) took over as the teacher.

For about two years, this log building served as the school, after which classes were held in various rented rooms until 1856. That year, following the formation of a school district, a two-room frame schoolhouse was built opposite Warren Dunlap's residence. It was considered spacious for its time. Teachers including R. C. Bierce, C. M. Butt, L. M. Perham, O. C. Smith, Mr. Moore, T. B. Brown, and A. D. Chase taught there until 1868, when a new building was constructed and the old one was sold and eventually converted into a dwelling.

The new school building, erected in 1868, was a large stone structure located a few blocks east of the town's center. Viroqua High School was established in 1876, and in 1882, a brick building was erected for the high and grammar schools at a cost of $2,400. The lower grades continued to use the stone building. By 1882-83, both buildings were updated with new furnaces for improved heating and ventilation. The school grounds were noted for their extensive landscaping and variety of trees.

In 1883, the Viroqua High School staff included C. J. Smith as principal, Lona Washburn as assistant, and teachers across various departments such as Emma F. Howell, Hattie E. Terrell, Eliza Haughton, Ida B. Coe, and Hattie McRie. The school board at that time comprised R. S. McMichael (Director), H. A. Chase (Clerk), and Earl M. Rogers (Treasurer), with a graduation committee including O. B. Wyman, William Haughton, and C. J. Smith.

In 1999, Laurel High School, a charter school was formed. During the 2008-2009 school year, the school was moved from the Western Technical College Building to the Viroqua High School building.

In 2018, A $36.8 million referendum to provide facility improvements failed.

In 2022, Voters approved a $20.5 million dollar referendum to provide facility improvements.

== Notable alumni ==
- Andrew H. Dahl, member of the Wisconsin State Assembly from 1899 to 1901 and 1903 to 1907.
- Mark C. Lee, former NASA astronaut who flew on four Space Shuttle missions, graduated in 1970.
- Loren Oldenburg, member of the Wisconsin State Assembly since 2019.
- David Roth, opera director
- Jill Soltau, former CEO of JCPenney.
- Butch Vig, musician, songwriter, and record producer.
