= University of Wisconsin High School =

Defunct high school in Wisconsin, United States

The University of Wisconsin High School was a public high school in Madison, Wisconsin, originally encompassing 7–12th grades. It opened September 1914 in a building erected for that purpose. The school was created and maintained by the University of Wisconsin–Madison as part of its teacher education program, for educational experimentation and for observation and practice teaching.

When the school opened, students in the lower years did not have typical seventh and eighth grade work, but the beginnings of high school work. They were under the same general regulations and discipline as older pupils.

The last graduating class received their diplomas on June 4, 1964. The building then was used by the UW School of Journalism, followed by the UW School of Social Work. In 1993 an all-class reunion was held, and shortly after demolition began to allow for the construction of a genetics research building on the site.

== Notable alumni ==
- John Bardeen – scientist who was twice awarded the Nobel Prize
- Joseph Wheeler Bloodgood – Wisconsin State Assembly
- Uta Hagen – actress
- John Carrier Weaver – educator, UW president, 1971–77
- Deborah Mitchell Dryden - costume designer
