= Fort Atkinson High School =

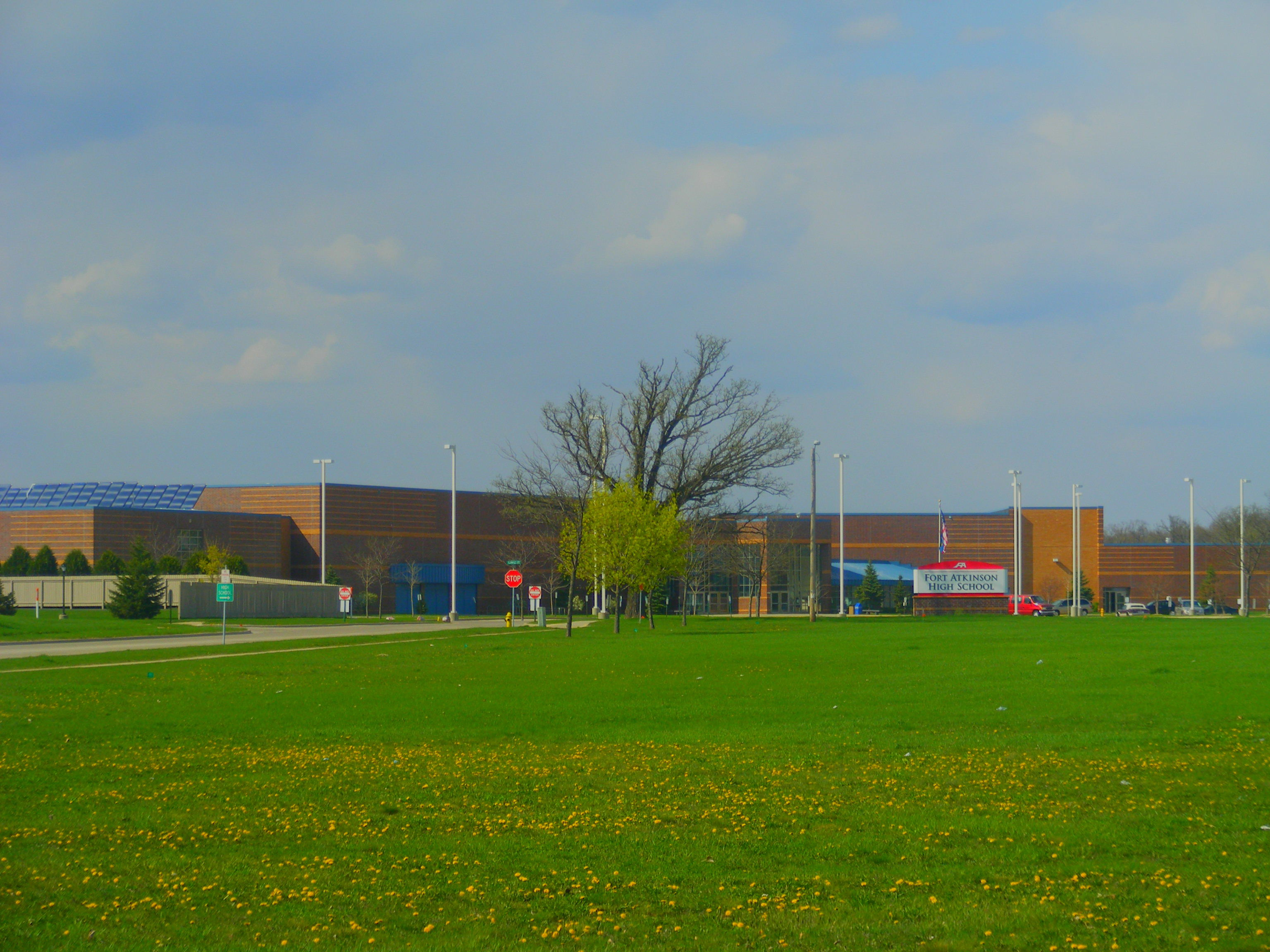

Location
- 925 Lexington Blvd. Fort Atkinson, Wisconsin 53538-1092; 42.9436°N 88.8579°W

Information
- School district: Fort Atkinson School District
- Superintendent: Rob Abbott
- Principal: Leigh Ann Scheuerell
- Teaching staff: 57.75 (FTE)
- Grades: 9–12
- Enrollment: 876 (2023–2024)
- Student to teacher ratio: 15.17
- Colors: Red, black, and white
- Mascot: Blackhawk
- Website: www.fortschools.org

Fort Atkinson High School is a public high school in Fort Atkinson, Wisconsin. It is part of the Fort Atkinson School District.

== History ==
Fort Atkinson High School was founded in 1866, and its first principal was John Purdy. The original school building was destroyed in a fire in 1888. The high school has been housed in a number of buildings since.

== Extracurricular activities ==
=== Athletics ===
- Boys' and girls' cross country
- Boys' and girls' track
- Boys' and girls' soccer
- Boys' and girls' tennis
- Boys' and girls' swim
- Boys' and girls' basketball
- Boys' and girls' volleyball
- Boys' and girls' golf
- Baseball
- Softball
- Wrestling
- Football
- Cheerleading/spirit squad
- Esports League

=== Clubs and organizations ===
Student clubs and organizations include:

- Archery
- Art league
- Chess club
- FFA
- Fort Atkinson chapter of the National Speech and Debate Association
- Forensics
- French club
- FBLA
- German club
- History club
- Math club
- NHS
- Spanish club
- VICA

Fort Atkinson has two competitive show choirs, the mixed-gender South High Street Singers and the women's-only Lexington Singers. The school also hosts its own competition, the Fort Atkinson Showcase.

The Fort Atkinson Debate Team is led by English teacher Dan Hansen, the team competes from October to late January every year, but practice starts in September. The team was founded in 2016 and has eleven members as of December 2025. The team has seen great success over the years (listed below).

- In the 2017-2018 season, debaters from Fort were State Finalists.
- In the 2018-2019 season, debaters from Fort were state Semifinalists
- In the 2019-2020 season, debaters from Fort were State Finalists.
- In the 2021-2022 season, debaters from Fort were state Semifinalists.
- In the 2022-2023 season, debaters from Fort were State Finalists.
- In the 2023-2024 season, debaters from Fort were State finalists.
- In the 2024-2025 season, debaters from Fort WON the State title with an undefeated record.

== Notable alumni ==
- Kyle Borland, former professional football player
- Drew Evans, professional football player for the Indiana Hoosiers
- Randall S. Knox, former member of the Wisconsin State Assembly.
- Milton Lorman, former member of the Wisconsin State Assembly.
- Keith Neubert, former professional football player
- John Offerdahl, former professional football player
- Charles A. Snover
- David Ward, former politician

== See also ==
- List of high schools in Wisconsin
