= Monroe High School (Wisconsin) =

Location
- 1600 26th Street; Monroe, Wisconsin 53566; United States
- Coordinates: 42°35′13.2″N 89°38′22.5″W

Information
- Other name: MHS
- Type: Public high school
- School district: School District of Monroe
- NCES School ID: 550984001298
- Principal: Jeriamy Jackson
- Teaching staff: 53.15 (on an FTE basis)
- Grades: 9–12
- Enrollment: 710 (2023-2024)
- Student to teacher ratio: 13.36
- Colors: Crimson and white
- Athletics conference: Rock Valley Conference
- Mascot: Mouse
- Nickname: Cheesemakers
- Website: www.monroeschools.com/about-us-home

Monroe High School (MHS) is a public high school in Monroe, Wisconsin, United States. It is part of the School District of Monroe.

== Athletics ==
The school won state championships in boys' cross country in 1973, 1974 and 1979.

== Notable alumni ==
- Ken Behring, real estate developer
- Brett Davis, politician
- David G. Deininger, Wisconsin judge and state representative
- Nathan J. Lindsay, United States Air Force major general and astronaut
- Ric Mathias, NFL player
