= Reedsburg Municipal Hospital =

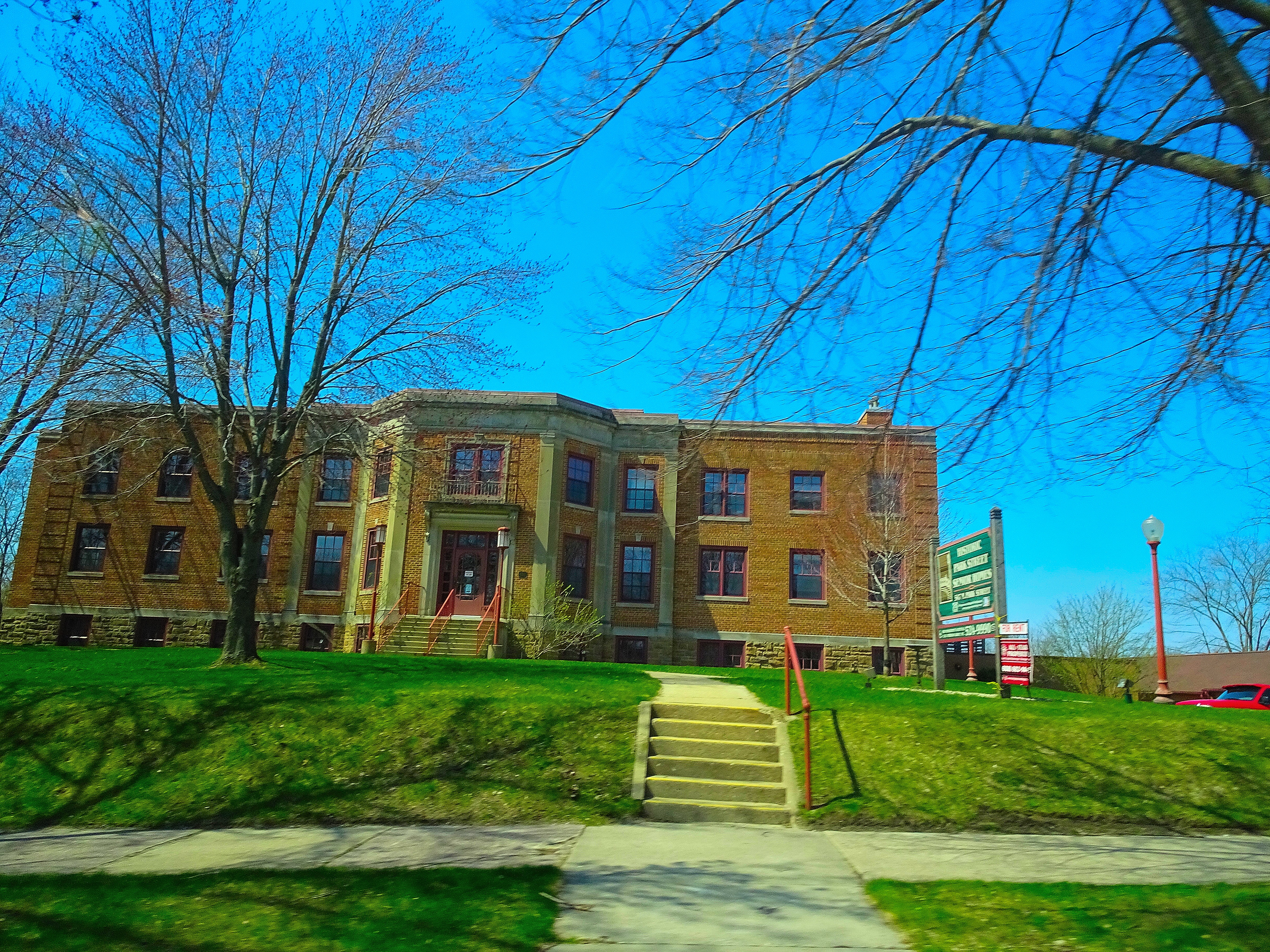

General information
- Architectural style: Georgian Revival
- Address: 547 North Park Street
- Town or city: Reedsburg, Wisconsin
- Country: United States
- Opened: 1933
- Renovated: 1996

Design and construction
- Architect(s): Frank S. Moulton

The Reedsburg Municipal Hospital is a historic hospital built in 1933 in the city of Reedsburg, Wisconsin. It was used as a medical facility from 1933 until 1996, after which, it was remodeled into senior apartments.

== History ==
Reedsburg Municipal Hospital was designed by Frank Moulton of Flad & Moulton (current day Flad Architects), in 1933. He also designed South School. The hospital was built in the Georgian Revival style. Reedsburg Municipal Hospital served as the hospital for the city of Reedsburg from 1933 until 1976, when it was replaced by a new hospital building. The building continued to be used as a facility for drug and alcohol abuse victims, alongside people with developmental disabilities. In 1996 the building was closed, and was going to be torn down. This was highly unpopular, and with strong local support, the hospital was saved from demolition. A developer bought the building and remodeled the interior, making 24 senior apartments. A garage building was added during the remodel. The Reedsburg Municipal Hospital is a part of the Park Street Historic District.
