= Sorge =

Sorge may refer to:

== Places ==
- Sorge, Saxony-Anhalt, Germany, a village and former municipality
- Sorge (Eider) in Schleswig-Holstein, Germany, a tributary of the Eider River
- Sorge (Lake Geneva) in Lausanne, a tributary of Lake Geneva
- German name of the Dzierzgoń (river) in Poland
- Sorge Island, Antarctica

== People ==
- Albert O. Sorge (1881–1967), American politician
- Friedrich Sorge (1826–1906), German communist and later American labor activist
- Georg Andreas Sorge (1703–1778), organist, composer and music theorist
- Giuseppe Sorge (1857–1937), Italian historian, prefect and director of the public security
- Gustav Sorge (1911–1978), SS concentration camp guard
- Henry W. Sorge (1862–1921), American politician
- Kurt Sorge (born 1988), freeride mountain biker
- Reinhard Sorge (1892–1916), German dramatist and poet
- Richard Sorge (1895–1944), Soviet intelligence officer in Nazi Germany and Imperial Japan
- Samuel Sorge (born 1977), birth name of German hip hop artist Samy Deluxe
- Santo Sorge (1908–1972), Sicilian Mafia leader
- Sarah Sorge (born 1969), German politician
- Soleil Sorge (born 1994), Italian-American model, television presenter, television personality and showgirl
- Tino Sorge (born 1975), German politician

== Other uses ==
- Sorge, or "care", a concept in Heidegger's philosophy

== See also ==
- Sorges, a commune in France
- Sorger, a surname
