= Main Street Commercial Historic District (Reedsburg, Wisconsin) =

Historic district in Wisconsin, United States

- U.S. National Register of Historic Places
- U.S. Historic district
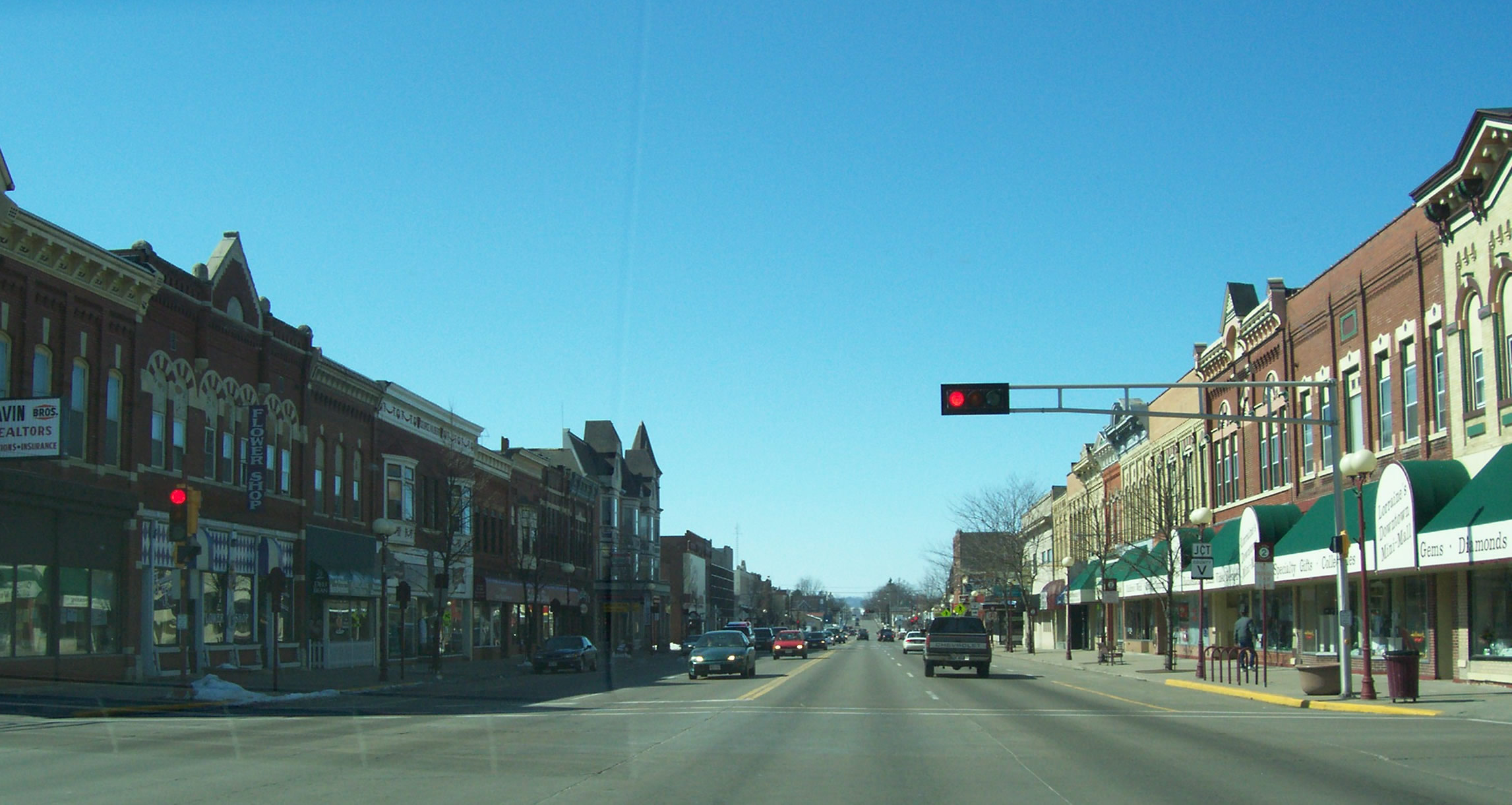

- Location within Wisconsin Location within the United States
- Location: Roughly bounded by N. Park, S. Park, N. Walnut, and S. Walnut Sts. on Main St., Reedsburg, Wisconsin
- Coordinates: 43°31′57″N 90°0′25″W
- Built: 1874
- Architectural style: Late Victorian
- MPS: Reedsburg MRA
- NRHP reference No.: 84000654
- Added to NRHP: December 26, 1984

Main Street Commercial Historic District is a historic district in Reedsburg, Wisconsin that was listed on the National Register of Historic Places in 1984. It was listed alongside the Park Street Historic District. The district consists of 21 commercial buildings. Eighteen of the buildings are brick and three are of stone construction.

== History ==
=== Early history ===
Main Street began as "Shanty Row", consisting of five tamarack shanties built in 1850. Over the next 10 years, the shanties were either destroyed or removed, and Main Street took their place. The Chicago & North Western Railway (C&NW) arrived in 1872, bringing with it many businesses and industries. One of the most important was the Reedsburg Woolen Mill, which was built in 1882 along the Baraboo River.

== See also ==
- Beastro & Barley (City Hotel)
- National Register of Historic Places listings in Sauk County, Wisconsin
