= Park Street Historic District =

Historic district in Wisconsin, United States

- U.S. National Register of Historic Places
- U.S. Historic district
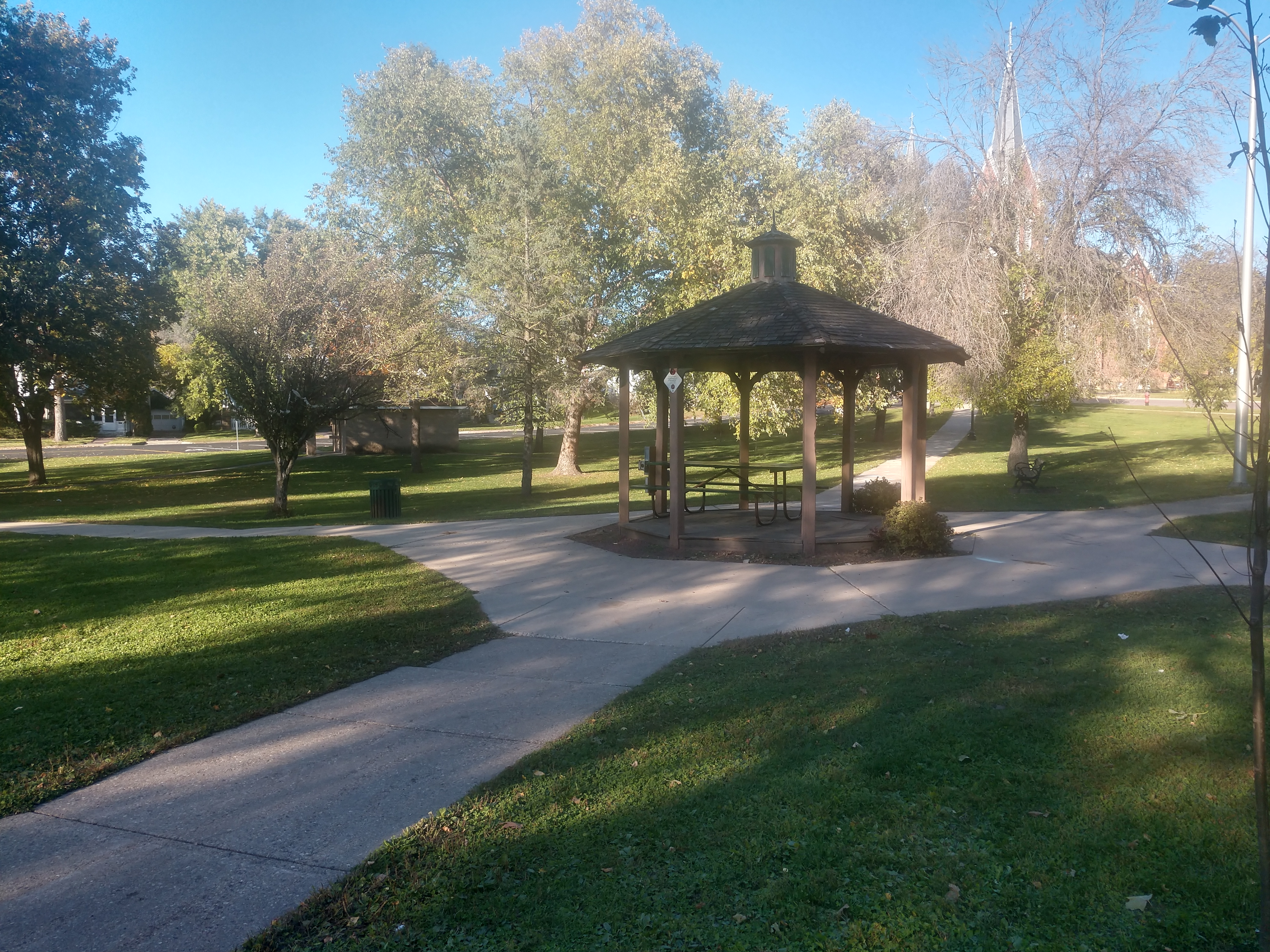
- Location: Roughly bounded by 6th, Locust, N. Pine and Main Sts., Reedsburg (Sauk), Wisconsin. on N. Park Street, Reedsburg, Wisconsin
- Built: 1870
- Architectural style: Late 19th and 20th Century Revival, Late Victorian
- MPS: Reedsburg MRA
- NRHP reference No.: 84000656
- Added to NRHP: December 26, 1984

Park Street Historic District is a historic district in Reedsburg, Wisconsin that was listed on the National Register of Historic Places in 1984. It was listed alongside the Main Street Commercial Historic District.

It consists of 44 properties located primarily along North Park Street, and surrounding City Park. Several architectural styles are present, including Italianate, Queen Anne, Colonial Revival, and Late Victorian. Most buildings are single family homes, with 3 churches, and the former Reedsburg Municipal Hospital, which now houses apartments.

== History ==
City Park was founded in 1848, after being donated by early settler David C. Reed. By 1850 there were about 20 homes in this area, and the street was nicknamed "Prospect Hill." Most of these early homes were torn down, and none still stand. The earliest remaining homes were built in the 1870s, two examples include the Edward M. Hackett House, and the Abner L. Harris House. In 1906, the Presbyterian Church was built, and in 1908 St. Peter's Lutheran Church was built; the churches are on opposite corners of City Park. In 1932 the Reedsburg Municipal Hospital was built on North Park Street.
