= Copper Creek =

Copper Creek can refer to several streams:

- Copper Creek (Valdez-Cordova Borough, Alaska) (several with that name)
- Copper Creek (Denali Borough, Alaska)
- Copper Creek (Washington)
- Copper Creek (Wisconsin), a stream in Sauk County
