= South School (Reedsburg, Wisconsin) =

Historic school building in Reedsburg, US

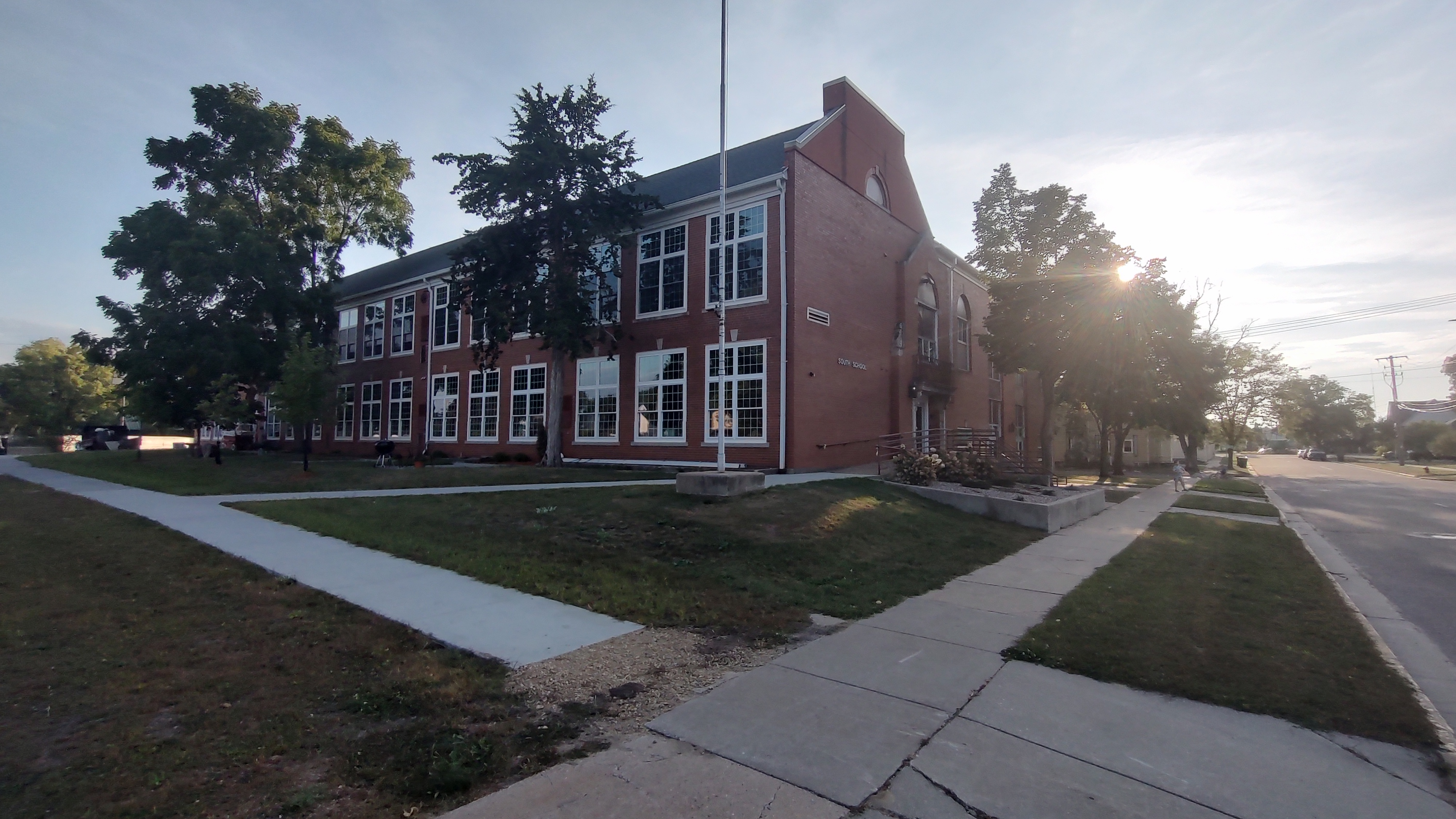
- South School in 2023
- Interactive map of the South School area
- Alternative names: South Elementary School South School Estates

General information
- Architectural style: Colonial Revival
- Location: 420 Plum Street, WI 53959, Reedsburg, Wisconsin, United States
- Coordinates: 43.5300°N 90.0047°W
- Construction started: 1936
- Opened: 1937
- Renovated: 2023

Technical details
- Floor count: 2

Design and construction
- Architect: Frank Moulton W.P.A.

Other information
- Number of units: 11

South School is a historic school building in the city of Reedsburg, Wisconsin. It was designed by Frank Moulton in the Colonial Revival style, and built in 1937. South School served over 250 students every year in the School District of Reedsburg, until it was closed in 2019. In 2023, the building finished renovations into an 11-unit apartment building. The gym and a playground are now public space for the community.

== Description ==
South School is located at 420 Plum Street in Reedsbug, Wisconsin. The building measures 110 by 175 feet (34 by 53 m). The school is built in the Colonial Revival style with a brick exterior.

South School has a combined gymnasium and auditorium. The gym measures 48 by 40 feet (15 by 12 m). Adjacent to the gym is a stage. In the basement of South School was a cafeteria called the Pine Room. School lunch was served here for all nearby schools at noon.

== History ==
=== Original building ===
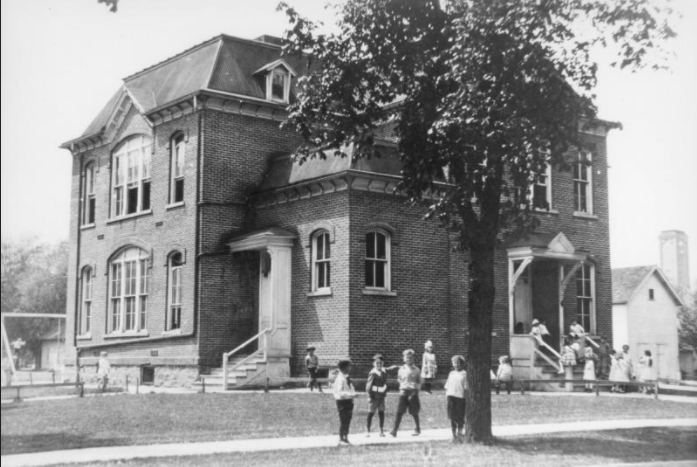
Old South School building in 1919.

The first grade school in Reedsburg was South School. It was built in 1889 on the northwest corner of Locust St. and Plum St., consisting of two large classrooms. Six years later an additional story was built, adding an extra two classrooms. Constructed would be handled by the Morgan Building Company. At the time, it was considered to be a modern schoolhouse, with its heating and ventilation system being praised. Starting in 1922, some classes would be held in the basement of the city library due to overcrowding. In the 1930s, the school was considered "inadequate" and a major fire hazard. The building would continue until it was razed in 1936. It would be replaced by tennis courts.

=== New building and mid-20th century ===
A new South School building would start construction in August 1936. It would be located on the southeast corner of Locust St. and Plum St. and would be significantly larger than the existing building. This new building was also called South School and it was designed by Frank Moulton, of Flad & Moulton, and partially funded by the Works Progress Administration. It would be finished in January 1937.

It served students from the east side of the Baraboo River.

With the completion of the new middle school building in 1968, South School became known as South Elementary School, as it was now only serving kindergarten through 5th grade.

In 1989 it was suggested to close South School and build a new school elsewhere. Despite the committee agreeing to the proposal, it did not go through.

=== Closure and reuse ===
Over the past few decades, many referendums have been proposed to close South School, but none had passed until 2017. Over this time, the building was remodeled, but the look of the school was maintained.

South School was added to the Wisconsin Register of Historic Places in 1983. The South School gym had been used to hold high school prom, among other events. In 2017, a referendum was held to close South School and build a new elementary school. The School District of Reedsburg made the decision to close the school after an overwhelming majority of people voted yes in the referendum. On June 11, 2019 the school officially closed. On April 27, 2020 the Reedsburg Common Council approved a proposal to convert South School into affordable housing. Today the building houses apartments and a commercial space. In this commercial space, Old School Pizza operates its frozen pizza business.
