= Hay Creek (Wisconsin) =

Stream in Sauk County, Wisconsin, U.S.

Coordinates: 43°32′12″N 90°00′56″W

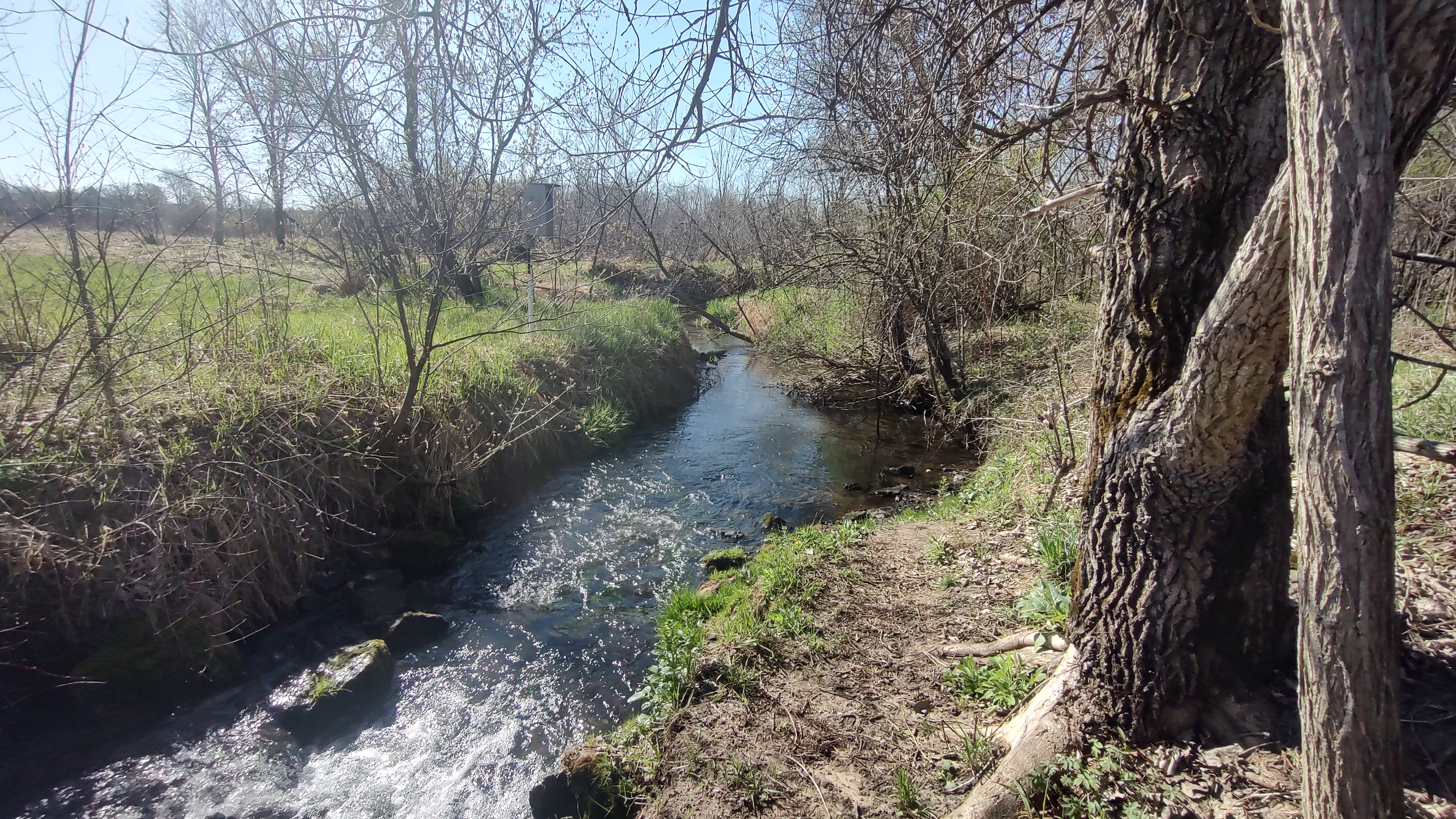
Hay Creek pictured in Reedsburg

Hay Creek is a stream in Sauk County, Wisconsin, in the United States. It joins the Baraboo River in Reedsburg, Wisconsin.

Hay Creek was named from the fact early settlers produced hay there.

== See also ==
- List of rivers of Wisconsin
