= Webb Middle School =

Webb Middle School may refer to:

- Webb Middle School - Austin Independent School District - Austin, Texas
- Cecil Webb Middle School - Garland Independent School District - Garland, Texas
- Webb Middle School - School District of Reedsburg - Reedsburg, Wisconsin
