= Reedsburg Woolen Mill =

- U.S. National Register of Historic Places
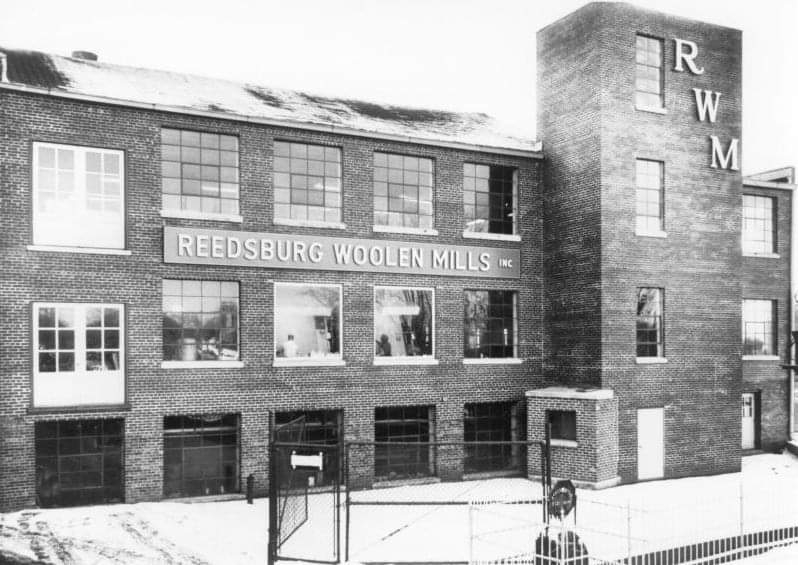
- Reedsburg Woolen Mill as of 1921
- Location: 26 Main St., Reedsburg, Wisconsin
- Coordinates: 43°31′56″N 90°00′40″W
- Area: less than one acre
- Built: 1891
- MPS: Reedsburg MRA
- NRHP reference No.: 84000664
- Added to NRHP: December 26, 1984

The Reedsburg Woolen Mill was a historic woolen mill along the Baraboo River in Reedsburg, Wisconsin. The woolen mill was the largest employer in Reedsburg for much of its life, employing over 200 people. The woolen mill was built in 1891 and lasted until 1968, when most of it burned down, leaving the office building intact. It was added to the National Register of Historic Places in 1984.

Today, the Reedsburg Woolen Mill Office building is used by DJ Dietz Designs and the Wormfarm Institute. A mural of the woolen mill building was painted in 2000, and it is placed on the side of the Reedsburg Woolen Mill Office building, facing the Baraboo River. The land where the mill once stood was redeveloped, and is currently home to a grocery store.

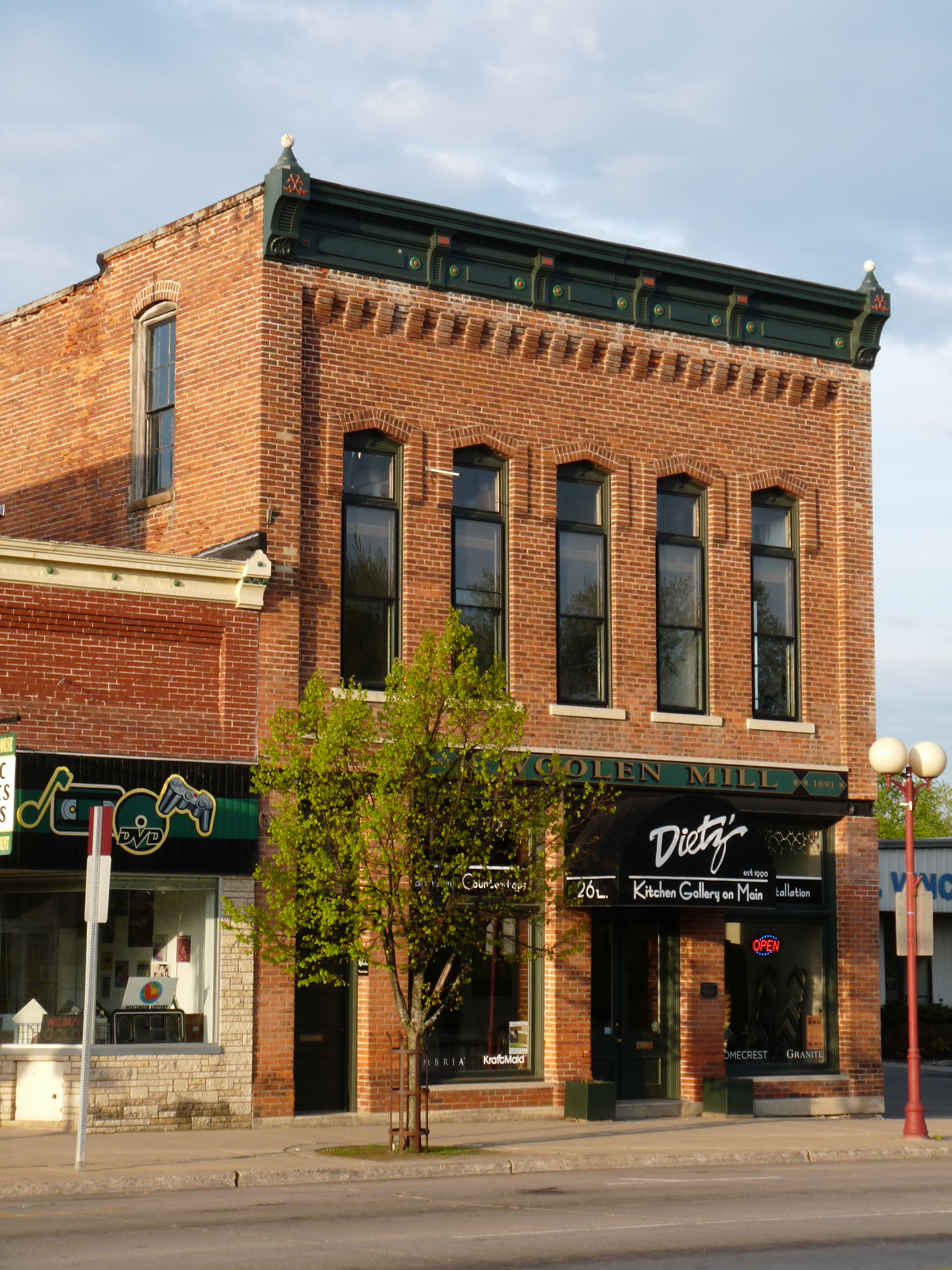
Reedsburg Woolen Mill Office

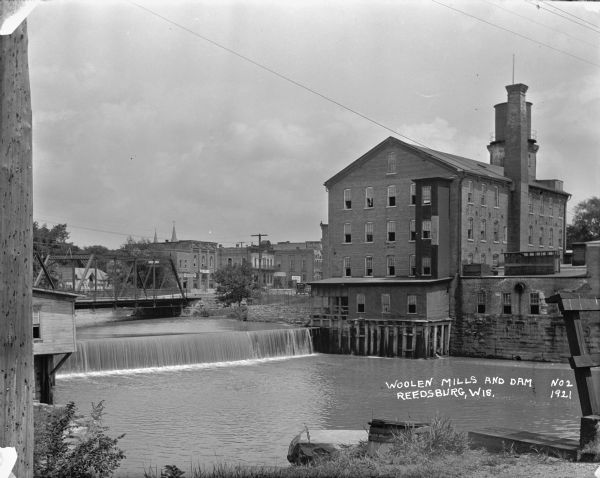
Reedsburg Woolen Mill from the Baraboo River.

== Early history ==
James Babb built a sawmill and dam on this location in 1842. This site was chosen, as the river was shallow in this spot, making it a good place for a dam. Five years later, David Reed purchased and rebuilt the dam and sawmill. In 1853, Joseph Mackey purchased the dam, bringing new businesses along with it. Over the years, interest in a woolen mill for the area grew. Local businessmen founded Reedsburg Woolen Mills in 1879, with $50,000.

By 1882, the Reedsburg Woolen Mill had been built. The building was expanded in the years following. By 1899, the Reedsburg Woolen Mill consisted of a 4-story building, complete with wool storage and 32 broad looms. The looms produced mainly "fancy cassimeres" for Chicago markets during this time. In 1902 the facility was bought by Appleton Woolen Mills. With this purchase, a new dam was built, and the facility was converted to electricity by 1910. In 1954, the woolen mill reorganized to emphasize novelty fabrics. After this change by Appleton Woolen Mills, the residents feared that the facility may be shut down.

== Late 1900s to present ==
The employees then bought back the building with the help of local businessmen. The woolen mill continued to be the city's largest employer, until it closed down in 1967, after the company declared bankruptcy. The building burned down in 1968. In 1973, the dam that once powered the woolen mill, was removed by the DNR, significantly changing the height of the Baraboo River in Reedsburg. Today only the woolen mill office building remains, and was listed on the National Register of Historic Places in 1984. A "picker" was discovered in the remains of the old woolen mill. It is currently on display at the site of the old Reedsburg Woolen Mill building.
