= School District of Reedsburg =

School district in Wisconsin, United States

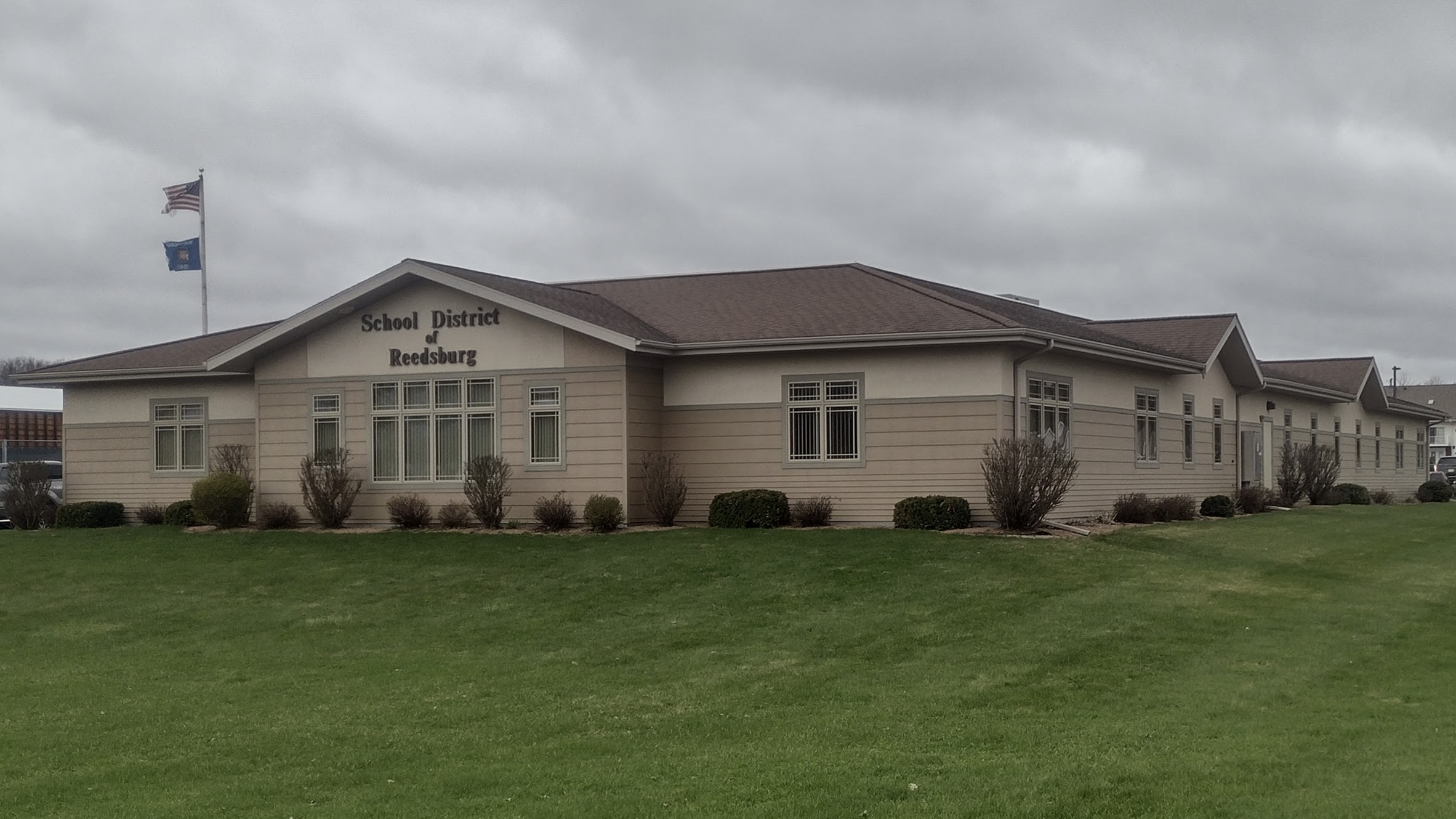
- District offices

Address
- 501 K Street Reedsburg, Sauk County, Wisconsin, 53959; United States
- Coordinates: 43.5249°N 90.0196°W

District information
- Type: Public
- Grades: Pre-K–12
- Superintendent: Tom Burkalter
- School board: seven members
- Chair of the board: Gary Woolever
- Schools: 6
- Budget: $32 million
- NCES District ID: 5512660

Students and staff
- Students: 2,591 (2024–25)
- Teachers: 193.59 (on an FTE basis)
- Student–teacher ratio: 13.38
- District mascot: Beaver

Other information
- Website: www.rsd.k12.wi.us

The School District of Reedsburg is a school district based in the city of Reedsburg, Wisconsin. It serves the city of Reedsburg, the villages of Ironton, La Valle, Loganville, and Rock Springs, and the surrounding rural area. Reedsburg has a seven-member Board of Education that governs the district and selects the superintendent.

The district administers three elementary schools, one middle school, and one high school, for a total of five schools.

The district is a member of Cooperative Educational Service Agency (CESA) #5.

== History ==
The first school in Reedsburg was organized in 1849 and served 7 students at first. The next year, a school district was formed and a house on Walnut Street was remodeled into a school house.

In 2010 the school district started a 4 year old kindergarten program in 2 schools, Pineview and Westside Elementary.

=== 2017 referendum ===
In 2017 a referendum was held to consider the closing of South School and opening a new elementary school. The referendum passed and a $32,000,000 million school was built on the edge of the city. The new school, named Prairie Ridge Intermediate School, was opened in 2019. Subsequently, South School was closed and later redeveloped into apartments.

=== COVID-19 pandemic ===
On 13 March 2020, Governor Tony Evers mandated the closure of all Wisconsin schools until 6 April. The school district followed the governor's order, and all schools were close immediately. Distance education was used for the remainder of the 2019–2020 school year, ending on 22 May, earlier than originally scheduled.

== General information ==
The district serves approx. 2,800 students. Its graduation rate is 94.3%. The district operates with a $32 million budget.

Two forests in Sauk County are owned by the district: the Hartje Outdoor Learning Center (near La Valle) and the Romoren School Forest (near Rock Springs).

The School District of Reedsburg covers approx. 264 square miles (680 km^{2}) in northern Sauk County and a small portion of Juneau County.

== Schools ==
School	Year built	Enrollment 2024-2025	Description	Picture
Reedsburg Area High School	1998	889	Reedsburg Area High School (RAHS) is on South Albert Avenue and serves as the only high school in the district. It contains an auditorium and an athletic complex.	
Webb Middle School	1957	563	Webb Middle School is on North Webb Avenue and serves as the only middle school in the district. It was named after Herbert H. Webb and served as the high school until RAHS was built.	
Prairie Ridge Intermediate School	2019	512	Prairie Ridge Intermediate School is on Eighth Street and serves as an elementary school. It was named after the surrounding geography. It was built as a replacement to South School.	
Pineview Elementary School	1968	385	Pineview Elementary School is on Eighth Street and serves as an elementary school. It was built in 1968 as a middle school until RAHS was built in 1998.	
Westside Elementary School		207	Westside Elementary School is on Alexander Avenue and serves as an elementary school.	

== Former schools ==
School	Year built	Year closed	Description	Picture
South School	1937	2019	South School was originally built in 1937, serving grades kindergarten to 12. It served students from the east side of the Baraboo River in Reedsburg. The school officially closed on June 11, 2019.	
Rock Springs Elementary School		2009	Rock Springs Elementary School was closed in 2010, as a result of a failed referendum to provide more funding for the school. The school was damaged in the 2008 flooding of the Baraboo River. The school served grades K-6.	
Ironton-La Valle Elementary School		2022	The school in La Valle was closed in 2022. The next year, it was purchased and converted into a community center.	
Loganville Elementary School		2022	The school closed alongside La Valle in 2022.	

== Leadership ==
The current superintendent is Tom Burkalter, who accepted the position on July 1, 2025. Roger Rindo was the previous superintendent from July 1, 2021 until 2025.

=== Board of education ===
The district is run by a seven-member school board. Members are elected in April for staggered three-year terms. Board seats are divided geographically to represent both the rural area of the district and the part inside the City of Reedsburg.

Position	Name	Area Represents	Assumed office	Term ends	Electoral history	Refs
President	Gary Woolever	Reedsburg	2005	2026	Appointed President in 2013.	
Vice President	Ross Retzlaff	Area II		2027		
Board Clerk	LuAnn Brey	Rural At-Large		2028		
Board Member	Leo Almeida	Reedsburg		2028		
Board Member	Gabe Bauer	Area I	2019	2028		
Board Member	Nikki Foesch	Reedsburg		2027		
Board Member	Heather Westphal	Area III		2026		
