= Albert O. Sorge =

American businessman and politician

Albert Owen Sorge (February 9, 1881 – August 30, 1967) was an American businessman and politician.

Born in the town of Reedsburg, Sauk County, Wisconsin, Sorge served in the Wisconsin National Guard for two years. He went to dairy school at University of Wisconsin, worked with creameries in Elroy, Wisconsin and then worked for his father Henry W. Sorge in the creamery business in Reedsburg, Wisconsin. Sorge was involved with the Baraboo Valley Agricultural Association. In 1911, Sorge served in the Wisconsin State Assembly and was a Democrat. In 1911, Sorge bought an interest in Tri-State Ice Cream Company (later Dolly Madison Dairy) in La Crosse, Wisconsin. He moved to La Crosse and was involved with Sorge Dairy Supply Company, in La Crosse, and Sorge Ice Cream and Dairy Company in Manitowoc, Wisconsin. Sorge died in a hospital in La Crosse, Wisconsin and was buried in Reedsburg, Wisconsin.
