= 125 East Main (Reedsburg, Wisconsin) =

- City Hotel
- U.S. National Register of Historic Places
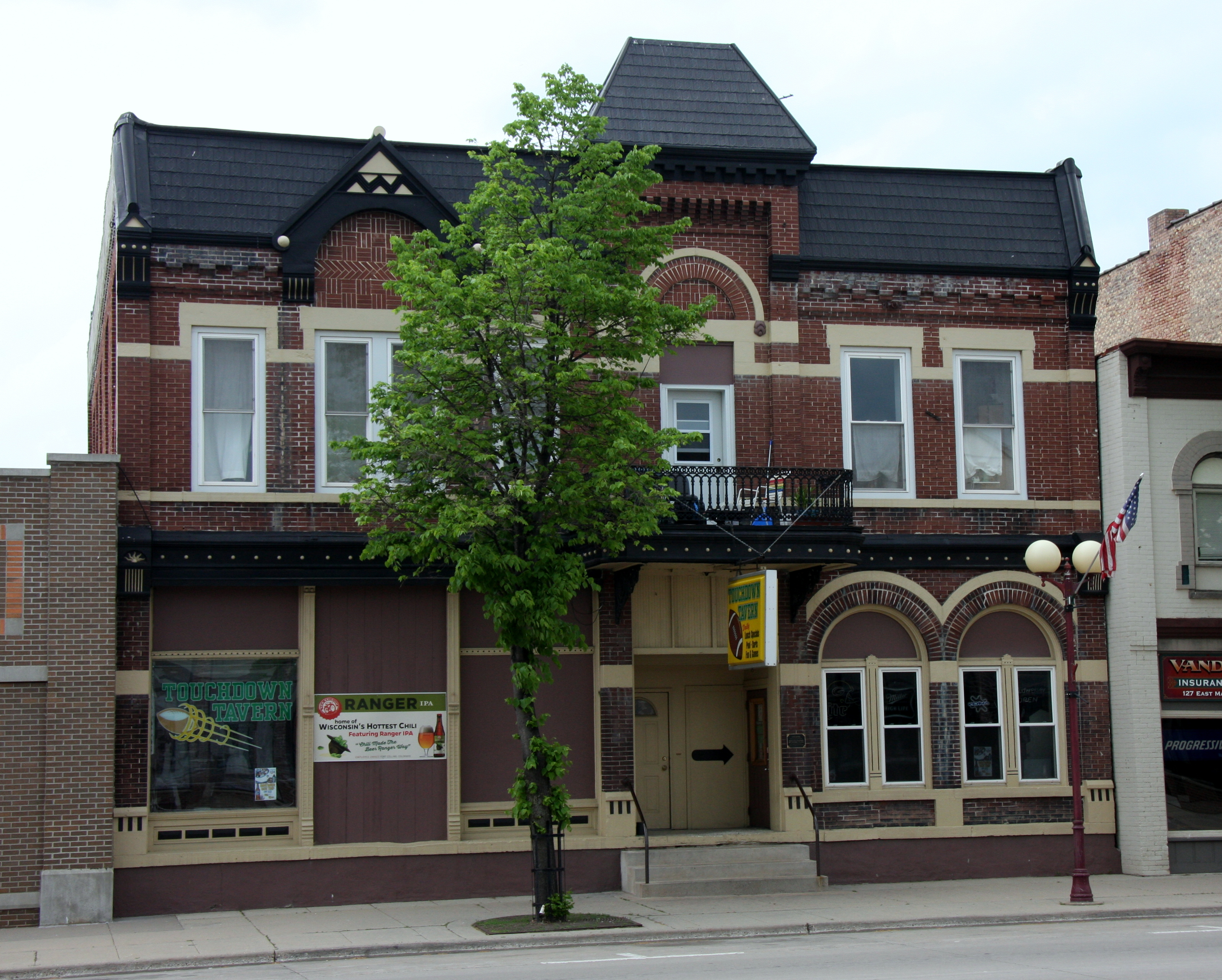

- Location within Wisconsin Location within the United States
- Location: 125 Main St., Reedsburg, Wisconsin
- Coordinates: 43°31′57″N 90°0′33″W
- Area: less than one acre
- Built: 1886
- Built by: Reedsburg Building & Lumber Co.
- Architect: Edward M. Hackett
- Architectural style: Second Empire
- MPS: Reedsburg MRA
- NRHP reference No.: 84000642
- Added to NRHP: December 26, 1984

A historic hotel building in the Second Empire style is at 125 East Main Street in Reedsburg, Wisconsin, United States. The building was originally built as "Roper's City Hotel". The two-story red brick structure with stone trim and a mansard roof was designed by Edward M. Hackett and constructed in 1886 for $10,000. It includes arched window frames, brick detailing on the facade and a small porch with ornamental metal balustrade on the second floor. It was listed on the National Register of Historic Places for Wisconsin in 1984. It was built by the Reedsburg Building & Lumber Co.

The building most recently housed the Beastro & Barley restaurant and bar downstairs and a single large apartment upstairs. The prior occupants include: Touchdown Tavern, Reedsburg Hotel, and Roper's City Hotel. Beastro & Barley is known for its trademarked "Reedsburger", a hamburger prepared with locally sourced Bison. The restaurant also houses the "Agnes Moorehead Lounge", an exhibit of memorabilia from Agnes Moorehead's career in radio, stage, television and movies, including as the witch mother-in-law on the television sitcom Bewitched. Beastro & Barley is one of the venues for Reedsburg's Fermentation Fest. Beastro & Barley has since closed permanently as of Mike and Kari retiring, and deleting the Facebook page.

== History ==
Roper's City Hotel was built in 1886 on Main Street. The hotel had 17 guest rooms, and a main dining room. William Roper retired in 1909, and he sold the building to another family. The new owners remodeled the interior. For the next 40 years, the building would be sold from owner to owner, but they all kept using it as a hotel. In 1945, the building was again remodeled, and renamed to the Reedsburg Hotel. The Reedsburg Hotel kept the same exterior, but only had 13 guest rooms, and a spot for Zobel's Tavern. The Reedsburg Hotel would continue until the 1960s. In the 1960s, the name was changed to Town Club & Bar, and was primarily a bar, and no longer had hotel accommodations. The Town Club & Bar would continue until the 1970s, in which the name was changed to the Town Club Bar. In 1984, it was listed on the National Register of Historic Places for Wisconsin.

In the early 2000s, the building was purchased and became the home for the Touchdown Tavern. The restaurant would continue for 15 years, and in 2020 the name was changed to Beastro & Barley. The new restaurant is a continuation of the old Touchdown Tavern, with a focus on a more high quality experience.

== See also ==
- National Register of Historic Places listings in Sauk County, Wisconsin
