= Fermentation Fest =

Coordinates: 43°31′56″N 90°00′38″W

- Venue: Farms along county roads
- Location(s): Sauk County, Wisconsin
- Established: 2010

Fermentation Fest is a 10-day celebration of farming, food, and art in Reedsburg, and Sauk County, Wisconsin. It was established in 2010 based on a Smithsonian Institution travelling exhibit titled "Key Ingredients: America by Food" and includes classes, the Farm/Art DTour, which is a self-guided driving tour on 50 miles of Wisconsin backroads including signposts, art installations, market stands and live performances. Cheesemakers, beekeepers, composters, picklers, organic farmers, writers, and sculptors take part. There are hay bale sculptures. Venues involved include the historic Beastro & Barley, Wormfarm Institute, and Harvest Park in Reedsburg, which features Ruminant, the Grand Masticator.

It is funded with National Endowment for the Arts and ArtPlace grant money, as well as funding from Sauk County's tourism department, and the State of Wisconsin's tourism department. which is touting the event throughout the Midwest. The event is run in conjunction with Sauk County's long-standing Fall Art Tour of art gallery exhibitions and the Mid-Continent Railway Museum's seven-mile Autumn Color Railroad Tour in the Baraboo Hills.
