= Reedsburg Brewery =

- U.S. National Register of Historic Places
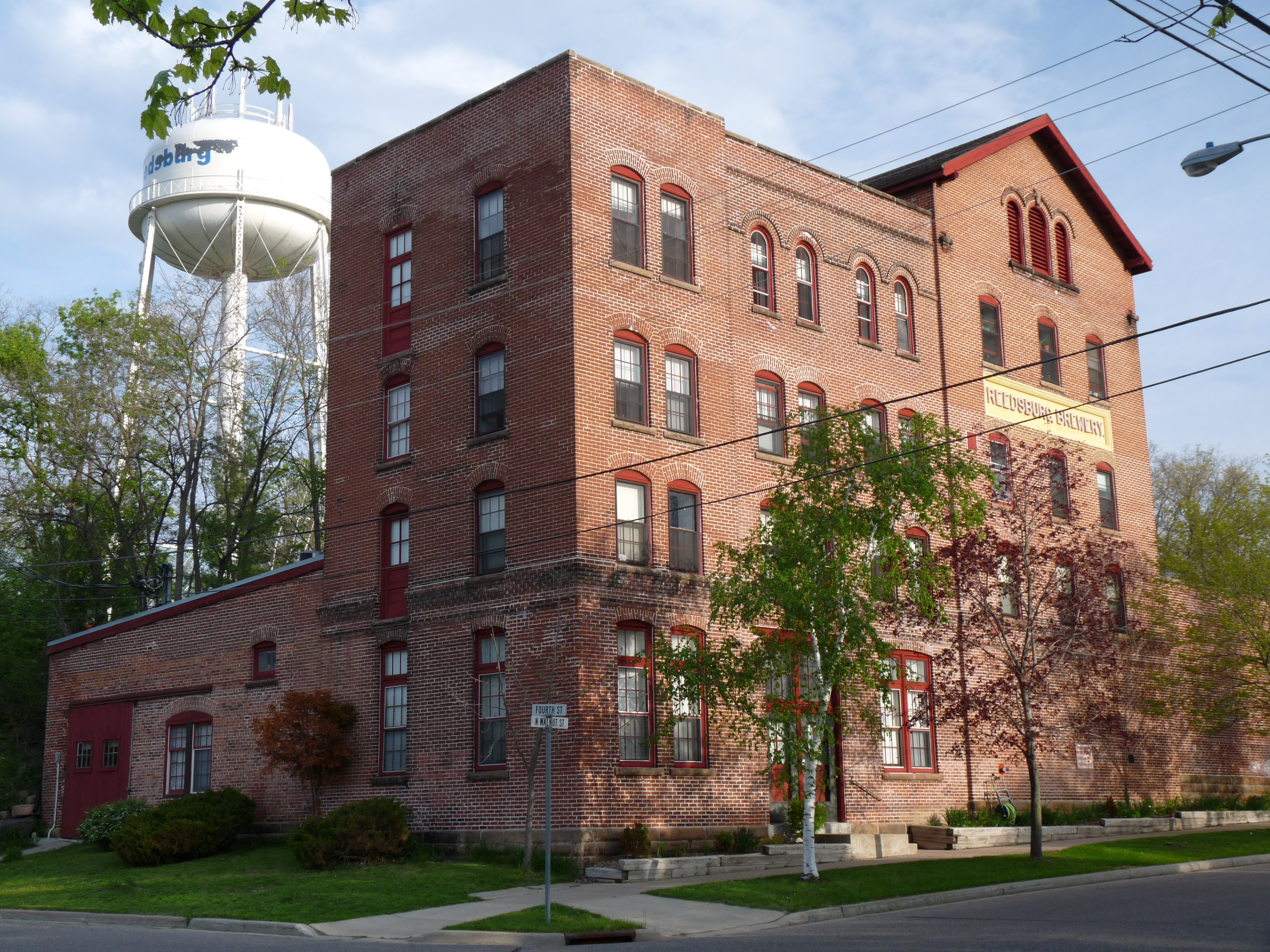
- Location: 401 N. Walnut St., Reedsburg, Wisconsin
- Coordinates: 43°32′09″N 90°00′30″W
- Area: less than one acre
- Built: 1904
- Architectural style: Romanesque
- MPS: Reedsburg MRA
- NRHP reference No.: 84000661
- Added to NRHP: December 26, 1984

The Reedsburg Brewery is a historic brewery located in Reedsburg, Wisconsin. The company was founded in the 1860s, during the hops boom. The building was rebuilt in 1904, after a large fire destroyed the original structure. The Reedsburg Brewery served as the primary manufacturer of beer for the city, up until Prohibition, in the 1920s. It reopened again in 1933, but eventually had to close in 1950 due to decreasing sales. In 1984, it was added to the National Register of Historic Places.

The building sat unused for over 30 years, occasionally being used as a warehouse. In 1987, after pressure from the city, a developer remodeled the interior of the structure into apartments. The building still serves as apartments, with most of the exterior kept intact.

== Description ==
Reedsburg Brewery is located at 401 North Walnut Street in Reedsburg, Wisconsin. The property is 300 by 60 feet (91 by 18 m) and originally contained four buildings–a brewery, office, bottling works, and a house. The house no longer exists and the office and bottling works have been connected. The complex is built out of brick in a "simplified" Romanesque style according to the National Register of Historic Places. The Wisconsin State Register calls it an astylistic utilitarian building.

== History ==
=== Old building ===
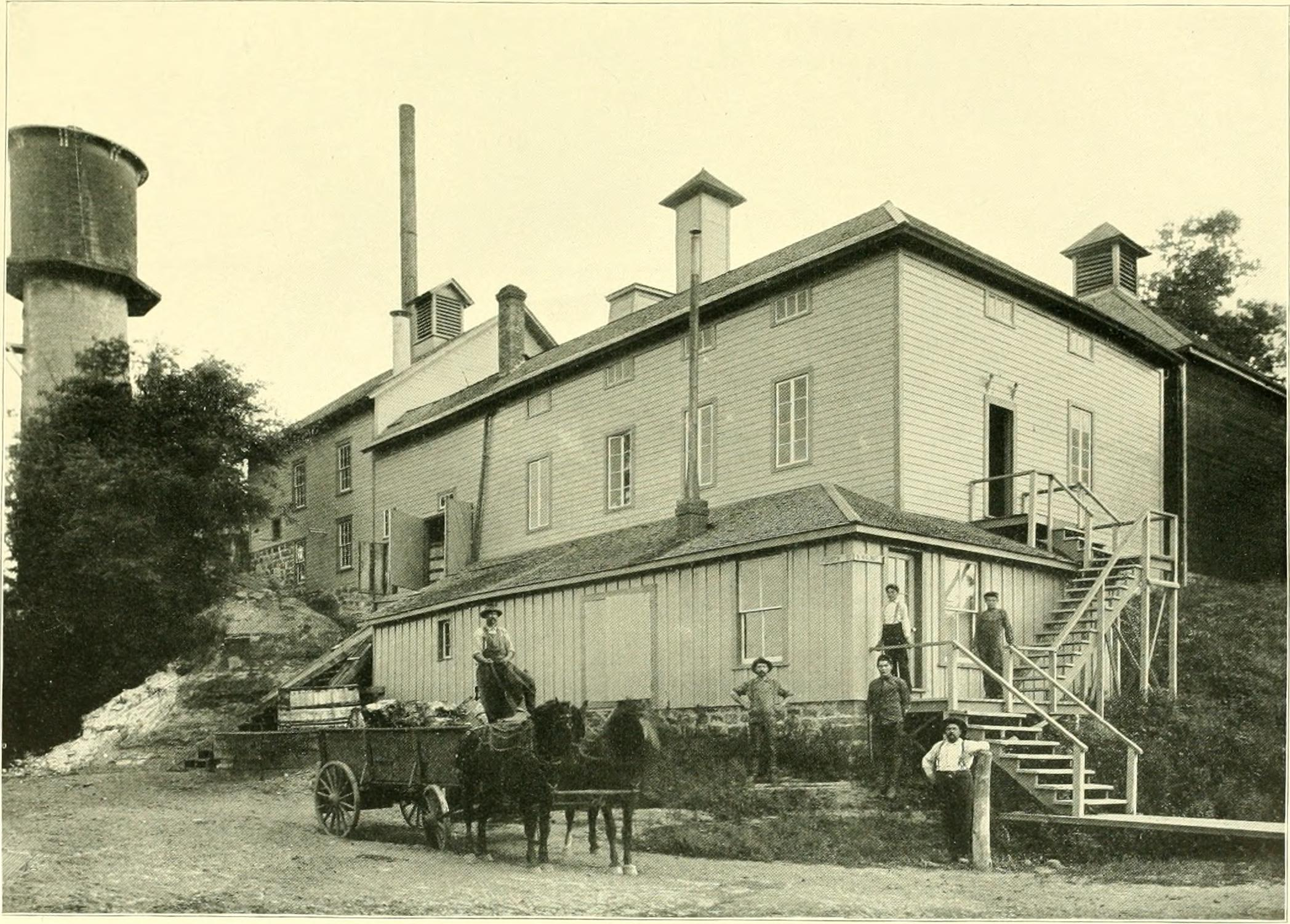
Old Reedsburg Brewery building, pictured 1901

The hop boom of the 1860s brought the first Reedsburg Brewery to town. Frank and Florin Meckler built a brewery on North Walnut Street. The business would burn down several times and be sold to several owners. In 1880 the business was sold yet again and become the Reedsburg Brewing Company. The brewery was only producing 350 barrels of beer per year as compared to the 1,000 barrels in previous years. A large fire burned down this building in 1904.

=== New building to present ===
On the same site in 1904, the new Reedsburg Brewery building was built, out of brick. This new building was able to produce 5,000 barrels of beer every year. The business closed in 1950, after sales declined heavily. For the next 30 years, the building was left unused. In 1984, it was listed on the National Register of Historic Places, and was remodeled into apartments in 1987.
