= Edward M. Hackett House =

Historic house in Wisconsin, United States

- U.S. National Register of Historic Places
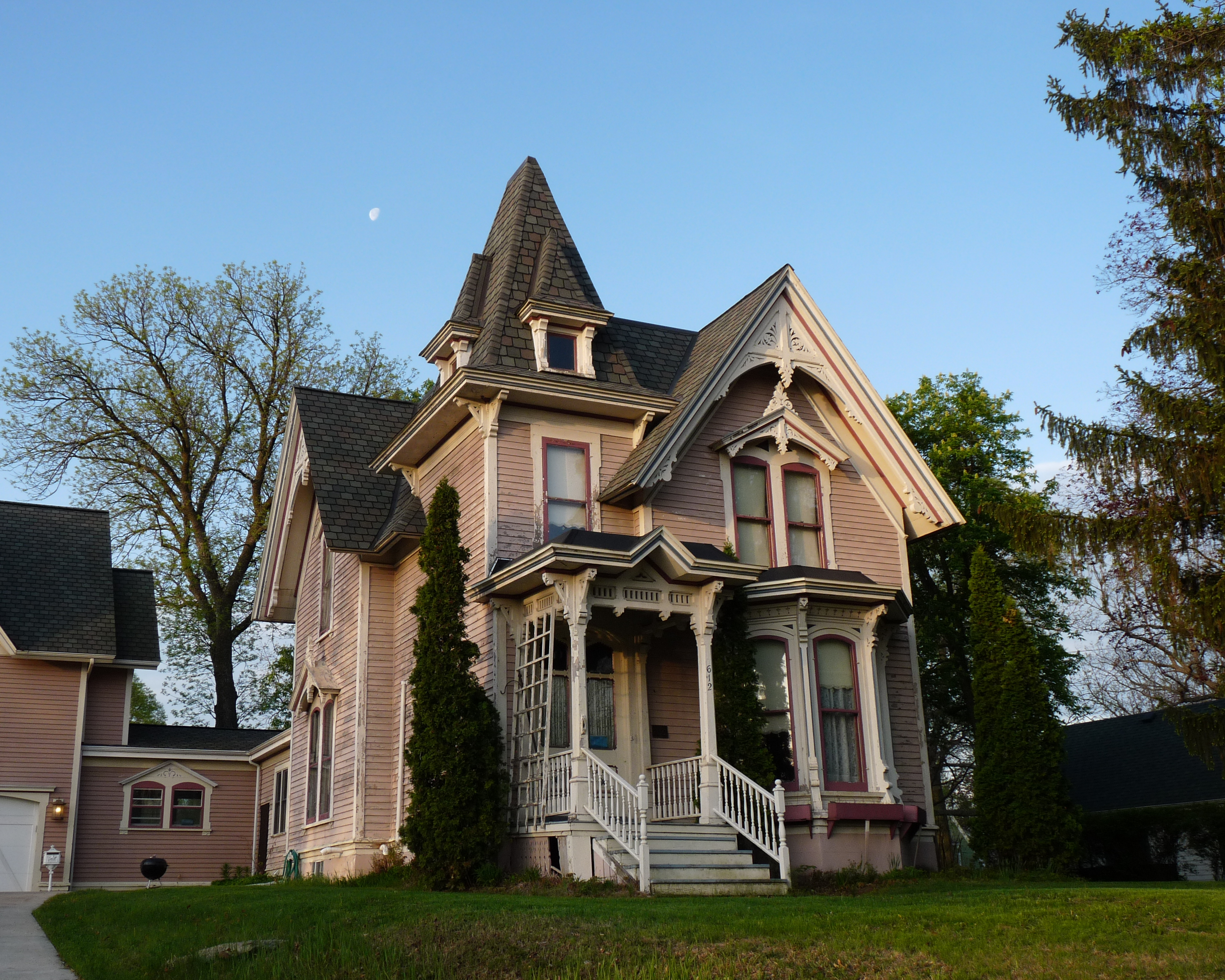

- Location within Wisconsin Location within the United States
- Location: 612 E. Main St. Reedsburg, Wisconsin
- Coordinates: 43°31′55″N 90°0′7″W
- Built: 1878
- Architect: Edward M. Hackett
- Architectural style: High Victorian Gothic
- NRHP reference No.: 84000644
- Added to NRHP: December 26, 1984

The Edward M. Hackett House is a historic house located at 612 East Main Street in Reedsburg, Wisconsin. It is designed in High Victorian Gothic style, with intricate bargeboards and bay windows. The house was built and originally owned by Edward M. Hackett, a lumberman, builder, and architect who also designed the Second Empire style City Hotel, now known as Touchdown Tavern. The Hackett House was added to the National Register of Historic Places on December 26, 1984.
