= Reedsburg Municipal Airport =

Airport serving Reedsburg, Wisconsin, US

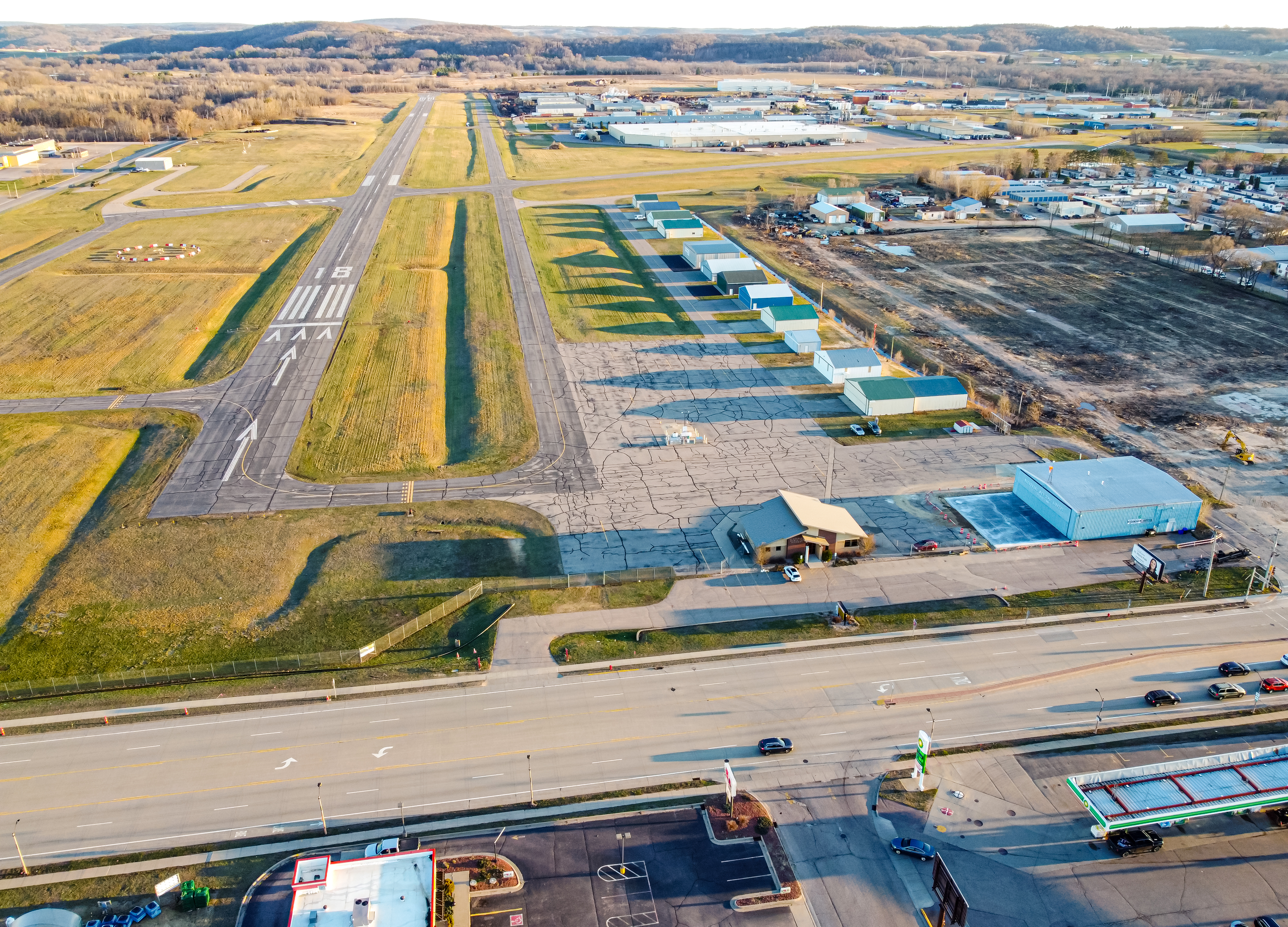
- Aerial view in 2024.
- IATA: none; ICAO: none; FAA LID: C35

Summary
- Airport type: Public
- Owner: City of Reedsburg
- Serves: Reedsburg, Wisconsin, US
- Opened: March 1928
- Time zone: CST (UTC−06:00)
  - Summer (DST): CDT (UTC−05:00)
- Elevation AMSL: 906 ft / 276 m
- Coordinates: 43°31′33″N 089°59′00″W

Map
- Location of airport in Wisconsin C35 (the United States)

Runways
Direction	Length		Surface
Direction	ft	m	Surface
18/36	4,840	1,475	Asphalt
7/25	2,510	765	Asphalt

Statistics
- Aircraft operations (2022): approx. 15,000
- Based aircraft (2022): 20
- Source: Federal Aviation Administration

Reedsburg Municipal Airport, (FAA LID: C35) is a city-owned, public use airport located one mile (two km) east of the central business district of Reedsburg, Wisconsin, a city in Sauk County, Wisconsin, United States. The airport opened in March 1928 and has continues to serve as a general aviation airport operated by the city of Reedsburg. The airport is located 906 feet (276 m) above sea level and has two runways: one 4,840 feet (1,480 m) long, and a second 2,510 feet (770 m) long. It also has a terminal building and several hangars.

== History ==
The Reedsburg Chamber of Commerce rented an 80-acre (32 ha) farm east of Reedsburg for use as an airport in March 1928. Local business leaders had discussed organizing an airport in Reedsburg in the fall of 1927. Cecil Hess, a local aviator, purchased a plane in 1928, which prompted the Chamber of Commerce to develop an airport. The chamber developed two runways perpendicular to each other, with one of them being 1,000 feet (300 m) long and with a grass surface. The next year, it was purchased by the city itself. The airport hosted Orland Corbin in his new Ace Baby Ace plane as part of an air show in 1930. As part of a Civil Works Administration project in 1934, the airport received funding to be rebuilt, since by then it was considered to be unusable for any purpose. The new runways were constructed out of gravel.

In 1952, the first "fly-in, drive-in" breakfast was hosted by the Civil Air Patrol at the airport. The event invited local pilots to fly in, and the rest of the public to drive in and enjoy a breakfast. This first event had about 20 pilots and 200 attendees. It has been held annually since. Four years later, in 1956, a 1,600 by 50 feet (488 by 15 m) runway was built with a gravel surface. To allow for easier night time use, the city installed automatic lights on its runway. N.E. Isaacson, the constructor of Lake Redstone among other lakes, had a water runway built at the airport during the 1960s for his floatplane. It was later abandoned and filled in. In 1969, he contributed $100,000 (equivalent to $877,949 in 2025) to expansion of the east/west runway to 4,500 feet (1,400 m).

The city finished the north/south runway with asphalt in 1973. 24 hour fuel service was offered five years later. The airport underwent another major renovation in 1997, including resurfacing both of its runways. In celebration of the 50th annual fly-in, drive-in breakfast in 2002, several WWII era planes were present, including a P-51 Mustang fighter plane. In the early 2000s a number of state funded projects improved the airport: a fence in 2003, a ground communication outlet in 2004, and sealcoating the two runways in 2005.

In 2014, a new terminal was proposed; the city wanted to use the location of the original terminal to build a street. That new terminal was built the next year using $754,483 (equivalent to $1,024,796 in 2025) in FAA funding. The previous terminal was located in a building adjacent to a hangar, and was built by N.E. Isaacson. To avoid a new road, this hangar would have to be moved or demolished. A local business owner offered to take the expense of moving it 50 feet (15 m) and purchased it that year in 2024. On this hangar, a tribute was built honoring N.E. Isaacson.

== Facilities and statistics ==
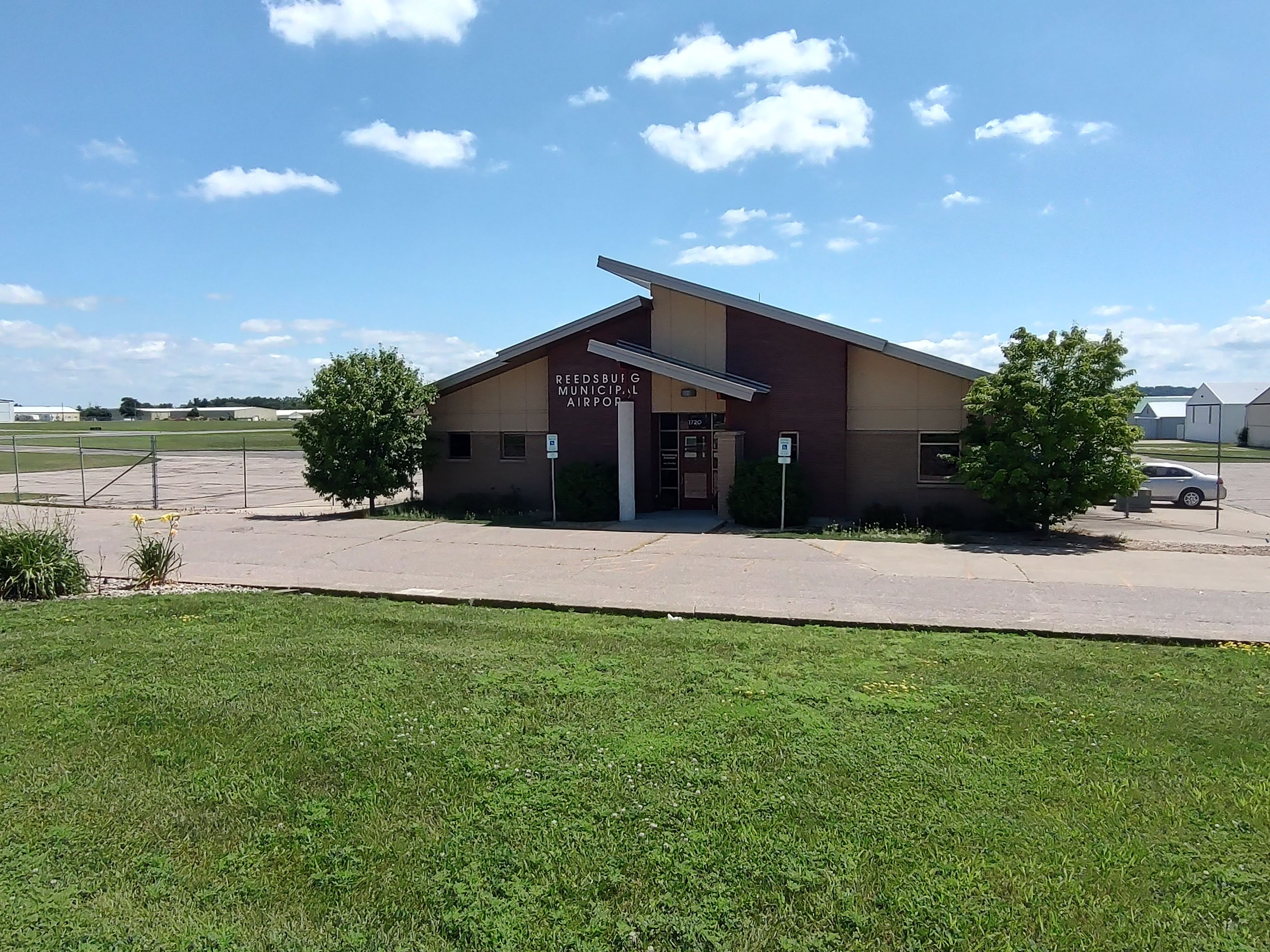
Airport terminal building in 2025

Reedsburg Municipal Airport covers an area of 153 acres (62 ha) at an elevation of 906 feet (276 m) above mean sea level. The airport is located on State Highway 33 and is surrounded by industrial and commercial uses and an undeveloped forest to the southeast. There is a terminal building that includes 24/7 pilot access. The airport has two runways, both with asphalt surfaces. The longer runway 18/36 is 4,840 by 75 feet (1,475 by 23 m) with approved GPS approaches. The shorter runway 7/25 is 2,510 by 50 feet (765 by 15 m).

It is included in the Federal Aviation Administration (FAA) National Plan of Integrated Airport Systems for 2025–2029, in which it is categorized as a local general aviation facility. Although most airports in the United States use the same three-letter location identifier for the FAA and International Air Transport Association (IATA), this airport is assigned C35 by the FAA but has no designation from the IATA.

The airport hosted Skydive Wisconsin Dells from 2020 to 2022. The airport hosts its annual "fly-in, drive in" breakfast fundraiser in early June.

The airport receives roughly 15,000 aircraft operations each year since around 2002. It averages 39 per day: 50% transit, 47% local general aviation, 2% air taxi and 1% military. In 2022 there were 20 aircraft based at this airport. During the 2024 EAA AirVenture Oshkosh convention, the airport handled over 600 aircraft, a record, as pilots were stopping for fuel, food, or rest on their way to Oshkosh.

== Accidents and incidents ==
- On August 4, 2011, a Challenger II crashed shortly after taking off, killing both the pilot and passenger.
- On April 20, 2019, a Cessna 180 crashed on the runway. The pilot survived with minor injuries.

== See also ==
- List of airports in Wisconsin
