= Sorger =

Sorger is a surname of German origin. Notable people with the surname include:

- Bob Sorger, Canadian television director
- Craig Sorger (1990–2003), American murder victim
- Peter Karl Sorger (born 1961), Canadian systems and cancer biologist

== See also ==
- Sorge (disambiguation)
