= Henry W. Sorge =

American politician

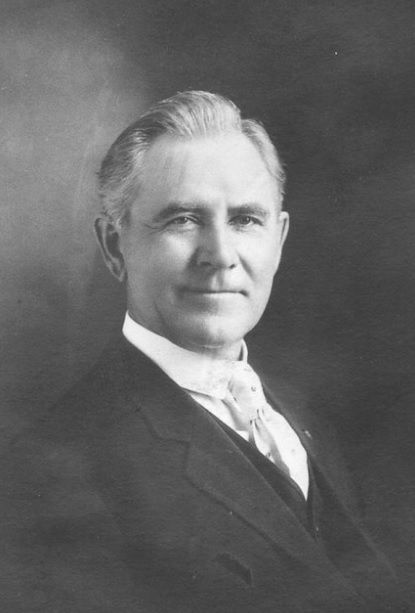
Henry W. Sorge (1852-1921)

Henry W. Sorge (March 18, 1852 – March 20, 1921) was an American farmer and politician.

Born in the Kingdom of Hanover, Sorge emigrated to the United States, in 1868, with an older brother. He settled in the town of Reedsburg, Sauk County, Wisconsin. Sorge was a farmer. He served on the Reedsburg Town Board and on the Sauk County Board of Supervisors. Sorge also served on the school board and was the board treasurer. In 1891, Sorge served in the Wisconsin State Assembly and was a Democrat. His son Albert O. Sorge also served in the Wisconsin State Assembly. Sorge died in Reedsburg, Wisconsin.
