= Reedsburg, Wisconsin =

City in Sauk County, Wisconsin, United States

- City
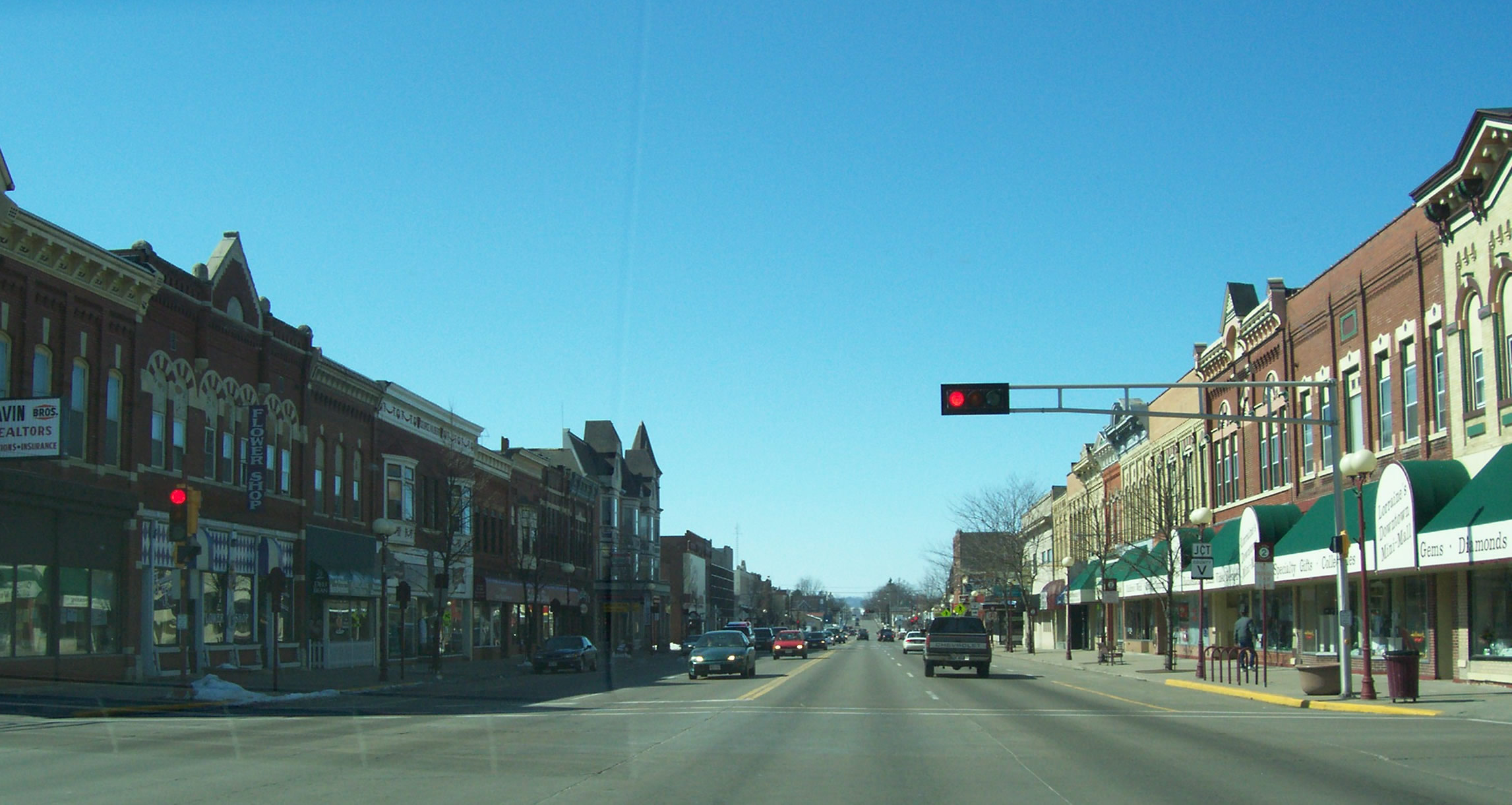
- Downtown Reedsburg

- Location of Reedsburg in Sauk County, Wisconsin.

- Location within Wisconsin Location within the United States
- Coordinates: 43°32′2″N 90°0′10″W
- Country: United States
- State: Wisconsin
- County: Sauk
- Named for: David C. Reed

Government
  - Type: Mayor-council
  - Mayor: David G. Estes
  - City Administrator: Maximilian Buckner

Area
  - Total: 6.04 sq mi (15.65 km^{2})
  - Land: 5.93 sq mi (15.36 km^{2})
  - Water: 0.11 sq mi (0.29 km^{2})

Population (2020)
  - Total: 9,984
  - Density: 1,683/sq mi (650.0/km^{2})
- Time zone: UTC-6 (Central (CST))
  - Summer (DST): UTC-5 (CDT)
- Zip Codes: 53958, 53959
- Area code: 608
- FIPS code: 55-66800
- Website: www.reedsburgwi.gov

Reedsburg is a city in Sauk County, Wisconsin, United States. Its population in 2020 was 9,984. The city is located 55 miles (89 km) northwest of Madison within the Baraboo micropolitan area. The city is surrounded by the Town of Reedsburg and is situated along the Baraboo River. It is the second-largest city in Sauk County after Baraboo, with a population of 9,984 at the time of the 2020 United States census.

Prior to the arrival of non-indigenous people in the 19th century, the region was home to the Ho-Chunk people. Reedsburg was first settled by James W. Babb in 1845. David C. Reed arrived in 1847, building a dam and being the namesake of the town. After the town was platted in 1852, growth would continue through its incorporation as a city in 1887. Historically, the area has relied on agriculture and manufacturing industries.

Reedsburg would grow significantly following World War II and again from 1990–2010.

== History ==
=== Early settlement ===
Early settlers came to this area due to the abundance of natural resources, especially lumber. In 1844, the first copper mine was established in this area, but it was soon abandoned. James W. Babb and his wife Rebecca Scarff Babb are the earliest recorded settlers, having brought their family to Wisconsin from Ohio in 1845. At a place 55 miles northeast of Mineral Point (the capital of Wisconsin Territory), long identified by the Winnebago who inhabited these lands as a convenient place to cross the Baraboo River, Babb left a flat-bottomed boat to help move supplies.

At "Babb's Ford," in 1847 David C. Reed built a dam and a shanty to house the workers who constructed it. In June 1848 a sawmill followed. By 1850, "Shanty Row" comprised five tamarack shanties. These initial buildings were of poor construction, and did not have a strong foundation, due to the black-alder swamp by the Baraboo River. Main Street would later be built where "Shanty Row" stood.

Reedsburg was platted in 1852, and four years later the community had grown to 50 buildings housing 27 families and 122 people. The first bridge across the Baraboo River was built in 1853, located where the Main Street bridge would later be built. In 1854 the Mackey brothers purchased Reed's saw mill, and brought economic security to the area. As the town was growing, more farms continued to be developed around the area, cultivating a variety of crops.

=== Late 1800s ===
The community continued under town government until 1868, when Reedsburg was incorporated as a village; it became a city in May 1887. In the 1860s, a hop boom temporarily brought wealth into the area. After the crash of the hops market, more farms started to diversify, and Reedsburg would become known for its grain and dairy products. The Chicago & North Western Railway (C&NW) arrived in 1872.

In the 1870s, Main Street started to develop, with grocery stores, banks, and other businesses establishing in Reedsburg. In 1880, the Reedsburg Brewing Company was formed. As the city continued to grow, more industries came to Reedsburg. On December 1, 1883, the Webb and Schweke department store opened, known as the "Big Store". The store would go on to be the largest department store in Sauk County. The City Hotel opened in 1886, owned by William Roper. Among the most important was the Reedsburg Woolen Mill. Construction was completed in 1882, and by 1899, 32 broad looms produced mainly "fancy cassimeres" for Chicago markets.

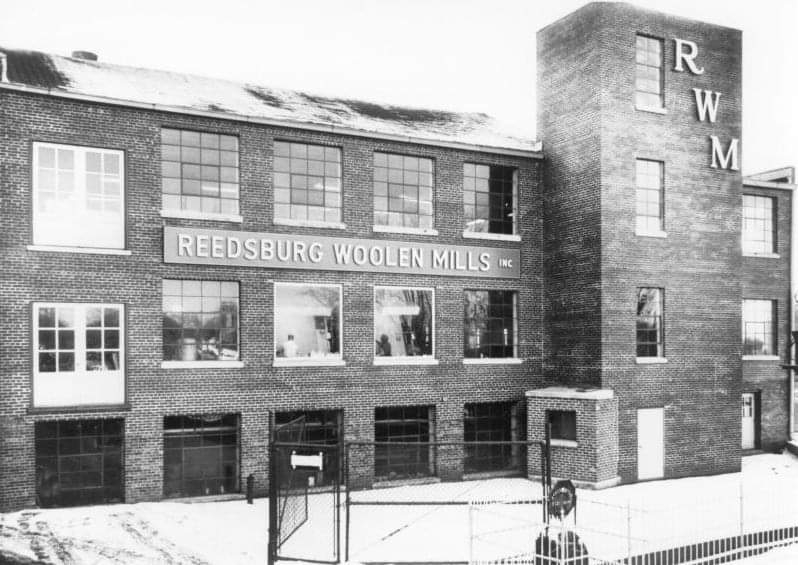
Reedsburg Woolen Mill in 1921.

=== 1900s ===
In 1902 the facility was purchased by Appleton Woolen Mills, and began producing clothing for east coast outlets. Sears and Montgomery Wards became two major clients. In 1910, the Central Wisconsin Creamery opened, making Reedsburg famous for its butter production. In 1954, when Appleton Woolen Mills shifted focus to felts, the business in Reedsburg reorganized to emphasize novelty fabrics. The Big Store burned down in 1957, after 78 years of service. The Reedsburg Woolen Mill, long one of the area's largest employers, endured until 1967; most of the mill complex burned in April 1968, leaving only the mill office.

In 1928, the Reedsburg Municipal Airport was first established on an 80 acres (32 ha) farm east of the city. It would be later purchased by the city and continues to be used today as a general aviation airport.

In 1951, Herbert Webb left Reedsburg a $300,000 trust fund, which is equivalent to over 4 million dollars, adjusted for inflation. He also set aside funding for Webb Park and Webb High School on the northeast side of Reedsburg, before his death in 1954.

Another important business has been the Hankscraft Company. Incorporated in Madison in 1920, Hankscraft—makers of baby bottle warmers, sterilizers and other products—thrived during the post-war baby boom, and in 1949 opened a plant in Reedsburg. In 1961, Hankscraft purchased Nursmatic Corporation, expanding their line to include bassinets, safety harnesses, baby toiletries and other products; a year later, the acquisition of Ruzicka Laboratories allowed the firm to expand once more, adding vaporizer fluids, baby oil, shampoo and lotions. In 1970, Hankscraft was purchased by Gerber Products Company, and began producing baby food. It was the town's second largest employer, exceeded only by the Reedsburg Woolen Mill.

In the 1980s, the Wisconsin and Southern Railroad came to Reedsburg, having purchased the old C&NW railroad track. In 1996, Gerber Products Company sold Hankscraft Motors, which continues to operate in Reedsburg. Other important industries have included Grede Foundry, Seats, Inc., and the Columbia Par Car Corporation.

In 1971, the first Butter Festival, now known as Butterfest, was held in Webb Park. It was a celebration of the farming and dairy industry. In 1984, together the Main Street Commercial Historic District and the Park Street Historic District were added to the National Register of Historic Places. In 1993, 22 miles of the C&NW rail line between Reedsburg and Elroy became the Wisconsin 400 State Trail, a hiking/biking trail named for the passenger rail line that was said to travel the 400 miles between Chicago and Minneapolis/St. Paul in 400 minutes.

=== 2000s ===
Fermentation Fest, an annual celebration of Reedsburg's agricultural heritage, was established in 2010. As part of the movement in 2014, Harvest Park was created as a downtown park featuring "Ruminant", a decorated piece of farm equipment, as a permanent installation.

The Baraboo River flooded in both 2008 and 2018, destroying several homes and businesses. As a result of the flooding, two new parks were created – Mackey Park and the Community Market.

== Geography ==
Reedsburg is located in northern Sauk County, approximately 55 miles (89 km) northwest of Madison. The city sits on the 90th meridian west at 43°32′1″N 90°0′10″W (43.533854, -90.002902). A pink quartzite marker on Main Street reads 325 feet east of this point lies the 90th meridian. The marker was dedicated on October 14, 1963, to designate Reedsburg's unique location. It was donated by Whitney Memorials and erected by the Kiwanis Club.

According to the United States Census Bureau, the city has a total area of 5.93 square miles (15.36 km^{2}), of which 5.83 square miles (15.10 km^{2}) is land and 0.10 square miles (0.26 km^{2}) is water. The Baraboo River flows through the city.

Lake Virginia is a small lake on the east side of Reedsburg. Lake Redstone and Dutch Hollow Lake are 2 reservoirs located in the nearby town of La Valle. Babb Creek, Hay Creek, and Copper Creek, tributaries of the Baraboo River, all flow through Reedsburg. Babb Creek was named for early settler James W. Babb. Hay and Copper Creek were named for the farming and short lived mining industry in Reedsburg.

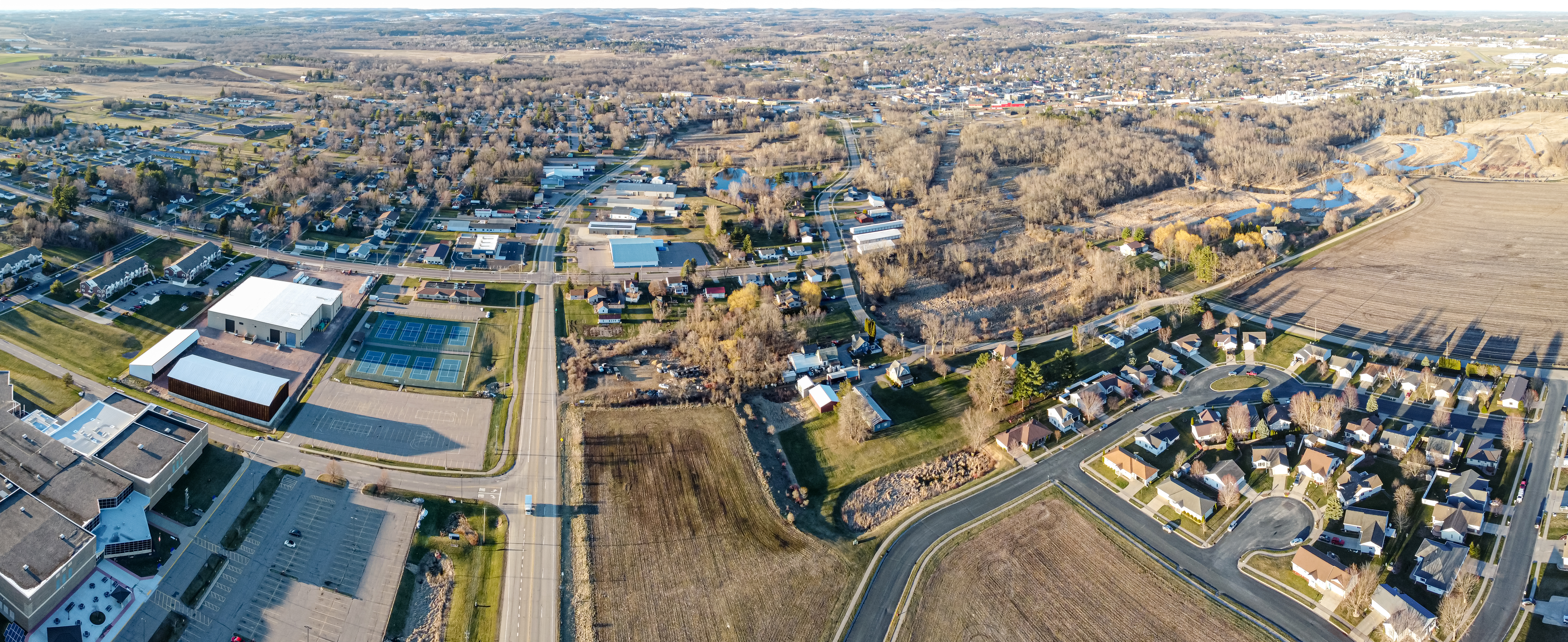

== Climate ==
According to the Köppen Climate Classification system, Reedsburg has a warm-summer humid continental climate, abbreviated "Dfb" on climate maps. The hottest temperature recorded in Reedsburg was 104 °F (40.0 °C) on July 31, 1988, while the coldest temperature recorded was −42 °F (−41.1 °C) on January 30, 1951.

Climate data for Reedsburg, Wisconsin, 1991–2020 normals, extremes 1893–present
Month	Jan	Feb	Mar	Apr	May	Jun	Jul	Aug	Sep	Oct	Nov	Dec	Year
Record high °F (°C)	60 (16)	72 (22)	85 (29)	95 (35)	94 (34)	103 (39)	104 (40)	103 (39)	98 (37)	91 (33)	76 (24)	66 (19)	104 (40)
Mean maximum °F (°C)	46.1 (7.8)	50.6 (10.3)	65.0 (18.3)	79.5 (26.4)	85.4 (29.7)	89.7 (32.1)	91.3 (32.9)	90.6 (32.6)	86.5 (30.3)	79.2 (26.2)	65.0 (18.3)	51.4 (10.8)	93.5 (34.2)
Mean daily maximum °F (°C)	27.0 (−2.8)	31.9 (−0.1)	44.0 (6.7)	57.3 (14.1)	69.4 (20.8)	78.5 (25.8)	82.2 (27.9)	80.2 (26.8)	72.8 (22.7)	60.0 (15.6)	45.1 (7.3)	32.8 (0.4)	56.8 (13.8)
Daily mean °F (°C)	17.5 (−8.1)	21.7 (−5.7)	33.7 (0.9)	46.0 (7.8)	58.0 (14.4)	67.6 (19.8)	71.5 (21.9)	69.2 (20.7)	61.3 (16.3)	48.8 (9.3)	36.0 (2.2)	24.0 (−4.4)	46.3 (7.9)
Mean daily minimum °F (°C)	7.9 (−13.4)	11.5 (−11.4)	23.4 (−4.8)	34.7 (1.5)	46.5 (8.1)	56.7 (13.7)	60.9 (16.1)	58.2 (14.6)	49.8 (9.9)	37.6 (3.1)	26.9 (−2.8)	15.2 (−9.3)	35.8 (2.1)
Mean minimum °F (°C)	−11.5 (−24.2)	−11.9 (−24.4)	0.6 (−17.4)	21.9 (−5.6)	31.3 (−0.4)	43.5 (6.4)	50.3 (10.2)	46.8 (8.2)	34.4 (1.3)	24.4 (−4.2)	12.9 (−10.6)	−3.2 (−19.6)	−17.5 (−27.5)
Record low °F (°C)	−42 (−41)	−40 (−40)	−34 (−37)	2 (−17)	23 (−5)	34 (1)	41 (5)	34 (1)	12 (−11)	9 (−13)	−12 (−24)	−27 (−33)	−42 (−41)
Average precipitation inches (mm)	1.51 (38)	1.54 (39)	2.20 (56)	3.84 (98)	4.29 (109)	5.40 (137)	5.27 (134)	4.74 (120)	3.55 (90)	3.07 (78)	2.17 (55)	1.99 (51)	39.57 (1,005)
Average snowfall inches (cm)	9.9 (25)	14.8 (38)	5.1 (13)	2.7 (6.9)	0.0 (0.0)	0.0 (0.0)	0.0 (0.0)	0.0 (0.0)	0.0 (0.0)	0.4 (1.0)	1.7 (4.3)	9.3 (24)	43.9 (112.2)
Average precipitation days (≥ 0.01 in)	7.8	8.1	8.7	11.5	12.8	11.4	9.1	9.7	10.3	11.4	8.1	9.9	118.8
Average snowy days (≥ 0.1 in)	6.2	6.7	2.8	1.1	0.0	0.0	0.0	0.0	0.0	0.2	1.2	5.2	23.4
Source 1: NOAA
Source 2: National Weather Service

== Demographics ==
Historical population
Census	Pop.	Note	%±
1860	461		—
1870	547		18.7%
1880	1,331		143.3%
1890	1,737		30.5%
1900	2,225		28.1%
1910	2,615		17.5%
1920	2,997		14.6%
1930	2,967		−1.0%
1940	3,608		21.6%
1950	4,072		12.9%
1960	4,371		7.3%
1970	4,585		4.9%
1980	5,038		9.9%
1990	5,834		15.8%
2000	7,827		34.2%
2010	9,200		17.5%
2020	9,984		8.5%
U.S. Decennial Census

=== 2020 census ===
As of the census of 2020, the population was 9,984. The population density was 1,684.8 inhabitants per square mile (650.5/km^{2}). There were 4,433 housing units at an average density of 748.1 units per square mile (288.8 units/km^{2}). The racial makeup of the city was 88.3% White, 1.3% Black or African American, 1.0% Native American, 0.7% Asian, 3.7% from other races, and 5.0% from two or more races. Ethnically, the population was 7.2% Hispanic or Latino of any race.

=== 2010 census ===
As of the census of 2010, there were 9,200 people, 3,795 households, and 2,357 families residing in the city. The population density was 1,578.0 inhabitants per square mile (609.3/km^{2}). There were 4,103 housing units at an average density of 703.8 units per square mile (271.7 units/km^{2}). The racial makeup of the city was 95.3% White, 0.6% African American, 1.0% Native American, 0.4% Asian, 1.6% from other races, and 1.1% from two or more races. Hispanic or Latino of any race were 4.3% of the population.

There were 3,795 households, of which 34.5% had children under the age of 18 living with them, 46.0% were married couples living together, 11.2% had a female householder with no husband present, 5.0% had a male householder with no wife present, and 37.9% were non-families. 31.9% of all households were made up of individuals, and 14.9% had someone living alone who was 65 years of age or older. The average household size was 2.41 and the average family size was 3.04.

The median age in the city was 35.7 years. 27% of residents were under the age of 18; 7.5% were between the ages of 18 and 24; 28.2% were from 25 to 44; 22.4% were from 45 to 64; and 14.9% were 65 years of age or older. The gender makeup of the city was 48.4% male and 51.6% female.

=== 2000 census ===
As of the census of 2000, there were 7,827 people, 3,193 households, and 2,021 families residing in the city. The population density was 1,503.9 people per square mile (580.7 people/km^{2}). There were 3,380 housing units 251.0/km^{2} (650/mi^{2}). The racial makeup of the city was 97.44% White, 0.17% Black or African American, 0.79% Native American, 0.19% Asian, 0.01% Pacific Islander, 0.61% from other races, and 0.78% from two or more races. 1.58% of the population were Hispanic or Latino of any race.

There were 3,193 households, out of which 32.9% had children under the age of 18 living with them, 49.1% were married couples living together, 9.8% had a female householder with no husband present, and 36.7% were non-families. 29.8% of all households were made up of individuals, and 14.5% had someone living alone who was 65 years of age or older. The average household size was 2.41 and the average family size was 13.01.

In the city, the population was spread out, with 26.7% under the age of 18, 8.5% from 18 to 24, 30.3% from 25 to 44, 18.2% from 45 to 64, and 16.2% who were 65 years of age or older. The median age was 35 years. For every 100 females, there were 92.8 males. For every 100 females age 18 and over, there were 87.4 males.

The median income for a household in the city was $39,152, and the median income for a family was $44,329. Males had a median income of $33,211 versus $21,973 for females. The per capita income for the city was $18,828. About 5.5% of families and 7.5% of the population were below the poverty line, including 7.3% of those under age 18 and 8.1% of those age 65 or over.

== Government ==
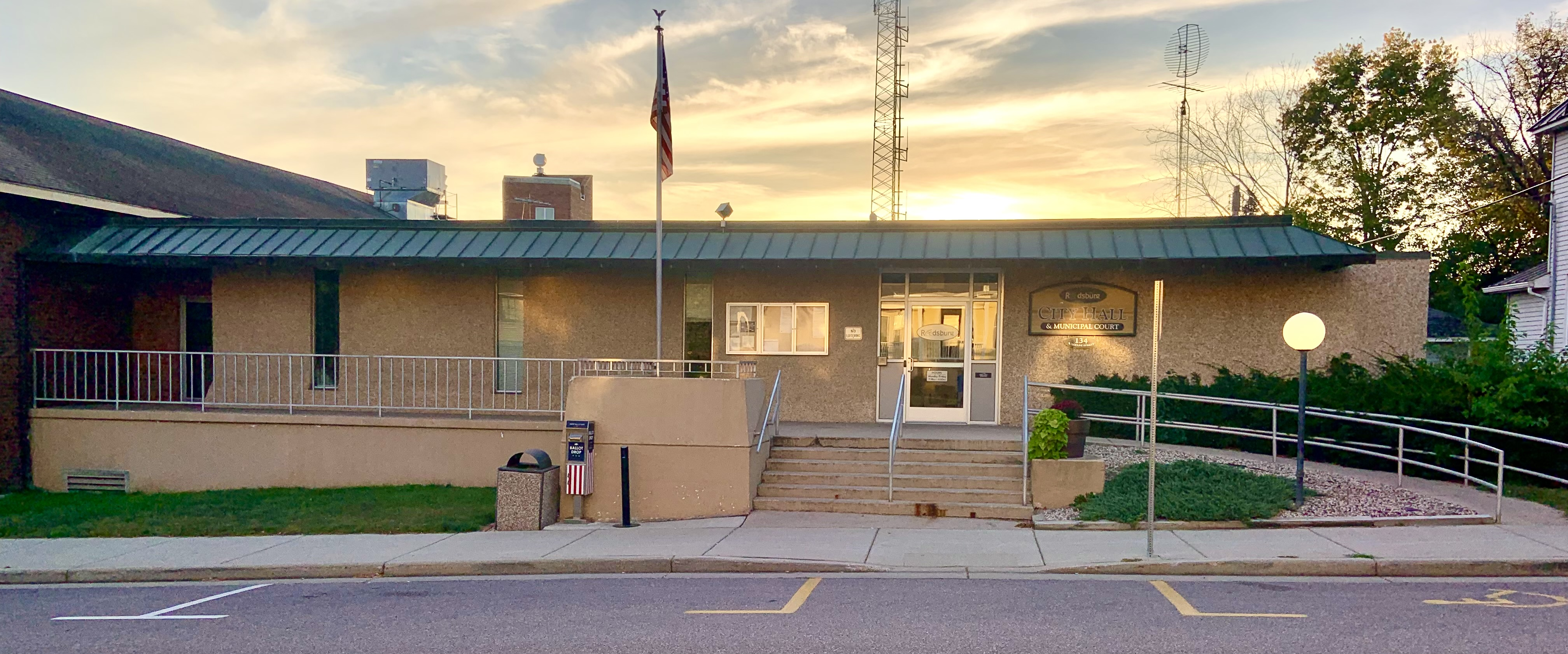
Reedsburg City Hall

Reedsburg operates under the mayor-council form of government, with each of four districts being represented by two aldermen, along with one at-large alderman. David Estes has served as the mayor since 2010. The city is managed by an appointed city administrator, which currently is Timothy Becker. The Reedsburg Police Department is the law enforcement agency in the city. The department was founded in 1868, and currently has 22 full time police officers.

== Infrastructure ==
The city includes the Main Street Commercial Historic District and the Park Street Historic District, which contain commercial and residential buildings built from 1873 to 1920. The Chicago and North Western Depot was built in 1906 which connected Reedsburg to the Twin Cities 400 line. Currently, it serves as the headquarters for the 400 State Trail, a biking and hiking trail that starts in Reedsburg and ends in Elroy, Wisconsin, following the old Twin Cities 400 track. Sound Devices is headquartered in Reedsburg.

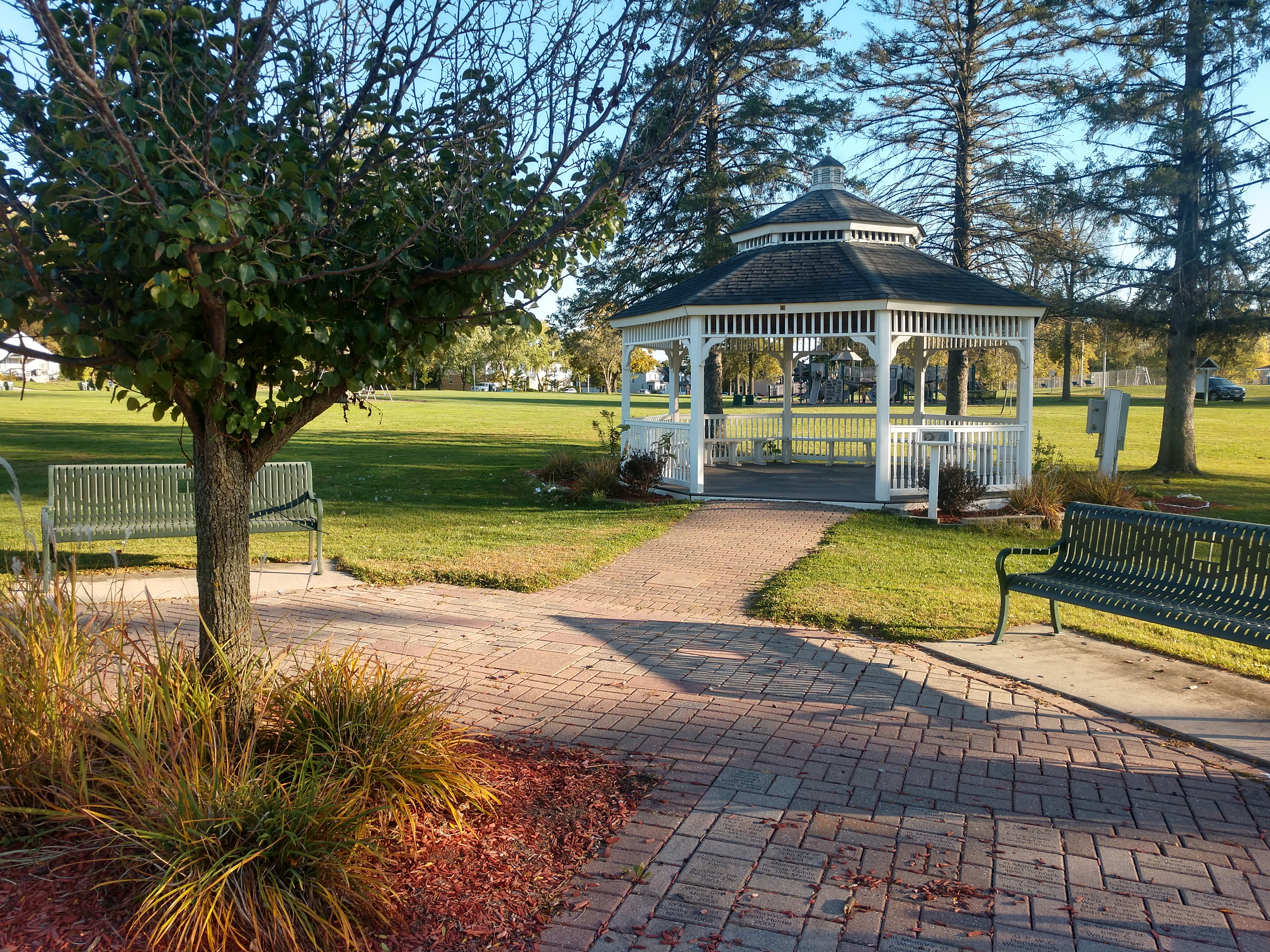
Webb Park

=== Parks ===
Reedsburg has 18 parks within the city. City Park is the oldest, being donated by the city's founder David C. Reed in 1848. Webb Park is another large park, being dedicated to Herbert H. Webb, a generous benefactor to Reedsburg. Webb Park includes the city's swimming pool and splash pad, and is adjacent to Webb Middle School. The woods behind Webb Park is called the Roger Popple Nature Area, which includes several trails, and the Half-Moon Lagoon Disc Golf Course.

=== Transportation ===
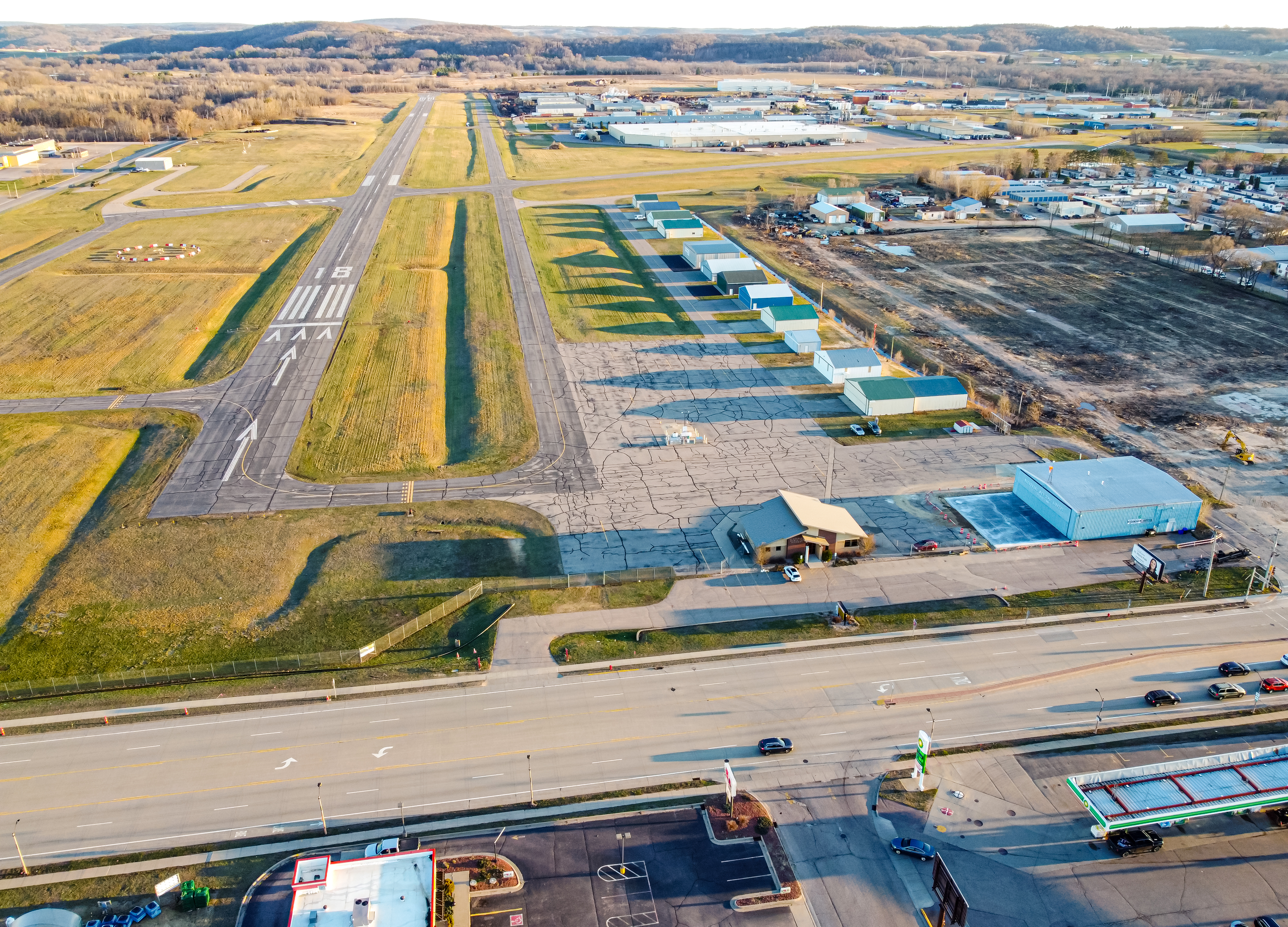
Reedsburg Municipal Airport

State Highways 33 and 23 run along Main Street. State Highway 136 terminates in Reedsburg. There is access to Interstate 90/94 nearby, and the city is served by the Reedsburg Municipal Airport (C35). Some city roads include bicycle lanes and there are posted bike routes through major areas of town. The Wisconsin and Southern Railroad operates on the old C&NW track. Dial-a-ride transit service is available through the Reedsburg Taxi Service.

== Education ==
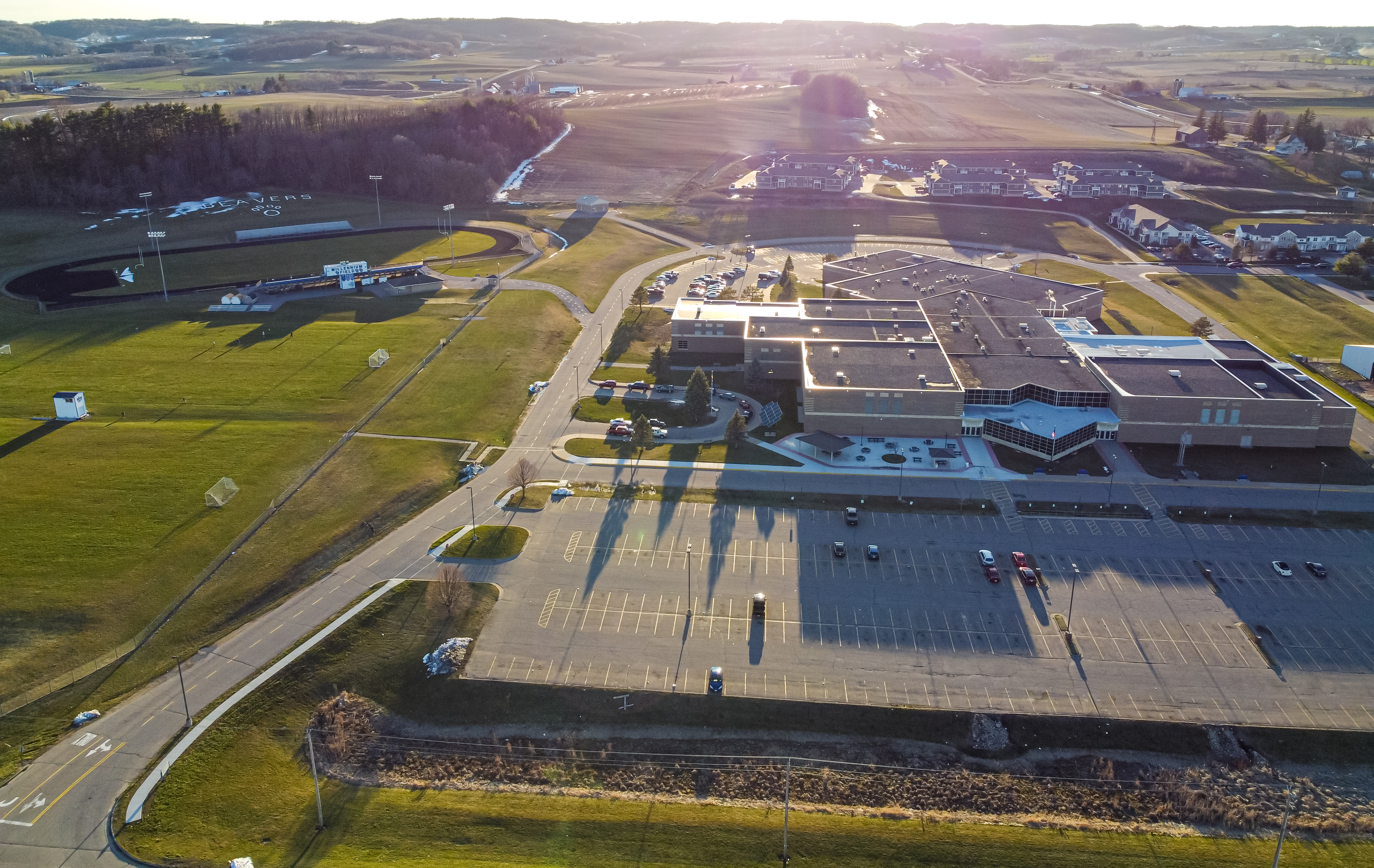
Reedsburg High School

The School District of Reedsburg has two elementary schools serving students in pre-kindergarten through grade 2, one intermediate school serving students in grade 3 through grade 5, one middle school, and one high school. There is a Madison Area Technical College regional campus on the west side of Reedsburg. The Reedsburg Public Library is located in the downtown and is a member of the South Central Library System. The University of Wisconsin–Platteville Baraboo Sauk County is in nearby Baraboo and serves Sauk County.

== Notable people ==
- Clare Briggs, comic strip artist
- Edward Dithmar, lieutenant governor of Wisconsin
- Alexander Preston Ellinwood, Wisconsin politician, businessman, and educator, lived in Reedsburg.
- John Harrington, professional football player
- Charlie Kavanagh, MLB player
- Timothy Mahr, composer and conductor, professor of music at St. Olaf College
- Agnes Moorehead, actress
- Saul Phillips, head coach of the North Dakota State Bison men's basketball team
- Albert O. Sorge, Wisconsin State Representative
- Henry W. Sorge, Wisconsin State Representative
- Warren Weaver, scientist
