= Reedsburg (town), Wisconsin =

Town of Reedsburg, Wisconsin
- Town
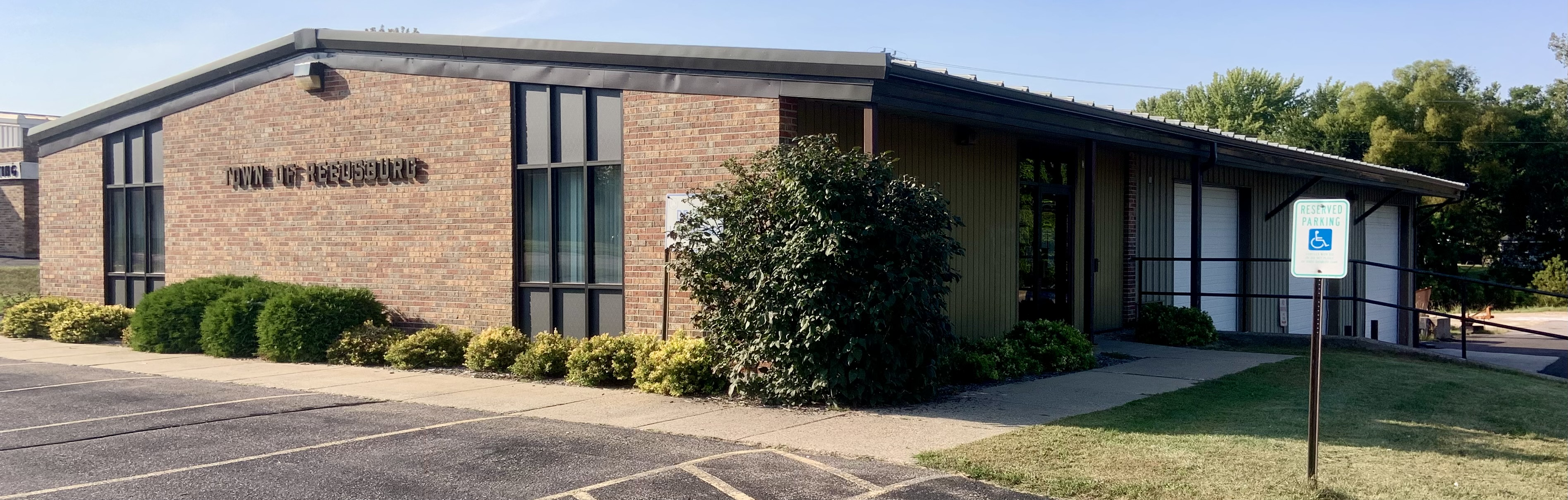
- Town hall

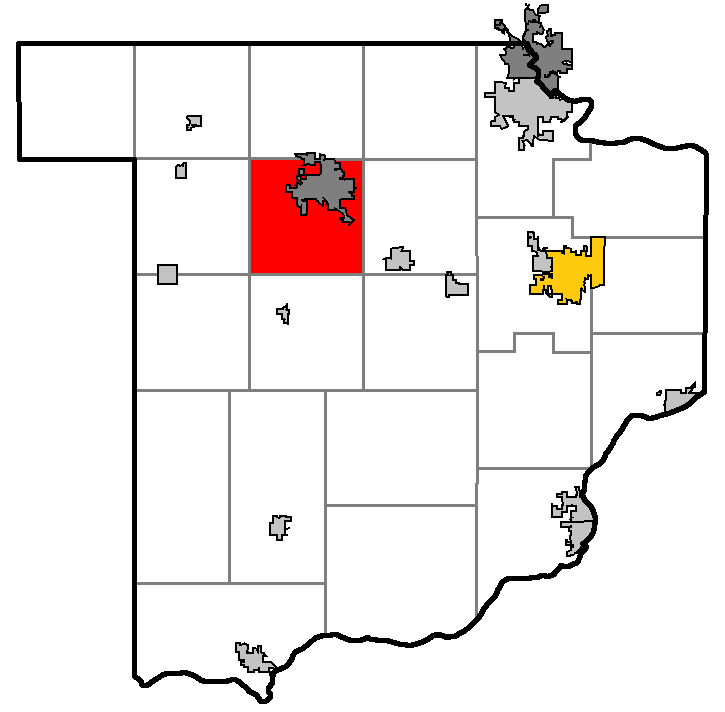
- Location of the Town of Reedsburg, Sauk County, Wisconsin

- Location of Sauk County, Wisconsin
- Coordinates: 43°31′13″N 90°0′23″W
- Country: United States
- State: Wisconsin
- County: Sauk

Area
  - Total: 30.8 sq mi (79.7 km^{2})
  - Land: 30.8 sq mi (79.7 km^{2})
  - Water: 0 sq mi (0.0 km^{2})
- Elevation: 1,079 ft (329 m)

Population (2020)
  - Total: 1,185
  - Density: 38.5/sq mi (14.9/km^{2})
- Time zone: UTC-6 (Central (CST))
  - Summer (DST): UTC-5 (CDT)
- Area code: 608
- FIPS code: 55-66825
- GNIS feature ID: 1584006
- Website: https://www.tn.reedsburg.wi.gov/

The Town of Reedsburg is located in Sauk County, Wisconsin, United States. The population was 1,185 at the 2020 census. The City of Reedsburg is located within the town, though it is politically independent.

== Geography ==
According to the United States Census Bureau, the town has a total area of 30.8 square miles (79.7 km^{2}), of which 30.8 square miles (79.6 km^{2}) is land and 0.03% is water.

== Demographics ==
As of the census of 2000, there were 1,236 people, 394 households, and 334 families residing in the town. The population density was 40.2 people per square mile (15.5/km^{2}). There were 415 housing units at an average density of 13.5 per square mile (5.2/km^{2}). The racial makeup of the town was 99.43% White, 0.32% Native American, 0.16% Asian, and 0.08% from two or more races. 0.40% of the population were Hispanic or Latino of any race.

There were 394 households, out of which 33.5% had children under the age of 18 living with them, 77.2% were married couples living together, 4.3% had a female householder with no husband present, and 15.2% were non-families. 11.7% of all households were made up of individuals, and 5.3% had someone living alone who was 65 years of age or older. The average household size was 2.78 and the average family size was 3.01.

In the town, the population was spread out, with 22.9% under the age of 18, 5.8% from 18 to 24, 23.9% from 25 to 44, 25.9% from 45 to 64, and 21.4% who were 65 years of age or older. The median age was 43 years. For every 100 females, there were 96.5 males. For every 100 females age 18 and over, there were 97.3 males.

The median income for a household in the town was $49,236, and the median income for a family was $50,455. Males had a median income of $33,304 versus $22,177 for females. The per capita income for the town was $19,658. About 4.1% of families and 6.1% of the population were below the poverty line, including 8.6% of those under age 18 and 5.9% of those age 65 or over.
