= Copper Creek (Wisconsin) =

Stream in Sauk County, Wisconsin, U.S.

Coordinates: 43°30′58″N 89°56′34″W

Copper Creek is a stream in Sauk County, Wisconsin, in the United States.

Copper Creek was named from deposits of copper ore that were mined there.

== See also ==
- List of rivers of Wisconsin
