= Baraboo River =

River in Wisconsin, United States

Coordinates: 43.4875°N 89.4417°W

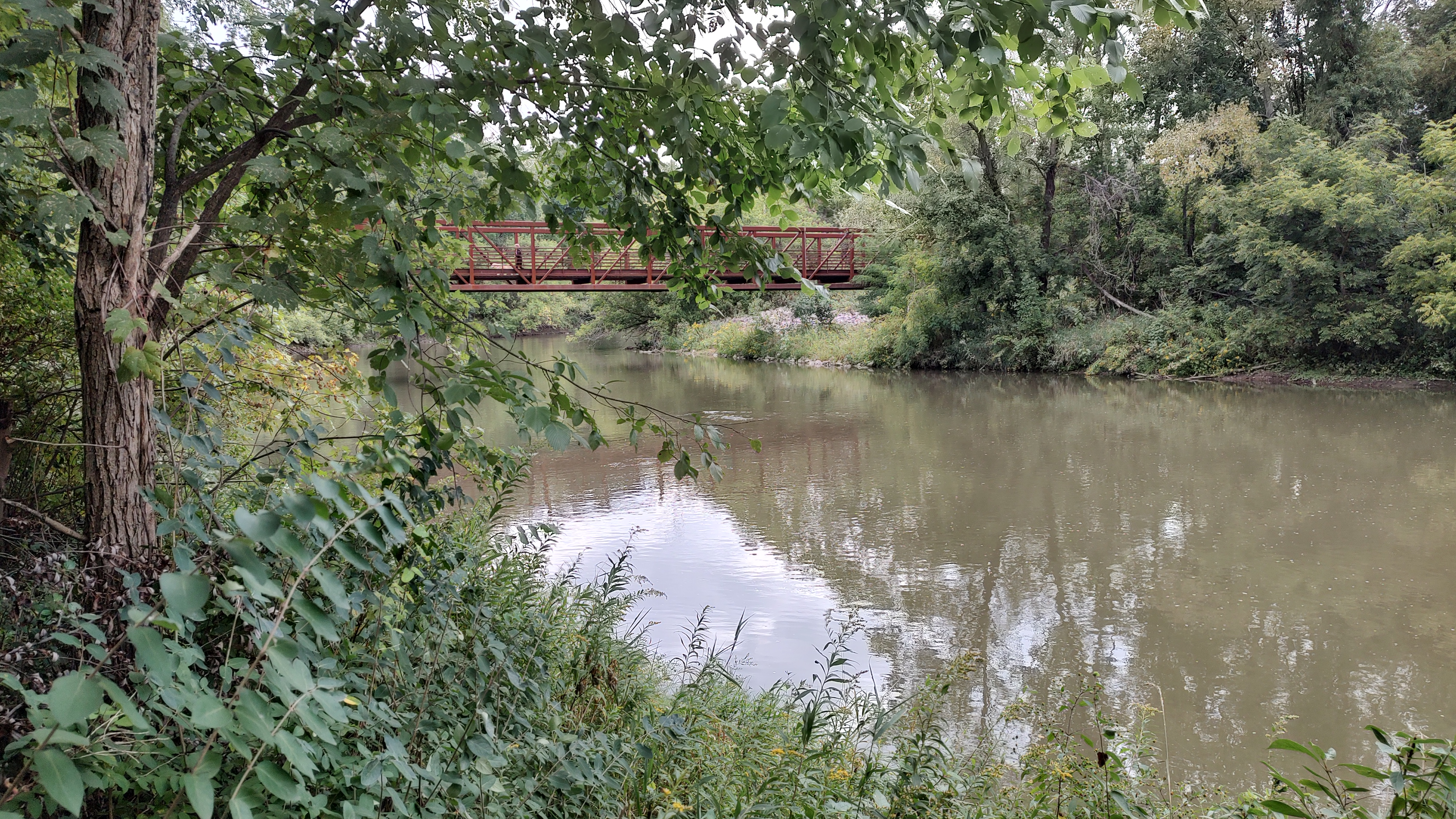
Baraboo River at Spirit Point in Baraboo, Wisconsin

The Baraboo River /ˈbærəbuː/ is a tributary of the Wisconsin River, in south-central Wisconsin in the United States. Via the Wisconsin River, it is part of the watershed of the Mississippi River. The Baraboo River also has one of the longest stretches of free-flowing (or "wild") river in the United States, with the removal of four dams in the 1990s leading to 112 miles of unimpeded river flow.

== Etymology ==
The Baraboo River is theorized to have been named after a French trader in the area, Francois Barbeau, although it may also be a corruption of a different French word or phrase. The city of Baraboo, Wisconsin is named after the Baraboo River.

== Course ==
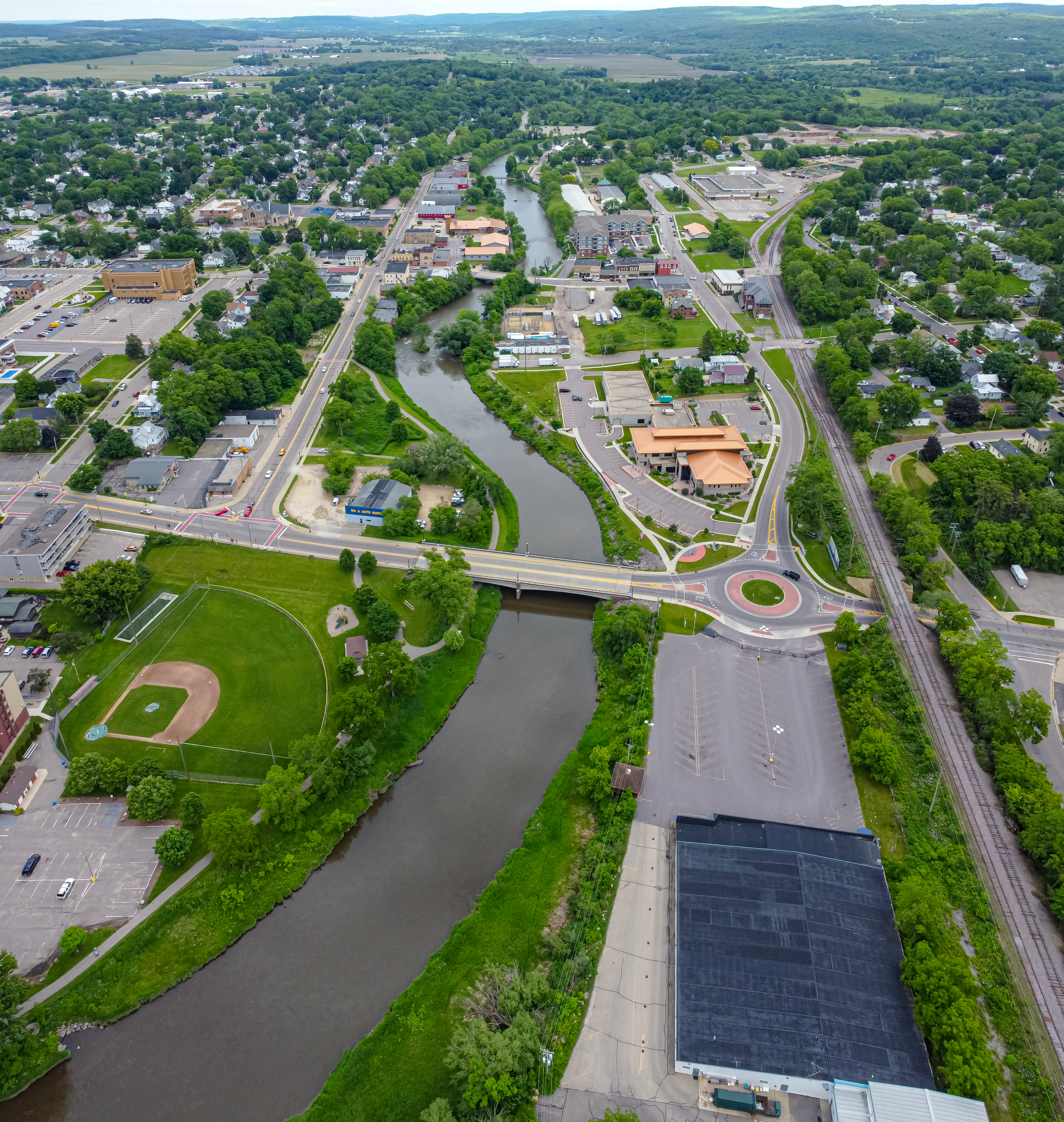
Baraboo River through Baraboo

The Baraboo River rises in southeastern Monroe County and flows generally southeastwardly through Juneau, Sauk and Columbia Counties, past Kendall, Elroy, Union Center, Wonewoc, La Valle, Reedsburg, Rock Springs, North Freedom, West Baraboo and Baraboo. It flows into the Wisconsin River from the west, about 3 mi (5 km) south of Portage.

In its upper course above Elroy, the river is paralleled by the Elroy-Sparta Bike Trail.

== Tributaries ==
- At Union Center, the river collects the West Branch Baraboo River, which rises in eastern Vernon County and flows generally eastwardly past Hillsboro.
- Just downstream of La Valle, the river collects the Little Baraboo River, which rises in eastern Vernon County and flows generally eastwardly past Ironton. Along its course the Little Baraboo River briefly enters Richland County.

== See also ==
- List of Wisconsin rivers
