= Suburban Six-Man Football League =

Wisconsin high school football conference (1939-1957)

The Suburban Six-Man Football League is a former high school football conference with its catchment in the Madison metropolitan area. Originating in 1939 and playing its last season in 1957, the conference's member schools were affiliated with the Wisconsin Interscholastic Athletic Association.

== History ==
=== 1939–1942 ===
Location of Original Dane-Columbia Six-Man Football League Members

The Suburban Six-Man Football League was formed in 1939 as the Dane-Columbia Six-Man Football League by three small high schools in south central Wisconsin. All three schools played six-man football and belonged to conferences which either did not sponsor the sport (Cambria and Poynette of the Dual County Conference) or sponsored eleven-man football (Deerfield of the Madison Suburban Conference). Deerfield left for the 1940 football season to compete as an independent, with DeForest and Fox Lake taking their place in the newly renamed South Central Four. It wasn't until the 1941 football season that the conference would adopt the Suburban Six-Man Football League moniker. That season, membership increased from four to ten schools. Along with Deerfield's reentry into the conference, the Suburban Six-Man Football League accepted three members associated with the Tri-County League (Black Earth, Mazomanie and Waunakee), two from the State Line League (Belleville and Brooklyn) and Verona of the Madison Suburban Conference. Brooklyn left the conference in 1942 when they dropped football from their interscholastic athletic offerings, which along with Poynette's exit reduced membership to eight schools. Competition in the Suburban Six-Man Football League was suspended for the 1943 season amid gasoline rationing for the World War II effort.

=== 1944–1950 ===
Location of Suburban Six-Man Football League Members (1944-1946)

The Suburban Six-Man Football League resumed play for the 1944 season, welcoming back all eight members from the 1942 season, along with Poynette (who last played in the conference in 1941) and newcomers Argyle, whose primary affiliation was with the State Line League. The league partitioned into Eastern and Western sections with the increase in membership:

Eastern Section	Western Section
Cambria	Argyle
Deerfield	Belleville
DeForest	Black Earth
Poynette	Mazomanie
Waunakee	Verona

This configuration was maintained for three seasons (1944-1946) before new conferences began to adopt six-man football and changed the league's makeup. Argyle and Belleville left to join the State Line League, and Cambria became Dual County Conference members for six-man football. Johnson Creek and Marshall took the place of the departing schools after competing as independents the year prior. For the 1948 season, Marshall declined to offer six-man football and Poynette left to become full members in the Dual County Conference. The 1949 season saw a significant turnover of member schools as four schools adopted eleven-man football and most joined their respective conferences. Mazomanie and Waunakee entered football competition in the Tri-County League, DeForest became football members of the Madison Suburban Conference and Verona competed as an independent for one season before joining the Madison Suburban Conference a year later. Marshall reinstated their six-man football team to bring membership to four schools for the 1949 season.

=== 1950–1957 ===
Location of Final Suburban Eight-Man Football League Members

As member schools continued to adopt eleven-man football when they grew in enrollment size, the Suburban Six-Man Football League continued to see membership turnover for the remainder of their history. A fifth member joined the conference for the 1950 season (Hustisford), but membership decreased back to four schools for the 1951 season when Johnson Creek transitioned to eleven-man football and joined the Madison Suburban Conference. Norris Foundation in Mukwonago joined the league for the 1953 season, bringing the roster to five schools. The conference would compete in six-man football for one more season before moving to eight-man football in 1954, along with a name change to the Suburban Eight-Man Football League. Black Earth and Hustisford left the league after the 1954 football season, whittling the group to only three members. The Suburban Eight-Man Football League played for three more seasons after being disbanded following the 1957 football season. Deerfield and Marshall played in the Southern Regional Conference's final eight-man football season in 1958, and both schools went on to form the Southern Dairyland Conference with Johnson Creek and Palmyra for the 1959 season. Norris Foundation would become members of the Southern Dairyland in 1960 after playing the 1959 season as an independent.

== Conference membership history ==
School	Location	Affiliation	Mascot	Colors	Seasons	Conference Joined	Primary Conference
Cambria	Cambria, WI	Public	Hilltoppers		1939–1946	Dual County	Dual County
Deerfield	Deerfield, WI	Public	Demons		1939,. 1941–1957	Southern Regional	Madison Suburban
Poynette	Poynette, WI	Public	Indians		1939–1941, 1944-1947	Dual County	Dual County
DeForest	DeForest, WI	Public	Norskies		1940–1948	Madison Suburban	Madison Suburban
Fox Lake	Fox Lake, WI	Public	Lakers		1940	Independent	Dual County
Belleville	Belleville, WI	Public	Wildcats		1941–1946	State Line	State Line
Brooklyn	Brooklyn, WI	Public	Hornets		1941	Suspended football program	State Line
Black Earth	Black Earth, WI	Public	Earthmen		1941–1954	Iowa County	Tri-County
Mazomanie	Mazomanie, WI	Public	Midgets		1941–1948	Tri-County	Tri-County
Verona	Verona, WI	Public	Indians		1941–1948	Independent	Madison Suburban
Waunakee	Waunakee, WI	Public	Warriors		1941–1948	Tri-County	Tri-County
Argyle	Argyle, WI	Public	Orioles		1944–1946	State Line	State Line
Johnson Creek	Johnson Creek, WI	Public	Bluejays		1947–1950	Madison Suburban	Madison Suburban
Marshall	Marshall, WI	Public	Cardinals		1947, 1949-1957	Southern Regional	Madison Suburban
Hustisford	Hustisford, WI	Public	Falcons		1950–1954	Fox Valley Tri-County	Independent
Norris Foundation	Mukwonago, WI	Public, Alternative	Nors'men		1953–1957	Southern Regional	Southeastern Wisconsin

== Membership timeline ==
Eastern Section Western Section

== List of conference champions ==
School	Quantity	Years
DeForest	4	1941, 1944, 1945, 1946
Mazomanie	4	1945, 1946, 1947, 1948
Deerfield	3	1942, 1952, 1955
Cambria	2	1939, 1940
Johnson Creek	2	1949, 1950
Marshall	2	1956, 1957
Norris Foundation	2	1953, 1954
Belleville	1	1944
Hustisford	1	1951
Argyle	0	
Black Earth	0	
Brooklyn	0	
Fox Lake	0	
Poynette	0	
Verona	0	
Waunakee	0	
