= Eastern Suburban Football Conference =

Wisconsin high school football conference

The Eastern Suburban Football Conference is a high school football conference with its members located east of the Madison metropolitan area. Founded in 2020 and administered by the Capitol Conference, its member schools are affiliated with the Wisconsin Interscholastic Athletic Association.

== History ==
Location of Current Eastern Suburban Football Conference Members

In February 2019, the WIAA and the Wisconsin Football Coaches Association unveiled a full football-only realignment for Wisconsin's high school athletic conferences. This arrangement was set to begin with the 2020 football season and run on a two-year cycle. The Eastern Suburban Conference name, dormant since the all-sport conference was disbanded in 2001, was resurrected for an eight-member conference including Cambridge, Clinton, Dodgeland, Markesan, Marshall, Palmyra-Eagle, Pardeeville and Waterloo. Six members of the new conference (Cambridge, Dodgeland, Marshall, Palmyra-Eagle, Pardeeville and Waterloo) were also members of the previous conference's football alignment from 1991 to 2000. The new conference was originally referred to as the Capitol Small in preseason realignment materials, but was renamed before starting play and is part of the Capitol Conference's organizational structure. In 2022, Pardeeville exited the Eastern Suburban to join the Trailways Conference, where they had full affiliation. They were replaced by Horicon/Hustisford, formerly of the Capitol Conference for football. Four schools left the Eastern Suburban Conference for the 2024-2025 cycle: Clinton, Dodgeland, Horicon/Hustisford and Palmyra-Eagle. Two outgoing members joined the Capitol Conference (Clinton and Horicon/Hustisford) and two attained full membership in the Trailways Conference (Dodgeland and Palmyra-Eagle). They were replaced by three schools formerly in the Trailways Conference (Deerfield, Fall River/Rio, Pardeeville and Poynette). For the 2026-2027 cycle, the Trailways Conference is whittling down to seven members, losing Deerfield and Fall River/Rio to the Trailways Conference and replacing them with Belleville (SWAL) and Horicon/Hustisford (Capitol). The latter school makes its return from the Capitol Conference, where they were associate members for the previous cycle. 2026 will be the final season for the Horicon/Hustisford football co-operative, after it was announced that Hustisford would close its doors at the end of the 2026-27 school year.

== List of conference members ==
=== Current members ===
School	Location	Affiliation	Enrollment	Mascot	Colors	Joined	Primary Conference
Belleville	Belleville, WI	Public	265	Wildcats		2026	Capitol
Cambridge	Cambridge, WI	Public	294	Bluejays		2020	Capitol
Horicon/ Hustisford	Horicon, WI	Public	306	Marshmen		2022, 2026	Trailways
Markesan	Markesan, WI	Public	253	Hornets		2020	Trailways
Marshall	Marshall, WI	Public	254	Cardinals		2020	Capitol
Pardeeville	Pardeeville, WI	Public	272	Bulldogs		2020, 2024	Trailways
Poynette	Poynette, WI	Public	289	Pumas		2024	Capitol
Waterloo	Waterloo, WI	Public	233	Pirates		2020	Capitol

=== Former members ===
School	Location	Affiliation	Mascot	Colors	Seasons	Primary Conference
Clinton	Clinton, WI	Public	Cougars		2020–2023	Rock Valley
Deerfield	Deerfield, WI	Public	Demons		2024–2025	Trailways
Dodgeland	Juneau, WI	Public	Trojans		2020–2023	Trailways
Fall River/ Rio	Fall River, WI	Public	Rebels		2024–2025	Trailways
Palmyra-Eagle	Palmyra, WI	Public	Panthers		2020–2023	Trailways

== List of conference champions ==
School	Quantity	Years
Marshall	4	2020, 2021, 2022, 2023
Cambridge	2	2024, 2026
Belleville	1	2026
Horicon/ Hustisford	1	2023
Markesan	1	2025
Pardeeville	1	2026
Clinton	0	
Deerfield	0	
Dodgeland	0	
Fall River/ Rio	0	
Palmyra-Eagle	0	
Poynette	0	
Waterloo	0	
