= Tri-County League =

Wisconsin high school athletic conference (1923-1963)

The Tri-County League is a former high school athletic conference in Wisconsin, operational from 1923 to 1963 with its membership concentrated in south central Wisconsin. All members belonged to the Wisconsin Interscholastic Athletic Association.

== History ==
Location of Tri-County League Members (1954–1962)

The Tri-County League began in 1923 as an oratorical and forensics conference between five small high schools in south central Wisconsin: Arena, Black Earth, Mazomanie, Prairie du Sac and Sauk City. These five schools were concentrated in the lower Wisconsin River Valley across three counties: Dane, Iowa and Sauk. The loop began sponsorship of athletic competition in 1926, and in 1928 added two new members: Spring Green and Waunakee. The Tri-County League started sponsorship of eleven-man football in 1930 with four members: Arena, Mazomanie, Sauk City and Spring Green. Lodi joined the Tri-County League in 1932 from the Madison Suburban Conference, and the conference maintained a steady eight-school roster for the next two decades. Poynette and Verona joined from the Dual County and Madison Suburban Conferences in 1954, bringing conference membership to ten schools.

Over the next decade, consolidation of rural school districts in south central Wisconsin hit Tri-County League membership hard, leading to its eventual demise. In 1962, River Valley High School was created from the consolidation of high schools in Spring Green, Arena and Lone Rock. They took the place of Arena and Spring Green in the conference. The next year, two new school districts affecting Tri-County League membership were created: Sauk Prairie (from Prairie du Sac and Sauk City) and Wisconsin Heights (from Black Earth and Mazomanie). The new Sauk Prairie High School joined the South Central Conference in the same year it was created, leaving only six schools in the conference for the 1963-64 school year. Because of the decline in member schools, the Tri-County League merged with the Madison Suburban Conference, with all six schools (Lodi, Poynette, River Valley, Verona, Waunakee, and Wisconsin Heights) comprising the Western Section of the conference.

== Conference membership history ==
=== Final members ===
School	Location	Affiliation	Mascot	Colors	Joined	Left	Conference Joined	Current Conference
Black Earth	Black Earth, WI	Public	Earthmen		1923	1963	Closed (consolidated into Wisconsin Heights)	
Lodi	Lodi, WI	Public	Blue Devils		1932	1963	Madison Suburban	Capitol
Mazomanie	Mazomanie, WI	Public	Midgets		1923	1963	Closed (consolidated into Wisconsin Heights)	
Poynette	Poynette, WI	Public	Indians		1954	1963	Madison Suburban	Capitol
Prairie du Sac	Prairie du Sac, WI	Public	Indians		1923	1963	Closed (consolidated into Sauk Prairie)	
River Valley	Spring Green, WI	Public	Blackhawks		1962	1963	Madison Suburban	Southwest Wisconsin
Sauk City	Sauk City, WI	Public	Cardinals		1923	1963	Closed (consolidated into Sauk Prairie)	
Verona	Verona, WI	Public	Indians		1954	1963	Madison Suburban	Big Eight
Waunakee	Waunakee, WI	Public	Warriors		1928	1963	Madison Suburban	Badger

=== Previous members ===
School	Location	Affiliation	Mascot	Colors	Joined	Left	Conference Joined	Current Conference
Arena	Arena, WI	Public	Purple Knights		1923	1962	Closed (consolidated into River Valley)	
Spring Green	Spring Green, WI	Public	Shamrocks		1923	1962	Closed (consolidated into River Valley)	

== List of state champions ==
=== Fall sports ===
None

=== Winter sports ===
Curling
School	Year	Division
Lodi	1962	Single Division
Poynette	1963	Single Division

=== Spring sports ===
Boys Track & Field
School	Year	Division
Prairie du Sac	1929	Class C
Prairie du Sac	1930	Class C
Prairie du Sac	1931	Class C

== List of conference champions ==
=== Boys Basketball ===
School	Quantity	Years
Spring Green	10	1932, 1936, 1938, 1939, 1943, 1944, 1952, 1953, 1955, 1958
Prairie du Sac	8	1935, 1940, 1941, 1949, 1951, 1952, 1955, 1959
Lodi	7	1933, 1934, 1937, 1938, 1942, 1950, 1963
Mazomanie	6	1932, 1934, 1945, 1946, 1947, 1948
Sauk City	5	1949, 1955, 1956, 1957, 1960
Waunakee	3	1931, 1961, 1962
Black Earth	1	1954
Verona	1	1963
Arena	0	
Poynette	0	
River Valley	0	
Champions from 1929-1931 unknown

=== Football ===
School	Quantity	Years
Prairie du Sac	9	1939, 1940, 1941, 1944, 1950, 1951, 1952, 1954, 1957
Sauk City	7	1936, 1944, 1947, 1948, 1949, 1952, 1956
Spring Green	7	1930, 1931, 1933, 1935, 1938, 1942, 1943
Waunakee	6	1953, 1958, 1959, 1960, 1961, 1962
Arena	2	1945, 1946
Mazomanie	2	1934, 1937
Lodi	1	1939
Verona	1	1955
Black Earth	0	
Poynette	0	
River Valley	0	
Champions from 1932 unknown
