= Capitol Conference (Wisconsin) =

Wisconsin high school athletic conference

The Capitol Conference is a high school athletic conference in south central Wisconsin. It was founded in 1969, and its member schools are affiliated with the Wisconsin Interscholastic Athletic Association (WIAA).

== History ==
=== 1969-1994 ===
Location of Original Capitol Conference Members

The Capitol Conference was formed in 1969 after the breakup of the larger Madison Suburban Conference into three separate organizations. Six of its original members came from the conference's Western section (Lodi, McFarland, Poynette, Verona, Waunakee and Wisconsin Heights) and two came from the Central section (DeForest and Waterloo). In 1977, Poynette left to rejoin the Dual County Conference (having previously been a member from 1926 to 1954) and Waterloo became a member of the Eastern Suburban Conference. Two schools moved over from the Central Suburban Conference (Columbus and Lake Mills) to take their place and keep the conference at eight member schools. Mount Horeb joined the Capitol Conference after leaving the Southern Eight Conference in 1983, replacing Lake Mills, who briefly joined the Eastern Suburban Conference. In 1987, DeForest and Waunakee left to become the newest members of the Badger Conference with Lake Mills and Poynette rejoining the Capitol Conference as their replacements.

=== 1994-2006 ===
By 1994, the Verona Area School District was the fastest-growing district in the Madison area, and they were invited to enter the Badger Conference with an eye towards continued future growth. Lakeside Lutheran in Lake Mills took their place in 1995 after leaving the Eastern Suburban Conference, renewing their crosstown rivalry with Lake Mills. Cambridge, Marshall and Waterloo followed Lakeside Lutheran out of the Eastern Suburban in 2001, offsetting the loss of Lodi and Poynette to the South Central Conference and McFarland and Mount Horeb to the Badger Conference. For Waterloo, this was their second stint in the conference after having been a member from 1969 to 1977. The Capitol Conference would remain a seven-member league for the next five years before major changes would occur.

=== 2006-present ===
In 2006, the Capitol Conference reached its high of twelve member schools when Lodi and Poynette rejoined from the South Central Conference, Belleville and New Glarus came over from the Six Rivers Conference and Luther Prep in Watertown was added after being displaced from the Parkland Conference when it ceased operations. With the addition of the new schools came realignment into the Capitol North and Capitol South divisions:

Capitol North	Capitol South
Columbus	Belleville
Lake Mills	Cambridge
Lakeside Lutheran	Marshall
Lodi	New Glarus
Luther Prep	Waterloo
Poynette	Wisconsin Heights

This alignment stayed intact for sixteen years before Luther Prep exited the conference to rejoin the Midwest Classic Conference in 2023. In 2025, Waupun joined from the disbanded East Central Conference, taking Luther Prep's place in the Capitol North. For the 2027-28 school year, the WIAA's Board of Controls approved a move by Portage from the Badger Conference Small Schools division to the Capitol Conference as its thirteenth member.

=== Football-only alignment ===
In February 2019, in conjunction with the Wisconsin Football Coaches Association, the WIAA released a sweeping football-only realignment for Wisconsin to commence with the 2020 football season and run on a two-year cycle. Eight schools were designated as football members for the Capitol Conference: Big Foot, Columbus, Horicon/Hustisford, Lake Mills, Lakeside Lutheran, Lodi, Luther Prep and Turner. The Capitol Conference also operates a small-school division consisting of Cambridge, Clinton, Dodgeland, Markesan, Marshall, Palmyra-Eagle, Pardeeville and Waterloo. This conference competes under the Eastern Suburban Conference banner, which was the name of an all-sport conference that last played in 2001. Several schools entering the Capitol Conference for football had primary affiliations with the Rock Valley and Trailways Conferences. In 2022, Horicon/Hustisford moved over to the Eastern Suburban Conference and Luther Prep left to join the Midwest Classic Conference. The six remaining schools in the Capitol Conference welcomed Edgewood from the Rock Valley Conference and New Glarus/Monticello from the Southwest Wisconsin Conference to bring the roster to eight schools. Three schools left the Capitol Conference football alignment in 2024: Edgewood and Lakeside Lutheran left the Capitol Conference as football members in 2024 to join the Badger Conference, and New Glarus returned to the Southwest Wisconsin Conference after a two-year absence. The two outgoing schools were replaced by Clinton and Horicon/Hustisford, with the latter making their return from the Eastern Suburban Conference. The Capitol Conference will be receiving a massive overhaul to their football roster for the 2026-27 cycle, losing former associate members Big Foot, Clinton and Turner to full affiliation with the Rock Valley Conference and Horicon/Hustisford to a return to the Eastern Suburban Conference. They will be replaced by former Badger Conference members Lakeside Lutheran and Portage and two schools from the Rock Valley Conference (Edgerton and Jefferson). The conference will also be gaining a scheduling partner in the Rock Valley, with one mandatory crossover game per season counting towards conference standings.

== List of conference members ==
=== Current full members ===
School	Location	Affiliation	Enrollment	Mascot	Colors	Joined	Division
Belleville	Belleville, WI	Public	265	Wildcats		2006	South
Cambridge	Cambridge, WI	Public	294	Bluejays		2001	South
Columbus	Columbus, WI	Public	385	Cardinals		1977	North
Lake Mills (Note: Left the Capitol Conference in 1983, returned in 1987)	Lake Mills, WI	Public	436	L-Cats		1977, 1987	North
Lakeside Lutheran	Lake Mills, WI	Private (Lutheran, WELS)	566	Warriors		1995	North
Lodi (Note: Left the Capitol Conference in 2001, returned in 2006)	Lodi, WI	Public	429	Blue Devils		1969, 2006	North
Marshall	Marshall, WI	Public	254	Cardinals		2001	South
New Glarus	New Glarus, WI	Public	308	Glarner Knights		2006	South
Poynette (Note: Left the Capitol Conference in 1977, returned in 1987)	Poynette, WI	Public	289	Pumas		1969, 1987, 2006	North
Waterloo (Note: Left the Capitol Conference in 1977, returned in 2001)	Waterloo, WI	Public	233	Pirates		1969, 2001	South
Waupun	Waupun, WI	Public	568	Warriors		2025	North
Wisconsin Heights	Mazomanie, WI	Public	226	Vanguards		1969	South

=== Current associate members ===
School	Location	Affiliation	Mascot	Colors	Primary Conference	Sport(s)
Deerfield	Deerfield, WI	Public	Demons		Trailways	Boys Cross Country, (Note: Co-operative with Cambridge) Girls Cross Country,Boys Soccer, Girls Soccer
Edgerton	Edgerton, WI	Public	Crimson Tide		Rock Valley	Football
Jefferson	Jefferson, WI	Public	Eagles		Rock Valley	Football
Luther Prep	Watertown, WI	Private (WELS)	Phoenix		Midwest Classic	Girls Tennis
Mayville	Mayville, WI	Public	Cardinals		Wisconsin Flyway	Girls Tennis
Monticello	Monticello, WI	Public	Ponies		Six Rivers	Boys Golf (Note: Co-operative with Belleville)
Portage	Portage, WI	Public	Warriors		Badger	Football
Wayland Academy	Beaver Dam, WI	Private (Nonsectarian)	Big Red		Trailways	Girls Tennis

=== Current co-operative members ===
Team	Colors	Host School	Co-operative Members	Sport(s)
Sugar River Raiders		Belleville	Monticello (wrestling only), New Glarus	Boys Soccer, Girls Soccer, Boys Wrestling, Girls Wrestling
United Soccer		Deerfield	Cambridge, Waterloo	Boys Soccer, Girls Soccer

=== Future full members ===
School	Location	Affiliation	Enrollment	Mascot	Colors	Joining	Former Conference
Portage	Portage, WI	Public	600	Warriors		2027	Badger

=== Former full members ===
School	Location	Affiliation	Mascot	Colors	Joined	Left	Conference Joined	Current Conference
DeForest	DeForest, WI	Public	Norskies		1969	1987	Badger	
Luther Prep	Watertown, WI	Public (Lutheran, WELS)	Phoenix		2006	2023	Midwest Classic	
McFarland	McFarland, WI	Public	Spartans		1969	2001	Badger	
Mount Horeb	Mount Horeb, WI	Public	Vikings		1983	2001	Badger	
Verona	Verona, WI	Public	Wildcats		1969	1994	Badger	Big Eight
Waunakee	Waunakee, WI	Public	Warriors		1969	1987	Badger	

=== Former football-only members ===
School	Location	Affiliation	Mascot	Colors	Seasons	Primary Conference
Big Foot	Walworth, WI	Public	Chiefs		2020-2025	Rock Valley
Clinton	Clinton, WI	Public	Cougars		2024-2025	Rock Valley
Edgewood	Madison, WI	Private (Catholic)	Crusaders		2022-2023	Badger
Horicon/ Hustisford	Horicon, WI	Public	Marshmen		2020-2021, 2024-2025	Trailways
Turner	Beloit, WI	Public	Trojans		2020-2025	Rock Valley

== Membership timeline ==
Capitol North Capitol South

=== Football members ===
Capitol North Capitol South

== Membership map ==
Capitol Conference
Location of Capitol Conference full members:
1 Belleville
2 Cambridge
3 Columbus
4 Lake Mills
5 Lakeside Lutheran
6 Lodi
7 Marshall
8 New Glarus
9 Poynette
10 Waterloo
11 Waupun
12 Wisconsin Heights

== Sponsored sports ==
	Baseball	Boys Basketball	Girls Basketball	Boys Cross Country	Girls Cross Country	Football	Boys Golf	Boys Soccer	Girls Soccer	Softball	Girls Tennis	Boys Track & Field	Girls Track & Field	Girls Volleyball	Boys Wrestling	Girls Wrestling
Belleville	●	●	●	●	●			● (Note: Sugar River Raiders co-operative)	●	●		●	●	●	●	●
Cambridge	●	●	●				●	● (Note: United Soccer co-operative)	●	●		●	●	●	●	●
Columbus	●	●	●	●	●	●	(Note: Co-operative with Fall River)	●	●	●	●	●	●	●	●	●
Lake Mills	●	●	●	●	●	●	●	●	●	●	●	●	●	●	●	●
Lakeside Lutheran	●	●	●	●	●	●	●	●	●	●		●	●	●	●	●
Lodi	●	●	●	●	●	●	●	●	●	●	●	●	●	●	●	●
Marshall	●	●	●	●	●					●		●	●	●	●	●
New Glarus	●	●	●	● (Note: Co-operative with Monticello)	●		●					●	●	●		
Poynette	●	●	●	●	●					●		●	●	●	●	●
Waterloo	●	●	●	●	●					●		●	●	●	●	●
Waupun	●	●	●	●	●		●	●	●	●	●	●	●	●	●	●
Wisconsin Heights	●	●	●	● (Note: Co-operative with Barneveld)	●		●	●	●	●		●	●	●		

== List of state champions ==
=== Fall sports ===
Boys Cross Country
School	Year	Division
Wisconsin Heights	1973	Small Schools
Verona	1974	Class B
Verona	1982	Class B
Verona	1991	Division 2
McFarland	1996	Division 2
Lakeside Lutheran	1999	Division 2 (WISAA)
Lakeside Lutheran	2023	Division 2

Girls Cross Country
School	Year	Division
Verona	1980	Class B
Verona	1981	Class B
Mount Horeb	1983	Class B
Verona	1984	Class B
Mount Horeb	1990	Division 2
Mount Horeb	1994	Division 2
Mount Horeb	1995	Division 2
Lakeside Lutheran	2007	Division 2

Football
School	Year	Division
DeForest	1982	Division 4
Columbus	1990	Division 4
Columbus	1996	Division 4
Lodi	2017	Division 4
Columbus	2022	Division 4
Lodi	2023	Division 4

Boys Soccer
School	Year	Division
Columbus	2008	Division 3
Sugar River Raiders	2023	Division 3

Girls Volleyball
School	Year	Division
Waunakee	1985	Class B
Waunakee	1986	Class B
Wisconsin Heights	2008	Division 3
Waterloo	2014	Division 3
Waterloo	2015	Division 3
Lakeside Lutheran	2017	Division 2

=== Winter sports ===
Boys Basketball
School	Year	Division
McFarland	1973	Class B
McFarland	1974	Class C
Marshall	2002	Division 3
New Glarus	2019	Division 4

Girls Basketball
School	Year	Division
McFarland	1983	Class B
McFarland	1999	Division 2
Lakeside Lutheran	2001	Division 3
Columbus	2002	Division 2
Columbus	2003	Division 2
Marshall	2018	Division 3
Marshall	2019	Division 3
Lake Mills	2021	Division 2

Gymnastics
School	Year	Division
Lake Mills	1979	Class B
Lake Mills	1980	Class B
Mount Horeb	1984	Class B
Mount Horeb	1993	Division 2

Boys Swimming & Diving
School	Year	Division
Verona	1993	Division 2

Boys Wrestling
School	Year	Division
Lodi	1998	Division 2
Lodi	2008	Division 2

=== Spring sports ===
Baseball
School	Year	Division
Wisconsin Heights	1989	Class C
Lodi	2013	Division 2
Wisconsin Heights	2014	Division 3

Boys Golf
School	Year	Division
Mount Horeb	1988	Class B
Lodi	1990	Class B
Lodi	1996	Division 2
Lake Mills	1997	Division 3
Lodi	1998	Division 2
Lodi	2015	Division 2
Cambridge	2023	Division 3

Softball
School	Year	Division
Waunakee	1987	Class B
Poynette	1998	Division 2
Poynette	2011	Division 3
Poynette	2018	Division 3
Poynette	2019	Division 3
Poynette	2022	Division 2

Boys Track & Field
School	Year	Division
McFarland	1977	Class C
Verona	1992	Division 2
Sugar River Raiders	2012	Division 2
Cambridge	2018	Division 3
Lodi	2021	Division 2
Lakeside Lutheran	2023	Division 2
Lakeside Lutheran	2024	Division 2

Girls Track & Field
School	Year	Division
Lake Mills	1974	Class B
Lake Mills	1980	Class B
Verona	1984	Class B
Verona	1985	Class B
Lake Mills	1986	Class B
Verona	1991	Division 2
Mount Horeb/ Barneveld	1996	Division 2
McFarland	2001	Division 2
Columbus	2004	Division 2
Lakeside Lutheran	2005	Division 2
Lakeside Lutheran	2006	Division 2

== List of conference champions ==
=== Boys Basketball ===
School	Quantity	Years
Marshall	13	2002, 2005, 2006, 2007, 2008, 2009, 2012, 2013, 2014, 2015, 2016, 2021, 2025
Columbus	12	1978, 1983, 1984, 1986, 1988, 1990, 1991, 1992, 1993, 2003, 2022, 2023
McFarland	11	1973, 1974, 1977, 1978, 1979, 1994, 1995, 1996, 1997, 1998, 1999
Lakeside Lutheran	10	2004, 2006, 2007, 2008, 2009, 2010, 2011, 2019, 2021, 2023
Lake Mills	8	1980, 2016, 2017, 2020, 2023, 2024, 2025, 2026
New Glarus	6	2017, 2018, 2019, 2020, 2024, 2025
Lodi	5	2012, 2013, 2014, 2018, 2022
Wisconsin Heights	5	1975, 1981, 1982, 2000, 2010
Waterloo	4	1971, 1972, 1973, 1976
Waunakee	4	1977, 1984, 1986, 1987
Belleville	3	2022, 2023, 2024
Cambridge	3	2011, 2025, 2026
Poynette	3	1970, 2014, 2015
DeForest	2	1983, 1985
Luther Prep	2	2007, 2010
Mount Horeb	2	1995, 2001
Verona	2	1989, 1991
Waupun	0	

=== Girls Basketball ===
School	Quantity	Years
Columbus	17	1990, 1991, 1992, 1995, 2000, 2001, 2002, 2003, 2004, 2005, 2006, 2007, 2008, 2009, 2010, 2011, 2012
McFarland	10	1978, 1979, 1980, 1981, 1982, 1983, 1996, 1997, 1998, 1999
Lakeside Lutheran	8	2006, 2012, 2014, 2015, 2016, 2017, 2018, 2026
Marshall	8	2013, 2014, 2015, 2016, 2018, 2019, 2020, 2021
Lake Mills	6	2019, 2020, 2021, 2022, 2023, 2024
New Glarus	6	2007, 2008, 2022, 2023, 2024, 2026
Belleville	5	2008, 2010, 2011, 2022, 2025
Wisconsin Heights	5	1975, 1976, 1977, 1988, 2017
Cambridge	4	2008, 2009, 2012, 2022
Mount Horeb	4	1989, 1993, 1994, 1997
Lodi	3	1984, 2013, 2019
Waunakee	3	1985, 1986, 1987
Poynette	2	2017, 2025
Verona	2	1991, 1993
DeForest	0	
Luther Prep	0	
Waterloo	0	
Waupun	0	

=== Football ===
School	Quantity	Years
Columbus	15	1977, 1990, 1991, 1992, 1993, 1994, 1995, 1996, 2001, 2003, 2016, 2021, 2022, 2024, 2025
Marshall	10	2001, 2002, 2006, 2007, 2008, 2009, 2010, 2011, 2012, 2015
Waunakee	10	1969, 1970, 1972, 1973, 1974, 1975, 1977, 1978, 1979, 1985
Lodi	9	1971, 2006, 2008, 2009, 2013, 2014, 2015, 2017, 2023
DeForest	7	1979, 1980, 1981, 1982, 1983, 1984, 1986
Lakeside Lutheran	7	2001, 2005, 2007, 2010, 2011, 2012, 2018
Cambridge	6	2004, 2008, 2014, 2017, 2018, 2019
Lake Mills	5	1987, 1988, 2019, 2021, 2026
McFarland	5	1973, 1976, 1995, 1997, 2000
New Glarus/ Monticello	4	2009, 2013, 2016, 2017
Poynette	3	1989, 1999, 2010
Waterloo	3	2001, 2009, 2015
Verona	2	1970, 1971
Belleville	1	2017
Mount Horeb	1	1984
Wisconsin Heights	1	1998
Belleville/ Albany	0	
Big Foot	0	
Clinton	0	
Edgerton	0	
Edgewood	0	
Horicon/ Hustisford	0	
Jefferson	0	
Luther Prep	0	
Portage	0	
Turner	0	
