= Dual County Conference =

Wisconsin high school athletic conference (1926-2001)

The Dual County Conference is a former high school athletic conference in Wisconsin, inaugurated in 1926 as the Columbia County Little Six Conference and ending competition in 2001. All conference members were affiliated with the Wisconsin Interscholastic Athletic Association.

== History ==
=== 1926–1939 ===
Location of Original Columbia County Little Six Conference Members

The Dual County Conference opened competition in 1926 as the Columbia County Forensic League. It was started as a league for academic competition before branching out into athletics in 1928. Its membership consisted of six small high schools in south central Wisconsin: five in Columbia County (Cambria, Fall River, Pardeeville, Poynette and Rio) and one just across the county line in Dodge County (Randolph). The conference expanded to seven schools in 1934, adding Fox Lake High School to its membership roster. The name of the conference became the Columbia County Little Seven Conference, despite the fact that the conference now had two schools in Dodge County.

=== 1939–1954 ===
In 1939, the conference added Reeseville High School and changed its name to the Dual County Conference, as the conference now had three member schools in Dodge County instead of one. Reeseville left the conference in 1942 when they suspended their athletic program during World War II and were replaced by Markesan High School three years later. This marked the Dual County Conference's first foray into Green Lake County, but the name remained unchanged. The Dual County Conference sponsored six-man football for the first time in the 1946 season with four members participating (Fall River, Pardeeville, Randolph and Rio). Cambria (formerly of the Suburban Six-Man Football League) and Fox Lake joined the conference for the 1947 season, and all conference members were participating by 1948. In 1952, the Dual County Conference made a transition to sponsoring eight-man football with all member schools participating.

=== 1954–1970 ===
Poynette, which had historically been the largest school in the conference, joined the Tri-County League in 1954 and were immediately replaced by Princeton (previously of the Little 7-C Conference). Two years later, the Dual County Conference gave its member schools the option of sponsoring eleven-man football, which the larger schools adopted in 1956 before the entire conference transitioned in 1959. Fox Lake made its exit that same year to join the Fox Valley Tri-County League for its final three years before consolidating with Waupun in 1962. Montello, formerly a member of the Big 7-C Conference, joined the Dual County Conference in 1961. In 1970, Green Lake and Westfield joined the Dual County Conference from the Fox Valley Tri-County League and Vacationland Conference, respectively.

=== 1970–2001 ===
Location of Final Dual County Conference Members

During the final three decades of the Dual County Conference, there were relatively few changes to membership. Markesan left in 1977 to join the Flyway Conference, and were replaced by Poynette, who were previously part of the Capitol Conference and making their return to the Dual County after a nearly quarter century absence. They rejoined the Capitol Conference in 1987, and membership in the Dual County Conference stayed consistent through the rest of the conference's history with the exception of football. Fall River and Rio, citing competitive imbalance and lack of players, joined forces for the 1990 season to create a cooperative football program. The next year, the conference's three schools with the highest enrollment (Montello, Pardeeville and Westfield) swapped places for football with the three lowest-enrollment schools in the Eastern Suburban Conference (Deerfield, Hustisford and Johnson Creek). The end of the Dual County Conference came in 2001, when they merged with another conference of small schools in south central Wisconsin (the Eastern Suburban Conference) to form the new Trailways Conference.

== Conference membership history ==
=== Final members ===
| School | Location | Affiliation | Mascot | Colors | Joined | Left | Conference Joined | Current Conference |
|---|---|---|---|---|---|---|---|---|
| Cambria-Friesland | Cambria, WI | Public | Hilltoppers | | 1926 | 2001 | Trailways | |
| Fall River | Fall River, WI | Public | Pirates | | 1926 | 2001 | Trailways | |
| Green Lake | Green Lake, WI | Public | Lakers | | 1970 | 2001 | Trailways | |
| Montello | Montello, WI | Public | Hilltoppers | | 1961 | 2001 | Trailways | |
| Pardeeville | Pardeeville, WI | Public | Bulldogs | | 1926 | 2001 | Trailways | |
| Princeton | Princeton, WI | Public | Tigers | | 1954 | 2001 | Trailways | |
| Randolph | Randolph, WI | Public | Rockets | | 1926 | 2001 | Trailways | |
| Rio | Rio, WI | Public | Vikings | | 1926 | 2001 | Trailways | |
| Westfield | Westfield, WI | Public | Pioneers | | 1970 | 2001 | South Central | |

=== Previous members ===
| School | Location | Affiliation | Mascot | Colors | Joined | Left | Conference Joined | Current Conference |
|---|---|---|---|---|---|---|---|---|
| Fox Lake | Fox Lake, WI | Public | Lakers | | 1934 | 1959 | Fox Valley Tri-County | Closed in 1962 |
| Markesan | Markesan, WI | Public | Hornets | | 1945 | 1977 | Flyway | Trailways |
| Poynette | Poynette, WI | Public | Indians | | 1926, 1977 | 1954, 1987 | Tri-County | Capitol |
| Reeseville | Reeseville, WI | Public | Eagles | | 1939 | 1942 | Independent | Closed in 1969 |

=== Football-only members ===
| School | Location | Affiliation | Mascot | Colors | Seasons | Primary Conference |
|---|---|---|---|---|---|---|
| Rio/ Fall River | Rio, WI | Public | Rebels | | 1990-2000 | Dual County |
| Deerfield | Deerfield, WI | Public | Demons | | 1991-2000 | Eastern Suburban |
| Hustisford | Hustisford, WI | Public | Falcons | | 1991-2000 | Eastern Suburban |
| Johnson Creek | Johnson Creek, WI | Public | Bluejays | | 1991-2000 | Eastern Suburban |

== Membership timeline ==
Football-only members Non-football members

== List of state champions ==
=== Fall sports ===
None

=== Winter sports ===
Boys Basketball
| School | Year | Division |
|---|---|---|
| Pardeeville | 1936 | Class C |
| Randolph | 1996 | Division 4 |
| Randolph | 1998 | Division 4 |

Curling
| School | Year | Division |
|---|---|---|
| Pardeeville | 1964 | Single Division |

Gymnastics
| School | Year | Division |
|---|---|---|
| Fall River | 1981 | Class B |
| Fall River | 1982 | Class B |

=== Spring sports ===
Girls Track & Field
| School | Year | Division |
|---|---|---|
| Pardeeville | 1980 | Class C |
| Poynette | 1984 | Class C |

== List of conference champions ==
=== Boys Basketball ===
| School | Quantity | Years |
|---|---|---|
| Randolph | 29 | 1933, 1939, 1940, 1951, 1953, 1954, 1955, 1956, 1957, 1958, 1959, 1960, 1962, 1968, 1969, 1974, 1981, 1986, 1987, 1988, 1989, 1990, 1992, 1993, 1994, 1995, 1996, 1997, 1998 |
| Pardeeville | 14 | 1934, 1935, 1936, 1937, 1945, 1964, 1970, 1971, 1975, 1978, 1979, 1980, 1990, 1991 |
| Rio | 14 | 1942, 1943, 1944, 1947, 1949, 1950, 1952, 1956, 1961, 1963, 1965, 1967, 1976, 1977 |
| Poynette | 7 | 1929, 1930, 1931, 1932, 1938, 1948, 1982 |
| Cambria-Friesland | 4 | 1941, 1972, 1973, 1984 |
| Fall River | 3 | 1967, 1999, 2000 |
| Markesan | 3 | 1946, 1966, 1974 |
| Westfield | 3 | 1982, 1983, 1986 |
| Green Lake | 1 | 2001 |
| Montello | 1 | 1985 |
| Fox Lake | 0 | |
| Princeton | 0 | |
| Reeseville | 0 | |

=== Girls Basketball ===
| School | Quantity | Years |
|---|---|---|
| Randolph | 20 | 1975, 1980, 1983, 1985, 1986, 1987, 1988, 1989, 1990, 1991, 1992, 1993, 1994, 1995, 1996, 1997, 1998, 1999, 2000, 2001 |
| Cambria-Friesland | 3 | 1975, 1978, 1988 |
| Pardeeville | 3 | 1976, 1981, 1996 |
| Poynette | 3 | 1981, 1982, 1984 |
| Markesan | 2 | 1976, 1977 |
| Montello | 1 | 1979 |
| Rio | 1 | 1986 |
| Fall River | 0 | |
| Green Lake | 0 | |
| Princeton | 0 | |
| Rio/ Fall River | 0 | |
| Westfield | 0 | |

=== Football ===
| School | Quantity | Years |
|---|---|---|
| Randolph | 17 | 1950, 1951, 1952, 1954, 1955, 1956, 1958, 1959, 1961, 1965, 1978, 1979, 1983, 1984, 1987, 1988, 2000 |
| Pardeeville | 11 | 1946, 1947, 1960, 1961, 1962, 1963, 1967, 1969, 1970, 1975, 1990 |
| Cambria-Friesland | 8 | 1948, 1972, 1992, 1994, 1995, 1996, 1997, 1998 |
| Poynette | 7 | 1977, 1980, 1981, 1982, 1983, 1985, 1986 |
| Montello | 5 | 1968, 1969, 1971, 1973, 1975 |
| Hustisford | 4 | 1991, 1992, 1993, 1999 |
| Westfield | 4 | 1973, 1975, 1976, 1989 |
| Fall River | 3 | 1952, 1966, 1975 |
| Markesan | 3 | 1949, 1957, 1964 |
| Princeton | 2 | 1973, 1974 |
| Rio | 2 | 1953, 1969 |
| Deerfield | 0 | |
| Fox Lake | 0 | |
| Green Lake | 0 | |
| Johnson Creek | 0 | |
| Reeseville | 0 | |
| Rio/ Fall River | 0 | |
