= Madison Suburban Conference =

Wisconsin high school athletic conference (1926–1969)

The Madison Suburban Conference is a former high school athletic conference in Wisconsin, founded in 1926 and ending competition in 1969. Its members were located in south central Wisconsin, predominantly around the Madison area.

== History ==
=== 1926–1952 ===
Location of Original Madison Suburban Conference Members

The Madison Suburban Conference formed in 1926 by ten schools in and around Dane County that were smaller in enrollment than those in the city of Madison: Cambridge, Deerfield, DeForest, Lodi, Marshall, Middleton, Oregon, Sun Prairie, Verona and Waterloo. It was subdivided into Eastern and Western sections after the first season of competition:

| Eastern Section | Western Section |
|---|---|
| Cambridge | DeForest |
| Deerfield | Lodi |
| Marshall | Middleton |
| Sun Prairie | Oregon |
| Waterloo | Verona |

In 1930, the Madison Suburban Conference began sponsorship of football with Cambridge, Lodi, Middleton and Sun Prairie as their original membership roster. Divisions were eliminated in basketball for the 1931–32 season, and Lodi left the conference for the Tri-County League at that season's conclusion. Johnson Creek joined the conference in 1935 after moving over from the Little Five Conference, having won all six basketball titles during that conference's history. The Madison Suburban Conference accepted its first football-only member in 1941 when Blanchardville, whose primary affiliation was with the State Line League, joined the conference. They remained a member until after the 1949 season, when they switched to eight-man football and joined the State Line League.

=== 1952–1963 ===
Location of Madison Suburban Conference Members (1955-1963):

Growth in the Madison area during the post-war years accompanied some substantial shifts with the athletic conferences in south central Wisconsin. Middleton exited the Madison Suburban Conference in 1952 to join the new Badger Conference, and Juneau joined the following year after the break-up of the 4-C Conference. Verona left in 1954 to join the Tri-County League, and in 1955 the conference would add three schools that left the Badger Conference: Evansville, Lake Mills and Milton.

=== 1963–1969 ===
In 1963, the high school athletic conferences in the Madison area went through another period of significant realignment. Sun Prairie left the conference to join the Badger Conference that year, and their place was immediately taken by the new high school in McFarland. The conference also absorbed the former Tri-County League, which had been reduced from ten to six schools due to a series of consolidations and the defection of Sauk Prairie High School to the South Central Conference. Former members Lodi and Verona rejoined the conference, and they were accompanied by Poynette, River Valley in Spring Green, Waunakee and Wisconsin Heights in Mazomanie. In order to accommodate the new schools, the Madison Suburban Conference was subdivided into three sections of six schools each:

| Central Section | Eastern Section | Western Section |
|---|---|---|
| DeForest | Cambridge | Lodi |
| Evansville | Deerfield | Poynette |
| Lake Mills | Johnson Creek | River Valley |
| Milton | Juneau | Verona |
| Oregon | Marshall | Waunakee |
| Waterloo | McFarland | Wisconsin Heights |

The Madison Suburban Conference's absorption of both the Tri-County League and the football-only Southern Dairyland Conference (of which Deerfield, Johnson Creek and Marshall were members) meant all members of the Madison Suburban Conference participated in football for the first time in its history. River Valley would leave after only one season in the conference to join the Southwest Wisconsin Activities League, and their place was taken by Lakeside Lutheran High School in Lake Mills. They joined the Eastern Section with McFarland moving over to the Western Section:

Location of Final Madison Suburban Conference Members:

| Central Section | Eastern Section | Western Section |
|---|---|---|
| DeForest | Cambridge | Lodi |
| Evansville | Deerfield | McFarland |
| Lake Mills | Johnson Creek | Poynette |
| Milton | Juneau | Verona |
| Oregon | Lakeside Lutheran | Waunakee |
| Waterloo | Marshall | Wisconsin Heights |

In the long term, this level of growth proved to be unsustainable and in 1969, the Madison Suburban Conference split up into three separate conferences, predominantly along the final sectional alignment. All six schools in the Western Section (along with DeForest and Waterloo from the Central Section) formed the Capitol Conference, the six schools in the Eastern Section (along with Palmyra and Queen of Apostles in Madison) formed the Eastern Suburban Conference, and the four remaining schools in the Central Section (along with Beloit Turner and Clinton) formed the Central Suburban Conference.

== Conference membership history ==
=== Final members ===
| School | Location | Affiliation | Mascot | Colors | Joined | Left | Conference Joined | Current Conference |
|---|---|---|---|---|---|---|---|---|
| Cambridge | Cambridge, WI | Public | Bluejays | | 1926 | 1969 | Eastern Suburban | Capitol |
| Deerfield | Deerfield, WI | Public | Demons | | 1926 | 1969 | Eastern Suburban | Trailways |
| DeForest | DeForest, WI | Public | Norskies | | 1926 | 1969 | Capitol | Badger |
| Evansville | Evansville, WI | Public | Blue Devils | | 1955 | 1969 | Central Suburban | Rock Valley |
| Johnson Creek | Johnson Creek, WI | Public | Bluejays | | 1935 | 1969 | Eastern Suburban | Trailways |
| Juneau | Juneau, WI | Public | Chiefs | | 1953 | 1969 | Eastern Suburban (Note: Athletics program merged with Lowell-Reeseville in 1969, schools merged in 1970 to form Dodgeland High School) | Trailways |
| Lake Mills | Lake Mills, WI | Public | L-Cats | | 1955 | 1969 | Central Suburban | Capitol |
| Lakeside Lutheran | Lake Mills, WI | Private (WELS) | Warriors | | 1964 | 1969 | Eastern Suburban | Capitol |
| Lodi | Lodi, WI | Public | Blue Devils | | 1926, 1963 | 1932, 1969 | Tri-County, Capitol | Capitol |
| Marshall | Marshall, WI | Public | Cardinals | | 1926 | 1969 | Eastern Suburban | Capitol |
| McFarland | McFarland, WI | Public | Spartans | | 1963 | 1969 | Capitol | Badger |
| Milton | Milton, WI | Public | RedHawks (Note: Nickname was Redmen prior to 1999) | | 1955 | 1969 | Central Suburban | Badger |
| Oregon | Oregon, WI | Public | Panthers | | 1926 | 1969 | Central Suburban | Badger |
| Poynette | Poynette, WI | Public | Indians | | 1963 | 1969 | Capitol | Capitol |
| Verona | Verona, WI | Public | Wildcats (Note: Nickname was Indians prior to 1992) | | 1926, 1963 | 1954, 1969 | Tri-County, Capitol | Big Eight |
| Waterloo | Waterloo, WI | Public | Pirates | | 1926 | 1969 | Capitol | Capitol |
| Waunakee | Waunakee, WI | Public | Warriors | | 1963 | 1969 | Capitol | Badger |
| Wisconsin Heights | Mazomanie, WI | Public | Vanguards | | 1963 | 1969 | Capitol | Capitol |

=== Previous members ===
| School | Location | Affiliation | Mascot | Colors | Joined | Left | Conference Joined | Current Conference |
|---|---|---|---|---|---|---|---|---|
| Middleton | Middleton, WI | Public | Cardinals | | 1926 | 1952 | Badger | Big Eight |
| River Valley | Spring Green, WI | Public | Blackhawks | | 1963 | 1964 | SWAL | Southwest Wisconsin |
| Sun Prairie (Note: Known as Sun Prairie High School prior to 2022) | Sun Prairie, WI | Public | Cardinals | | 1926 | 1963 | Badger | Big Eight |

=== Football-only members ===
| School | Location | Affiliation | Mascot | Colors | Seasons | Primary Conference |
|---|---|---|---|---|---|---|
| Blanchardville | Blanchardville, WI | Public | Golden Eagles | | 1941-1949 | State Line |

== Membership timeline ==
Full members

Eastern Section Western Section Central Section

=== Football members ===
Central Section Eastern Section Western Section

== List of state champions ==
=== Fall sports ===
None

=== Winter sports ===
Curling
| School | Year | Division |
|---|---|---|
| Poynette | 1966 | Single Division |

=== Spring sports ===
None

== List of conference champions ==
=== Boys Basketball ===
| School | Quantity | Years |
|---|---|---|
| Marshall | 10 | 1928, 1929, 1937, 1944, 1948, 1950, 1953, 1958, 1968, 1969 |
| Sun Prairie | 10 | 1930, 1931, 1932, 1951, 1952, 1955, 1957, 1958, 1959, 1960 |
| Oregon | 7 | 1934, 1939, 1945, 1956, 1960, 1961, 1962 |
| Waterloo | 7 | 1933, 1935, 1938, 1944, 1956, 1963, 1964 |
| Johnson Creek | 6 | 1939, 1940, 1941, 1942, 1944, 1964 |
| Middleton | 5 | 1927, 1928, 1935, 1936, 1937 |
| Juneau | 4 | 1954, 1956, 1965, 1966 |
| Lodi | 4 | 1928, 1929, 1964, 1966 |
| DeForest | 3 | 1930, 1931, 1968 |
| Lake Mills | 3 | 1965, 1967, 1968 |
| McFarland | 3 | 1967, 1968, 1969 |
| Verona | 3 | 1947, 1949, 1954 |
| Cambridge | 2 | 1946, 1960 |
| Deerfield | 2 | 1966, 1967 |
| Milton | 2 | 1956, 1966 |
| Evansville | 1 | 1969 |
| Poynette | 1 | 1965 |
| Waunakee | 1 | 1969 |
| Lakeside Lutheran | 0 | |
| River Valley | 0 | |
| Wisconsin Heights | 0 | |

=== Football ===
| School | Quantity | Years |
|---|---|---|
| Sun Prairie | 15 | 1930, 1931, 1941, 1942, 1947, 1948, 1949, 1950, 1951, 1953, 1955, 1958, 1959, 1960, 1962 |
| Middleton | 7 | 1930, 1932, 1934, 1935, 1936, 1945, 1946 |
| Cambridge | 6 | 1933, 1934, 1937, 1938, 1939, 1947 |
| Milton | 5 | 1957, 1959, 1965, 1966, 1968 |
| Johnson Creek | 3 | 1952, 1954, 1963 |
| Oregon | 3 | 1944, 1961, 1964 |
| Poynette | 3 | 1965, 1966, 1968 |
| Deerfield | 2 | 1965, 1968 |
| DeForest | 2 | 1956, 1957 |
| Juneau | 2 | 1964, 1967 |
| Lake Mills | 2 | 1963, 1967 |
| Lodi | 2 | 1963, 1966 |
| McFarland | 2 | 1964, 1968 |
| Waunakee | 2 | 1965, 1967 |
| Blanchardville | 1 | 1942 |
| Marshall | 1 | 1966 |
| Waterloo | 1 | 1940 |
| Evansville | 0 | |
| Lakeside Lutheran | 0 | |
| River Valley | 0 | |
| Verona | 0 | |
| Wisconsin Heights | 0 | |
