= McFarland School District =

School district in Wisconsin, United States

Coordinates: 43.011111°N 89.295278°W

Address
- 5101 Farwell St McFarland, Wisconsin, 53558; United States

District information
- Grades: PK–12
- Schools: 9
- NCES District ID: 5508910

Students and staff
- Students: 5,639 (2023–24)
- Teachers: 342.81 (on an FTE basis)
- Student–teacher ratio: 16.45

Other information
- Website: www.mcfarland.k12.wi.us

McFarland School District (MSD) is a public school district headquartered in McFarland, Wisconsin. It serves the Village of McFarland, City of Madison, the towns of Dunn, Cottage Grove, and Pleasant Springs. The district has nine schools.

== Schools ==
Schools
School	Grades
McFarland High School	9-12
Indian Mound Middle School	6-8
Waubesa Intermediate School	3-5
McFarland Primary School	Pre K-2
4k McFarland	Pre K
Destinations Career Academy	9–12
Insight School	9–12
Wisconsin Virtual Academy High	9–12
Wisconsin Virtual Academy K–8	Pre K–8
