= Waunakee Community School District =

School district in Wisconsin, United States

Address
- 905 Bethel Circle Waunakee, Dane County, Wisconsin, 53597; United States
- Coordinates: 43.180°N 89.435°W

District information
- Type: Public
- Grades: Pre-K/K–12
- School board: Seven members
- Schools: Elementary (4); Middle (1); High (1)
- NCES District ID: 5515810

Students and staff
- Students: 4,410 (2023-2024)
- Staff: 653.99 (FTE, 2023-2024)
- Student–teacher ratio: 12.57

Other information
- Website: www.waunakee.k12.wi.us

The Waunakee Community School District is a school district based in the village of Waunakee, Wisconsin. It serves the village of Waunakee, and the surrounding area. Waunakee Community has a seven-member Board of Education that governs the district and selects the superintendent.

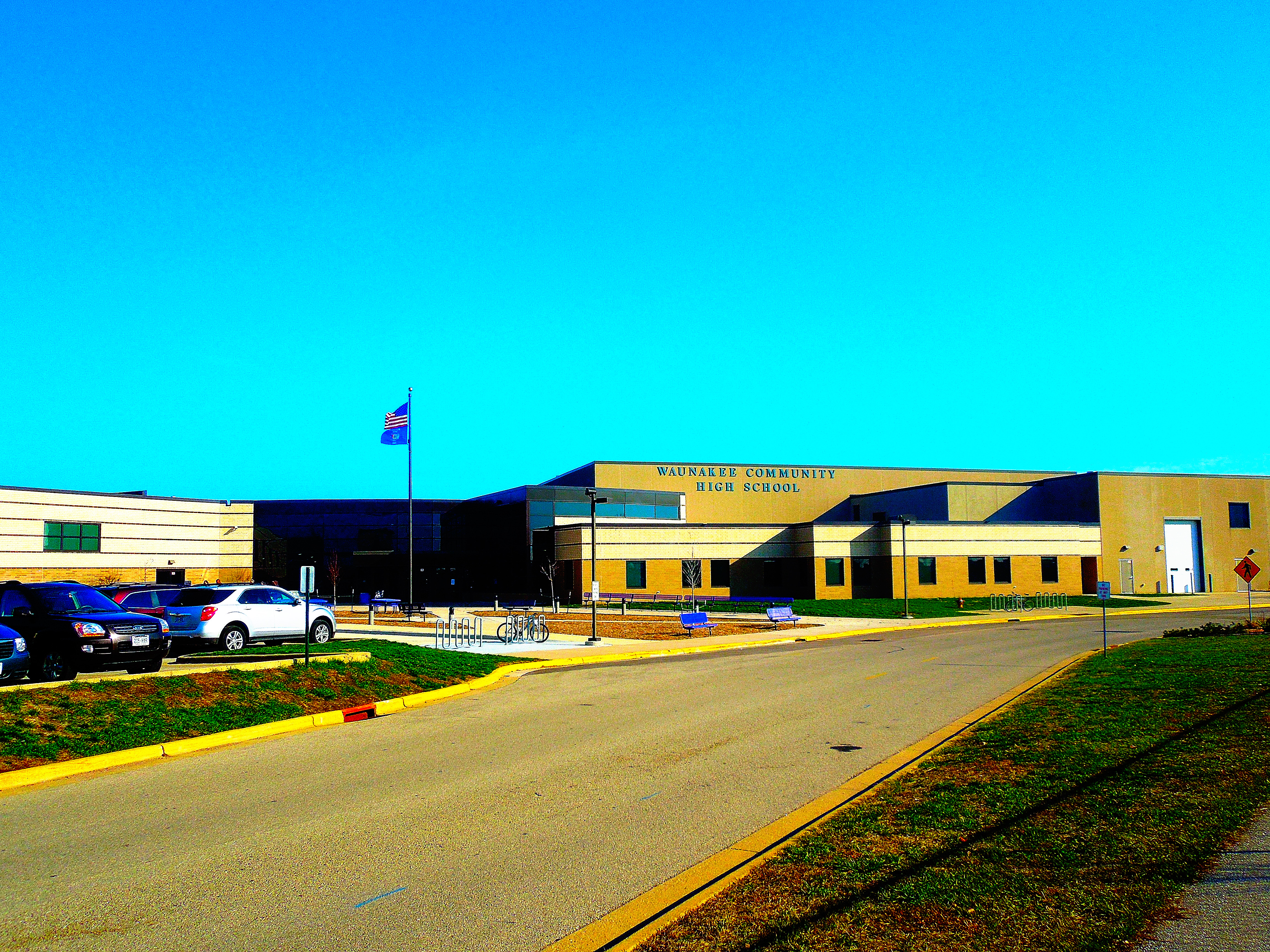
Waunakee Community High School

The district administers four elementary schools, one middle school, and one high school, for a total of six schools.

== Schools ==
| School | Year built | Description |
|---|---|---|
| Waunakee Community High School | 1971 | Serves grades 9-12. |
| Waunakee Community Middle School | 2026 | Serves grades 7-8. |
| Waunakee Intermediate School | 2016 | Serves grades 5-6. |
| Prairie Elementary School | 1996 | Serves grades 4K-4. |
| Heritage Elementary School | 2024 | Serves grades 4K-4. |
| Arboretum Elementary School | 2006 | Serves grades 4K-4. |
