= Randolph High School (Wisconsin) =

Location
- 110 Meadowood Drive; Randolph, Wisconsin 53956; United States
- Coordinates: 43°32′33″N 88°59′55″W

Information
- Type: Public secondary school
- School district: Randolph School District
- Principal: Andy Kohn
- Teaching staff: 15.15 (on an FTE basis)
- Grades: 9-12
- Enrollment: 201 (2022-2023)
- Student to teacher ratio: 13.27
- Colors: Royal blue and white
- Athletics conference: Trailways Conference
- Nickname: Rockets
- Website: rsdwihs.rsdwi.org

Randolph High School is a public high school in Randolph, Wisconsin, United States.

== Athletics ==
The Randolph Rockets compete in the Trailways Conference. School colors are royal blue and white. The following Wisconsin Interscholastic Athletic Association (WIAA) sanctioned sports are offered:

- Baseball (boys)
- Basketball (girls and boys)
  - Boys state champion - 1996, 1998, 2002, 2003, 3004, 2005, 2007, 2010, 2011, 2013, 2022
- Cross country (girls and boys)
- Football (boys)
- Golf (boys)
- Softball (girls)
- Track and field (girls and boys)
- Volleyball (girls)

=== Athletic conference affiliation history ===
- Columbia County Little Six (1926-1934)
- Columbia County Little Seven (1934-1939)
- Dual County Conference (1939-2001)
- Trailways Conference (2001–present)

== Notable alumni ==
- Greg Stiemsma, National Basketball Association (NBA) basketball player
