= Waunakee Community High School =

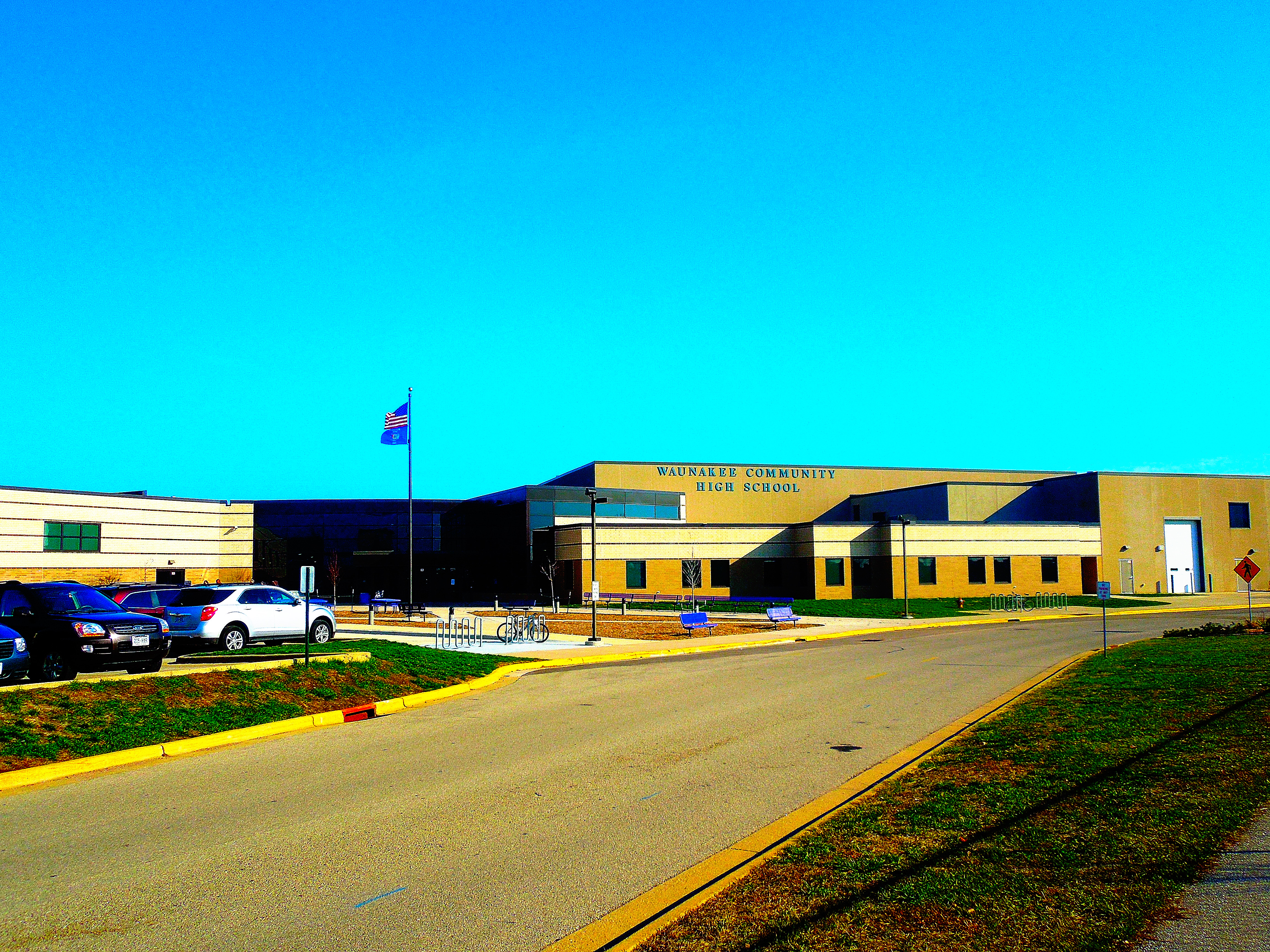

Location
- 301 Community Drive; Waunakee, Wisconsin; United States; 43.18327°N 89.45704°W

Information
- Type: Public Secondary
- Motto: Committed to Children, Committed to Community, Committed to Excellence
- Established: 1904
- Status: Open
- School board: Waunakee School Board of Education
- School district: Waunakee Community School District
- Superintendent: Monica Kelsey-Brown
- Principal: Deanne Lensert
- Assistant Principals: Chad Gauerke, Steve Hernandez, Jason Marshall
- Faculty: 103.36
- Teaching staff: 103.36 (FTE)
- Grades: 9–12
- Enrollment: 1,335 (2024–2025)
- Student to teacher ratio: 12.92
- Language: Majority English, Also Includes, Spanish, French, and Mandarin
- Student Union/Association: Student Council
- Colors: White and Purple
- Athletics: Football, Soccer, Basketball, Volleyball, ETC
- Nickname: Warriors
- Rival: DeForest Norskies
- Newspaper: The Purple Sage
- Yearbook: Whipurwauna
- Website: https://whs.waunakee.k12.wi.us/

Waunakee Community High School is a public high school located in Waunakee, Wisconsin. It is part of the Waunakee Community School District and part of the Badger Conference in athletics. The attendance area includes the village of Waunakee, most of the town of Westport, portions of the cities of Middleton and Madison, and portions of the towns of Dane, Springfield, and Vienna.

== Campus ==
For the first thirty years or so of Waunakee's existence, Waunakee students traveled by train to attend high school in Lodi. To meet the needs of the growing community, a referendum of Waunakee and Westport voters to construct a high school for $5,000 passed in August 1904. The first high school building was opened in the fall of 1905 on the present site of Waunakee Middle School adjacent to St. John's Catholic Church. An adjacent four-classroom structure for elementary students that later became the high school "annex" was completed in 1922, followed by a larger addition just to the north in 1936. The original building was replaced in 1950 with additions in 1962 and 1964. A new high school was constructed and opened in 1971 approximately a half mile to the south, which remains the high school to this day. That section of the school includes the current old gym, library, and small auditorium. A 1993 addition added more classrooms and a greenhouse on the west side of the building, and a second gym (fieldhouse) was added on the east side of the building. A new commons area, pool, 679-seat performing arts center, fieldhouse expansion, and two wings of classrooms were added to the south side of the building in 2005, in addition to renovations in other areas and new athletic fields. There is a rock art mural displaying Wisconsin's natural and cultural history in the commons. In 2012, a second floor over a portion of the 2005 addition and a new main office area were added.

== Extracurricular activities ==
=== Athletics ===
Athletic teams include:

- Boys' and girls' cross country
- Boys' and girls' soccer
- Boys' and girls' golf
- Boys' and girls' swimming
- Boys' and girls' tennis
- Boys' and girls' track
- Boys' and girls' lacrosse
- Boys' and girls' basketball
- Boys' and girls' ski and snowboard team
- Mountain Biking
- Football
- Baseball
- Football cheerleading
- Dance team
- Gymnastics
- Baseball
- Softball
- Volleyball
- Wrestling
- Boys' and girls' hockey
- Equestrian team

Waunakee has had a long time rivalry with fellow Badger North Conference member the DeForest Norskies.

==== Football ====
The Waunakee Warriors have made the playoffs in 24 consecutive seasons, won seven state championships (1999, 2002, 2009, 2010, 2011, 2018, 2021), finished runner-up five times (2001, 2005, 2012, 2019, 2023), and won 16 conference championships (1998–2001, 2003–2012, 2015–2018). The team shared the state-record for consecutive wins with 48 straight victories from 2009 to 2012, when the record was broken by Kimberly High School in 2016.

==== Golf (girls) ====
- 2010 State champion

==== Aquatic center ====
Waunakee High School is equipped with an eight-lane, twenty-five yard pool that is home to the Waunakee Warriors boys' and girls' swim teams. The aquatic center is also open for the community and non-community members for open family swims, fitness swims, swimming lessons and more.

==== Athletic conference affiliation history ====
- Tri-County League (1928-1963)
- Madison Suburban Conference (1963-1969)
- Capitol Conference (1969-1987)
- Badger Conference (1987–present)

=== Student newspaper ===
Waunakee High School’s monthly newspaper is called the Purple Sage. The Purple Sage is printed along with Waunakee’s community newspaper, the Waunakee Tribune. The paper was reestablished in 2002 after a several year hiatus and has been published ever since.

==== Kokopelli Kafe ====
Located in Waunakee High School’s school store is Kokopelli Kafe, a coffee shop that sells beverages and treats. Kokopelli Kafe is run by Waunakee High School's students with special needs. It teaches the students transitional work skills and provides interaction between students. Kokopelli Kafe philosophy is reflected in the goal: “Kokopelli Kafe is a school based business that enables students to learn functional, transitional, vocational, and social skill in a “real life” environment.”

==== Clubs ====
Waunakee Community High School offers clubs relating to construction, arts, chemicals, agriculture, sports, culture, business, and more. Students in Pay it Forward participate in volunteer work and support local and distant communities. Clubs are set up and run by students and staff. Clubs include Science Olympiad, Gaming Club, Science Club, Model United Nations, Future Liberal Leaders, Club America (TPUSA), Aviation Club, Above the Influence (ATI) Club, Spanish Club, Drama Club, French Club, FBLA, DECA, FFA, HOSA, SkillsUSA, GSA, FCCLA, Mock Trial, Pay it Forward, National Honor Society (regular, art, and Spanish), and Fishing Club.

=== Fine arts ===
Waunakee's Fine Arts Department includes programs in band, orchestra, choir, and drama. Offerings include concert band, symphonic band, wind ensemble, Warrior band, jazz ensemble, jazz combo, chorale, concert choir, Grazioso, a capella choir, Kee Notes vocal jazz, philharmonic orchestra, chamber orchestra, symphony orchestra, folk band, consort, music theory and composition, jazz improvisation, and music history.

The WHS drama department participates in the WHSFA One Act Festival each fall. On the first weekend in May, it produces a musical in even-numbered years and a full length non-musical play in odd-numbered years.
