= Augustus O. Dole =

American politician

August Osmyn Dole (February 11, 1816 – December 7, 1876) was an American businessman and politician.

Born in Shelburne, Massachusetts on February 11, 1816, he moved to Arlington, Wisconsin in 1856 and then to Poynette, Wisconsin in 1866. He owned a mill. Dole served as justice of the peace, town clerk, and on the school board. In 1876, Dole served in the Wisconsin State Assembly as a Republican. He represented the third district of Columbia County, Wisconsin. He was elected over Chas. J. Pardee, the Democratic candidate, by a vote of 679 to 535.

He died in Poynette, Wisconsin on Dec. 7, 1876, and was still in office at the time of his death from pneumonia.
