= McFarland High School (Wisconsin) =

Location
- 5103 Farewell Street; McFarland, Wisconsin 53558; United States; 43.011111°N 89.295278°W

Information
- Type: Public secondary
- Motto: Pride is the catalyst of accomplishment
- Established: 1962
- School district: McFarland School District
- Principal: Brett Jacobson
- Teaching staff: 55.12 (FTE)
- Grades: 9 – 12
- Enrollment: 777 (2022–2023)
- Student to teacher ratio: 14.10
- Color
- Mascot: Sparty the Spartan
- Website: McFarland High School

McFarland High School is a high school located in McFarland, in Dane County, Wisconsin. It is administered by the McFarland School District. The school's colors are Columbia blue, navy blue, and white and the mascot is the Spartan.

== Academics ==
In 2016, a referendum to fund facility improvements was approved by voters. The referendum includes, a new baseball complex, auditorium, track, aquatic pool, and artificial turf for the football field. The football field, track, and baseball complex were completed in 2018. A new pool and auditorium were completed in 2019.

== Athletics ==
McFarland's nickname is the Spartans, and they rejoined the Badger Conference in 2023 (they had previously been members from 2001-2008) after a fifteen-year stint as members of the Rock Valley Conference.

Sports offered at McFarland include:
| Boys | Girls |
|---|---|
| Baseball | Basketball |
| Basketball | Cross country |
| Cross country | Golf |
| Football | Poms |
| Golf | Soccer |
| Hockey | Softball |
| Soccer | Swimming |
| Swimming | Tennis |
| Tennis | Track and field |
| Track and field | Volleyball |
| | Hockey |

In 2008-2009, the McFarland football team had a 9-0 record and won the Rock Valley Conference. The girls' tennis team and both cross country teams also won their respective Rock Valley Conference titles that season. The boys' swimming team has won seven Division II state titles, with six coming consecutively from 2007 to 2012, and another coming in 2024. The boys' swimming team was also the Division II runner-up in 2003, 2014, and 2023. The boys' golf team earned the state title once and runner-up twice for five years. The team has been in the state tournament the last nine years, and won the sectional tournament three years in a row. Girls' soccer took a second-place finish in the 2007 state games. The McFarland boys' track team won the WIAA Division 2 regionals. Boys' soccer lost in the state semi-finals in 2013, the McFarland boys' first state appearance in school history. In 2018, McFarland’s Boys Soccer team went to the Division 3 State Championship, but lost to Pius XI Catholic from Milwaukee.

State Titles Won by McFarland
| Sport | Year |
|---|---|
| Boys' basketball | 1973 |
| Boys' basketball | 1974 |
| Boys' track & field | 1977 |
| Girls' basketball | 1983 |
| Boys' cross country | 1996 |
| Girls' basketball | 1999 |
| Boys' basketball | 1999 |
| Girls' track & field | 2001 |
| Boys' cross country | 2002 |
| Boys' golf | 2004 |
| Boys' swimming | 2007 |
| Boys' swimming | 2008 |
| Boys' swimming | 2009 |
| Boys' swimming | 2010 |
| Boys' swimming | 2011 |
| Boys' swimming | 2012 |
| Boys' soccer | 2020 |
| Girls' soccer | 2021 |
| Boys' swimming | 2024 |

=== Athletic conference affiliation history ===
- Madison Suburban Conference (1963-1969)
- Capitol Conference (1969-2001)
- Badger Conference (2001-2008)
- Rock Valley Conference (2008-2023)
- Badger Conference (2023–present)

== Notable alumni ==
- Dominic Fumusa
- Becca Hamilton
- Matt Hamilton (curler)
- Laëtitia Hollard
- Nina Roth
- Steve Lacy (class of 1974), two-time Olympic middle-distance runner
- Melissa Mueller (class of 1990), U.S. Olympic pole vaulter and 2003 Pan American Games gold medalist
