= Poynette School District =

School district in Poynette, Wisconsin, United States

Address
- 108 N Cleveland St Poynette, Wisconsin, 53955; United States

District information
- Motto: "Learning Today, Leading Tomorrow"
- Grades: Pre-school - 12
- NCES District ID: 5512120

Other information
- Telephone: (608) 635-4347
- Fax: (608) 635-9200
- Website: www.poynette.k12.wi.us/index.cfm

The Poynette School District is a public school district in Columbia County, Wisconsin, United States, based in Poynette, Wisconsin.

== Schools ==
The Poynette School District has two elementary schools, one middle school and one high school.

=== Elementary schools ===
- Poynette Elementary School

=== Middle school ===
- Poynette Middle School

=== High school ===
- Poynette High School
