= Wisconsin Heights School District =

School district in Wisconsin, United States

Address
- 10173 US Highway 14 Mazomanie, Dane County, Wisconsin, 53560-9587; United States
- Coordinates: 43.156°N 89.770°W

District information
- Type: Public
- Grades: Pre-K/K–12
- School board: Seven members
- Schools: Elementary (1); Middle (1); High (1)
- NCES District ID: 5501230

Students and staff
- Students: 779 (2023-2024)
- Staff: 132.26 (FTE, 2023-2024)
- Student–teacher ratio: 12.60

Other information
- Website: www.wisheights.k12.wi.us

The Wisconsin Heights School District is a school district based in the village of Mazomanie, Wisconsin. It serves the villages of Mazomanie, Black Earth, and the surrounding rural area. Wisconsin Heights has a seven-member board of education that governs the district and selects the superintendent.

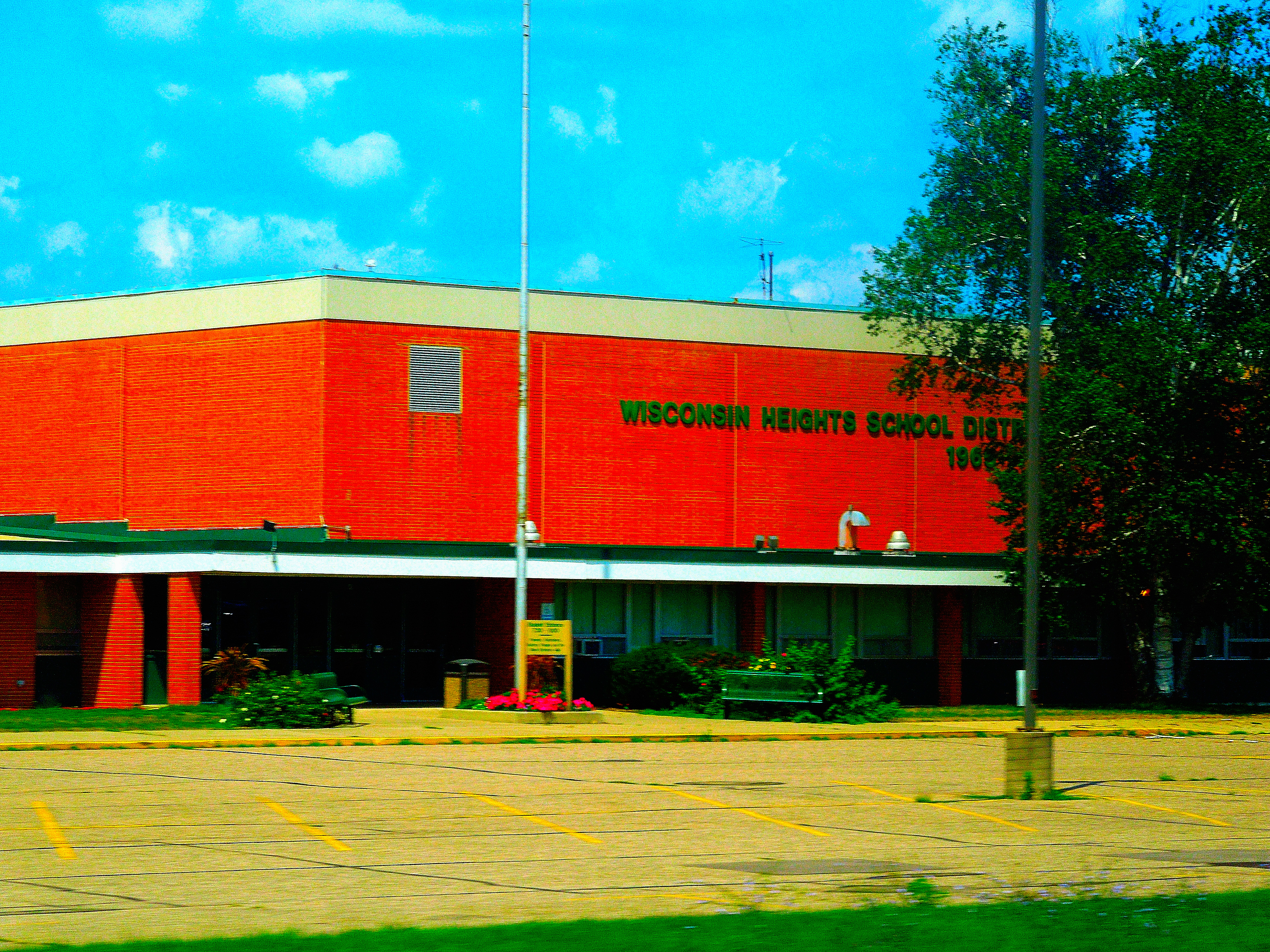
Wisconsin Heights High School

The district administers one elementary school, one middle school, and one high school, for a total of three schools. All of its schools are on the same property between Mazomanie and Black Earth on US Highway 14.

== Schools ==
School	Year built	Description
Wisconsin Heights High School	1964	Serves grades 9-12.
Wisconsin Heights Middle School	1964	Serves grades 6-8.
Wisconsin Heights Elementary School	1964	Serves grades 4K-5.
