= Lodi High School (Wisconsin) =

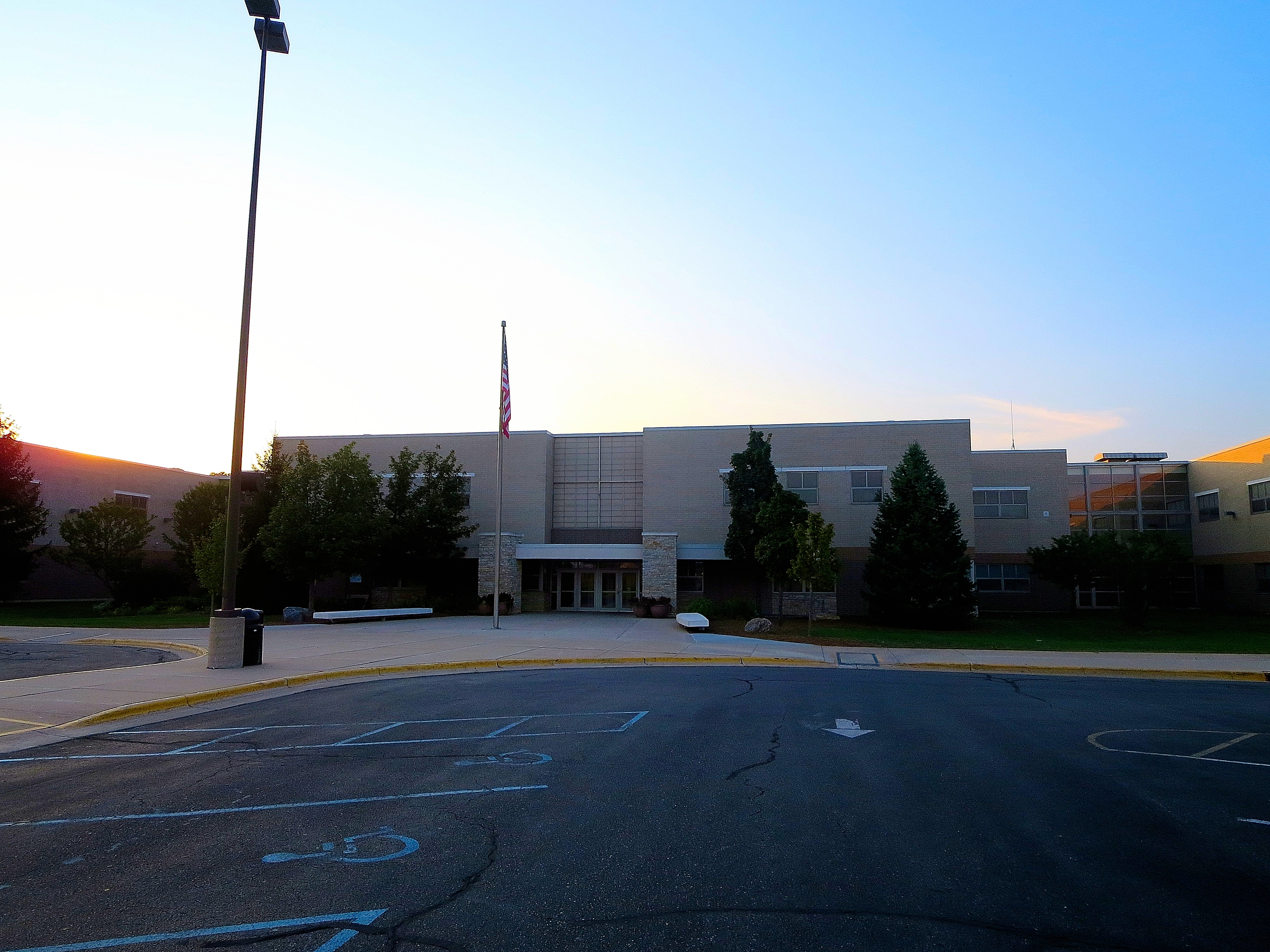

Location
- 1100 Sauk Street; Lodi, Wisconsin 53555; United States; 43.31357°N 89.54987°W

Information
- School type: Public High School
- School district: School District of Lodi
- Principal: Joe Jelinek
- Teaching staff: 36.52 (FTE)
- Grades: 9 – 12
- Enrollment: 451 (2023–2024)
- Student to teacher ratio: 12.35
- Campus size: large
- Colors: Royal blue and white
- Mascot: Blue Devils
- Rival: Sauk Prairie
- Website: Lodi High School website

Lodi High School is a high school located in Lodi, Wisconsin. It is part of the School District of Lodi.

== Extra-curricular activities ==
Sports offered include baseball, softball, cross country, track, boys' basketball, girls' basketball, boys' soccer, girls' soccer, football, wrestling, tennis, lacrosse, curling, and volleyball. Some of the non-sport extracurriculars offered are Mock trial, forensics, the winter musical, and the spring play.

=== Athletic conference affiliation history ===
- Madison Suburban Conference (1926-1932)
- Tri-County League (1932-1963)
- Madison Suburban Conference (1963-1969)
- Capitol Conference (1969-2001)
- South Central Conference (2001-2006)
- Capitol Conference (2006–present)

== State championships ==
- 2013 Baseball: 6–2 over Green Bay Notre Dame
- 2017 Football: 17–10 over St Croix Central
- 2023 Football: 38-14 over Luxembourg-Casco

== Rivalries ==
Lodi has multiple rivalries with multiple teams. The more well-known rivalries are Poynette, and Sauk Prairie. Poynette has been in the same conferences since 1982, but will be separated in 2020 for football only. Sauk Prairie and Lodi play in the "Wisconsin River Classic" and Battle for the Paddle. The paddle is blue on one side and red on the other. Sauk Prairie leads the trophy series 4–2, with Lodi winning the last contest in 2019, 61–53. Other notable rivalries are with Lakeside Lutheran and Wisconsin Dells.

== Notable alumni ==
- Tom Wopat, actor
