= Mike Wilkinson (basketball) =

American basketball player

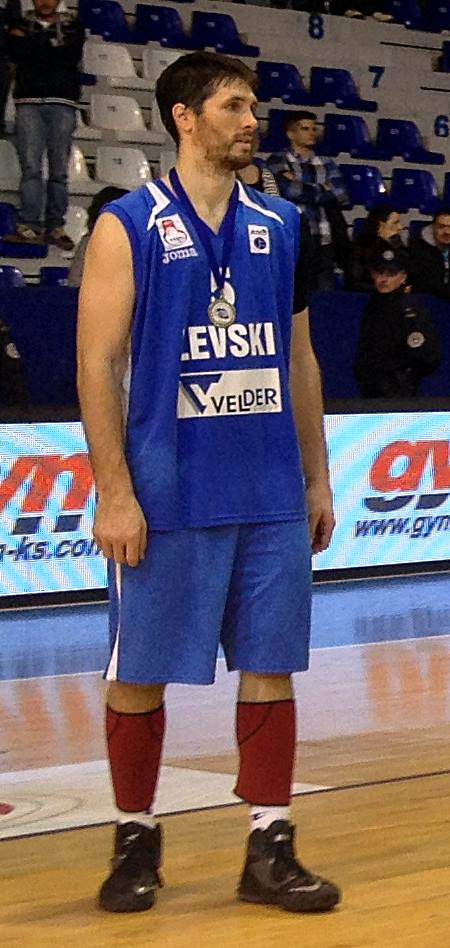

Personal information
- Born: October 1, 1981 (age 45) Blue Mounds, Wisconsin, U.S.
- Listed height: 6 ft 8.25 in (2.04 m)
- Listed weight: 245 lb (111 kg)

Career information
- High school: Wisconsin Heights (Mazomanie, Wisconsin)
- College: Wisconsin (2001–2005)
- NBA draft: 2005: undrafted
- Playing career: 2005–2014
- Position: Power forward

Career history
- 2005–2007: Aris Thessaloniki
- 2007–2009: Khimki
- 2009–2010: Galatasaray Café Crown
- 2010–2011: Lokomotiv-Kuban
- 2011–2013: UNICS Kazan
- 2014: Levski Sofia

Career highlights
- Russian Cup winner (2008); Bulgarian League champion (2014); Bulgarian Cup winner (2014); Balkan League champion (2014); Greek League All-Star (2007); Russian League All-Star (2011); Wisconsin Mr. Basketball (2000)

Michael Joseph Wilkinson (born October 1, 1981) is an American former professional basketball player. Standing at 6 ft 8.25 in (2.04 m), he played at the power forward position.

== Amateur career ==
Wilkinson attended Wisconsin Heights High School, where he played basketball for the Vanguards. In his senior year, Wilkinson earned the Mr. Basketball award, which is the player of the year award in Wisconsin high school basketball.

Wilkinson played college basketball for the Wisconsin Badgers from 2001 to 2005, redshirting his freshman year, for a total of five years with the basketball program. He averaged 14.3 points per game and was selected to the All-Big Ten Conference First Team his senior year. He was just the second player to finish his playing career with at least 1,500 points and 800 rebounds at Wisconsin.

== Professional career ==
After playing in Greece, Russia and Turkey, Wilkinson joined Euroleague team UNICS for two seasons. On January 23, 2014, he signed a contract with Levski Sofia for the rest of the season.

== National team ==
He has been granted a Macedonian citizenship and is known as Majkl Vilkinson (Мајкл Вилкинсон in Cyrillic) and he also played for the national basketball team.
