= Hugh Pierce Jamieson =

American politician

Hugh Pierce Jamieson (September 1, 1852 – October 22, 1936) was an American businessman and politician.

Born to Scottish immigrants in Poynette, Wisconsin, Jamieson went to University of Wisconsin and Northwestern Business College. He was a dealer in coal, grain, lumber, machinery, and livestock. Jamieson helped start the Central Wisconsin Trust Company and the Bank of Poynette. Jamieson served on the high school board as clerk and director and on the Poynette village board as trustee. In 1893, Jamieson served in the Wisconsin State Assembly and was a Democrat. Jamieson died in Poynette, Wisconsin.
