= Wisconsin Heights High School =

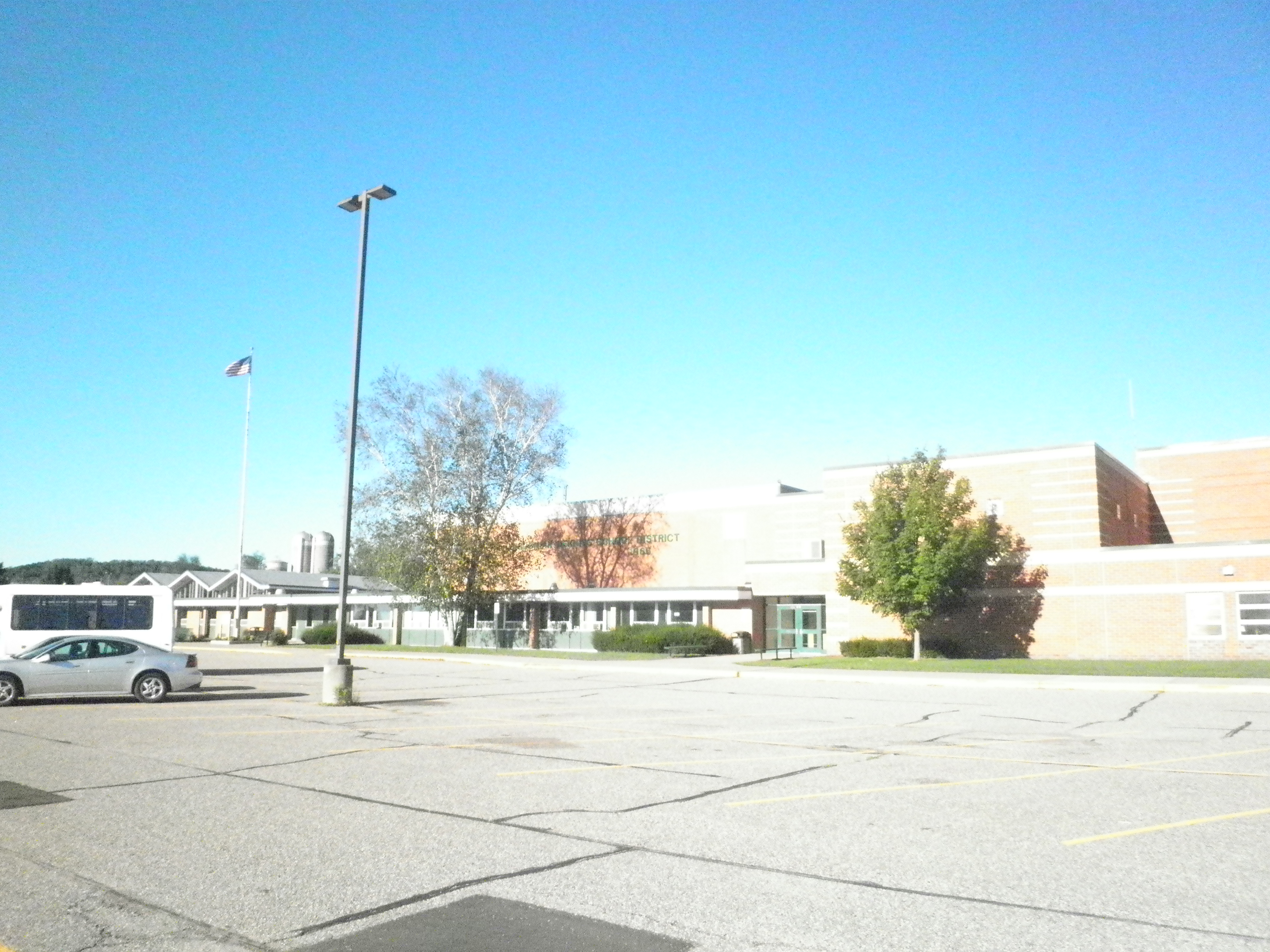

Location
- 10173 U.S. Highway 14; Mazomanie, (Dane County), Wisconsin 53560; United States

Information
- Type: Public high school
- School district: Wisconsin Heights School District
- Principal: Liz Hrodey
- Staff: 16.42 (FTE)
- Enrollment: 219 (2022-23)
- Student to teacher ratio: 13.34
- Colors: Forest green and white
- Fight song: "Go U Northwestern"
- Athletics conference: Capitol-North
- Nickname: Vanguards

Wisconsin Heights High School is a high school in Dane County, Wisconsin. It is located between Mazomanie and Black Earth, along U.S. Route 14 and is surrounded by the Wisconsin countryside.

== History ==
The school building houses both Wisconsin Heights High School and Wisconsin Heights Middle School, in separate wings, with the cafeteria and some classrooms shared. The school's slogan is "Every Child ... Every Class ... Every Day ... "

== Athletics ==
WHHS won a state championship in boys cross country in 1973.

=== Athletic conference affiliation history ===
- Madison Suburban Conference (1963-1969)
- Capitol Conference (1969–present)

== Notable alumni ==
- Holly Brook, known as "Skylar Grey", American multi-instrumentalist, singer and songwriter
- Mike Wilkinson – professional basketball player
- Marissa Bode – actress

== Notable faculty ==
- Lorenzo D. Harvey, American educator who served as Superintendent of Public Instruction of Wisconsin
