= Marshall School District (Wisconsin) =

School district in Wisconsin, United States

Address
- 617 Madison Street Marshall, Dane County, Wisconsin, 53559-9273; United States
- Coordinates: 43.163°N 89.073°W

District information
- Type: Public
- Grades: Pre-K–12
- School board: seven members
- Schools: 5
- NCES District ID: 5508790

Students and staff
- Students: 915 (2023–2024)
- Teachers: 83.33 (on an FTE basis)
- Staff: 165.11 (on an FTE basis) (2023–2024)
- Student–teacher ratio: 10.98

Other information
- Website: www.marshallschools.org

The Marshall School District is a school district based in the village of Marshall, Wisconsin. It serves the village of Marshall, and the surrounding rural area. Marshall has a seven-member Board of Education that governs the district and selects the superintendent.

The district administers two elementary schools, one middle school, one high school, and a virtual school, for a total of five schools. The physical offices for this school are located out of the district, in Whitewater, Wisconsin.

== Schools ==
School	Year built	Description
Marshall High School	1998	Serves grades 9–12.
Marshall Middle School		Serves grades 7–8.
Marshall Elementary School		Serves grades 3–6.
Marshall Early Learning Center		Serves grades 4K(four year old Pre-K)–2.
JEDI Virtual School	1996	Serves grades 4K–12 in participating districts.

== Athletics ==
Marshall's athletic mascot is the Cardinal, and they have been members of the Capitol Conference since 2001.

=== Athletic conference affiliation history ===
- Madison Suburban Conference (1926-1969)
- Eastern Suburban Conference (1969-2001)
- Capitol Conference (2001-present)
