= Sauk City High School =

Historic school in Sauk County, Wisconsin

- U.S. National Register of Historic Places
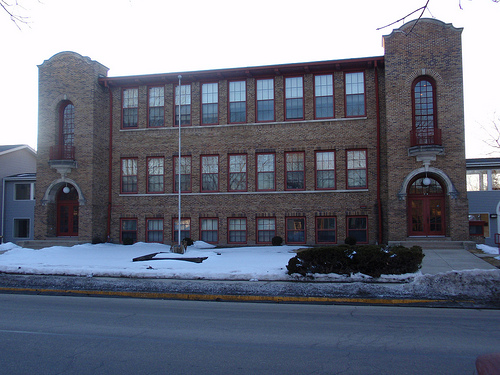

- Location within Wisconsin Location within the United States
- Location: 713 Madison St. Sauk City, Wisconsin
- Coordinates: 43.272778°N 89.725833°W
- Built: 1916
- NRHP reference No.: 89000071
- Added to NRHP: 1989-02-23

Sauk City High School is a historic former school established in Sauk City in 1877. A building was constructed for it in 1891. Alfred Clas designed a building for the high school in 1916.

State legislator and education advocate C. C. Kuntz "lived at the school". German was "always" taught at the school. The high school was added to the National Register of Historic Places in 1989. It is at 713 Madison Street.

== See also ==
- National Register of Historic Places listings in Sauk County, Wisconsin
