= DeForest Area High School =

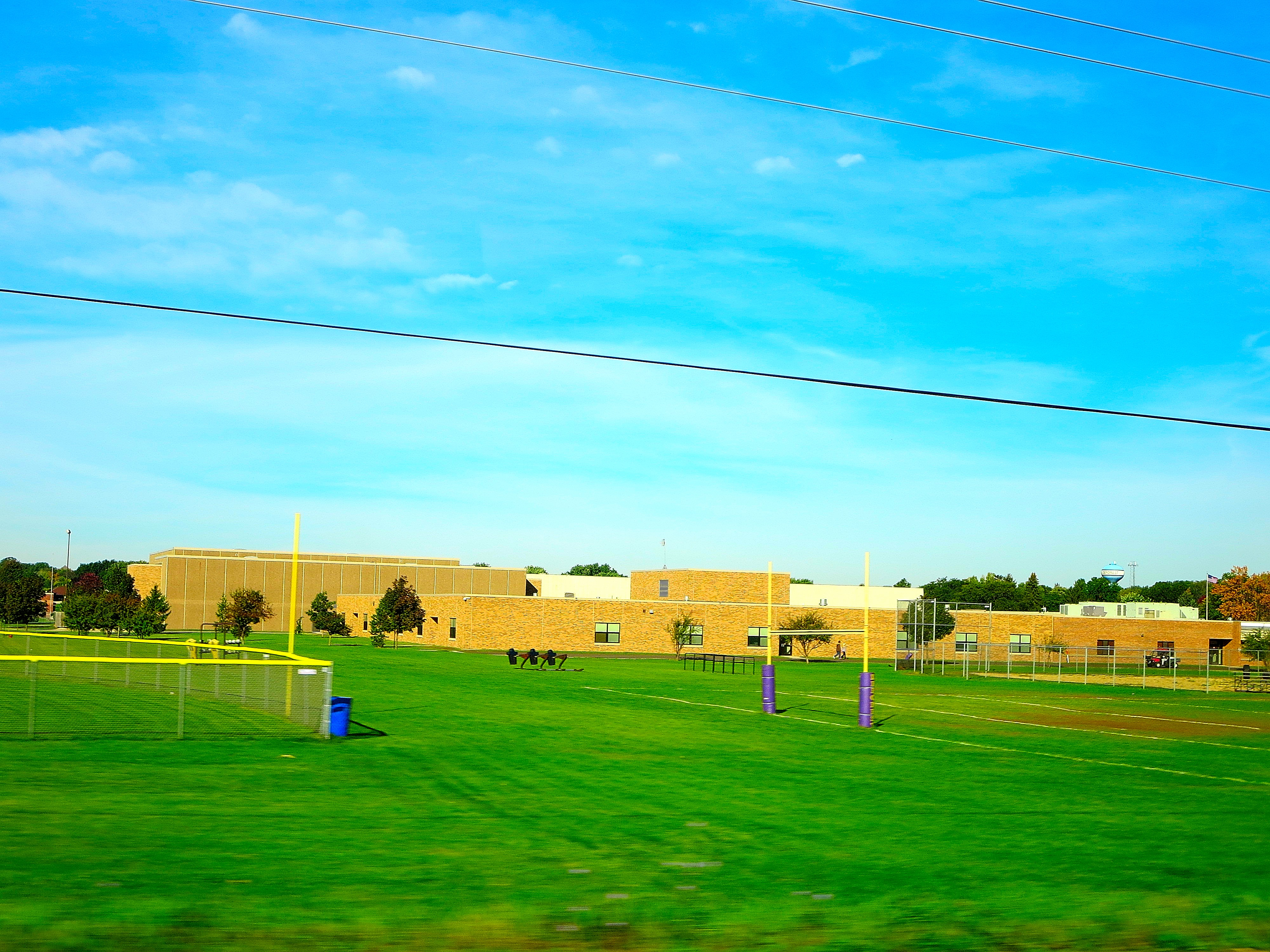

Location
- 815 Jefferson Street; DeForest, Wisconsin; United States; 43.24446°N 89.32719°W

Information
- Type: Public secondary
- Established: 1969
- Status: Open
- Principal: Rouse
- Teaching staff: 78.52 (FTE)
- Grades: 9–12
- Enrollment: 1,118 (2023–2024)
- Student to teacher ratio: 14.24
- Color
- Athletics: Badger Conference
- Mascot: Norskies
- Rival: Waunakee Warriors

DeForest Area High School is a public high school in DeForest, Wisconsin, United States. Part of the DeForest Area School District, the school serves students in grades 9–12. DeForest Area High School enrolls more than 1,000 students from the communities of DeForest, Windsor, parts of Hampden, Leeds, Bristol, Burke, and Vienna, and portions of Madison and Sun Prairie. The school's colors are purple and gold.

== Athletics ==
DeForest's athletic nickname is the Norskies, and they have been members of the Badger Conference since 1987.

=== Athletic conference affiliation history ===
- Madison Suburban Conference (1926-1969)
- Capitol Conference (1969-1987)
- Badger Conference (1987–present)

== Notable alumni ==
- Andrea Anders
- Sean Anders
- Patrick Rothfuss
