= Belleville School District (Wisconsin) =

School district in Wisconsin, United States

Address
- 625 W. Church Street Belleville, Dane County, Wisconsin, 53508; United States
- Coordinates: 42.8578°N 89.5461°W

District information
- Type: Public
- Grades: Pre-K/K–12
- School board: Seven members
- Schools: Elementary (1); Middle (1); High (1)
- NCES District ID: 5500990

Students and staff
- Students: 955 (2023-2024)

Other information
- Website: www.belleville.k12.wi.us

The Belleville School District is a school district based in the village of Belleville, Wisconsin. It serves the village of Belleville, and the surrounding rural area. The district has a seven-member Board of Education that governs the district and selects the superintendent.

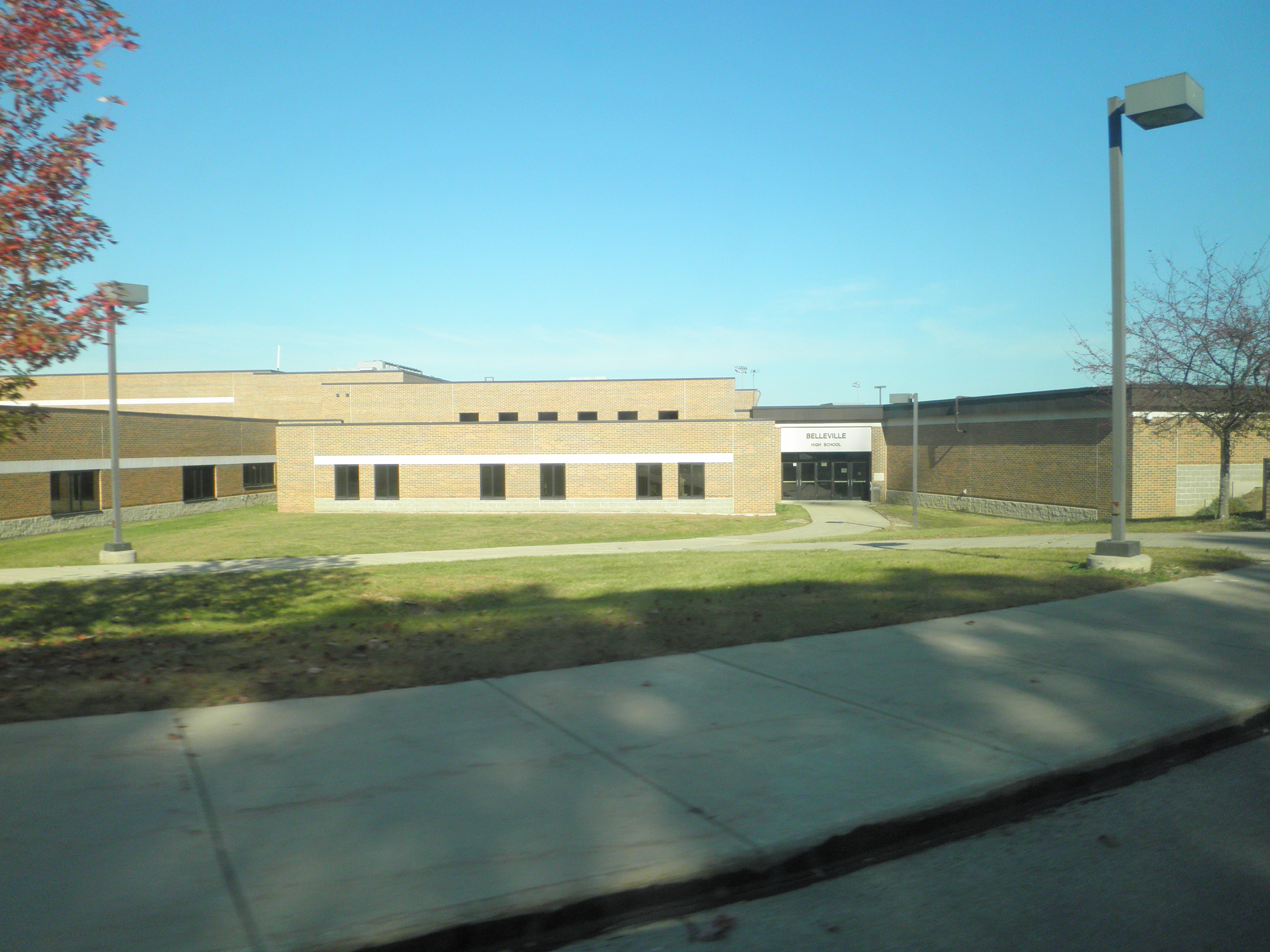
Belleville High School

The district administers an elementary school, one middle school, and one high school, for a total of three schools.

== Schools ==
School	Year built	Description
Belleville High School	1997	Serves grades 9-12.
Belleville Middle School		Serves grades 7-8. Adjacent to the High School.
Belleville Elementary School		Serves grades PreK-6. Located on the same property as the Middle/High School.

== Athletics ==
Belleville's athletic teams are called the Wildcats, and they have been members of the Capitol Conference since 2006.

=== Athletic conference affiliation history ===
- State Line League (1927-1997)
- Six Rivers Conference (1997-2006)
- Capitol Conference (2006-present)
