= Poynette High School =

Coordinates: 43°23′22.6″N 89°23′47.0″W

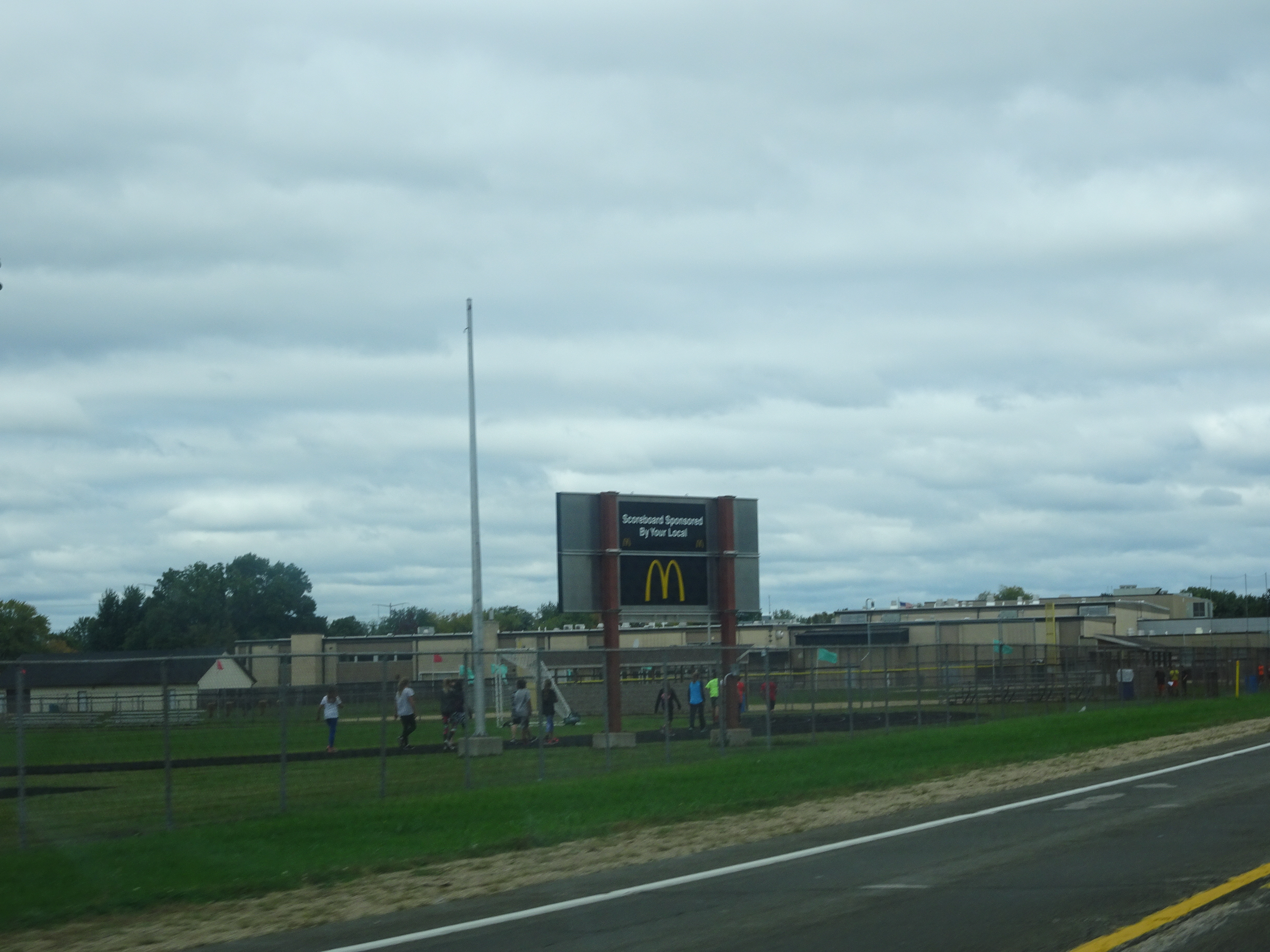

Location
- 108 North Cleveland Street; Poynette, (Columbia County), Wisconsin 53955; United States

Information
- Type: Public high school
- School district: Poynette School District
- Principal: Dr. Mark Hoernke
- Staff: 23.97 (FTE)
- Enrollment: 307 (2022-23)
- Student to teacher ratio: 12.81
- Colors: Orange and black
- Fight song: "Illinois Fight Song"
- Athletics conference: Capitol North
- Nickname: Pumas
- Website: https://www.poynette.k12.wi.us/schools/high/

Poynette High School is a secondary school in Poynette, Wisconsin. The school is part of the Poynette School District.

As of the 2017–18 school year, the student enrollment at PHS was 335. It shares its campus with Poynette Elementary School. The school colors are orange and black and the athletic teams are known as the Pumas. They were known as the Indians until October 1, 2009, when the new Pumas nickname and mascot were announced.

Poynette won the Wisconsin Interscholastic Athletic Association state softball titles in 1998 (Division 2), 2005, 2011, 2018, 2019, 2022, and 2025. (Division 3).

== Athletic conference affiliation history ==
- Columbia County Little Six (1926-1934)
- Columbia County Little Seven (1934-1939)
- Dual County Conference (1939-1954)
- Tri-County League (1954-1963)
- Madison Suburban Conference (1963-1969)
- Capitol Conference (1969-1977)
- Dual County Conference (1977-1987)
- Capitol Conference (1987-2001)
- South Central Conference (2001-2006)
- Capitol Conference (2006–present)
