= Cambridge School District (Wisconsin) =

School district in Wisconsin, United States

Address
- 403 Blue Jay Way Cambridge, Jefferson County, Wisconsin, 53523; United States
- Coordinates: 43.0057°N 89.0104°W

District information
- Type: Public
- Grades: Pre-K/K–12
- School board: Seven members
- Schools: Elementary (2); Middle (1); High (1)
- NCES District ID: 5502100

Students and staff
- Students: 909 (2023-2024)

Other information
- Website: www.cambridge.k12.wi.us

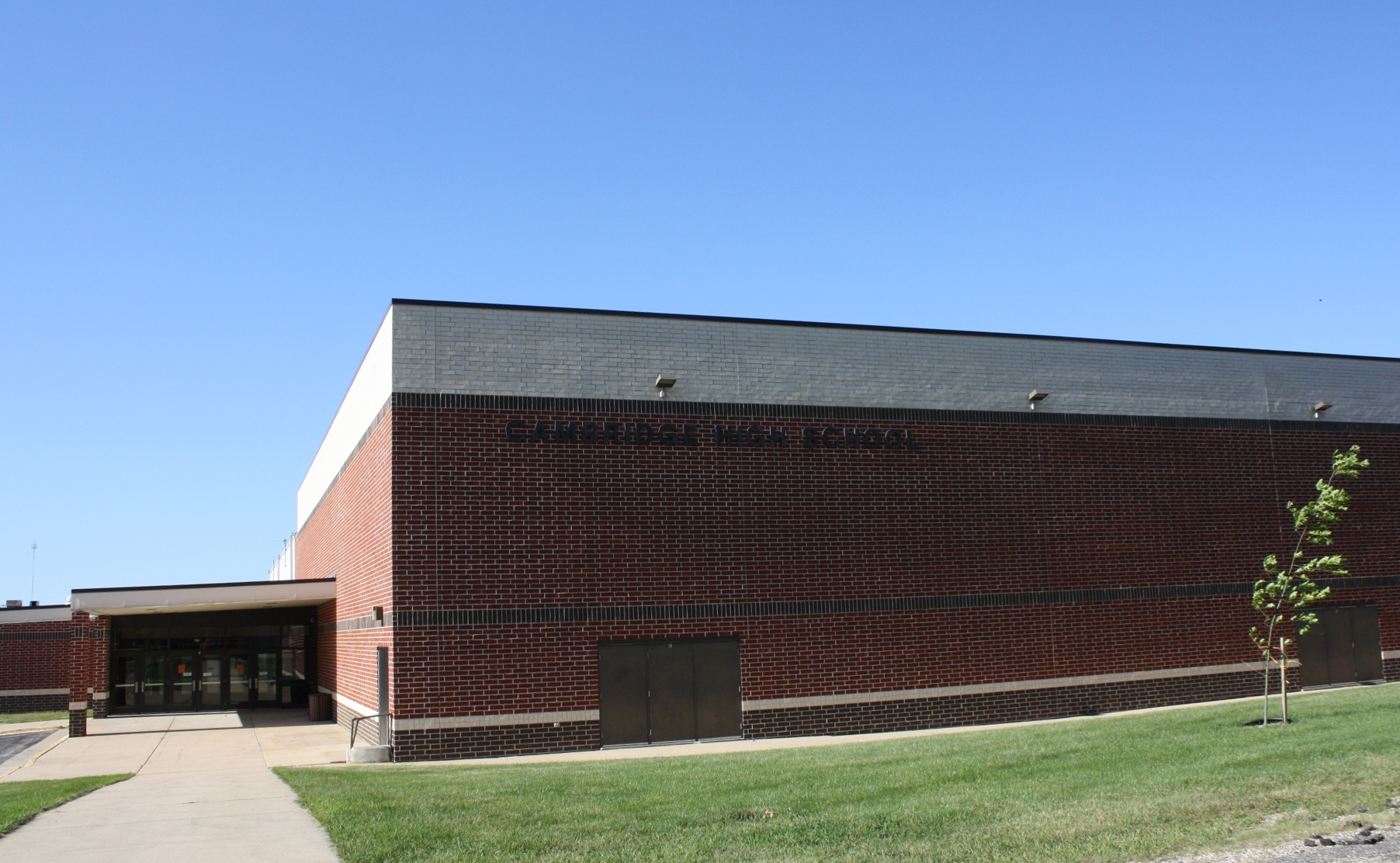
Cambridge High School

The Cambridge School District is a school district in the village of Cambridge, Wisconsin. It serves the villages of Cambridge, Rockdale, and census-designated place of Lake Ripley, Wisconsin.

== Schools ==
School	Year built	Description
Cambridge High School (Wisconsin)	1970	
Nikolay Middle School	1991	
Koshkonong Trails School	2018	Public charter school with a focus on agricultural education.
Cambridge Elementary School		

== See also ==
- Cambridge Public School and High School – former school building in Cambridge
