= Belleville, Wisconsin =

- Village
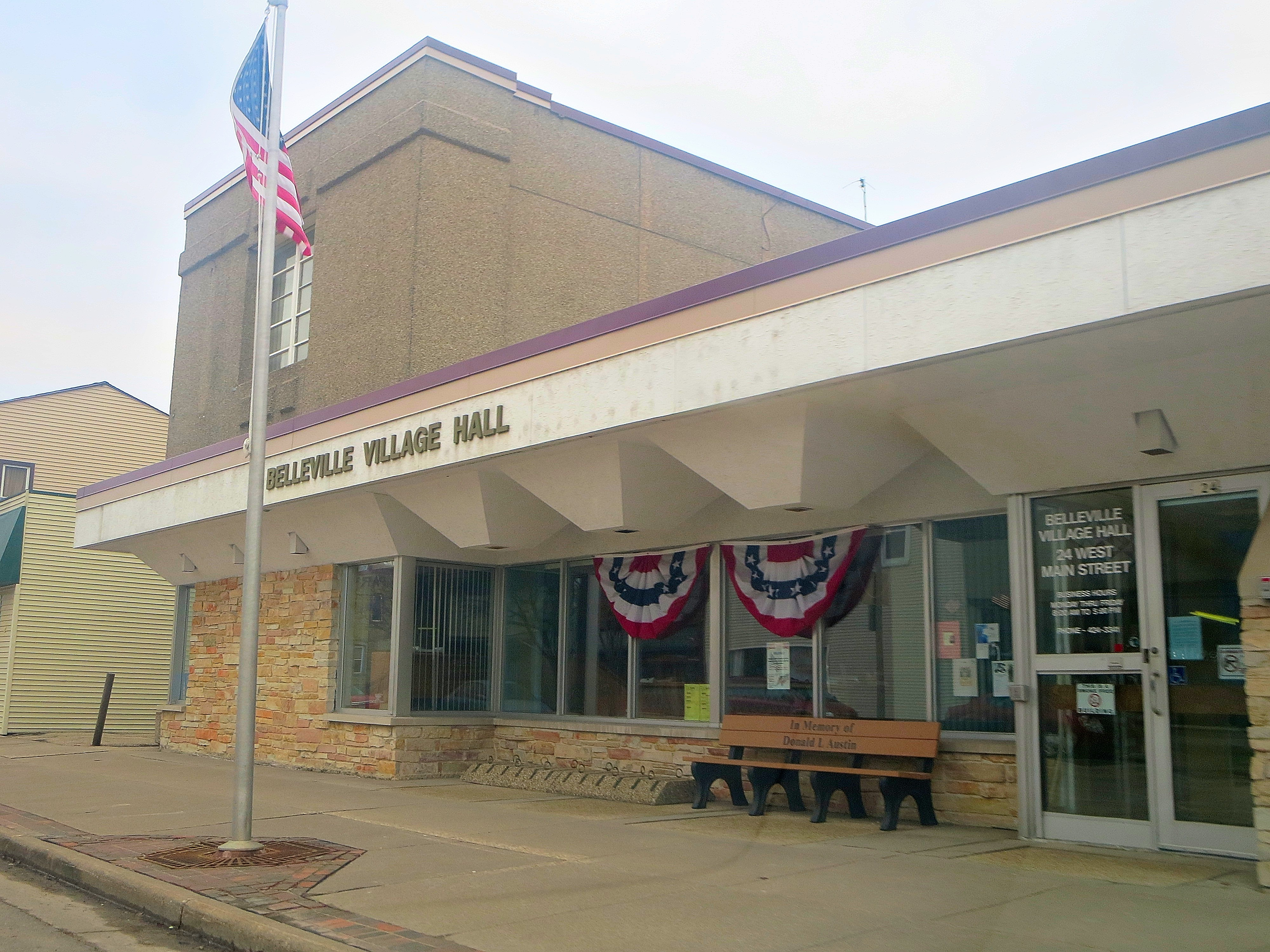
- Village hall

- Location of Belleville in Dane County, Wisconsin.
- Coordinates: 42°52′12″N 89°32′17″W
- Country: United States
- State: Wisconsin
- Counties: Dane, Green

Area
  - Total: 1.81 sq mi (4.68 km^{2})
  - Land: 1.59 sq mi (4.11 km^{2})
  - Water: 0.22 sq mi (0.57 km^{2})
- Elevation: 860 ft (260 m)

Population (2020)
  - Total: 2,491
  - Density: 1,552.3/sq mi (599.35/km^{2})
- Time zone: UTC-6 (Central (CST))
  - Summer (DST): UTC-5 (CDT)
- Area code: 608
- FIPS code: 55-06300
- GNIS feature ID: 1582786
- Website: www.bellevillewi.gov

Belleville is a village in Dane and Green counties in the U.S. state of Wisconsin. The population was 2,491 at the 2020 census. Of this, 1,909 were in Dane County, and 582 were in Green County.

The Dane County portion of Belleville is part of the Madison, Wisconsin metropolitan area, while the Green County portion is part of the Monroe Micropolitan Statistical Area.

== Geography ==
According to the United States Census Bureau, the village has a total area of 1.78 square miles (4.61 km^{2}), of which 1.58 square miles (4.09 km^{2}) is land and 0.20 square miles (0.52 km^{2}) is water.

== Demographics ==
Historical population
Census	Pop.	Note	%±
1860	164		—
1870	132		−19.5%
1890	319		—
1900	385		20.7%
1910	422		9.6%
1920	625		48.1%
1930	564		−9.8%
1940	594		5.3%
1950	735		23.7%
1960	844		14.8%
1970	1,063		25.9%
1980	1,302		22.5%
1990	1,456		11.8%
2000	1,908		31.0%
2010	2,385		25.0%
2020	2,491		4.4%
U.S. Decennial Census

=== 2010 census ===
At the 2010 census there were 2,385 people, 986 households, and 658 families living in the village. The population density was 1,509.5 inhabitants per square mile (582.8/km^{2}). There were 1,030 housing units at an average density of 651.9 units per square mile (251.7 units/km^{2}). The racial makeup of the village was 96.0% White, 0.3% African American, 0.2% Native American, 0.8% Asian, 1.7% from other races, and 1.0% from two or more races. Hispanic or Latino of any race were 3.8%.

Of the 986 households 36.3% had children under the age of 18 living with them, 52.1% were married couples living together, 9.3% had a female householder with no husband present, 5.3% had a male householder with no wife present, and 33.3% were non-families. 26.9% of households were one person and 10.2% were one person aged 65 or older. The average household size was 2.42 and the average family size was 2.96.

The median age in the village was 34.9 years. 26.9% of residents were under the age of 18; 6.4% were between the ages of 18 and 24; 32.4% were from 25 to 44; 24.2% were from 45 to 64; and 10.1% were 65 or older. The gender makeup of the village was 49.1% male and 50.9% female.

=== 2000 census ===
At the 2000 census there were 1,908 people, 764 households, and 540 families living in the village. The population density was 1,648.2 people per square mile (636.4 people/km^{2}). There were 788 housing units at an average density of 680.7 units per square mile (262.8 units/km^{2}). The racial makup of the village was 98.32% White, 0.21% African American, 0.16% Native American, 0.31% Asian, 0.31% from other races, and 0.68% from two or more races. Hispanic or Latino of any race were 0.79%.

Of the 764 households 37.2% had children under the age of 18 living with them, 56.3% were married couples living together, 10.2% had a female householder with no husband present, and 29.2% were non-families. 23.3% of households were one person and 12.3% were one person aged 65 or older. The average household size was 2.48 and the average family size was 2.96.

The age distribution was 28.1% under the age of 18, 5.8% from 18 to 24, 34.2% from 25 to 44, 19.7% from 45 to 64, and 12.2% 65 or older. The median age was 35 years. For every 100 females, there were 94.7 males. For every 100 females age 18 and over, there were 92.8 males.

The median household income was $49,274 and the median family income was $55,909. Males had a median income of $33,897 versus $26,038 for females. The per capita income for the village was $21,784. About 2.3% of families and 5.2% of the population were below the poverty line, including 8.5% of those under age 18 and 10.2% of those age 65 or over.

== History ==
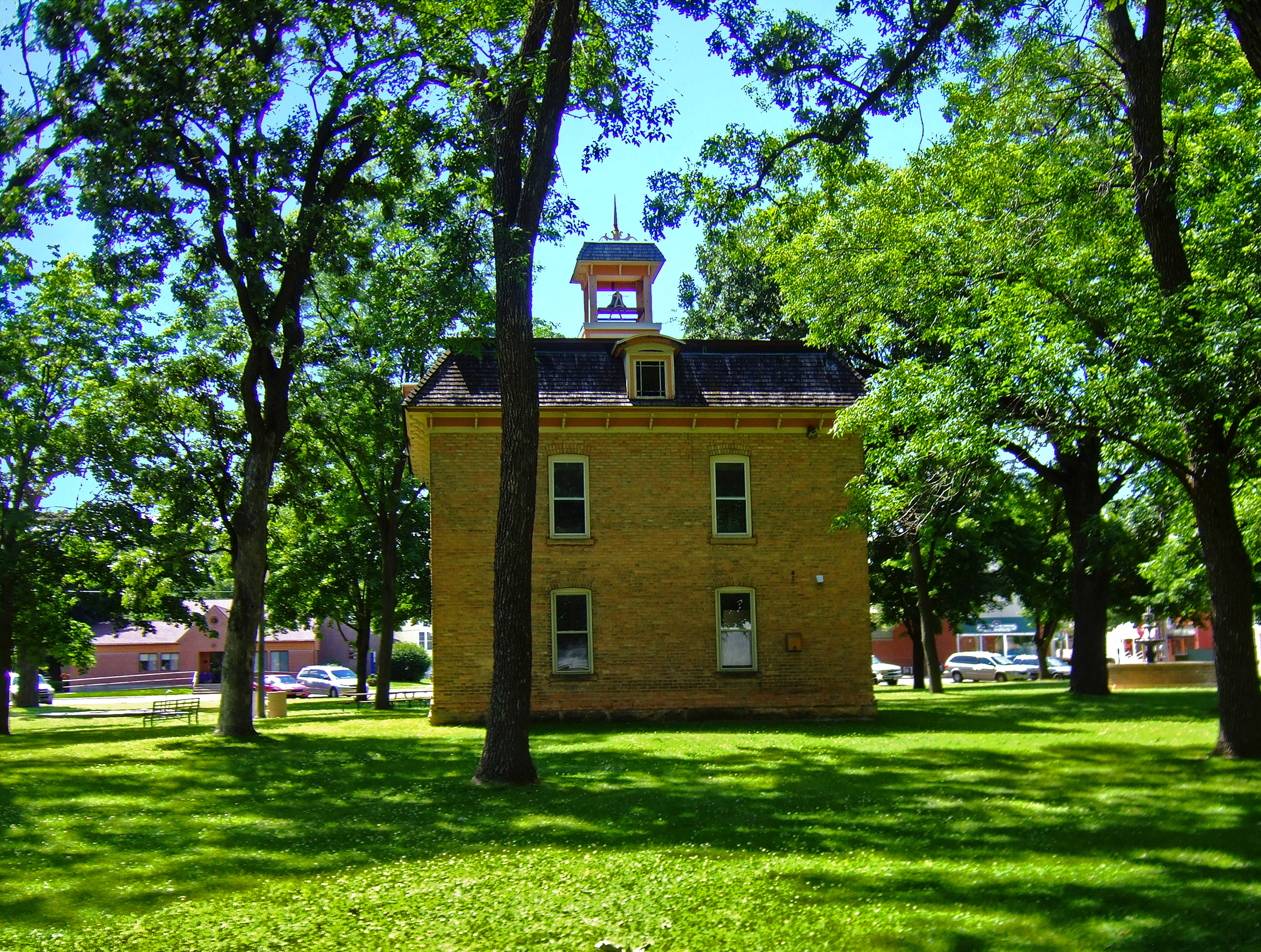
Library Park, with the old Village Hall (1894) in its center, is listed on the National Register of Historic Places

At least some of the land the village now occupies was owned between 1838 and 1841 by Daniel Webster, the American statesman, who also speculated in land on the frontier. In 1845, John Frederick acquired property around the Sugar River and commenced construction of a dam and sawmill, and later a grist mill. By 1850, along with John Mitchell, Frederick platted the village and named it Belleville after his hometown of Belleville, Ontario.

== Media ==
The Post Messenger Recorder is the area's weekly newspaper.

== Education ==
The village is served by the Belleville School District.

== Culture ==
Belleville hosts the Belleville Music Festival in conjunction with ultra running races sponsored by Ten Junk Miles Racing in late July/Early August. In August, Belleville holds its annual Community Picnic featuring activities such as live entertainment, a softball tournament, and a car show. The annual UFO day festival and parade is held the last Saturday in October.

== Notable people ==
- Nancy Fahey, former University of Illinois women's basketball head coach
- William F. Mahar Sr., Illinois state legislator, was born in Belleville.
