= Poynette, Wisconsin =

- Village
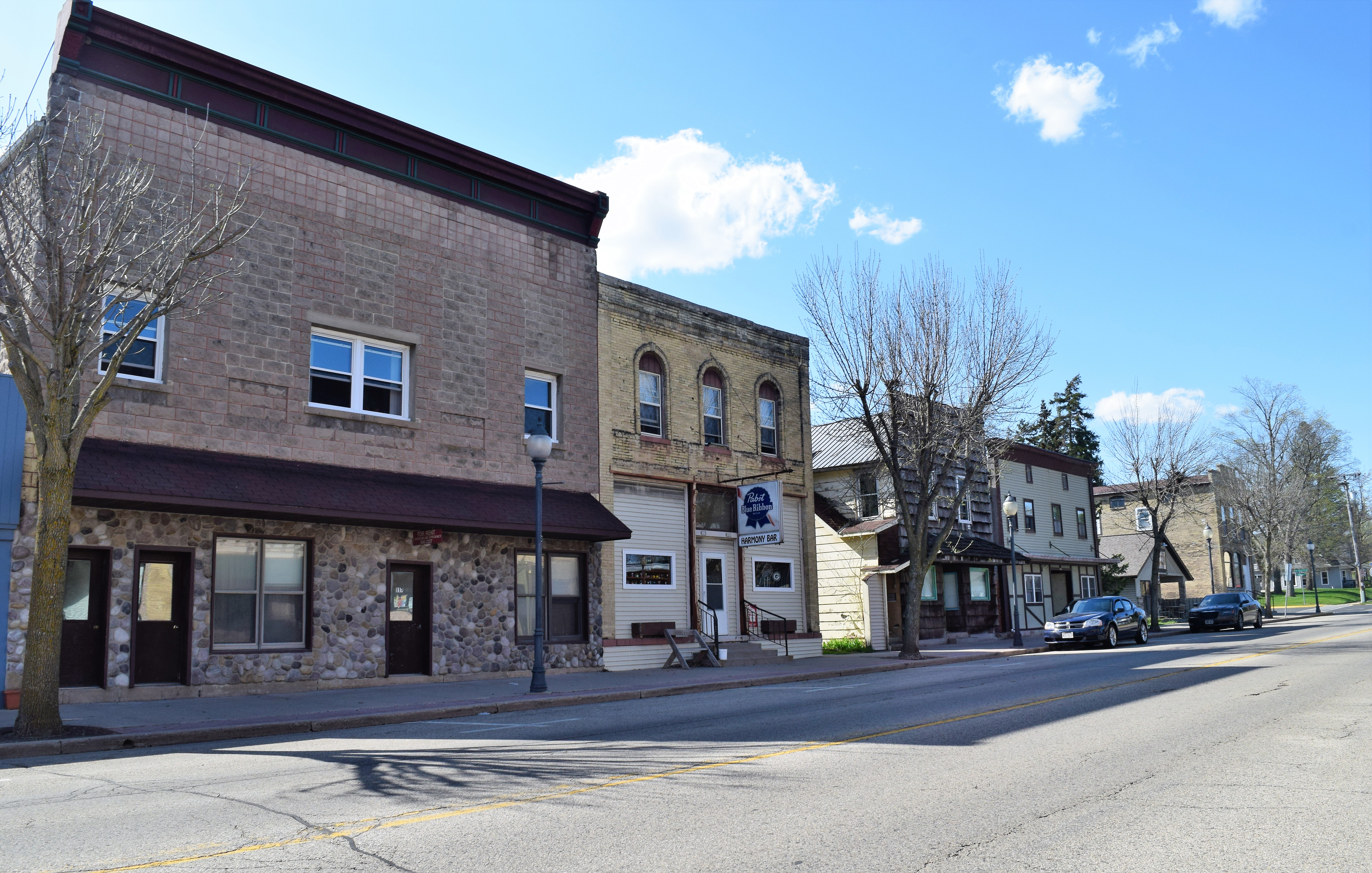
- Downtown Poynette

- Location of Poynette in Columbia County, Wisconsin
- Coordinates: 43°23′32″N 89°24′3″W
- Country: United States
- State: Wisconsin
- County: Columbia

Government

Area
  - Total: 2.59 sq mi (6.72 km^{2})
  - Land: 2.57 sq mi (6.65 km^{2})
  - Water: 0.023 sq mi (0.06 km^{2})
- Elevation: 840 ft (256 m)

Population (2020)
  - Total: 2,590
  - Density: 1,010/sq mi (389/km^{2})
  - Demonym: Poynesian
- Time zone: UTC-6 (Central (CST))
  - Summer (DST): UTC-5 (CDT)
- Area code: 608
- FIPS code: 55-64900
- GNIS feature ID: 1571865
- Website: www.poynette-wi.gov

Poynette is a village in Columbia County, Wisconsin, United States. The population was 2,590 at the 2020 census. It is part of the Madison, Wisconsin metropolitan area.

== History ==
Poynette was named after Pierre Paquette, an early fur trader and settler of south central Wisconsin. When an application was made for a post office in the settlement, Paquette's name was misread as Poynette, and the post office was mistakenly named "Poynette". The village was then named after the post office. The community was incorporated in 1892.

== Geography ==
The Village of Poynette is located in Sections 34 and 35 of the Town of Dekorra (T 11 N, R 9 E), at 43°23′32″N 89°24′3″W (43.392, -89.401).

According to the United States Census Bureau, the village has a total area of 2.58 square miles (6.68 km^{2}), of which 2.55 square miles (6.60 km^{2}) is land and 0.03 square miles (0.08 km^{2}) is water.

== Demographics ==
Historical population
Census	Pop.	Note	%±
1870	300		—
1880	366		22.0%
1890	517		41.3%
1900	533		3.1%
1910	656		23.1%
1920	724		10.4%
1930	672		−7.2%
1940	870		29.5%
1950	969		11.4%
1960	1,090		12.5%
1970	1,118		2.6%
1980	1,447		29.4%
1990	1,662		14.9%
2000	2,266		36.3%
2010	2,528		11.6%
2020	2,590		2.5%
U.S. Decennial Census

=== 2010 census ===
As of the census of 2010, there were 2,528 people, 1,046 households, and 670 families living in the village. The population density was 991.4 inhabitants per square mile (382.8/km^{2}). There were 1,122 housing units at an average density of 440 per square mile (169.9/km^{2}). The racial makeup of the village was 96.6% White, 0.9% African American, 0.8% Native American, 0.3% Asian, 0.1% from other races, and 1.2% from two or more races. Hispanic or Latino people of any race were 1.6% of the population.

There were 1,046 households, of which 35.9% had children under the age of 18 living with them, 47.9% were married couples living together, 11.6% had a female householder with no husband present, 4.6% had a male householder with no wife present, and 35.9% were non-families. 30.6% of all households were made up of individuals, and 12.7% had someone living alone who was 65 years of age or older. The average household size was 2.41 and the average family size was 3.01.

The median age in the village was 36.8 years. 26.8% of residents were under the age of 18; 7.2% were between the ages of 18 and 24; 29.2% were from 25 to 44; 26% were from 45 to 64; and 10.8% were 65 years of age or older. The gender makeup of the village was 49.3% male and 50.7% female.

=== 2000 census ===
As of the census of 2000, there were 2,266 people, 919 households, and 578 families living in the village. The population density was 939.3 people per square mile (363/km^{2}). There were 957 housing units at an average density of 396.7 per square mile (153.3/km^{2}). The racial makeup of the village was 97.35% White, 0.22% African American, 0.53% Native American, 0.09% Asian, 0.71% from other races, and 1.1% from two or more races. Hispanic or Latino people of any race were 1.46% of the population.

There were 919 households, out of which 35.8% had children under the age of 18 living with them, 48.3% were married couples living together, 9.2% had a female householder with no husband present, and 37% were non-families. 30.5% of all households were made up of individuals, and 13.9% had someone living alone who was 65 years of age or older. The average household size was 2.46 and the average family size was 3.04.

In the village, the population was spread out, with 28.4% under the age of 18, 7.1% from 18 to 24, 34% from 25 to 44, 18.9% from 45 to 64, and 11.5% who were 65 years of age or older. The median age was 34 years. For every 100 females, there were 103.6 males. For every 100 females age 18 and over, there were 99.8 males.

The median income for a household in the village was $45,000, and the median income for a family was $53,804. Males had a median income of $35,813 versus $25,098 for females. The per capita income for the village was $18,962. About 3.1% of families and 6% of the population were below the poverty line, including 5.7% of those under age 18 and 11.5% of those age 65 or over.

== Education ==
Poynette is served by the Poynette School District, which includes Poynette High School, Poynette Middle School and Arlington Elementary Schools.

== Notable people ==
- Augustus O. Dole, Wisconsin State Representative
- Elmer E. Haight, Wisconsin State Representative and postmaster at Poynette
- Hugh Pierce Jamieson, Wisconsin State Representative
- Wesley L. Packard, Wisconsin State Representative
- Harry Luman Russell, educator
