= Sun Prairie East High School =

Public high school in Sun Prairie, Wisconsin, United States

Location
- 888 Grove Street; Sun Prairie, Wisconsin 53590; United States; 43.17328°N 89.20952°W

Information
- Type: Public high school
- Established: 2022
- Sister school: Sun Prairie West High School
- School district: Sun Prairie Area School District
- Principal: Jim Ertel
- Teaching staff: 93.62 (FTE)
- Grades: 9–12
- Enrollment: 1,340 (2024–2025)
- Student to teacher ratio: 14.31
- Colors: Cardinal red, white, and black
- Mascot: Curt the Cardinal
- Nickname: Cardinals
- Rival: Sun Prairie West High School
- Yearbook: The Cardinal
- Feeder schools: Central Heights Middle School Patrick Marsh Middle School
- Website: www.sunprairieschools.org/east-high
- SPEHS is one of 2 high schools created from the splitting of Sun Prairie High School in 2022, the other being Sun Prairie West High School

Sun Prairie East High School (SPEHS) is a public high school in Sun Prairie, Wisconsin, United States. It is one of two high schools in the Sun Prairie Area School District, the other being Sun Prairie West High School. During the 2022-2023 school year, there were 1,365 students at Sun Prairie East High School. SPEHS is a WIAA Division 1 school and is a member of the Big Eight athletic conference in all sports except for football, in which it is a WIAA Division 2 school and a member of the Badger Conference.

In the summer of 2010, Sun Prairie High School moved to a new building in the southeast part of town. The former school became a combined 8th and 9th grade upper middle school and was named Cardinal Heights Upper Middle School. Cardinal Heights later became a 6th-8th grade middle school and was renamed to Central Heights Middle School. In 2022, the school split into 2 high schools, Sun Prairie West High School and Sun Prairie East High School, with SPWHS getting a new campus on Ironwood Drive and SPEHS keeping the Grove Street Campus.

== Extracurricular activities ==
=== Athletics ===
Sun Prairie East includes a 4-court competition fieldhouse that seats 2,100, an 8-lane olympic-size swimming pool, a weight room, a cardio room, a wrestling room, and has an indoor track inside the fieldhouse.

Sun Prairie East hosts all home football, lacrosse, and some soccer games at Bank of Sun Prairie Stadium at Ashley Field, a multi-purpose stadium that seats 4,000. The stadium was built in 2022 to replace the original Ashley Field that was built in 1953 on the same site, 155 Kroncke Drive. SPEHS shares the venue with Sun Prairie West. The stadium features aluminum bleachers, team rooms, a multi-purpose synthetic turf field with team colors of both high schools, 2 concession stands, multiple restroom facilities, and ample parking.

The SPHS hockey team, a joint team with SPWHS, plays at the Sun Prairie Ice Arena on Grove Street.

==== State championships before split (as Sun Prairie High School) ====
- Baseball: 1974, 1994, 1997, 2005, 2006, 2012, 2013, 2014, 2021
- Bowling: 2015, 2016
- Cross Country (girls): 2016, 2017
- Football: 1995
- Golf (boys): 1991
- Hockey: 1997
- Softball: 2018

==== Conference affiliation history ====
- Madison Suburban Conference (1926-1963)
- Badger Conference (1963-1977)
- Big Eight Conference (1977-present)

=== Academic Decathlon ===
Sun Prairie's Academic Decathlon team has placed in the top three at the Wisconsin state finals five times.

In April 2014, the Sun Prairie Academic Decathlon team represented Wisconsin in the Large School division of the National United States Academic Decathlon online national competition taking fifth place among the large schools. They repeated this in 2016.

=== Music ===
Sun Prairie East includes a Performing Arts Center (PAC) that seats 1,044. The PAC's 2,400 square-foot stage features a 23-line fly system with a full fly loft, an orchestra pit with a removable cover, and a custom-made Wenger Diva acoustical shell system. The PAC is also home to a Steinway D Concert Grand Piano.

The Sun Prairie High School Jazz I has been selected to compete in the Essentially Ellington Jazz Band competition in New York City 15 times since the festival's conception, most recently in 2025. When SPHS split into two, Jazz I became a joint extracurricular between Sun Prairie East High School and Sun Prairie West High School. The SPHS theatre department has been nominated for numerous Jerry Awards for both their cast and crew.

== Notable alumni ==
- Gary Hebl, class of 1969; Wisconsin State Assembly, 2005-present
- Jerry Kaminski, class of 2023; college football quarterback for the North Dakota Fighting Hawks
- John A. List, class of 1987; University of Chicago economist
- Thomas A. Loftus; Wisconsin Legislator and diplomat; Ambassador to Norway, 1993-1997
- Steven Quale, class of 1984; Hollywood film director
- Andy Thompson, class of 1994; major league baseball player with the Toronto Blue Jays, 2000
