= Sun Prairie West High School =

Public high school in Sun Prairie, Wisconsin, United States

Location
- 2850 Ironwood Drive; Sun Prairie, Wisconsin; United States; 43.18054°N 89.27272°W

Information
- Type: Public high school
- Established: 2022
- Sister school: Sun Prairie East High School
- School district: Sun Prairie Area School District
- Principal: Peg Shoemaker (interim)
- Grades: 9–12
- Enrollment: 1,347 (2023-24)
- Colors: Navy blue, light blue, and gray
- Athletics conference: Big Eight Conference
- Mascot: Timber the Wolf
- Nickname: Wolves
- Rival: Sun Prairie East High School
- Yearbook: Legacy
- Feeder schools: Patrick Marsh Middle School Prairie View Middle School
- SPWHS is one of 2 high schools created from the splitting of Sun Prairie High School in 2022, the other being Sun Prairie East High School

Sun Prairie West High School (SPWHS) is a high school in Sun Prairie, Wisconsin, United States. It is one of two high schools in the Sun Prairie Area School District, the other being Sun Prairie East High School. During the 2023-2024 school year, there were 1,347 students at Sun Prairie West High School. SPWHS is a WIAA Division 1 school and is a member of the Big Eight athletic conference in all sports except for football, in which it is a WIAA Division 2 school and a member of the Badger Conference.

In the summer of 2010, Sun Prairie High School moved to a new building in the southeast part of town. The former school became a combined 8th and 9th grade upper middle school and was named Cardinal Heights Upper Middle School. Cardinal Heights later became a 6th-8th grade middle school and was renamed to Central Heights Middle School. In 2022, the school split into 2 high schools, Sun Prairie West High School and Sun Prairie East High School, with SPWHS getting a new campus on Ironwood Drive and SPEHS keeping the Grove Street Campus.

The school was opened in a ribbon-cutting ceremony on August 28, 2022, with Wisconsin governor Tony Evers in attendance. The construction of SPWHS was the culmination of an effort that started in 2019 with a $164,000,000 referendum.

== Extracurricular activities ==
=== Athletics ===
Sun Prairie West includes a 3-court competition fieldhouse that seats 2,100, 2 single-court auxiliary gyms, an 8-lane olympic-size swimming pool with 2nd floor spectator seating, a weight room, a cardio room, a wrestling room, and has an indoor track on the 2nd floor circling the fieldhouse. The south auxiliary gymnasium has an indoor pole vault for the track and field team, and several extra features designed for gymnastics, including a foam pit. The south gym is the home of the Sun Prairie Gymnastics Team, which is a co-op team between SPWHS and SPEHS; and also features a pole vault and long jump pit for the track team.

Sun Prairie West hosts all home football, lacrosse, and some soccer games at Bank of Sun Prairie Stadium at Ashley Field, a multi-purpose stadium that seats 4,000. The stadium was built in 2022 to replace the original Ashley Field that was built in 1953 on the same site, 155 Kroncke Drive. SPWHS shares the venue with Sun Prairie East. The stadium features aluminum bleachers, team rooms, a multi-purpose synthetic turf field with team colors of both high schools, 2 concession stands, multiple restroom facilities, and ample parking.

The SPHS hockey team, a co-op team with SPEHS, plays at the Sun Prairie Ice Arena on Grove Street.

==== State championships before split (as Sun Prairie High School) ====
- Baseball: 1974, 1994, 1997, 2005, 2006, 2012, 2013, 2014, 2021
- Bowling: 2015, 2016
- Cross Country (girls): 2016, 2017
- Football: 1995
- Golf (boys): 1991
- Hockey: 1997
- Softball: 2018

==== Conference affiliation history ====
- Big Eight Conference (2022–present)

=== Academic Decathlon ===
Sun Prairie's Academic Decathlon team has placed in the top three at the Wisconsin state finals five times.

In April 2014, the Sun Prairie Academic Decathlon team represented Wisconsin in the Large School division of the National United States Academic Decathlon online national competition taking fifth place among the large schools. They repeated this in 2016.

=== Music ===
Sun Prairie West includes a Performing Arts Center (PAC) that seats 822. The PAC's 2400 square-foot stage features a 24-line fly system with a full fly loft, an orchestra pit with a removable cover, and a custom-made Wenger Diva acoustical shell system. The PAC is also home to a Steinway D Concert Grand Piano. SPWHS also features a black-box theater that seats 120 and features overhead catwalks and tension grids that allow for innovative lighting designs.

The Sun Prairie High School Jazz I has been selected to compete in the Essentially Ellington Jazz Band competition in New York City 15 times since the festival's conception, most recently in 2025. When SPHS split into two, Jazz I became a co-op extracurricular between Sun Prairie East High School and Sun Prairie West High School. The SPWHS theater department has been nominated for numerous Jerry Awards for both their cast and crew.
