= WLSP =

WLSP may refer to:

- WLSP-LP, a low-power radio station (103.5 FM) licensed to serve Sun Prairie, Wisconsin, United States
- WLCO, a radio station (1530 AM) licensed to serve Lapeer, Michigan, United States
