= Dr. Charles G. Crosse House =

Historic house in Wisconsin, United States

- U.S. National Register of Historic Places
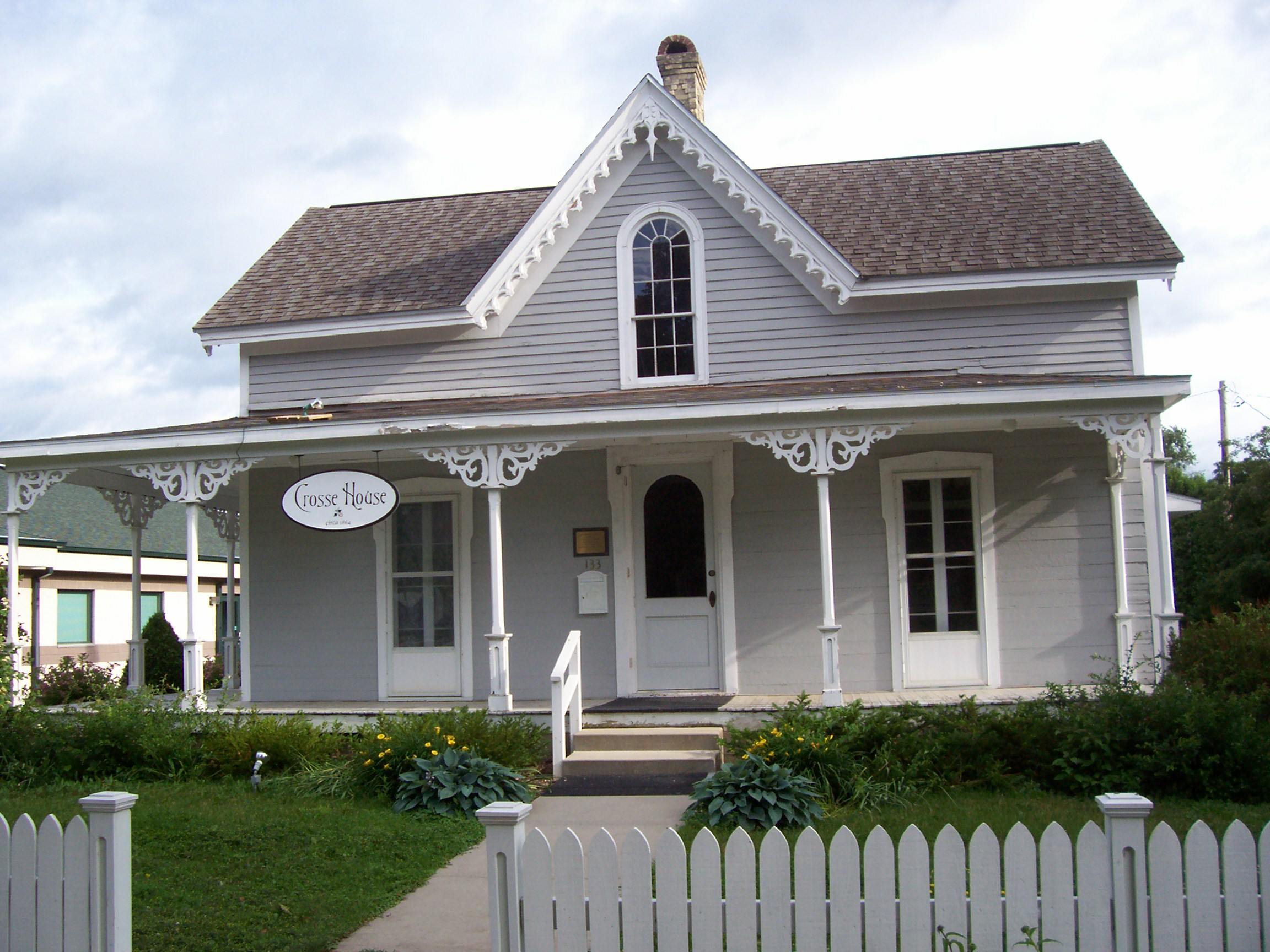
- Crosse house in 2008

- Location within Wisconsin Location within the United States
- Location: 133 W. Main St. Sun Prairie, Wisconsin
- Coordinates: 43°10′59″N 89°12′55″W
- Area: 1 acre (0.40 ha)
- Architectural style: Gothic Revival
- NRHP reference No.: 93000029
- Added to NRHP: February 24, 1993

The Dr. Charles G. Crosse House is a historic home built circa 1865 and located at 133 W. Main Street in Sun Prairie, Wisconsin, United States. It was listed on the National Register of Historic Places in 1993.

Charles G. Crosse moved to Sun Prairie in 1860 and was instrumental in its development. He was the city's doctor and operated a drugstore. Dr. Crosse and his son Charles S. Crosse published a newspaper called The Countryman, which documented the daily activity of the area. He served as village president, on the school board, and as a state legislator.

Shortly after returning from his service as a physician in the Civil War, Crosse built the house that is the subject of this article. The house is 1.5 stories, with a T-shaped floor plan. The style is Carpenter Gothic, clearly marked by the ornate scroll-sawn vergeboards on the gable end, and the decorations on the posts that support the broad front porch. The front door contains a round-topped window, and the tall multi-paned window in the dormer above has a similar round top. On each side of the front door is a French door which opens onto the porch. From the center of the house rises a chimney topped with a brick arch.

Crosse lived in the house until he died in 1908. His family owned the house until 1919. Later it was made into rental units, and was losing its integrity by 1976. In that year a group of preservation-minded citizens got together and began restoring it.
