= Sun Prairie Water Tower =

- U.S. National Register of Historic Places
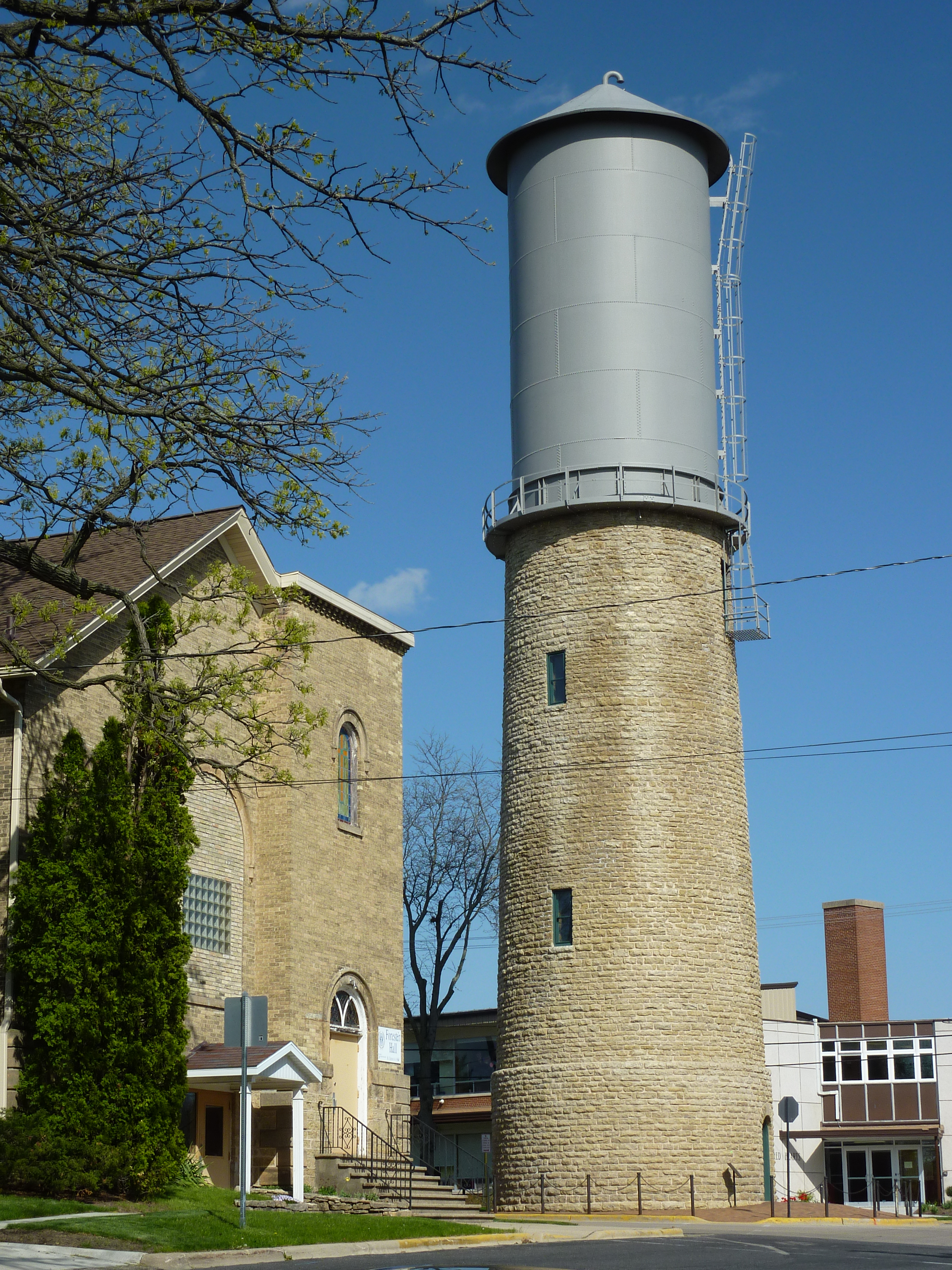
- Sun Prairie Water Tower
- Location: Jct. of Columbus, Church and Cliff Sts., Sun Prairie, Wisconsin
- Coordinates: 43°11′14″N 89°12′39″W
- Area: less than one acre
- Built: 1899/1912
- Architect: Frank Stegerwald
- NRHP reference No.: 00000360
- Added to NRHP: April 6, 2000

The Sun Prairie Water Tower was built in 1899 in Sun Prairie, Wisconsin. It was added to the State Register of Historic Places in 1999 and to the National Register of Historic Places the following year.

The first non-native settlers arrived in Sun Prairie in 1839. In 1840 the road to Madison passed nearby. A sawmill was there by 1847, a hotel by 1850, and the railroad reached town in 1859. The village was incorporated in 1868.

In the late 1800s the village began developing public services. A volunteer fire department formed in 1891. In 1900 a private electric company hung electric wires along Main Street. Before 1899, people got their water from private wells and cisterns. In that year the village trustees and the Sun Prairie Countryman debated building a waterworks, arguing that: "To induce others to settle with us we must have the conveniences that they are used to. To get factories here we must have better fire protection and in order to better our facilities we must have a waterworks." Fear of taxes weighed against. After much debate, a public waterworks was approved by vote.

Stegerwald and Lessner, a local firm, won the bid to build a 60-foot stone tower to support the tank for $1750, and they built it in October and November 1899, re-using stone from the old Stevens Mill five miles northeast on the Maunesha River. The stonework is uniform and carefully done. At the base of the tower, a round-topped door is framed in radiating limestone blocks. Five windows allow light into the tower. A wooden tank originally sat on the tower, bought from Challenge Wind Mill and Feed Mill Company of Batavia. John M. Healy of Chicago provided pipe for the water system, and laid it.

By 1911 the wooden tank was insufficient, and was replaced with a steel tank from Kennicott Water Softener of Chicago. Another flaw was that the original system only took water to homes; it didn't get waste water out of the homes. That problem was resolved in 1918 with a waste water treatment plant.

The NRHP nomination considers the Sun Prairie tower significant for being built of stone, which is rare for a water tower in Wisconsin. It is also significant for its fine stonework, and as a symbol of the movement toward municipal services in the community.
