= Charles G. Crosse =

American politician

Charles Giles Crosse (April 28, 1828 – April 21, 1908) was an American physician and politician.

== Life ==
Crosse was born in Cincinnatus, New York. He attended school in Ohio, followed by study at Western Reserve College and Cincinnati Medical College, where he graduated as a medical doctor in 1853. He married Rowena Smith on September 26, 1853. He practiced medicine in Amherst, Ohio until relocating to Wisconsin in 1854. Crosse moved to Sun Prairie, Wisconsin on January 1, 1860. During the American Civil War, Crosse was a surgeon in the 50th Wisconsin Volunteer Infantry Regiment. After the war he lived in Sun Prairie, where he operated a drugstore called Crosse & Crosse in partnership with his son Theodore. Crosse died at his home in Sun Prairie.

== Political career ==
In 1880, Crosse served in the Wisconsin State Assembly. His house is in Sun Prairie.
