= Sweet Corn Festival =

Annual event in the Midwest of the US

Sweet Corn Festivals are annual events that take place in several locations throughout the Midwest on the weekend before schools resume session during the summer months. The festivals sell a variety of merchandise, from corn on the cob and other food sold by vendors as well as stalls that sell anything from jewelry to CDs. Some of the vendors come from out of state to set up their stalls for the festivals. The events also hosts live music performed by local bands and artists. Locations that have Sweet Corn Festivals include: West Point, Iowa, Sun Prairie, Wisconsin, Adel, Iowa, Cedar Rapids, Iowa, Chatham, Illinois, Mendota, Illinois, and Hoopeston, Illinois.

The Hoopeston National Sweetcorn Festival is the oldest and has been a continuous festival since 1938. The Hoopeston Jaycees have been the main sponsor for over 70 Years. The Festival includes many of the activities mentioned above, as well as a pageant called "The National Sweetheart Pageant" which was originally sanctioned by the Miss America Pageant. Eight contestants from the NSP have become Miss America! Citing a contract change within the Miss America Organization, contestants will no longer be able to participate in both pageants.

The Hoopeston Sweetcorn Festival does not charge for sweetcorn, but rather gives away more than 50 tons of corn each year. The corn is cooked onsight at McFerren Park in Hoopeston, just off IL Route 1, by the steam generated from a vintage steam engine that was once used in the fields surrounding Hoopeston.

That festival was cancelled between 1942–47, and 2020.
