= Sun Prairie Area School District =

School district in Wisconsin, United States

Address
- 501 South Bird Street Sun Prairie, Dane County, Wisconsin, 53590; United States

District information
- Type: Public School District
- Motto: Futures depend on us...every child, every day.
- Grades: Pre-K–12th
- Established: 1842; 184 years ago
- Superintendent: Dr. Antoine Reed
- School board: Sun Prairie School Board
- Chair of the board: Diana McFarland
- Schools: 15 (2022–23)
- NCES District ID: 5514640

Students and staff
- Students: 8,521 (2018-19)
- Teachers: 648 (2018-19)

Other information
- Former Name: Joint School District No. 2 of the City of Sun Prairie and the towns of Blooming Grove, Bristol, Burke, Cottage Grove, Sun Prairie and York, Dane Co. and the Town of Hampden, Columbia Co.
- Website: www.sunprairieschools.org

The Sun Prairie Area School District (SPASD) is located in Dane County, Wisconsin, United States, to the northeast of Madison, Wisconsin. It serves the area around Sun Prairie, Wisconsin. Its district office is located at 501 S. Bird Street, Sun Prairie, Wisconsin, and Bradford Saron is the current superintendent. The Sun Prairie Area School District was founded in 1842, making it legally older than the municipality of Sun Prairie itself (Sun Prairie being legally incorporated as a town in 1846).

The system, which as of the 2018–19 school year has over 8,500 enrolled students and 648 teachers, consists of 9 elementary schools, 3 middle schools, 2 high schools, and an alternative learning high school. Which elementary school (C.H. Bird, Creekside, Eastside, Horizon, Northside, Royal Oaks, Token Springs, Meadow View, or Westside) a child attends is determined by geographic proximity. The same sort of determining factor applies to the three middle schools (Patrick Marsh, Prairie View and Central Heights), and the two high schools (Sun Prairie West and Sun Prairie East).

An alternative high school, Prairie Phoenix Academy, is also operated in a section of the 220 Kroncke Drive building, which is also home to Central Heights Middle School and the district's Professional Learning Center (PLC).

The Sun Prairie Area School District is ranked 8 out of 10 from Great Schools. This rating is based on the schools' test scores.

== History ==
=== Establishment and district background ===
The early settlers in Sun Prairie were firm believers in the public-school system of the country, and organized "Joint School District No. 2 of Sun Prairie" in 1842 (municipality names would be added to the district name as they were established). They subsequently built a wooden schoolhouse. A few years later, a larger schoolhouse was built. Around 1850 the schools became taxpayer-funded, rather than tuition-based (as many school districts in Wisconsin were at inception)

Around 1987, as a result of 1987 Wisconsin Act 46, the district's name was changed from "Joint School District No. 2 of the City of Sun Prairie and the towns of Blooming Grove, Bristol, Burke, Cottage Grove, Sun Prairie and York, Dane Co. and the Town of Hampden, Columbia Co." to "Sun Prairie Area School District".

=== High schools ===
In 1864, the district had outgrown the existing schoolhouse, so, that year, they built a large public school, and it would serve until 1931.

In 1931 a new brick school was built on the same site, and would serve as the high school from its opening until 1959, and as the junior high school from 1959 to 1998, and was expanded in 1973. The old half (built in 1931) was demolished in the early 2000s after serving briefly as a YMCA. The newer 1973 half, which was dated and quickly deteriorating, served as Prairie Phoenix Academy, the district's alternative high school, from 2011-2022. PPA then moved out of this building, and was relocated to a newly renovated portion of the 220 Kroncke Drive building. The old location was demolished in 2022, this becoming the first time since (at least) 1864 that a school had not been located at the 160 South Street property. The site is currently in the process of being redeveloped for additional parking for the Bank of Sun Prairie Stadium at Ashley Field, the district's 4000-seat stadium (which is shared between SPWHS and SPEHS).

In 1959 a new high school was built on Kroncke Drive. It was renovated and expanded multiple times, and served as the high school until 2010. It is currently the home to Central Heights Middle School, Prairie Phoenix Academy, and the district's Professional Learning Center (PLC).

In 2010, a new high school was built on Grove Street.

Sun Prairie West High School, located on Ironwood Drive, opened August 28, 2022 for the 2022-23 school year.

The existing Grove Street campus, therefore, after undergoing renovations to the academic wings, reopened for the 2022-23 school year as Sun Prairie East High School.

== Schools ==
Schools in the Sun Prairie Area School District (SPASD)
School	Grades	Address (Sun Prairie, WI)	Year Established	Current Building - Year Opened	Mascot
Sun Prairie West High School	9-12	2850 Ironwood Drive	2022 (Split from SPHS)	2022	Wolves
Sun Prairie East High School	9-12	888 Grove Street	2022 (Split from SPHS)	2010 (as Sun Prairie High School)	Cardinals
Prairie Phoenix Academy	9-12 (Alternative High School)	220 Kroncke Drive, Suite 130	2011	1959 (as Sun Prairie High School)	Phoenix
Central Heights Middle School	6-8	220 Kroncke Drive, Suite 100	2022	1959 (as Sun Prairie High School)	Huskies
Prairie View Middle School	6-8	400 N. Thompson Road	1998	1998	Falcons
Patrick Marsh Middle School	6-8	1351 Columbus Street	1998	1998	Panthers
C.H. Bird Elementary School	K-5	1170 N. Bird Street	1965	1965	Blue Jays
Creekside Elementary School	K-5	1251 O'Keeffe Avenue	2008	2008	Coyotes
Eastside Elementary School	K-5	661 Elizabeth Lane	1966	1966	Eagles
Horizon Elementary School	K-5	625 N. Heatherstone Drive	2005	2005	Red-Tailed Hawks
Meadow View Elementary School	K-5	200 N. Grand Avenue	2018	2018	Otters
Northside Elementary School	K-5	230 W. Klubertanz Drive	1961	1961	Nighthawks
Royal Oaks Elementary School	K-5	2215 Pennsylvania Avenue	1975	1975	Rockets
Token Springs Elementary School	K-5	1435 N. Thompson Road	2018	2018	Terrapins
Westside Elementary School	K-5	1320 Buena Vista Drive	1966	1966	Wildcats
