= Chase Grain Elevator =

- U.S. National Register of Historic Places
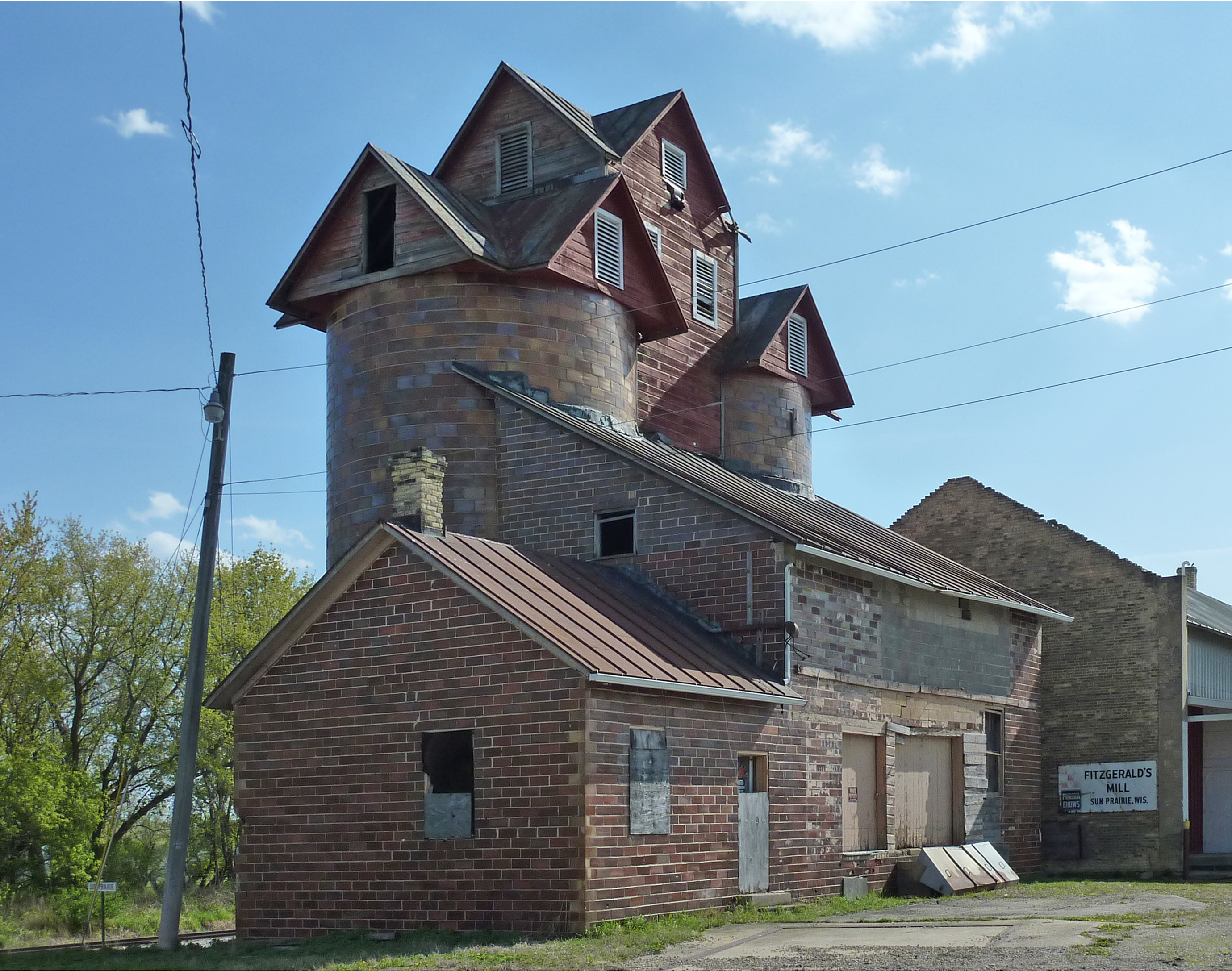
- Location: 123 Railroad St. Sun Prairie, Wisconsin
- Coordinates: 43°10′44″N 89°12′50″W
- Built: 1922
- NRHP reference No.: 10000540
- Added to NRHP: August 12, 2010

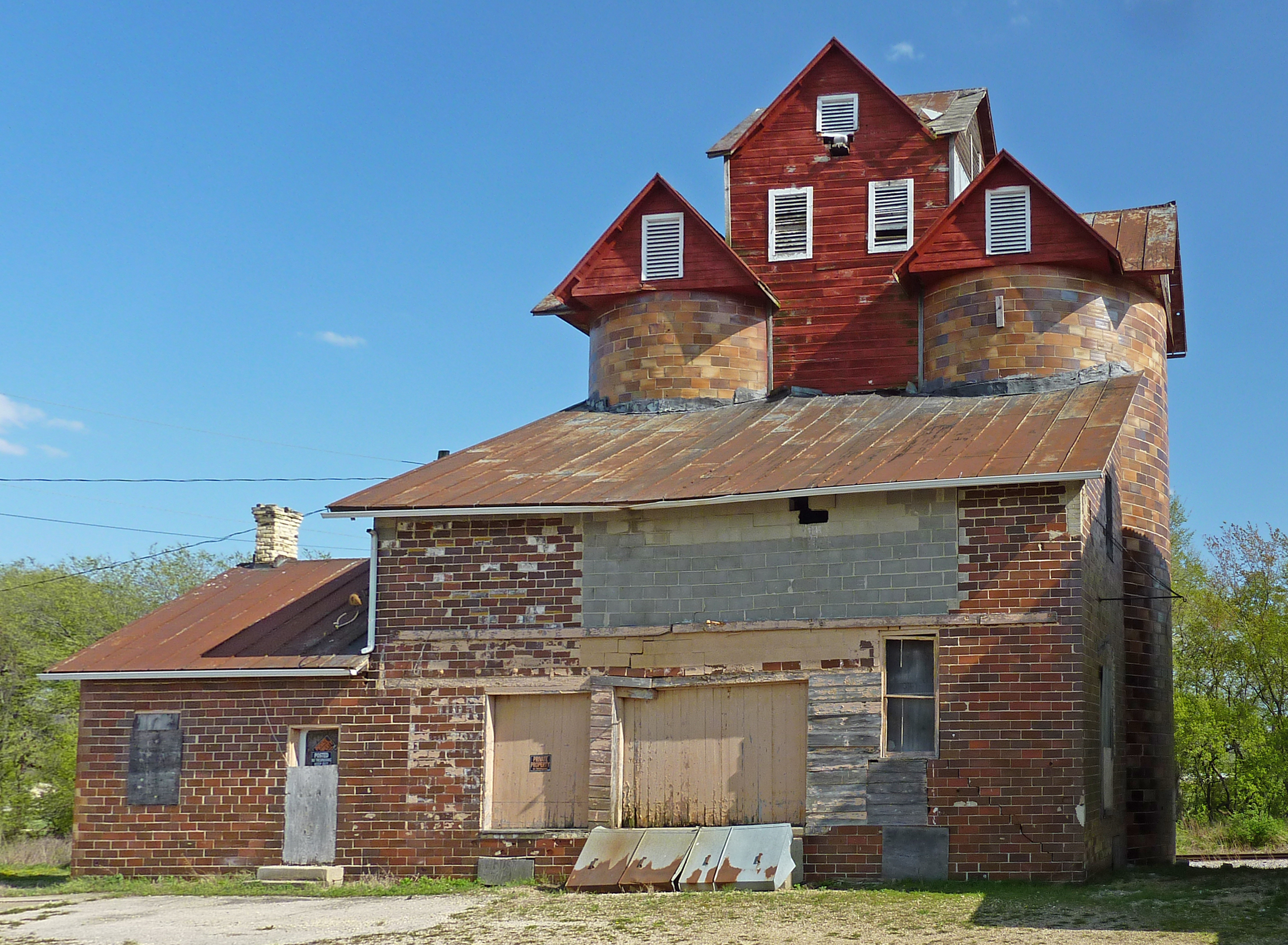

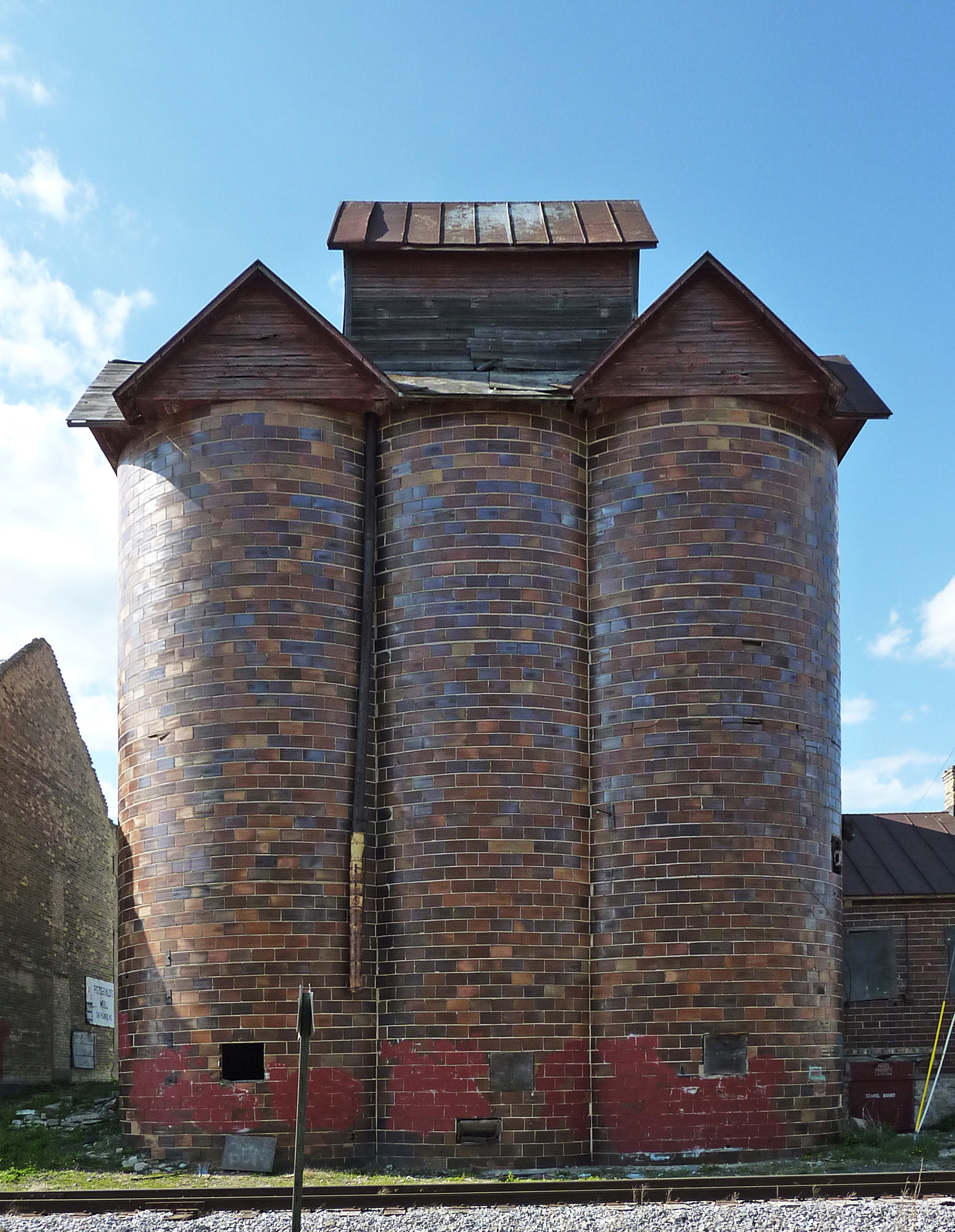
Elevator silos viewed from the railroad tracks, showing the pocket bin in the center.

The Chase Grain Elevator is a grain elevator located in Sun Prairie, Wisconsin. It was built in 1922 and added to the National Register of Historic Places in 2010. It is the last known tile elevator remaining in Wisconsin.

== History ==
Chase Grain Elevator was constructed in 1922 on the site of a previous Chase & Sons elevator that burned down in the winter of 1921–22. The fireproof tile elevator was planned to have a capacity of 13,500 bushels. In March 1922, it was estimated to cost $20,000 (approximately US$384,692 today).

The elevator is said to illustrate experimental construction techniques during the transition from between wood and concrete elevators. Tile elevator construction ended around 1925.

The elevator consists of two cylindrical grain bins, with a third "pocket" bin created from a semi-circle of tile linking the two main bins.
