= Stacy Jo Scott =

American artist and curator

- Born: 1981 (age 44–45)
- Education: BFA, 2010, University of Oregon; MFA, 2012, Cranbrook Academy of Art
- Known for: Digital fabrication and ceramics

Stacy Jo Scott (born 1981) is an American artist, art educator, curator, and writer based in Eugene, Oregon, who works in ceramics and digital fabrication.

== Early life and education ==
Stacy Jo Scott grew up in Sun Prairie, Wisconsin. Scott earned a BFA (summa cum laude) in Ceramics from the University of Oregon in 2010, and an MFA in Ceramics at Cranbrook Academy of Art in 2012. Scott resided in Nottingham Cooperative in Madison, Wisconsin from 2000 to 2003

== Career ==
from "At-Home 3-D Printing & the Return of a Craft Utopia"

"The Web was just the proof of concept. Now the revolution hits the real world." With these words, Chris Anderson, editor of Wired magazine, joins Makerbot and RepRap creators and countless breathless bloggers in heralding the dawn of a technology that promises to bring to bear the same force that upturned media industries to manufacturing industries. This technology is desktop 3D printing which used 3D object files to build up an object through the deposition of layers of raw material. ...The tools of industrial design seem tantalizingly close, open to all. Given that object data is easily exchanged, edited and endlessly vast, the potential for revolution seems only logical. The manufacturing industry is destabilized and individuals regain an agency lost since the first industrial revolution. ...An especially interesting corollary can be found in the utopian project of craft-idealists like William Morris... Morris, usually described as anti-machine, deserves a re-reading for how he saw the machine in terms of idealized craft production. Morris called for machinery as a "help to the workman's hand-labor and not a supplanter of it". ...Also, "machines of the most ingenious and best-approved kinds will be used when necessary, but will be used simply to save human labor".

— Stacy Jo Scott

Scott generates artworks in ceramics and other media with digital production methods. She refers to her creative practice as tracking "the shifting edge between the seen and unseen." She says she creates objects "in the continuum between technology and embodiment, materiality and the virtual, order and chance, language and silence." Scott works both independently and collaboratively as a part of the Craft Mystery Cult Performance collaborative, described as "a group tracing the relationship of object materiality and human interaction".

=== Art education ===
In 2013, Scott was the Franzen Fellow for Digital Craft at Colorado State University-Fort Collins. From 2015 to 2017, she was a Lecturer in the Department of Art Practice at the University of California-Berkeley. She also has taught at The Golden Dome School For Performing Planetary Rites. Scott joined the faculty of the Art Department of the University of Oregon in 2017.

=== Curatorial practice ===
Speaking about "New Morphologies: Studio Ceramics and Digital Practices" at Schein-Joseph International Museum of Ceramic Art at Alfred University, which she curated with Del Harrow in 2013, Scott said, "What most excites me about digital fabrication are the ways in which it continues to enact our very human striving to bring form to an ideal." The exhibit highlighted "work that emerges from the encounter between the physical materiality of ceramic objects and the ephemerality of digital information".

== Selected exhibitions ==
- Rise Out of the Scattered Deep, Abrams Claghorn Gallery, Albany, CA. (2016)
- Setting The Table, with Iris Eichenberg, Paul Kotula Projects, Ferndale, MI. (2013)
- The Hapticon of the Craft Mystery Cult, Roots & Culture, Contemporary Art Center, Chicago, IL. (2012)

== Selected publications ==
- Scott, Stacy Jo (Winter 2009). "Crafting a Way Through Crisis" (PDF). Studio Potter. 38 (1): 99.
- Scott, Stacy Jo (September 12, 2010). "At-Home 3D Printing and the Return of a Craft Utopia: Part 1". The Journal of Modern Craft.
- Scott, Stacy Jo (September 19, 2010). "At-Home 3D Printing and the Return of a Craft Utopia: Part 2". The Journal of Modern Craft.
- Dahl, Sonja; de la Paz, Jovencio; Scott, Stacy Jo (June 13, 2016). "Notes on Craft and Collaboration: Reflections on the Digital Realm as a Site for Collaboration". Textile: Cloth and Culture. 14: 98–109. doi:10.1080/14759756.2016.1142785. S2CID 114991153.

== See also ==
- Digital arts
- 3D computer graphics
