= Fuhremann Canning Company Factory =

- U.S. National Register of Historic Places
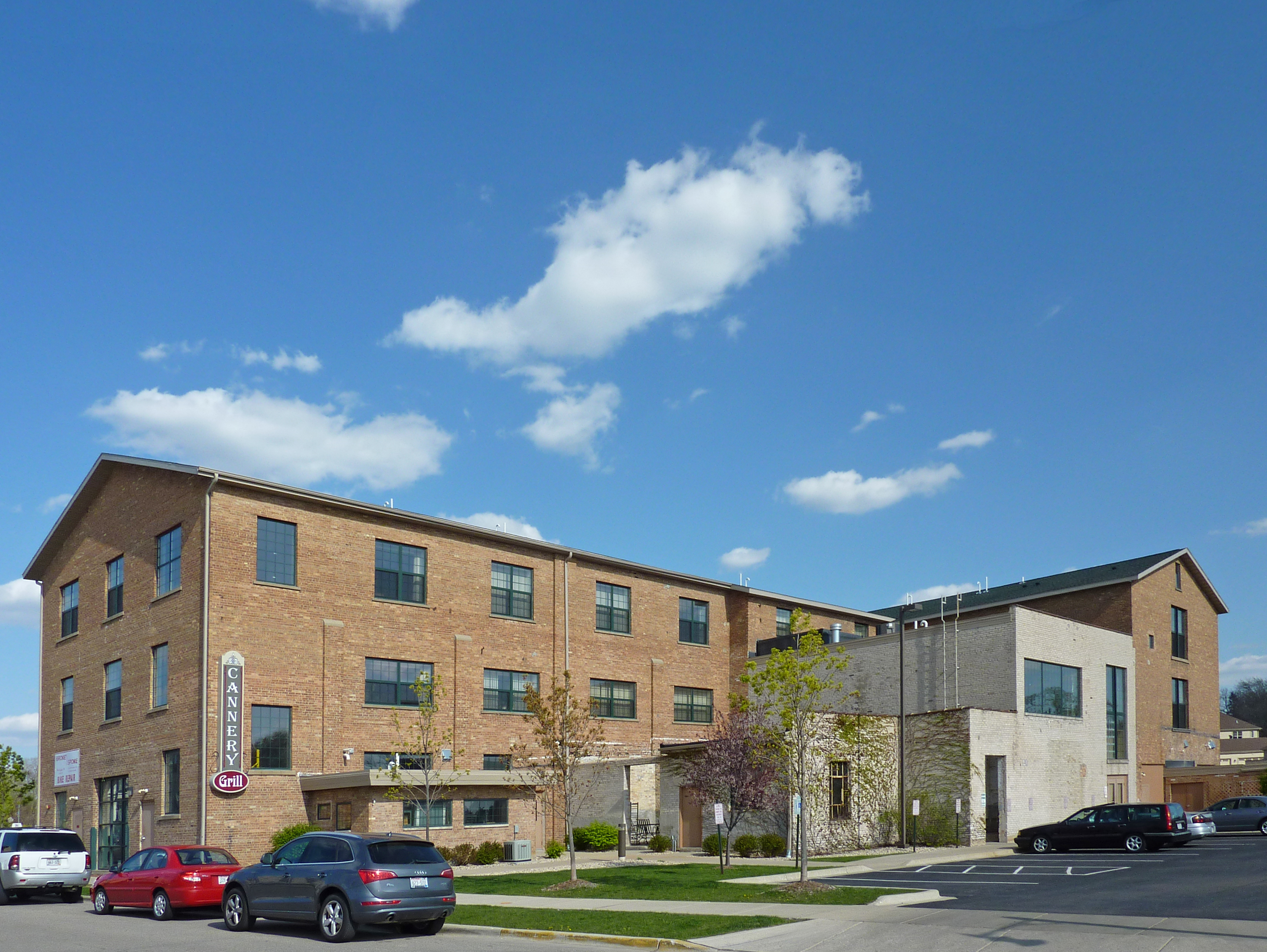

- Location within Wisconsin
- Location: 151 Market St., Sun Prairie, Wisconsin
- Coordinates: 43°10′51″N 89°12′40″W
- Area: 1 acre (0.40 ha)
- Built: 1912
- NRHP reference No.: 04001003
- Added to NRHP: September 15, 2004

The Fuhremann Canning Company Factory is a historic factory building at 151 Market Street in Sun Prairie, Wisconsin. The Fuhremann Canning Company built the original version of the current building in 1912, replacing an earlier factory built by the Sun Prairie Canning Company in 1912. The Oconomowoc Canning Company bought the factory in 1929 and extensively rebuilt it in 1943–44. All of the factory's owners used the building to produce canned vegetables and particularly canned peas, one of Wisconsin's major crops. During World War II, German prisoners of war at Camp McCoy were brought to work at the factory, as the war had caused an agricultural labor shortage despite large pea and corn harvests. The factory continued to produce canned vegetables until 2000; the building is now used for retail and apartments.

The building was added to the National Register of Historic Places on September 15, 2004.
