= Nottingham Cooperative =

- Location within Wisconsin

General information
- Location: Madison, Wisconsin, United States
- Coordinates: 43.078019°N 89.392804°W
- Completed: 1927

Design and construction
- Architect: Clarence E. Shepard

Nottingham Cooperative (or Nottingham as referred to by its residents) is a 21-room housing cooperative located at 146 Langdon St. in Madison, Wisconsin, on the shore of Lake Mendota. Nottingham was incorporated in February, 1971, by a group of lawyers and students from the University of Wisconsin–Madison. The membership is usually composed of a mix of about 20 students and non-students. Unlike eleven other housing cooperatives near the campus area, Nottingham is not part of the Madison Community Cooperative.

The building was built in 1927 in the Mediterranean Revival Style.

Nottingham has hosted musical and dramatic events.

== History ==
The house was originally built in 1927 for the Sigma Phi Epsilon fraternity by Kansas architect Clarence E. Shepard (1869 - 1949). Shepard was an architect of Frank Lloyd Wright's Prairie School in Kansas City, although 146 was built in the Mediterranean Revival Style. At that time, this Spanish style of architecture was popular on the west coast, especially in Hollywood, but rare in the Midwest. Nottingham's tile roof is one of the building's Mediterranean Revival features.

Past owners include the fraternities Sigma Phi Epsilon (1927–1939) and Phi Sigma Delta (1940–1942), an all-girls dormitory called Shoreland House (1943–1951), and the fraternity Pi Lambda Phi (1952–1970). Nottingham celebrated its 50th anniversary as a co-op in 2021.

== Events ==
Over the years Nottingham has hosted many events, usually held in the ballroom. Nottingham collects no money for these shows.

=== Bands that have played at Nottingham ===
- Killdozer (1983)
- Die Kreuzen (1983)
- MDC (1983)
- Tar Babies (1983, 1984)
- Hüsker Dü (1984)
- Stanley Jordan (1984)
- Swamp Thing (1984)
- Bikini Kill (1994)
- Poster Children (1996)
- Perplexions (1998)
- Wolf Eyes (2003)
- Cock ESP (2003, 2004)
- Trad, Gras och Stenar
- Jackie-O Motherfucker
- No-Neck Blues Band
- Costes (2003)
- Eugene Chadbourne (2004)
- Panicsville (2004)
- Nautical Almanac (2005)
- Old Time Relijun (2005)
- Flying Luttenbachers (2006)
- Fuck the Facts (2006)
- Envy (2006)
- Upsilon Acrux (2007)
- Meat Jelly (2019)
- The Hollow Roots (2019)
- De3ra (2019)
- Hogback (2022)
- Commonwealth (2022)
- The Present Age (2022)
- Sex, Fear (2022, 2023)
- Lunar Moth (2022)
- Watermelon Collie (2023)
- Tiny Voices (2023)
- Excuse Me, Who Are You? (2023)
- Flying Fuzz (2023)
- Killed By Kiwis (2023)
- Dad Bods (2023)
- Everything Means Totally Nothing (2023)
- Oister Boy (2023)
- Eat Turf (2023)
- Cause and Control (2023)
- Sheep (2023)
- Boxing Day (2023)
- Carson D. Bell and the Endtimes (2023)
- Boy Clothes (2023)
- Diet Lite (2023)
- Kule (2023)
- SHOOBIE (2023)
- JVK (2024)
- Yolk (2025)

== Notable alumni ==
Stacy Jo Scott
