= WLSP-LP =

Radio station in Sun Prairie, Wisconsin

Sun Prairie, Wisconsin; United States
- Broadcast area: Madison, Wisconsin
- Frequency: 103.5 MHz
- Branding: 103.5 The Sun

Programming
- Format: Variety

Ownership
- Owner: Sun Prairie Community Foundation

History
- First air date: 2015

Technical information
- Licensing authority: FCC
- Facility ID: 193367
- Class: L1
- ERP: 22 watts
- HAAT: 62.6 meters
- Transmitter coordinates: 43°10′30.40″N 89°13′43.90″W

Links
- Public license information: LMS
- Webcast: 103.5 The Sun
- Website: Sun Prairie Media Center

WLSP-LP (103.5 FM) is a community radio station in the city of Sun Prairie, Wisconsin. The station, which went on air in 2015, broadcasts a mix of local programming and music chosen by local DJs.

== See also ==
- List of community radio stations in the United States
