= Sun Prairie, Wisconsin =

City in Wisconsin

- City
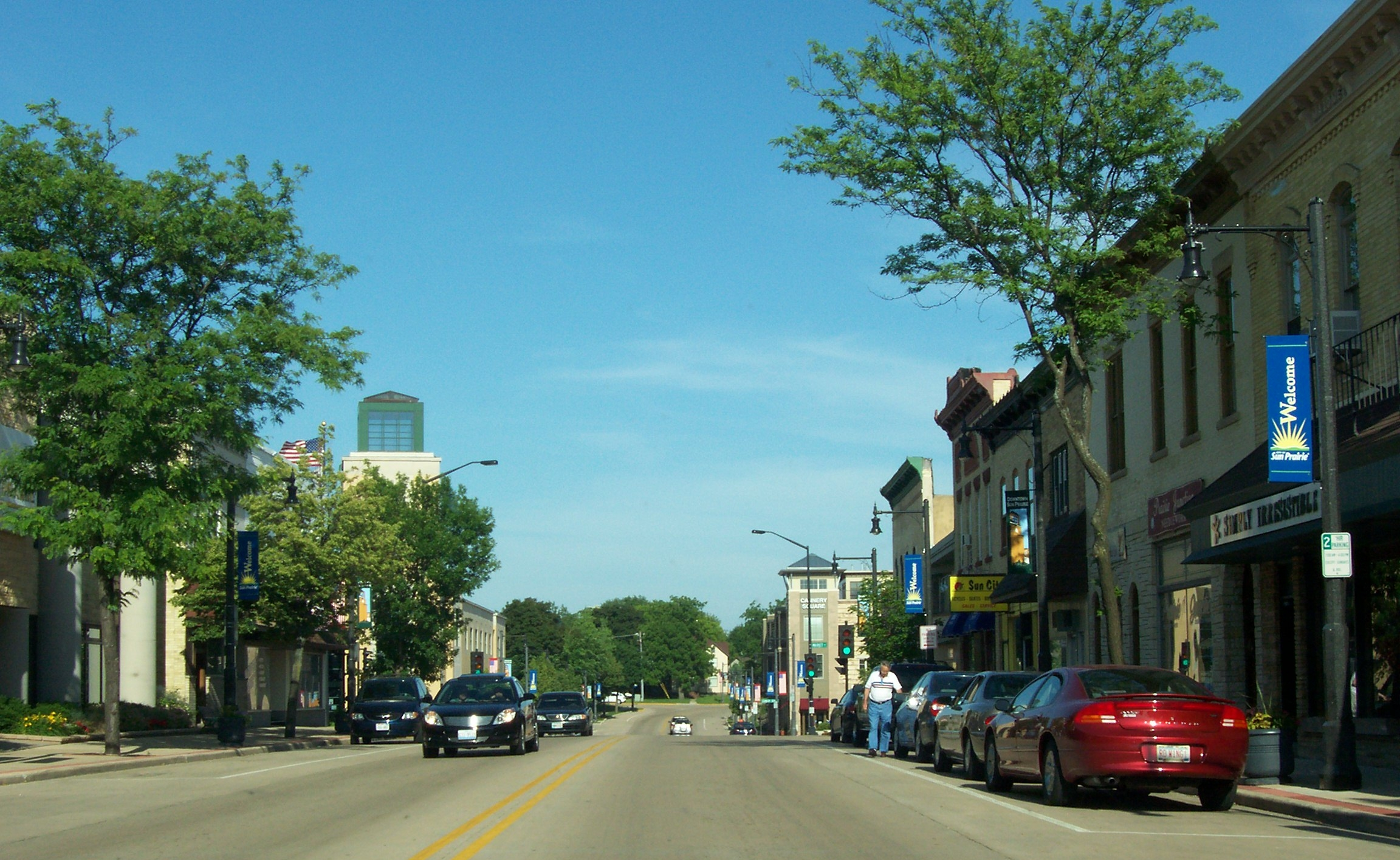
- Downtown Sun Prairie in June 2007

- Logo
- Nickname: Groundhog Capital of the World
- Motto: Revolves Around You
- Interactive map of Sun Prairie, Wisconsin
- Location within Wisconsin Location within the United States
- Coordinates: 43°11′0.97″N 89°13′56.41″W
- Country: United States
- State: Wisconsin
- County: Dane
- Settled: 1839
- Incorporated (city): 1958

Government
  - Type: Mayor-council
  - Mayor: Steve Stocker
  - Municipal judge: Tom Hebl
  - Council president: Maureen Crombie
  - Council members: Alderpersons: District 1; - Casey Drengler; - Rex Owens; District 2; - Bill Baker; - Santiago Rosas; District 3; - Maureen Crombie; - Michael Jacobs; District 4; - Cassi Benedict; - Emily Comstock

Area
  - Total: 12.93 sq mi (33.49 km^{2})
  - Land: 12.91 sq mi (33.44 km^{2})
  - Water: 0.023 sq mi (0.06 km^{2})
- Elevation: 984 ft (300 m)

Population (2020)
  - Total: 35,967
  - Estimate (2026): 40,238
  - Density: 2,685.0/sq mi (1,036.67/km^{2})
- Time zone: UTC−6 (Central Standard Time)
  - Summer (DST): UTC−5 (Central Daylight Time)
- ZIP Code: 53590
- Area code: 608
- FIPS code: 55-78600
- GNIS feature ID: 1584255
- Website: cityofsunprairie.com

Sun Prairie is a city in Dane County, Wisconsin, United States. The population was 35,967 at the 2020 census. It is the most populous suburb of Madison, the state capital, and is part of the Madison metropolitan area.

== History ==
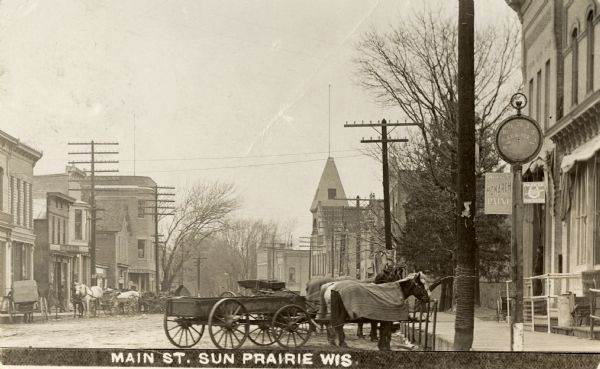
Sun Prairie's Main Street, c. 1900

President Martin Van Buren commissioned a party of 45 men, including Augustus A. Bird, to build a capital for the Territory of Wisconsin in Madison. The group left Milwaukee on May 26, 1837, and traveled for days in the rain. On June 9, the group emerged at the edge of the prairie and with the sun shining for the first time in days, carved the words "Sun Prairie" into a tree. Charles Bird returned to the area two years later and became the first settler.

The Town of Sun Prairie was created on February 2, 1846. The village of Sun Prairie, which grew from that town, was incorporated in an act of the Wisconsin legislature on March 6, 1868.

On March 17, 1958, the Village Board ordered a referendum election on whether Sun Prairie should incorporate as a city of the fourth class after receiving a petition signed by over 100 electors. In the referendum election on May 6, 1958, 295 voted for incorporating as a city and 284 voted against. On May 15, 1958, the Wisconsin Secretary of State filed the certificate of incorporation of the city of Sun Prairie.

On July 10, 2018, a gas explosion leveled a downtown city block, destroying a bar and a pizza restaurant, as well as damaging the historic old city hall building and multiple other nearby buildings. Bar owner and Fire Captain Cory Barr was injured in the explosion and died as a result soon after. Many citizens and businesses around Sun Prairie offered their support to the Barr family and the affected businesses through fundraising campaigns. This tragic event was the origin of the tagline "Sun Prairie Strong", a slogan which signifies the city's strength as it comes together as a community.

== Geography ==
According to the United States Census Bureau, the city has a total area of 12.25 square miles (31.73 km^{2}), of which 12.23 square miles (31.68 km^{2}) is land and 0.02 square miles (0.05 km^{2}) is water. The city of Sun Prairie includes land that once was part of the towns of Bristol, Burke, Sun Prairie, and Windsor. On January 5, 2007, the city of Sun Prairie, city of Madison, village of DeForest, and town of Burke entered into a cooperative plan under which all remaining land in the town of Burke has been designated for attachment into the cities and village.

=== Geology ===
The Yahara River Valley encompasses part of the city of Sun Prairie. This area contains deep glacial deposits created by the Wisconsin Glaciation. The eastern part of Dane County, known as the drumlin and marsh physiographic area, includes most of Sun Prairie. The deposits found in this area include general glacial deposits and marsh deposits, and consist of many small drumlins interspersed with shallow glacial deposits having poorly defined drainage.

The general soils associations in the Sun Prairie area include the Dodge-St. Charles-McHenry, Plano-Ringwood-Griswold, and Batavia-Houghton-Dresden Associations. The Dodge-St. Charles-McHenry soils are found in the eastern, southern, and central portions of Sun Prairie. This association has a varied landscape, which is mostly sloping, with some areas on benches and in depressions. The Dodge, St. Charles and McHenry soils are well drained to moderately well drained. The Sable soils in this association are nearly level and poorly drained. Most of the soils in this association have moderate permeability and a high available water capacity. Most also have slight to moderate limitations for urban uses and farming.

=== Cityscape ===
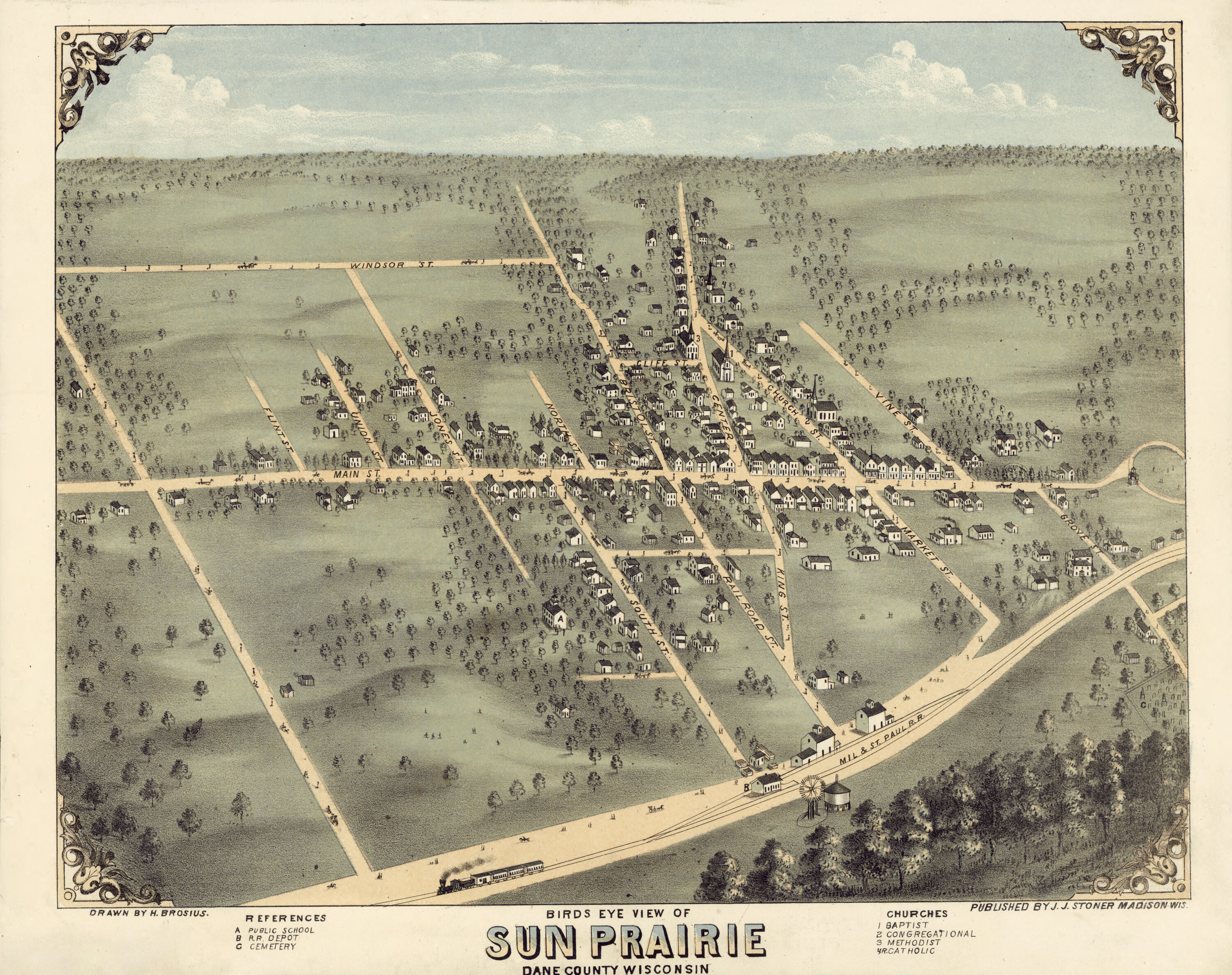
Bird's eye view of Sun Prairie, c. 1875

The landscape of the city consists mostly of gently rolling hills and plains. The elevation of the city averages about 984 feet (300 m) above mean sea level.

Sun Prairie has developed a number of traditional neighborhood developments (TND). Often referred to as "new urbanism", these neighborhoods focus on the pedestrian and the appearance of city streets. While these developments have sought to address the problems and concerns associated with conventional suburban development and urban sprawl, many occupy former farmland and undeveloped rural lands. The city's planners addressed the criticisms that they were "attempting to recreate "pretend" neighborhoods" by noting that the aim of the TND was to borrow those design ideas and features effective in older neighborhoods and adapting them to current needs.

=== Climate ===
Sun Prairie

Climate chart (precipitation, max. and min. temperature)
J	F	M	A	M	J	J	A	S	O	N	D
1.1 25 7	1.1 30 11	2.2 42 23	2.9 57 34	3.1 69 44	3.7 78 54	3.4 82 60	4 80 57	3.4 72 48	2.2 60 38	2.1 44 27	1.8 30 14
- █ Average max. and min. temperatures in °F
- █ Precipitation totals in inches
- Source: Weatherbase
Metric conversion
J	F	M	A	M	J	J	A	S	O	N	D
28 −4 −14	28 −1 −12	56 5 −5	74 14 1	79 21 7	94 26 12	86 28 15	102 26 14	86 22 9	56 16 3	53 7 −3	46 −1 −10
- █ Average max. and min. temperatures in °C
- █ Precipitation totals in mm

In the Köppen climate classification, Sun Prairie is in the warm summer humid continental climate zone (Dfa). Summers tend to be hot and humid. The warmest month of the year is July, with an average maximum temperature of 82.1 °F (27.8 °C) and the coldest month of the year is January, with an average minimum temperature of 9.3 °F (−12.6 °C). Temperature variations between night and day tend to be moderate during summer with an average difference of 21 °F (12 °C), and fairly limited during winter with an average difference of 16 °F (9 °C).

The annual average precipitation at Sun Prairie is 32.95 inches (837 mm). Rainfall is fairly evenly distributed throughout the year, and the wettest month of the year is August with an average rainfall of 4.33 inches (110 mm).

=== Flooding ===
The city of Sun Prairie encounters occasional flooding because of the presence of hydric soils, spring melting and its proximity to the Koshkonong Creek. This condition is compounded by storm water runoff from development and urbanization in the upper reaches of the watershed. Many residents of the city believe that the problems with flooding are worsening, becoming more frequent over the last 14 years.

A flood on April 11, 2008, caused by heavy overnight rains that outpaced the city's storm drain system and leaked into the sewer system, resulted in flooding in residential basements. The city suffered considerably from the June 2008 Midwest floods.

== Demographics ==
Historical population
Census	Pop.	Note	%±
1870	626		—
1880	597		−4.6%
1890	704		17.9%
1900	938		33.2%
1910	1,119		19.3%
1920	1,236		10.5%
1930	1,337		8.2%
1940	1,625		21.5%
1950	2,263		39.3%
1960	4,008		77.1%
1970	9,935		147.9%
1980	12,931		30.2%
1990	15,333		18.6%
2000	20,369		32.8%
2010	29,364		44.2%
2020	35,967		22.5%
2025 (est.)	39,227		9.1%
U.S. Decennial Census

=== 2020 census ===
As of the 2020 census, Sun Prairie had a population of 35,967. The median age was 35.8 years. 25.9% of residents were under the age of 18 and 13.1% of residents were 65 years of age or older. For every 100 females, there were 94.3 males, and for every 100 females age 18 and over there were 90.2 males age 18 and over.

99.8% of residents lived in urban areas, while 0.2% lived in rural areas.

There were 14,376 households in Sun Prairie and 11,682 families in the city. Of all households, 34.8% had children under the age of 18 living in them, 47.9% were married-couple households, 16.4% were households with a male householder and no spouse or partner present, and 27.1% were households with a female householder and no spouse or partner present. About 28.3% of all households were made up of individuals and 9.7% had someone living alone who was 65 years of age or older. The average household size was 2.43 and the average family size was 3.05.

There were 14,952 housing units, of which 3.9% were vacant. The homeowner vacancy rate was 1.0% and the rental vacancy rate was 5.5%.

Racial composition as of the 2020 census
Race	Number	Percent
White	26,926	74.9%
Black or African American	2,663	7.4%
American Indian and Alaska Native	165	0.5%
Asian	2,724	7.6%
Native Hawaiian and Other Pacific Islander	11	0.0%
Some other race	895	2.5%
Two or more races	2,583	7.2%
Hispanic or Latino (of any race)	2,192	6.1%

=== 2010 census ===
As of the census of 2010, there were 29,364 people, 11,636 households, and 7,641 families residing in the city. The population density was 2,401.0 inhabitants per square mile (927.0/km^{2}). There were 12,413 housing units at an average density of 1,015.0 per square mile (391.9/km^{2}). The racial makeup of the city was 85.4% White, 6.1% African American, 0.3% Native American, 3.7% Asian, 1.4% from other races, and 3.0% from two or more races. Hispanic or Latino of any race were 4.3% of the population. There were 11,636 households, of which 37.7% had children under the age of 18 living with them, 50.1% were married couples living together, 11.5% had a female householder with no husband present, 4.1% had a male householder with no wife present, and 34.3% were non-families. 26.1% of all households were made up of individuals, and 7.6% had someone living alone who was 65 years of age or older. The average household size was 2.51 and the average family size was 3.08.

The median age in the city was 33.3 years. 27.9% of residents were under the age of 18; 7.5% were between the ages of 18 and 24; 32.8% were from 25 to 44; 22.9% were from 45 to 64; and 8.9% were 65 years of age or older. The gender makeup of the city was 48.5% male and 51.5% female.

=== 2000 census ===
As of the census of 2000, there were 20,369 people, 7,881 households, and 5,437 families residing in the city. The population density was 2,133.7 people per square mile (823.5/km^{2}). There were 8,198 housing units at an average density of 858.8 per square mile (331.4/km^{2}). The racial makeup of the city was 92.68% White, 3.10% Black or African American, 0.29% Native American, 1.34% Asian, 0.03% Pacific Islander, 0.98% from other races, and 1.58% from two or more races. 2.72% of the population were Hispanic or Latino of any race.

There were 7,881 households, out of which 38.3% had children under the age of 18 living with them, 54.6% were married couples living together, 10.7% had a female householder with no husband present, and 31.0% were non-families. 23.8% of all households were made up of individuals, and 7.4% had someone living alone who was 65 years of age or older. The average household size was 2.56 and the average family size was 3.07.

In the city, the population was spread out, with 28.5% under the age of 18, 8.6% from 18 to 24, 33.7% from 25 to 44, 19.8% from 45 to 64, and 9.3% who were 65 years of age or older. The median age was 33 years. For every 100 females, there were 92.8 males. For every 100 females age 18 and over, there were 89.0 males.

The median income for a household in the city was $51,345, and the median income for a family was $61,197. Males had a median income of $40,510 versus $28,786 for females. The per capita income for the city was $23,277. About 3.8% of families and 4.4% of the population were below the poverty line, including 6.1% of those under age 18 and 5.3% of those age 65 or over.

== Economy ==
QBE Insurance has American operations in Sun Prairie. Other significant employers include the Sun Prairie School District, American Family Insurance, Colony Brands, and Frontier Communications. Many residents commute to jobs in Madison.

== Arts and culture ==
=== Events ===
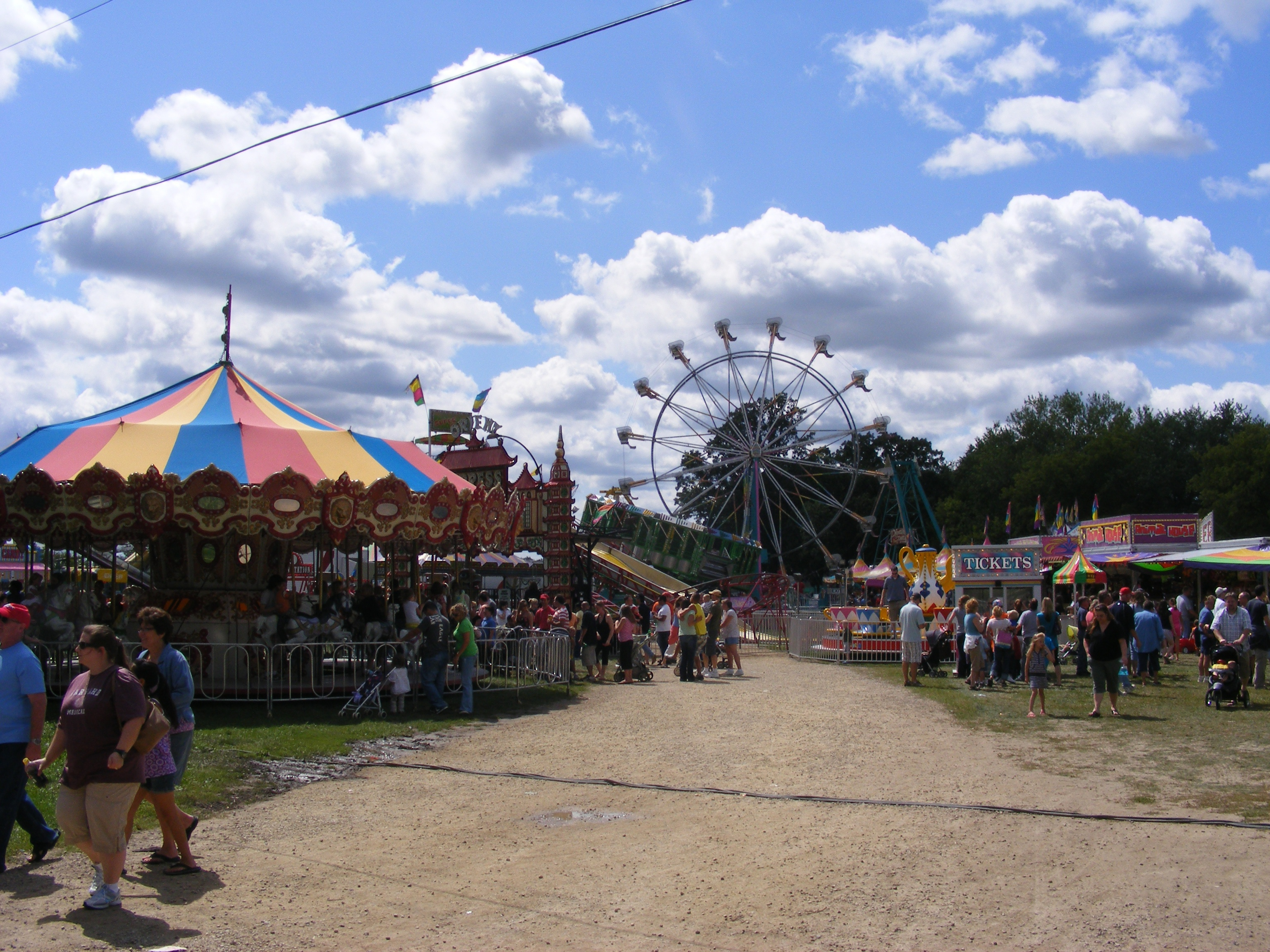
Sun Prairie Sweet Corn Festival

Sun Prairie's Jimmy the Groundhog is the local favorite on Groundhog Day in February. The United States Congressional Record described the city as the "Groundhog Capital of the World" in 1955. During the city's Groundhog Day celebration on February 2, 2015, Jimmy bit Mayor Jonathan Freund's ear. The next day, Freund issued a proclamation that pardoned and absolved Jimmy "of any perceived wrongdoing and charges" under the city's ordinances. Two weeks later, Freund came in last of three candidates in the city's mayoral primary election. Following the biting incident, the United States Department of Agriculture and the Wisconsin Department of Natural Resources declared that capturing wild animals for exhibit was against the law. Sun Prairie's next Groundhog Day celebration on February 2, 2016, featured a caged groundhog purchased for $1,200.

In mid-June, the city holds a local Taste of the Arts fair, in conjunction with the Georgia O'Keeffe Celebration. Artwork is exhibited and instructional classes for arts and crafts are held. A Georgia O'Keeffe recreation discussion is held.

The Flags of Freedom Field Show is a day-long series of events in July, involving high-school marching band competitions with bands from throughout the United States and Canada. It is hosted by the Sound of Sun Prairie.

In mid-August of each year, Sun Prairie hosts a Sweet Corn Festival. Over 70 short tons of sweet corn are served or sold during the weekend event, which includes a carnival, a parade down Main Street and performances by local and regional musical groups.

=== Points of interest ===
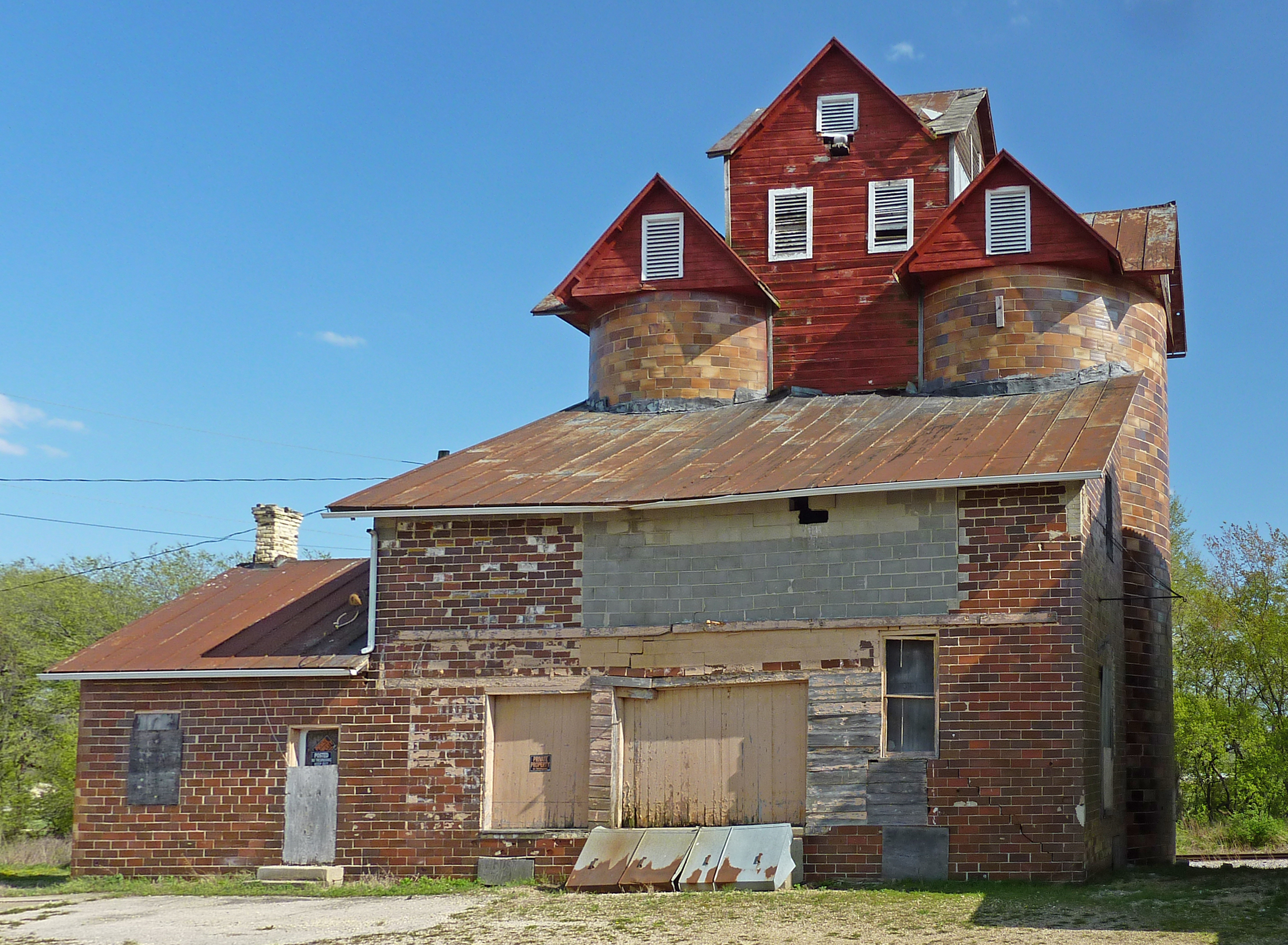
Chase Grain Elevator, built in 1922, is the last known tile elevator remaining in Wisconsin.

Six sites in Sun Prairie are listed in the National Register of Historic Places: the Sun Prairie Downtown Historic District (which includes the Old City Hall), Dr. Charles G. Crosse House, the Chase Grain Elevator, Fuhremann Canning Company Factory, the Adam and Mary Smith House, and the Sun Prairie Water Tower. The Crosse House was built in 1864 by a locally prominent physician and city leader. The Fuhremann Canning Company Factory, in use from 1900 to 1974, now is used as a restaurant space for The Nitty Gritty Restaurant. The Adam and Mary Smith House was constructed in 1879 by Adam Smith, who had come to Wisconsin to do shingle work on the Wisconsin State Capitol. The Sun Prairie Water Tower, located at the junction of Columbus, Church and Cliff Streets, was designed by Frank Stegerwald and constructed in 1912 of stone, metal, and wood.

Other points of interest include:

- The National Midget Auto Racing Hall of Fame at Angell Park Speedway
- Sun Prairie Historical Library and Museum

The Sun Prairie Public Library's service area includes the city of Sun Prairie, the Town of Sun Prairie, the Town of Bristol, and other area communities. It is part of the South Central Library System. Services include youth programming, adult programming, reference, database, technical services, and circulation.

The Sun Prairie Family Aquatic Center is a municipal swimming pool that serves the Sun Prairie area. Opened on May 30, 1992, it replaced the previous municipal pool that opened in 1958 in Angell Park. The Family Aquatic Center has an 18-foot drop slide, two diving boards, eight competition lanes, and a 210-foot water slide. There are play structures and sand volleyball courts inside the pool compound. The Sun Prairie Piranhas, the city's youth swim team, practice at the Family Aquatic Center. They are a member of the Tri-County Swimming Conference.

== Government & Politics ==
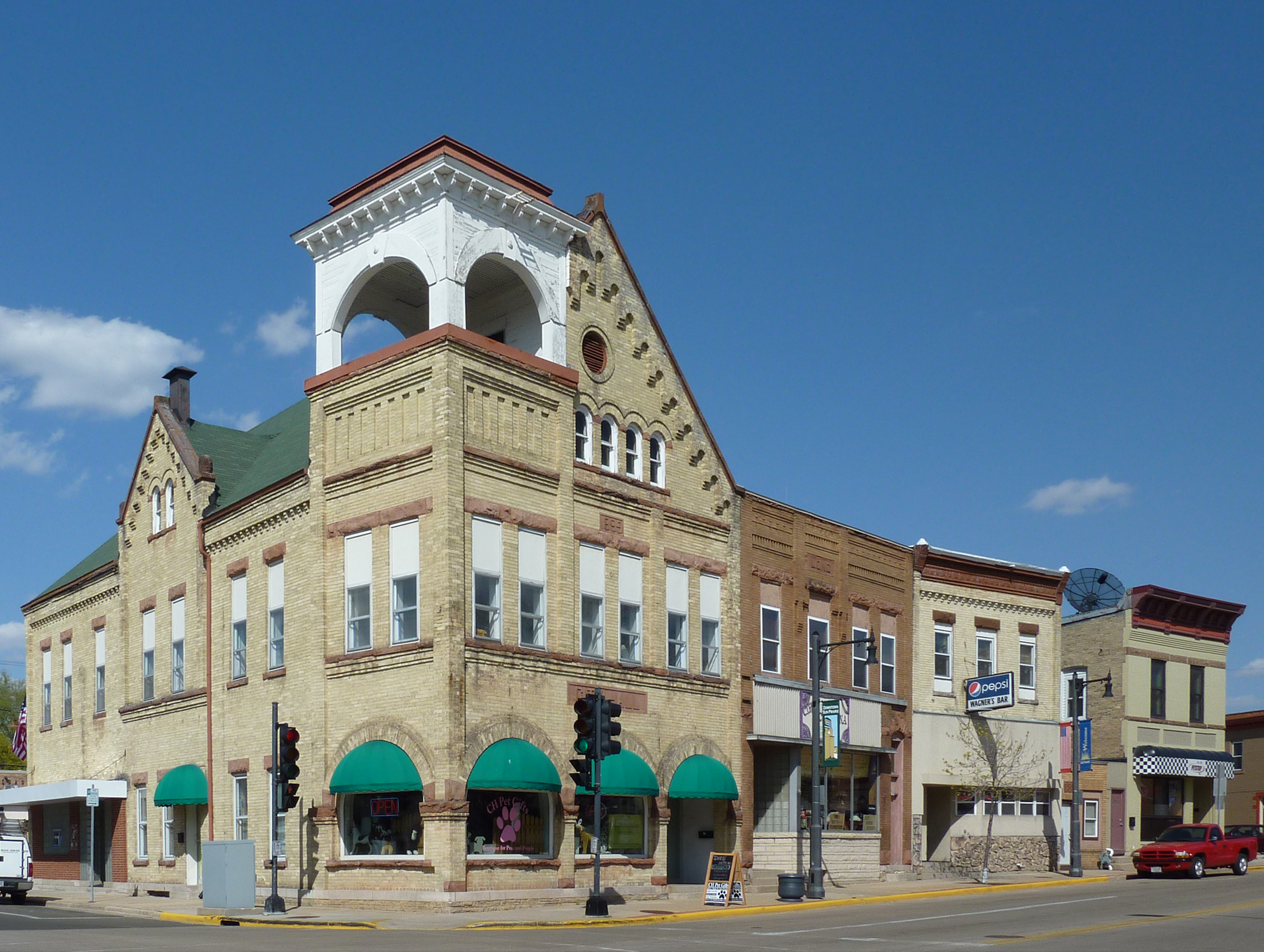
Old City Hall in downtown Sun Prairie, built in 1899

Sun Prairie has a mayor–council form of government. The mayor is elected at large every odd-numbered year. Steve Stocker, previously an alderman, was elected mayor on April 1, 2025, after running unopposed.

The city council consists of eight alderpersons, who along with the mayor, make up the common council. There are four aldermanic districts, with two alderpersons per district, each serving for two-year terms over alternating years. The council manages the city's budget and financial operations as well as determines the salaries of all officers and employees of the city.

Sun Prairie has a full-time city administrator, who is responsible for the administration of the city government in accordance with the policies established by the common council. Other city officers consist of director of administrative services, city attorney, city engineer, city clerk, assessor, municipal judge, police chief and fire chief.

Representative Melissa Ratcliff and Senator Melissa Agard represent the city of Sun Prairie in the Wisconsin State Legislature. At the federal level, the city is represented by Ron Johnson (R) and Tammy Baldwin (D) in the U.S. Senate and Mark Pocan (D) in the House of Representatives.

=== Mayors ===
Mayor	Tenure
Joe Hanley	1958–1960
Anton J. Thomas	1961–1964
Clarence Severson	1965–1968
Theodore W. Chase	1969–1973
Robert Schaben	1974–1980
Donald Foulke	1981–1987
Paul Esser	1987–1990
JoAnn Orfan	1990–2003
Dave Hanneman	2003–2005
Joe Chase	2005–2011
John Murray	2011–2014
Jonathan Freund	2014–2015
Paul Esser	2015–2025
Steve Stocker	2025–

=== Presidential Election Results ===
==== 2000–present ====
United States presidential election results for the City of Sun Prairie, Wisconsin
Year	Republican		Democratic		Third party(ies)	
Year	No.	%	No.	%	No.	%
2000	4,456	44.16%	5,318	52.71%	316	3.13%
2004	6,217	45.85%	7,230	53.32%	112	0.83%
2008	5,093	34.46%	9,502	64.29%	185	1.25%
2012	5,824	36.07%	10,143	62.82%	179	1.11%
2016	5,153	30.90%	10,281	61.65%	1,242	7.45%
2020	5,835	28.62%	14,158	69.44%	397	1.95%
2024	6,198	27.97%	15,581	70.31%	383	1.73%

==== 1960–1996 ====
United States presidential election votes for major party candidates in the City of Sun Prairie, Wisconsin
Year	Republican	Democratic
1996	3,061	3,928
1992	3,125	3,271
1988	3,293	2,999
1984	3,296	2,419
1980	2,521	2,443
1976	2,484	2,474
1972	2,145	1,874
1968	1,305	1,523
1964	625	1,744
1960	728	1,176

== Education ==
The Sun Prairie Area School District administers local public education. The system, which as of the 2018–19 school year enrolled 8,500 students, consists of 9 elementary schools, 3 middle schools, 2 high schools, and an alternative learning high school.

There are two parochial schools in Sun Prairie. Founded in 1892, Sacred Hearts School is a Catholic school serving children of pre-kindergarten through 8th grade. Peace Evangelical Lutheran School is a Pre-K through 8th grade school of the Wisconsin Evangelical Lutheran Synod. Calvary Baptist, which had an enrollment of 25 students, closed effective June 30, 2008.

== Media ==
The Sun Prairie Media Center (a department of the city) has had at least two local public-access television cable TV stations, KSUN (originally KSUN-12) and KIDS-4, for over 30 years. In 2023, the Media Center split KSUN into 2 stations, KSUN Now and KSUN Life. KSUN Now is primarily used for government programming, while KSUN Life is used for community programming. High school sports games are the exception to this, airing on either channel depending on circumstance. KIDS-4's programming content, camera, sound, lighting, editing, writing, and direction are produced by 30 to 40 children selected each year, one of the projects that have been created within this space is a series based on the events of the COVID-19 pandemic named simply 2020 the Movie and has 2 sequels and a prequel along with it. Historically, these children have ranged in age from nine to fourteen, but in 2000, the first high school-aged crew was introduced.

In July 2015, WLSP-LP (103.5), also run by the Sun Prairie Media Center, came to the air as a community radio station.

The city is served by two local newspapers: the Sun Prairie Star (formerly the Star Countryman), and the Hometown Advertiser. Also available is the Wisconsin State Journal, a Madison regional newspaper.

Radio and television are available over the air and on cable/satellite from Madison.

== Transportation ==
=== Roadways ===
- I-39 runs concurrently with I-90 from Illinois to Portage. In Madison, they are joined by I-94 until Portage. This overlap occurs in the area immediately between the metropolitan city of Madison and Sun Prairie.
- I-90 runs east–west through the western, central and southern portions of the state, and is located to the west of Sun Prairie. A total of 187 miles (301 km) of Interstate 90 lie in Wisconsin; the Madison exit (designated 135B) leads to US 151 North and Sun Prairie.
- I-94 as it occurs in Wisconsin runs east–west through the western, central and southeastern portions of the state. The junction of I-90 and I-94 occurs roughly six miles to the southwest of Sun Prairie heading eastward toward Milwaukee at what is commonly known as the "Badger Interchange" where the three interstates (I-39, I-90 and I-94) meet at the eastern terminus of WIS 30.
- U.S. Route 151 (normally called U.S. Highway 151, 151 or US-151) is a freeway in Sun Prairie that runs northeast–southwest across the eastern to southwest portions of the state. Sun Prairie is divided lengthwise by US-151, southwest to northeast, having four different access points: Windsor Street, Reiner Road/Grand Ave., Main Street and Bristol Street.
- Wisconsin Highway 19 (often called Highway 19, STH 19 or WIS 19) is a state highway which passes around the north side of Madison and crosses US-151 as it passes through Sun Prairie. It serves as a local connector route that links via various interchanges the communities of Sun Prairie, Watertown and Waunakee. The roadway follows two-lane surface road for the entire length with the exception of urban multilane arterials.

Prior to 1947, WIS 19 followed the current route of US-18 between Bridgeport and Madison. The route then passed through downtown Madison and followed then WIS 31 (part of the current US-151) to Sun Prairie. East of Sun Prairie the route followed its present-day alignment to Watertown. The route then followed present-day WIS 16 to Waukesha and east from there along present-day WIS 59 into Milwaukee. When the U.S. Highway system was implemented, WIS 19's western terminus was relocated to Madison. The portion between Madison and Sun Prairie remained despite the debut of US-151 as did the eastern portion that became concurrent with US-16. In 1947, the eastern terminus was moved to Watertown, the section along US-151 was removed, and the portion between Mazomanie and Sun Prairie was implemented.

The part of WIS 19 roughly from those interstates west to WIS 113 had at one time been on the corridor of a planned beltline route around the north side of Madison.

Sun Prairie is bordered by the following county roads:

- C (also named N. Grand Avenue) runs north–south and borders Sun Prairie to the west and is crossed by interchange by US-151.
- N (also named N. Bristol Street) runs north–south and bisects a third of the city to the west and is crossed by interchange by US-151.
- VV (also named Twin Lane Road) runs north–south and borders the city to the east and is crossed by interchange by US-151.
- Vinburn Road, which borders the city to the north, runs west toward DeForest and east toward Columbus.

=== Bus service ===
Sun Prairie contracts with Madison Metro Transit to provide two local service bus routes in Sun Prairie, and additional service into Madison. In 2024, Madison is planned to begin regional bus rapid transit service from Sun Prairie through Madison.

=== Railroads ===
Sun Prairie has tracks for freight trains to the south of the city.

== Public services ==
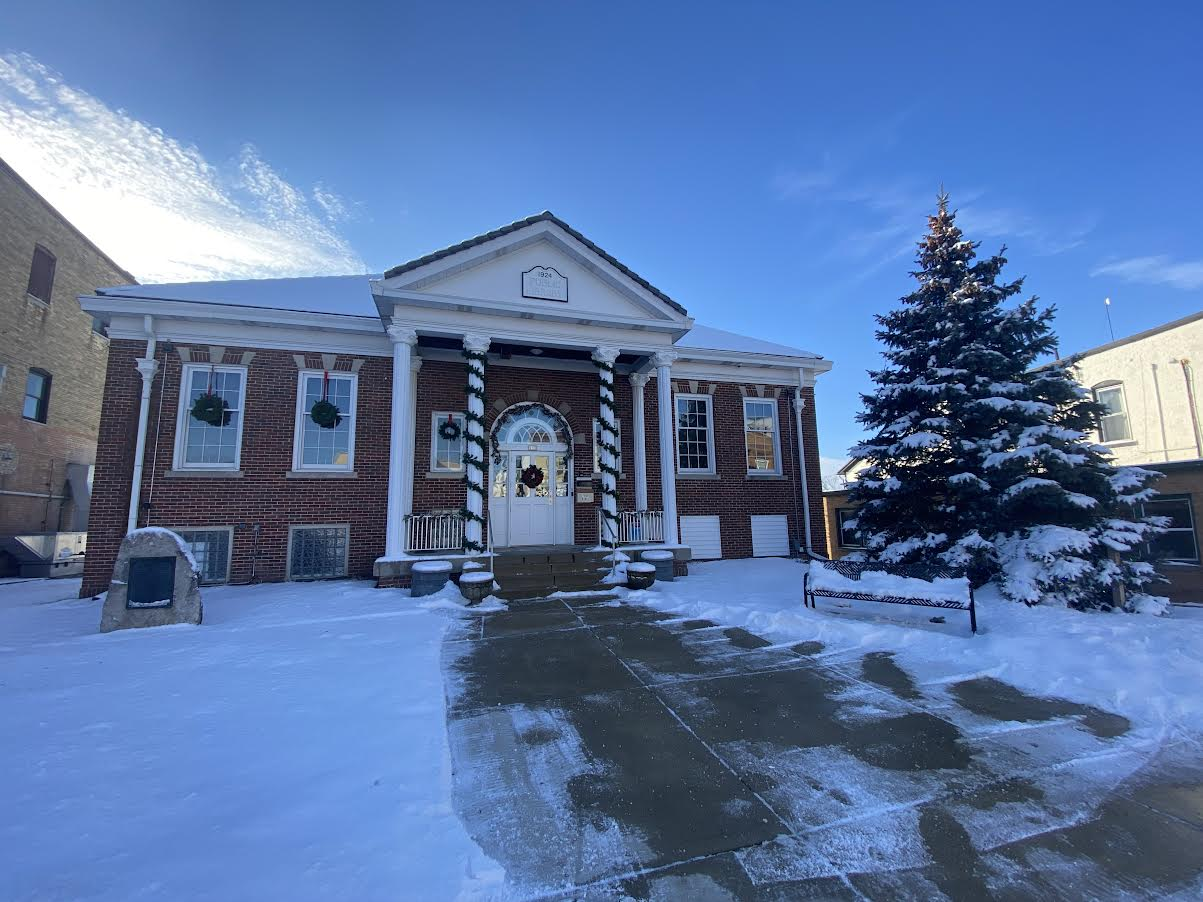
Sun Prairie Historical Museum

=== Fire department ===
Sun Prairie has a combination fire department that serves both the city and town of Sun Prairie, as well as the town of Bristol. The department, which began in 1891, became a City department in 2024 to serve the needs of the growing community. The Town of Burke exited a 100+ year partnership at that time. The fire department has 12 fire apparatus vehicles, and two vintage vehicles, a 1927 Stoughton fire engine refurbished by a past fire department chief and a second 1927 Stoughton fire engine that was Sun Prairie's first motorized fire truck.

=== Emergency medical services ===
Sun Prairie maintains its own emergency medical service, which is a charter member of Dane County's Mutual Aid Box Alarm System (MABAS). Responding to over 3,200 calls in 2020, the department addresses medical and rescue calls in the city of Sun Prairie, village of Marshall, and the towns of Bristol, Medina, Sun Prairie and York. In a district covering 147 square miles (380 km^{2}) with a population of nearly 50,000.

The EMS was founded in October 1977 as an extension of the local police department. The city's rapid growth affected ambulance response times negatively, and the 1980s saw the hiring of a full-time EMS director. In the 1980s and 1990s, most of the service was slowly replaced by full-time EMTs. In the 1990s, the service made a transition from EMT-basic personnel to that of intravenous technician levels and paramedic level.

Sun Prairie EMS transports to all Madison hospitals and to Columbus Community Hospital in Columbus. In 2009 St. Mary's Hospital of Madison opened a free-standing emergency room facility in Sun Prairie. It was demolished in 2024 to make way for a new outpatient facility on the same site.

=== Utilities ===
Sun Prairie Utilities, a municipal not-for-profit, locally owned municipal electric and water utility was founded in 1910. SPU is a member of Wisconsin Public Power, Inc (WPPI), from whom it purchases electricity. Natural gas is supplied to the city by WE-Energies, headquartered in Milwaukee, Wisconsin. Sun Prairie's water is supplied from six wells pumped into the system or stored in the three water towers, which maintain a storage capacity of 2.85 million US gallons (10,800 m^{3}). The city owns and operates it own waste water treatment facility.

== Notable people ==
- Jerome L. Blaska, Wisconsin state representative
- Will Butcher, 2017 Hobey Baker Award winner
- Willard H. Chandler, Wisconsin state senator
- Charles G. Crosse, physician and politician
- Paige Davis, actress best known as a host of reality television series Trading Spaces
- Nathan Haseleu, NASCAR driver
- Gary Hebl, Wisconsin state representative
- Robert Kastenmeier, congressman who lived in Sun Prairie while in office
- Todd Kluever, former NASCAR driver and 2005 NASCAR Craftsman Truck Series Rookie of the Year
- John A. List, University of Chicago economist, pioneer in charity research
- Georgia O'Keeffe, artist, winner of Presidential Medal of Freedom and National Medal of Arts
- Irvin E. Rockwell, Idaho state senator
- Ellen Clara Sabin, educator
- Casey Scheuerell, musician
- Stacy Jo Scott, artist, teacher, curator and writer
- Andy Thompson, former MLB player for the Toronto Blue Jays
