= Lake Delton =

Lake Delton may refer to:

- Lake Delton, Wisconsin, a city in Sauk County, Wisconsin
- Lake Delton (Wisconsin), a lake in Sauk County, Wisconsin
