= Tommy Bartlett =

American entertainer (1914–1998)

Thomson "Tommy" Bartlett (July 11, 1914 – September 6, 1998) was an American showman and entertainment mogul from Wisconsin. He is most often associated with the water skiing thrill show based in Wisconsin Dells, Wisconsin, known as Tommy Bartlett's Thrill Show. The success of this and other traveling water ski shows led to Bartlett's induction into the Water Ski Hall of Fame in 1993. His shows have toured the United States, the Far East, and four World Fairs, and have been seen by 50 million spectators.

== Early career ==
Born in Milwaukee, Wisconsin, Bartlett began his career in entertainment by becoming a broadcaster at radio station WISN at the young age of 13. After moving to Chicago, Illinois, he became a staff announcer at the CBS-owned WBBM radio station. He continued here until the outbreak of World War II, when he learned to fly and subsequently became a flight instructor for the United States Army Air Corps. In 1945, he returned to radio, hosting a show called Meet Tommy Bartlett. In 1947, he hosted the Tommy Bartlett Show and Welcome Travelers.

During his WBBM tenure, Bartlett was popular as host of two transcribed daily shows catering to housewives, Meet the Missus and The Missus Goes to Market. Both shows would become the top-rated local daytime radio shows in the Chicago market, and were sponsored by Fitzpatrick Brothers, manufacturers of Kitchen Klenzer, Big Jack Soap and Automatic Soap Flakes.

== Water skiing ==
In 1949, Bartlett went to the Chicago Railroad Fair, where he witnessed a water skiing show on the Chicago lakefront. After seeing several more such shows over the course of the fair, Bartlett decided to create and produce his own traveling water ski show using surplus equipment that he bought from the performers. The "Tommy Bartlett Water Ski & Jumping Boat Thrill Show", as it was first called, was highly successful. In 1953, after the show called at Wisconsin Dells, Wisconsin, Bartlett was asked by the local Chamber of Commerce to keep the show in the city permanently. Bartlett agreed to the request, keeping one arm of the show at Wisconsin Dells for daily performances on Lake Delton, while four additional road groups continued touring in cities across the United States. The success of the shows led the United Service Organizations (USO) to ask Bartlett to send the show overseas to entertain U.S. soldiers in the Far East, launching a branch of the tour in Asia. Bartlett had a long-term partnership with motor manufacturer Mercury Marine's owner Carl Kiekhaefer.

Through his show, Bartlett has been credited both with popularizing water skiing from a smalltime hobby to a major sport, and with the establishment of Wisconsin Dells as a tourist mecca. He is credited with introducing colorful costumes, and establishing themes for "dancing water", jumping boats, night shows, Polynesian dancers, show ski jumping, and skydivers. Bartlett's Wisconsin Dells show offered bumper stickers for its visitors to put on their cars, thus becoming advertisements for the show and the city across the nation, especially so in the Chicago metropolitan area. In addition to his water ski show, Bartlett invested in other tourist attractions in Wisconsin Dells, building "Tommy Bartlett's Robot World", a hands-on science museum, in the 1970s. The attraction is now known as the Tommy Bartlett Exploratory.

Bartlett also continued his career in broadcasting while both his ski show and Wisconsin Dells ventures were ongoing. He was an announcer at the Calgary Stampede from 1966 to 1992, as well as at the 1988 Winter Olympics. Bartlett's widespread ventures in the entertainment industry led him to become very wealthy. In 1997, Bartlett purchased one of three spare core modules for the space station Mir from a Moscow museum. The object is now the centerpiece of the Tommy Bartlett Exploratory in Wisconsin Dells. It was used as a backdrop by CNN while the network reported on Mir's re-entry to the atmosphere in 2001.

Bartlett was inducted into the Water Ski Hall of Fame in 1993 for his contributions to promoting the sport, despite having only water skied once in his life, on his seventieth birthday in 1984. He was elected to the Wisconsin Athletic Hall of Fame in 2003.

== Death ==
On September 6, 1998, Bartlett died of kidney failure at the age of 84 at a hospital in Madison, Wisconsin. His name, however, lives on in the Tommy Bartlett Exploratory, which continues to entertain thousands of visitors every year.
