= EWP =

EWP may refer to

- East West Players
- Elevated work platform
- Elliott wave principle
- Emergency Watershed Program
- Engineered wood products
- England and Wales Precipitation, a set of monthly records dating back to the eighteenth century
- European Wrestling Promotion, a German/Austrian wrestling promotion, successor to the Catch Wrestling Association
