= Tommy Bartlett Exploratory =

Attraction in Wisconsin Dells, Wisconsin

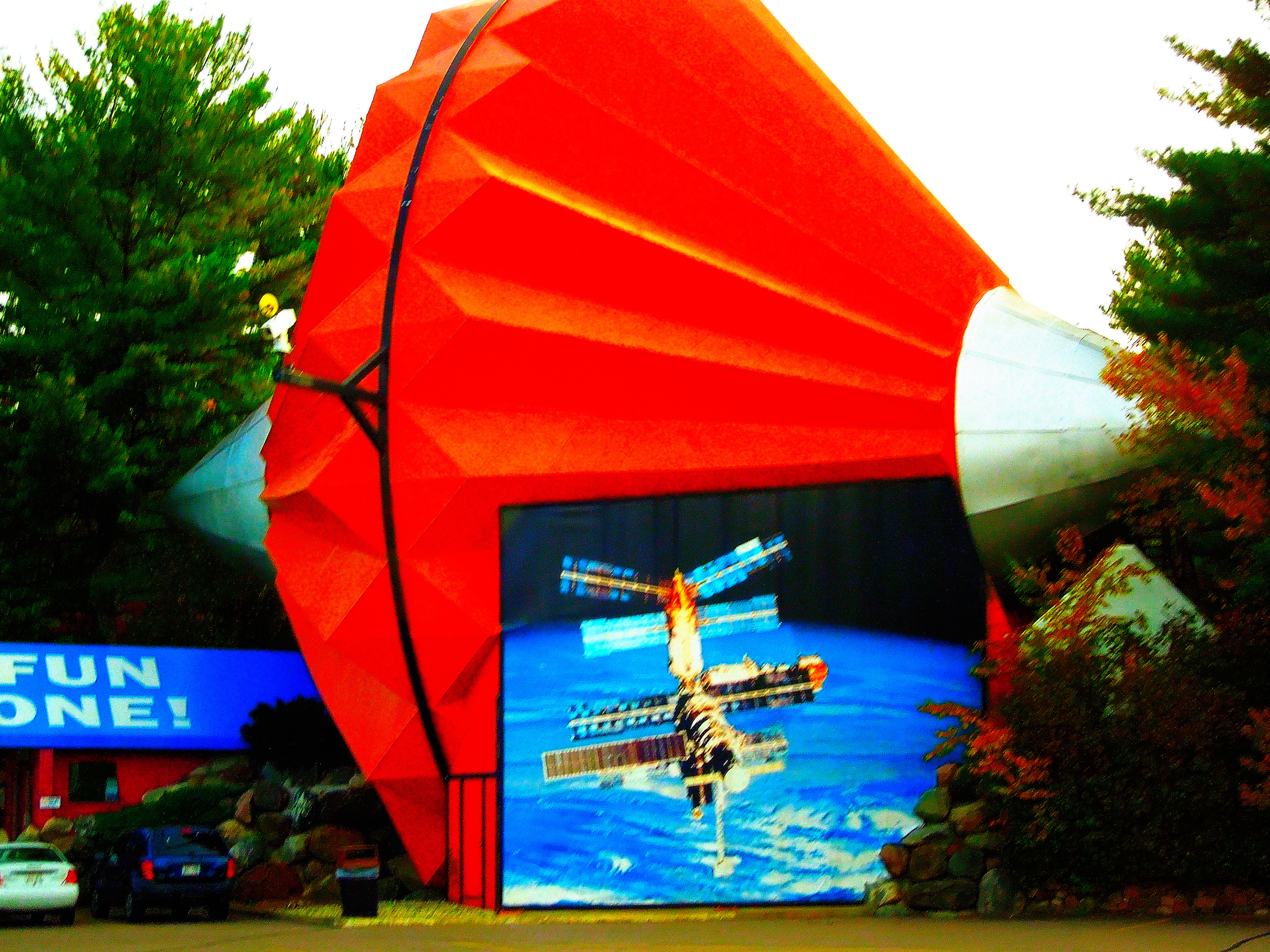

The Tommy Bartlett Exploratory is an attraction in Wisconsin Dells, Wisconsin with over 150 interactive science displays. It was the sister attraction to the long-running Tommy Bartlett's Thrill Show before it closed in 2020. When it opened in 1982, it was called Tommy Bartlett's Robot World & Exploratory, but many of the robot displays have since been eliminated.

In 1996, Bartlett bid on and purchased one of Russia's spare Mir Space Station core modules. This space station is on display at the Exploratory.

The sale of both the Tommy Bartlett’s Thrill Show as well as the Tommy Bartlett Exploratory concluded on May 5, 2025. The buyer, Ripley’s Believe It or Not!, intends to keep both the waterfront show and the science museum open for tourist activity.
