= Camp Chi =

Jewish summer camp in Wisconsin, US

Coordinates: 43.594589°N 89.805465°W

Camp Chi is a Jewish summer camp in Lake Delton, Wisconsin. Chi caters mainly to Jewish children, grades 3 to 11.

== History ==
Chi was founded in 1921 as the Chicago Hebrew Institute by the Jewish Community Centers of Chicago. In the 1940s and beyond, the camp was supported by fundraising efforts by the Jewish Auxiliary and the Institute Woman's Club via luncheons.

In the 1950s, the camp had a summer population of 1500 children between the ages of 5 and 16, and it provided for free summer events and trips to Jewish elderly. It moved to its present site in Lake Delton, Wisconsin in 1957 and became a co-ed camp. The 600 acre facility features summer cabins, two pools, tennis courts, a horseback riding stable, athletic fields, a large winterized gymnasium facility, a year-round conference center and miles of magnificent trails. Kyle Kolling became director of Camp Chi in 2023, after 23 summers with the camp.

== Villages ==
Camp Chi is divided by grade into the following groups:

- Garinim (two-week 3rd grade)
- Yeladim (two-week 4th and 5th grade)
- Shoreshim (4th and 5th grade)
- Tsofim (6th grade)
- Kadima (two-week 6th and 7th grade)
- Chalutzim (7th grade)
- Habonim (8th grade)
- PNW (Pacific Northwest Trip) (9th and 10th Grade)
- Noar (9th and 10th grade)
- SIT (Staff In Training) (8 weeks) (11th grade)
- Avodah (Ages 18–22 for people with developmental or physical disabilities)
- Take Two (Two weekers that can extend to 3 or 4 weeks if they want to during the session) (For Shoreshim, Tsofim, Chalutzim, Habonim, Noar, Avodah)

== Keshet and Avodah ==
Keshet, a program for children with developmental or physical disabilities, began in 2009. Avodah, a work program for special needs adults, began in 2012.
