= Wilderness Territory =

Water park resort in Wisconsin Dells, US

Wilderness Hotel & Golf Resort
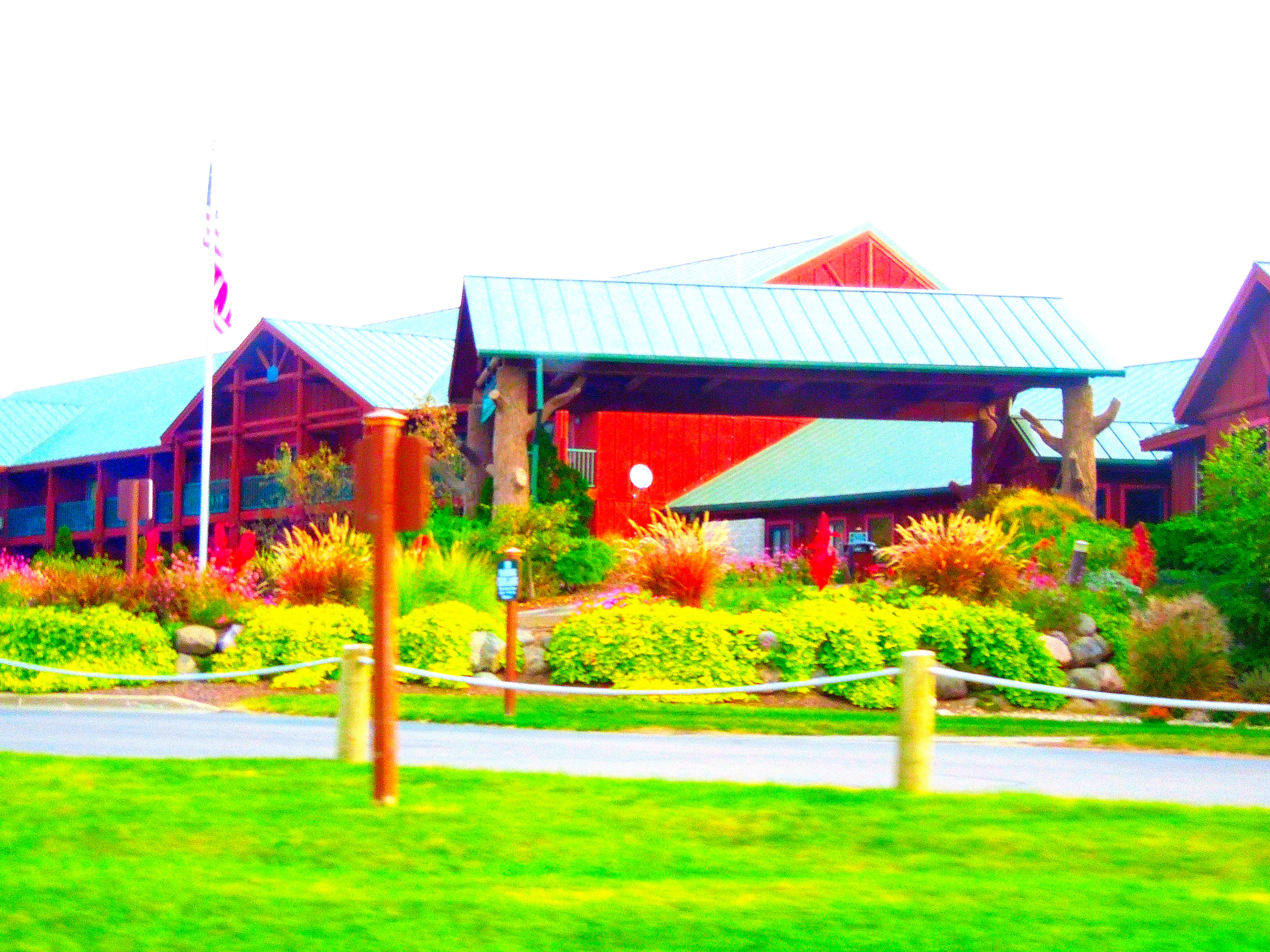
- Former names: Wilderness Territory

General information
- Location: Lake Delton, Wisconsin
- Coordinates: 43.58655°N 89.78294°W
- Opened: 1995
- Owner: Helland and Lucke families

Other information
- Number of rooms: 1,163

Website
- https://www.wildernessresort.com/

Wilderness Hotel & Golf Resort is a large water resort in Lake Delton, Wisconsin. It is a combined size of 240,000 square feet (22,000 m^{2}), and is part of a chain of two resorts, the newer and smaller one being Wilderness at the Smokies in Tennessee. The chain also includes four small outdoor waterparks.

== Timeline ==
Wilderness Hotel & Golf Resort is owned and operated by the Helland and Lucke families, and the grandsons of the original founder. Tom Lucke, co-owner of Wilderness Hotel & Golf Resort; Peter Helland Jr., co-owner and vice president; Tim Lucke, co-owner and project manager; and Pat Helland, co-owner and director of development. Their late grandfather, Oliver “O.P.” Helland, was the founder of the Riverview Boat Line back in 1921. He is known as one of the first local river men to arrange boat touring for the purpose of sightseeing along the Wisconsin River.

O.P. Helland, well known during his time as a civic rights activist and entrepreneur, aided in evolving the area into what is now considered one of the premier tourist destinations of the Midwestern United States; he would prove to make history by changing the face of the local economy in The Dells.

A short time after Riverview Boat Line was founded, O.P. Helland began the process of developing a restaurant and series of retail shops using the income that he earned from tourists. He had purchased adjacent land along the river and among these bustling properties included Hotel Helland; a hotel located directly across the street from the local train station. Building a hotel in this specific location proved to be an excellent decision; the busy area proved to provide steady business as the hotel would accommodate a flurry of business travelers and vacationers.

In 1952, operations of the company were taken over by Peter Helland Sr, attorney Hans Helland, and Virginia Helland Lucke; three children of O.P Helland. They are the direct predecessors of the current owner-operators of the resort; Pat Helland and Peter Helland Jr. are the sons of Peter Sr., Tim and Tom Lucke are the sons of Virginia, and Hans is their uncle. Virginia served as the head of the retail department of the company, while her brother Peter Sr. took the greater task of overseeing daily management of the company.

At the age of 28, Tom Lucke acquired a motel property called The Riviera. This would prove to be his first descent into a local hotel industry that he would improve in regard to the combination of indoor and outdoor water park properties with quality lodging accommodations.

In 1995, the 443-unit Wilderness Hotel & Golf Resort opened its doors. It is Tom Lucke’s fifth and most heavily themed resort in The Dells tourist region. Tom also developed the tropical themed Polynesian Hotel, the Atlantis, the Bahama Bay, and the Caribbean Club resorts.

In 1995, the Wilderness Hotel and Golf Resort opened for business along U.S. Highway 12 (Wisconsin Dells Parkway) with a 35,000-square-foot (3,300 m^{2}) water park named Fort Wilderness. In 1999, the hotel added its second indoor waterpark, Klondike Kavern, and an additional sixty guest rooms.

In 2002, the resort opened the Wild West region of the hotel which has 162 guest rooms. It also includes Dodge ‘Em City, a 30,000-square-foot (2,800 m^{2}) indoor play park featuring Timberland Playhouse and Lake Wilderness outdoor waterpark. In 2003, the Wild West Waterpark opened for business.

In 2003, a 108-condominium, upscale resort, called Wilderness on the Lake, opened for business. It is home to Cubby's Cove, a 35,000-square-foot (3,300 m^{2}) indoor/outdoor waterpark complete with an Infinity pool overlooking Lake Delton.

In the summer of 2005, to mark the resort's 10th anniversary, the Wilderness Hotel & Golf Resort opened two thrill rides, the Hurricane and Black Hole waterslides.

In April 2006, the Wilderness opened its largest indoor waterpark yet, the Wild WaterDome. This 70,000-square-foot (6,500 m^{2}) waterpark is home to a large indoor wave pool, the Dueling Mammoths family raft ride, and a toddler play 'n spray area. The waterpark also features a FoilTec roof that is permeable to UV rays, allowing people to tan indoors. The resort also closed Fort Wilderness Waterpark, its first indoor waterpark.

In July 2006, Glacier Canyon Lodge, the Wilderness's third property, opened along with a 3.2-acre outdoor waterpark called the Lost World.

In 2008, the Wilderness unveiled Wild Rock Golf Club, a championship 18-hole course containing a difficult hole 17 called "Boneyard North" and renovated the Klondike Kavern waterpark.

In 2009, the Wilderness unveiled three indoor, 3-D, blacklight mini-golf courses, an outdoor mini-golf course, go-karts and a zip line adventure. The resort also opened Tombstone Town Haunted Hotel and Mineshaft Mirror Maze.

In 2010, the Wilderness renovated all of the Wilderness Hotel & Golf Resort guest rooms.

In 2012, the Wilderness opened the Northern Lights Sky Ropes Course, located in the Wild West region of the hotel. The resort also added the Lunar Loop and Cosmic Drop Whitewater West Drop Slides at the Lost World Water Park.

In 2015, the resort would redo the Klondike Krash Water Slides would be turned in the Claim Jumper Challenge Water Slides, two dueling Whitewater West Slide boarding slides.

Today, the Wilderness Territory occupies over 600 acres (2.4 km^{2}) of land and provides guests with 1,163 lodging options among its three main properties (Wilderness Hotel & Golf Resort, Wilderness on the Lake and Glacier Canyon Lodge), in addition to its freestanding Vacation Villas, Cabins and New Frontier Condominiums. The Territory is home to four indoor and four outdoor waterparks totaling nearly 500,000 square feet (46,000 m^{2}). The resort also features Wild Rock Golf Club, and the Wilderness Woods Par 3 Family Course. A skywalk is connected to the Glacier Canyon Lodge, and boats take guests to the Wilderness on the Lake Resort.

=== Wild Rock Golf Club ===
Wild Rock Golf Club
Tee	Rating/Slope	1	2	3	4	5	6	7	8	9	Out	10	11	12	13	14	15	16	17	18	In	Total
Black	76.5 / 141	559	421	464	223	349	588	493	433	211	3741	567	241	450	453	535	179	456	356	436	3673	7414
Blue	74.5 / 135	530	399	446	186	325	551	460	412	179	3488	547	223	424	430	514	166	415	334	412	3465	6953
White	70.8 / 134	497	374	414	164	300	525	397	362	146	3179	533	182	403	403	487	148	381	306	371	3214	6393
Gold	67.5 / 124	428	341	306	140	259	504	360	313	127	2778	510	156	381	364	458	130	352	280	337	2968	5746
Red	69.6 / 124	416	309	287	112	234	457	338	260	109	2522	399	128	364	304	407	118	329	259	302	2610	5132
SI		3	13	7	9	17	1	5	11	15		2	6	10	4	8	14	16	18	12
Par		5	4	4	3	4	5	4	4	3	36	5	3	4	4	5	3	4	4	4	36	72

== Resort Areas ==
=== New Frontier Area ===
This area is themed after Western United States forests and mountain ranges. Its buildings are painted brown with highlights of green and black.

==== Features ====
===== Klondike Kavern Indoor Waterpark =====
- 65,000 square feet (6,000 m^{2})
- Opened in 1999
- Klondike-themed
- Claim Jumper Challenge (1999), two 500 ft (150 m) Proslide PIPElines retrofitted with Slideboarding in 2015
  - Known as Klondike Krash from 1999 to 2015
  - Originally emptied into Bonanza Brook
    - New fiberglass runouts made by WhiteWater were added when Slideboarding debuted
- Mine Shaft (1999), two high speed Proslide Twister body slides
  - One of the slides is only for guests 150 pounds or less
- Bonanza Brook (1999), a 500 ft (150 m) lazy river
- Bonanza Bluff (2007), an SCS Interactive water play structure
- The Hurricane (2005), a 2–4 rider, multi-sensory ProSlide Tornado 60.
  - Originally opened as an open air, outdoor slide before the funnel was capped in late 2005
  - Received theming upgrades in 2007 including a fake newscast of a hurricane coming off of the Great Lakes
  - This is a separately themed ride from the rest of the waterpark, similarly to its sister ride, Black Hole.
- Sulfur Springs (1999), Indoor/Outdoor Spas & Pools
- Kodiak Kanteen, snack bar
- Former Attractions
  - Gold Mine Mountain (1999), an interactive water play structure
    - Replaced in 2007 by Bonanza Bluff due to sightline complaint issues from parents

===== Wild WaterDome Indoor Waterpark =====
- 70,000 square feet (6,500 m^{2})
- Opened in 2006
- Originally announced as the Wild KingDome Waterpark
- Transparent roof, for tanning and plant growth
- The Great Wave (2004), wave pool
  - Originally opened outdoors as The Great Tsunami
    - Wild WaterDome was built around it
- Mini-Mammoths Cove, a zero-depth toddler activity area
- The Dueling Mammoth (2006), Proslide Mammoth racing family raft rides
  - One of the slides was removed and will be replaced with Volcano Vortex, a Proslide HIVE waterslide that will open in 2026
- Survivor's Bar & Grill
- Wooly's Eatery, snack bar
- Private cabanas
- Margarita's Swim-Up Bar (Summer 2014)

===== New Frontier Outdoor Waterpark =====
- 110,000 square feet (10,000 m^{2})
- Opened in 1996
- Gold Rush Tube Slide (1998), a 400 ft (120 m) enclosed Proslide Pipeline tube slide
- Gold Rush Body Slide (1998), a mostly open Pro slide Twister body slide
- Timber Falls Tube Slide (1996), a Proslide Pipeline tube slide that launches off a 30-foot tower.
- Prospector's Creek (1998), a 600-foot (180 m) lazy river
- Toddler's Cove, a zero-depth play area.
- Banana Slides (1996), Proslide short body slides for small children.
- New Frontier Springs, a large hot spa
- Bear Foot Island Spray ground (2013), an oasis area for children under 48" and their parents.
- Raccoon Saloon
- Former Attractions
  - Bear Foot Island (1998), NBGS International aquatic play structure
    - Replaced by Bear Foot Island Spray ground.
  - The Great Tsunami (2004), Wave Pool
    - Still in use, however the Wild WaterDome has been built around it

===== New Frontier Atrium =====
- Wilder woods Arcade, arcade
- Wildwoods Go-Kart Trail, (2014) 525 foot go-kart course
- Take Flight (2020), SimEx Iwerks Flyride
- Tommyknockers Bar
- Wild Canyon Cafe
- Fast Molly's Gift Shop
- Survivor's Bar and Grille
- Former Attractions
  - OK Corral Lazer Tag (2004 to 2020)
    - Powered by Lazer Runner
    - Originally located above Klondike Kavern Waterpark, current home of the Klondike Boardwalk
    - Moved to the former location of Fort Wilderness and later Tombstone Town near the New Frontier Lobby in 2014
    - Moved to former location of CyVRspace and Wild Buccaneer in 2020 with a new Lazer tag system
  - Marshall Training Lazer Maze Vault (2014 to 2020)
  - Tombstone Town and Mineshaft Mirror Maze (2009 to 2013)
  - Fort Wilderness Waterpark (1995 to 2005)
    - Upgraded in 2002, adding another deck and repositioning slides to the back of the play structure
    - Also features a basketball pool, sauna, and hot tub

===== Guestroom Area =====
- Polka Dot Pots, children's pottery studio

=== Wild West Area ===
This area is themed after the American West in the 1800s and its buildings are painted crimson with brown highlights.

==== Features ====
===== Wild West Indoor Waterpark =====
- 70,000 square feet (6,500 m^{2})
- Opened in 2003 at a cost of $10 million
- Western gold mine-themed
- Fantastic Voyage (2003), Proslide Mammoth family raft ride
- The Black Hole (2005), a single-rider, multi-sensory ProSlide CannonBowl
  - Originally opened as an open air, outdoor slide before the bowl was capped in late 2005
  - Originally names Cannonbowl, renamed and rethemed in 2008 as the Black Hole
  - Separately themed from the rest of the waterpark
- High Plains Hot Springs, an indoor/outdoor spa
- Grizzly's Grill, snack bar
- The Swimm'n Chick'n, restaurant
- The Twisted Trails Dueling Tube Slides With Eye Dropped Trusclent Points
- The Warped Wagons Dueling Mat Slide With The Same Feature As Twisted Trails
- Ransack Ridge V2 Opened October 1st 2022 To The Public
- Yeehaw's Watering Hole A Swim Up Bar
- Former Attractions
  - Wilderness Express (2003 to 2022), Proslide PIPEline tube slide Thirsty Buffalo Restaurant (2003 to 2022)
  - Wild West Body Slides (2003 to 2022), four high-speed Proslide Twister slides
    - Two slides on the left side, nearest the Black Hole, have not been in use in some time
      - Last known day of operation is unknown
  - Ransack Ridge (2003 to 2022), a NBGS International interactive water-play structure
    - Opened as the largest aquatic play structure in the world
  - Surge (2003 to 2009), a NBGS International interactive wave pool
- Wild West Bumper Boats 2009-2022 Closed For Yeehaw's Watering Hole

===== Lake Wilderness Outdoor Waterpark =====
- 40,000 square feet (3,700 m^{2})
- Rafter's Rage Tube Slide (2002), a 300-foot (91 m) Proslide PIPEline tube slide
- Rafter's Rage Body Slide (2002), a 220-foot (67 m) Proslide Twister body slide
- Lil' Chutes Banana Slides (2002), two side-by-side Proslide body slides for little ones
- A children's wading pool with hands on water features
- Island Pool, a 13,000 square feet (1,200 m^{2}) lazy lake complete with sideline play activities and built-in lounging ridge
- A lap pool and water basketball
- Lily pad obstacle walk
- Volleyball pool
- Hot spas
- Mackinac Tap & Snack Shack
- Midway Macs Outdoor Grill
- 9 private poolside cabanas available for rent

===== Wild West Area - Dodge 'Em City =====
- Northern Lights Arcade (2002)
- Northern Lights Ropes Course (2012) RCI Ropes Course above the Northern Lights Arcade
- Timberland Play Park (2002), children's play structure
  - Structure replaced with current attraction in 2017
- Wild Abyss Mini-Golf (2009), indoor, glow-in-the-dark, mini-golf course
  - Received upgrades to current layout and course in 2020
- Lost Cabin Lazer Tag Arena (2020)
- Clip 'N Climb Challenge Walls (2019)
- Pistol Pete's Ice Cream (2004)
- Thirsty Buffalo Bar And Grill
- Candy Cabin
- OP's Marketplace, convenience store
- The Trading Post, gift shop
- Giddy-Up Pub
- Former Attractions
  - CyVRspace (2017 - 2020), a virtual reality arena
  - Wild Buccaneer Mini-Golf (2008 - 2017
  - Sulfur Springs Hot Tub (2002 - 2009)
    - Hot tub for adults to watch children playing in Timberland Play Park
      - Hence the reason for the locker rooms near Timberland today

===== Guestroom Area =====
- Fitness Center

=== Wilderness on the Lake ===
Wilderness on the Lake is an upscale, 108 condominium resort. The property features a 35,000 square feet (3,300 m^{2}) indoor/outdoor waterpark, called Cubby's Cove, which features a pool overlooking Lake Delton. This area is only connected to the main resort by a 10-minute shuttle bus ride, year-round, and a ferry service in the summer. The area is built to appeal to young adults with small children.

Features

Cubby's Cove Waterpark

- 35,000 square feet (3,300 m^{2}) indoor/outdoor waterpark
- Opened in 2003
- Cubby's Cove (2003), NBGS International aquatic play structure for kids
- Indoor/outdoor hot spas
- Water basketball pool and water walk
- Vanishing Edge Lagoon infinity pool (Outdoor)
- Play and spray zero-depth area for small children (Outdoor)

=== Glacier Canyon Lodge ===
The newest resort of the three Wilderness properties located on the Wilderness Territory, this facility is a condominium resort with 460 units. It has an outdoor waterpark (Lost World), which with an interactive river, three hot tubs, activity pools, and Halley's Comet Racers. This area also includes a 55,661-square-foot (5,171.1 m^{2}) Conference Center, a mega-arcade, go-karts, and nature trails. Half of this area is owned by Wilderness Territories, the other half is owned by Wyndham Resorts.

==== Features ====
===== Lost World Outdoor Waterpark =====
- Largest outdoor waterpark In Wilderness Resort spanning 3.2 acres
- Opened in 2006
- Dinosaur-themed
- Lost World Adventure River (2006), an interactive lazy river
- Halley's Comet Racers (2007), a four lane Proslide OctopusRACER mat racing slide
- Fossil Falls (2006), a SCS Interactive play-'n-spray structure with a 750-gallon tipping bucket
- Crocodile Cove (2006), an island pool designed for lounging
- Dino Mania (2006), an area with water basketball, lily pad water walk activity, and two sport slides
- 15 private, poolside cabanas available for rent
- Lunar Loop (2012), 5 story WhiteWater AquaLoop slide with launch capsules
- The Cosmic Drop (2012), 5-story WhiteWater AquaDrop body slide with launch capsules
- Three outdoor hot spas
- The Big Dig Restaurant
- Dinosaur Crossing Restaurant
- T-Rex Retreat
- Jurassic Joe's

===== Outdoor Area =====
- Go-Karts and Kiddie-Karts (2009)
- Jurassic outdoor mini-golf (2009)
- Wyndham outdoor pool
- Jurassic Journey Nature Trail
- Lost Canyon Zipline (2009)
- Picnic area
- Lost Canyon Carriage Tours, private, not advertised by Wilderness, only accessible outside the resort. The land is leased to Lost Canyon Riding Stable by Wilderness Territory.

===== GCL Conference Center =====
- Conference Center
- Bean Bodega Coffee Shop
- Convenience store

===== Wyndham Lobby =====
- Canyon Ridge Tap Room And Restaurant
- Campside Coffee Shop

===== Outlets =====
- Field's Premier Steakhouse, part of the Wilderness resort, on Wilderness property.
- Sarento's Italian Restaurant, part of the Wilderness Resort, short shuttle bus down the road.
- Monk's At The Wilderness restaurant, private, advertised by Wilderness as part of the resort, on Wilderness property.

== Wilderness Transportation System ==
The Wilderness operates a shuttle bus system with three lines:

- Blue Line - between the main campus and Wilderness On The Lake
- Red Line - between the main campus, Sundara Inn And Spa, Wild Rock Golf Course, Wilderness Condos, and Wilderness Vacation Villas.
- Green Line - between the main campus, Glacier Canyon Lodge, and Wyndham Glacier Canyon. Stops at many more locations on the main campus than the other two lines.

In addition, Wilderness Territory operates a ferry service called Wilderness Water Shuttle between the Wild Rock Golf Course, Wilderness On The Lake, and two other Lake Delton harbors during the summer.
