= Noah's Ark Water Park =

Outdoor water park in Wisconsin, United States

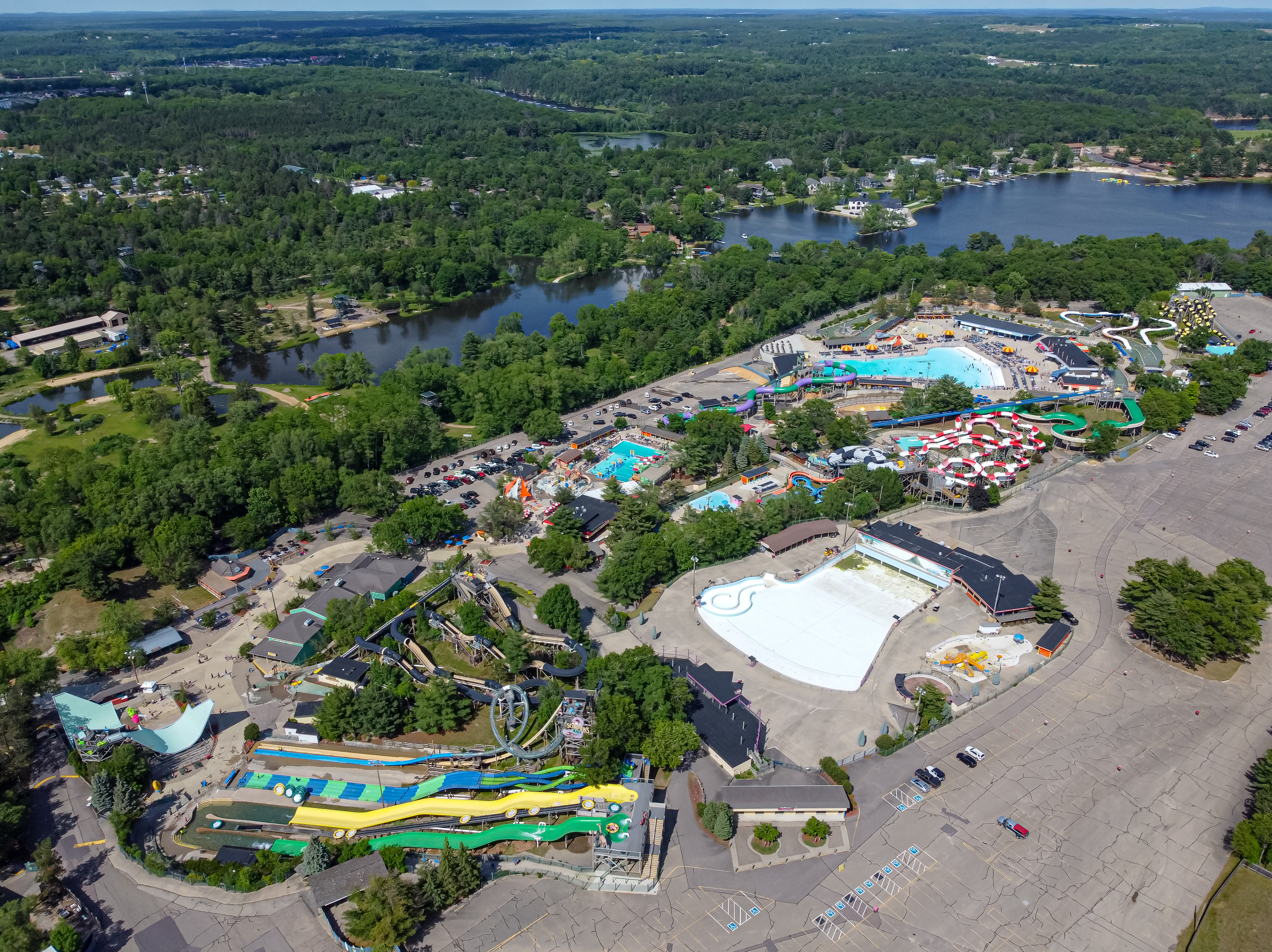
- Interactive map of Noah's Ark Water Park
- Slogan: "America's Largest Waterpark"
- Location: Lake Delton, Wisconsin, United States
- Coordinates: 43.603578°N 89.786282°W
- Owner: Herschend
- Opened: 1979
- Operating season: May through September
- Area: 70 acres (280,000 m^{2})
- Pools: 2 pools
- Water slides: 47 (as of 2025) water slides
- Website: noahsarkwaterpark.com

Noah's Ark Family Park Inc. is the largest outdoor water park in the United States. It features 51 water slides and dozens of various attractions. The park is located in the village of Lake Delton, Wisconsin.

== History ==
In 1979, the Waterman family purchased 205 feet (62 m) of frontage property on U.S. Route 12 in Wisconsin Dells, Wisconsin, and created a bumper boat ride and built a go-kart track, which replaced the Delton Outdoor Theatre, the area's drive-in theater. The park opened as "Noah's Incredible Adventure," also the name of a Noah's Ark attraction in 2003. In 1994, the Gantz family of Dubuque, Iowa, purchased Noah's Ark and added the "OctoExplorer", a yellow submarine with a moving periscope, water guns and soft-surfaced waterslides. In 2003, Noah's Ark Waterpark celebrated 25 years of operation. In 2012, the park was purchased by Palace Entertainment.

Since Palace Entertainment took ownership, six attractions have been closed, and three have been added. Other changes include fencing the park's perimeter, removing per-use lockers, and instituting parking fees. During this ownership period, the park has seen numerous general infrastructure upgrades, including remodels of the bathroom, restaurant, and store; a 400-person dormitory for employees; an employee cafeteria; a convenience store; and new Human Resources offices.

An electrical fire destroyed the iconic ark structure at the front of the park in 2012. Originally a ticket office, the ark was being used as a museum and storage facility at the time of the fire. A new ark was built in homage to the original ark on top of the Flash Flood splash bridge.

On March 13, 2020, the park was closed due to the COVID-19 pandemic lockdown. It opened later on June 20, 2020, but closed early on August 1, 2020, for the rest of the season after two employees tested positive for the virus.

In early 2025, the park was sold to Herschend.

== Rides ==
=== Waterslides ===
- Toucan Twister (1985) – 3 adult bodyslides and 2 child slides.
  - Technetic Industries Slide-A-Ride
  - Previously named Slidewinder (1985–2017)
  - Originally opened with four slides (2 adult and 2 child)
    - Expanded in 1986 adding the left most adult slide (currently orange)
- The Bermuda Triangle (1988) – Three tube slides
- Monkey Rapids (1989) – Three tube slides that empty into Adventure River.
  - Previously named Bahama Falls (1989–2017)
- Congo Bongo (1991) – Proslide Mammoth family raft ride with turns
  - More than 100 pieces of fiberglass, each costing $3,000 a piece
  - Total cost was 1.3 million
  - 700 feet long
  - Uses 600,000 gallons per hour
  - Tube conveyor was added in 1994
- Kowabunga (1993) – One Proslide TurboMammoth and one BubbaTub from WaterWorld Products
  - Family raft speed slides that go down without turns.
  - Two similar family raft rides each featuring three bumps
  - Oddity in that the two slides are essentially the same ride, just by two different manufacturers side-by-side
- Black Thunder (1995) – Proslide Pipeline, two-person or single tube slides in the dark.
  - Consisting of two TurboPIPElines (Witches Gulch) and two PIPElines (Twin Twisters)
- Chameleon (1997, revamped in 2023) – Enclosed Proslide Mammoth family raft slide with light and sound effects.
  - Previously named Dark Voyage (1995–2017) and Flying Gecko (2018-2022)
- Point of No Return (2001) – 10-story-tall Proslide speedslide that takes riders 4 seconds to descend.
  - Originally two side-by-side slides, one of the slides was taken down and replaced with Scorpion's Tail.
    - The bottom runout remains the same
- Sting Ray (2002) – Two large halfpipes from Water Fun Products
  - Replaced Tank Tag
- Black Anaconda (2005) – Proslide Rocket Water Coaster
  - First Generation Proslide water coaster, uses conveyor belts instead of magnets or water in Proslide's later water coasters
  - One of America's longest watercoasters
  - Replaced Thunder Rapids Tube Ride
- Time Warp (2006) – Proslide BehemothBowl 60
  - The world's largest bowl ride
    - It is a clone of the former Disco H2O at Wet n Wild (which closed in 2016).
- Scorpion's Tail (2010) – Whitewater West AquaLoop
  - America's first upside-down looping body slide
  - Drops riders down from a trap door in a capsule into an almost inverted loop
  - Replaced a Point of No Return Slide
- Quadzilla (2012) – Proslide Kraken Racer
  - Four braided head-first slides
  - Replaced The Plunge
- Raja (2018) – Polin King Cobra
  - Replaced Bumper Boats

=== Wave pools ===
- The Wave (1987) – Wavetek Wave Pool
  - It was with this addition that Noah's Ark became America's Largest Waterpark
  - Opened as the largest wave pool in the Midwest and sixth largest in the country
  - Has capability of producing eight different types of waves
- Big Kahuna (1989) – Wavetek Wave Pool
  - Once the largest wave pool in Wisconsin Dells, now eclipsed by Mt. Olympus's Surf Pool
  - As of 2015, it cost $1,500 a day to make the waves

=== Lazy Rivers ===
- Endless River (1985) – Simple Lazy River
  - Thought to be the first in the Midwest and fourth in the world upon opening
  - Originally known as Lazy River and was 1/4 of a mile, stretching around only Toucan Twisters
  - Expanded in 1986 to 1/3 of a mile, stretching to the splash pool of Bermuda Triangle when it would be installed
    - This created the only figure 8 lazy river in the country
  - Was simplified to current oval shape in 2006 when Time Warp was installed
- Adventure River (1989)
  - Originally featured small waves and rapids

=== Other Attractions ===
- Paradise Lagoon (1984) – An activity pool
  - Features slides (Chutes and Motels), zip-lines, and a water walk
    - Motel slide manufactured by Aquaslide
- OctoExplorer (1994) – Children's play area made by NBGS
  - Marketed as "A Yellow Submarine with Moving Periscope, Water Geysers, Interactive Play Equipment and Soft Slides" from the manufacturer
  - Repainted and refurbished in 2016
- Flash Flood (1999) – Hopkins Rides Shoot the Chute.
  - 20-passenger boat that descends a 50-foot (15 m) drop into a large pool; includes bridge observation area which gets hit by the subsequent wall of water.
- Noah's 4-D Dive-In Theater (2007) – Midwest's Largest 4-D Theater
  - Currently Standing but Not Operating, status is unknown
- Tadpole Bay Kiddie Kingdom (2008) – SCS Interactive children's play area
  - Features Noah's Ark theme, 4 kiddie waterslides, over 50 water features, and an 800-gallon bucket dump.
- Surfing Safari (2013) – Single FlowRider stationary surf attraction
  - Replaced portions of land that Jungle Rapids once stood

=== Former attractions ===
- Can-Am Race Cars (1979)
  - Removed in 1998 and replaced by Flash Flood
- Bumper Boats (1979) – First Attraction Built At Noah's Ark
  - Taken out in 2018, replaced by Raja.
- Jungle Rapids (1980) – Five Tube and mat slides
  - Technetic Industries Slide-A-Ride
  - Originally opened with three slides, with two additional slides opening in 1982
  - The park’s oldest water attraction
  - First fiberglass waterslide in the area
  - For the 2013 the entire complex was demolished
  - Portions replaced by Surfing Safari
- Miniature Golf (1980) – 18 holes.
  - Reopened in the 2019 season.
  - Currently standing but not operating, status is unknown
- Thunder Rapids (1982) – Three interweaving hillside concrete tube chute style rides
  - Originally two tube chutes with an additional run opening in 1984
  - One was removed when Point of No Return was installed
  - Other two were removed for Black Anaconda
  - Referred to as Mountain Mania Innertube Ride on a brochure from the early 1980s
- Baja Racers (1983? ) - Off Road Go Karts
  - Removed in 1984? for Paradise Lagoon
- Dune Cats (1983?) - Off Road Go Karts
  - Removed in 1984? for Paradise Lagoon
- The Plunge (1984) – two belly-down, face first racing mat slides.
  - Technetic Industries Bonzi
  - Replaced by Quadzilla in 2012
  - Referred to as Bonzi Water Slide on a brochure from the early 1980s
    - Bonzi, however, is the slide type and it is believed these brochures were printed before The Plunge name was selected
- Kiddie Bumper Boats (1987)
  - Located next to The Wave
  - Replaced with Hooligan's Harbor RC Boats in 2018
  - Manufactured by World Famous Kiddie Bumper Boats
- Kiddie Race Cars (1987)
  - Removed in 1998 and replaced by Flash Flood
- King of the Mountain (1987)
  - Several play structures for children which were slowly removed from kiddie areas
- Tank Tag (1989) – a game where participants shoot tennis balls at targets for points from stationary guns, and mobile tanks.
  - Taken down in 2001 and replaced with the Sting Ray.
- Go Gator (1990?) Wisdom kiddie roller coaster.
  - Closed in 2012
- Noah's Incredible Adventure (2003) – Mack Mystery Swing
  - A high-capacity, dry amusement ride which involved a large "Mystery Swing" and special visual effects to recreate a journey on Noah's famous ark. It was replaced by Curse of the Crypt in the same building in 2009.
- SpongeBob SquarePants 4-D (2007) – featured at Noah's Dive-In Theater from 2007 to 2010. Was replaced with Pirates 4-D in 2011. Pirates 4-D replaced by “Ice Age 4-D” in 2015. In 2017 the ride was made into “The LEGO Movie The 4-D Experience”
- Curse of the Crypt (2009) – Mack Rides Mystery Swing.
  - Rethemed version of Noah's Incredible Adventure
  - Closed in 2012, standing but not operating
