= The Wonder Spot =

Tourist attraction in Wisconsin, US

Coordinates: 43.5878°N 89.7861°W

The Wonder Spot was a tourist attraction located off US Route 12 in Lake Delton, Wisconsin from 1949 to 2006. A popular side trip for visitors to nearby Wisconsin Dells, the Wonder Spot was advertised as a place "where the laws of natural gravity seem to be repealed." Visitors walked down a ravine into a cabin, where seemingly no one could stand up straight, water flowed backwards, and chairs could be balanced on two legs. Guides attributed the effects to igneous rock formations, but in truth, the cabin was built perpendicular to a hillside, and the purported gravitational anomalies were merely optical illusions.

Louis Dauterman of Fond du Lac, Wisconsin opened the Wonder Spot in 1952, and Bill Carney purchased it in 1988. According to Carney, as many as 50,000 visitors came to the site each year during the mid-1990s. However, when more sophisticated theme parks and water parks in the area began threatening his business, Carney decided to sell the site to the village of Lake Delton in 2006 for $300,000. The village planned to build a road near the ravine. At the time of its closing, the Wonder Spot was the oldest permitted attraction in the Wisconsin Dells region. A few items from the Wonder Spot, such as a chair and a can used for pouring water, were donated to the Wisconsin Historical Society.

== See also ==
- Gravity hill
