= Emergency Wetlands Reserve Program =

United States federal environmental program

The Emergency Wetlands Reserve Program (EWRP), authorized in 1993 under emergency supplemental appropriations to respond to widespread floods in the Midwest, provided payments to purchase easements and partial financial assistance to landowners who permanently restored wetlands at sites where the restoration costs exceeded the land's fair market value. EWRP was administered by Natural Resources Conservation Service (NRCS) as part of its Emergency Watershed Program and operated in seven Midwestern states. Land in this program is considered to be a part of the land enrolled in the Wetland Reserve Program.

The current Emergency Watershed Protection program of the NRCS includes special enrollment opportunities for Floodplain Easement Projects, largely along the same guidelines as the original EWRP
