= Polynesian Resort Hotel =

Water park resort in Wisconsin Dells

- Location: Wisconsin Dells
- Coordinates: 43.62571°N 89.80205°W
- Theme: Tropical
- Operating season: Year-round
- Website: http://www.dellspolynesian.com/

The Polynesian Resort Hotel is a water park resort located in Wisconsin Dells, Wisconsin. It was opened in 1989 and became the Wisconsin Dells's first indoor waterpark in 1994.

== Overview ==
The resort is built around a tropical theme based on the Polynesian islands. Compared to its surrounding resorts and hotels, The Polynesian Resort Hotel is one of the smaller resorts in the Wisconsin Dells. It has a combined total of 200,000 square feet of indoor and outdoor waterparks.
