= Lake Delton (Wisconsin) =

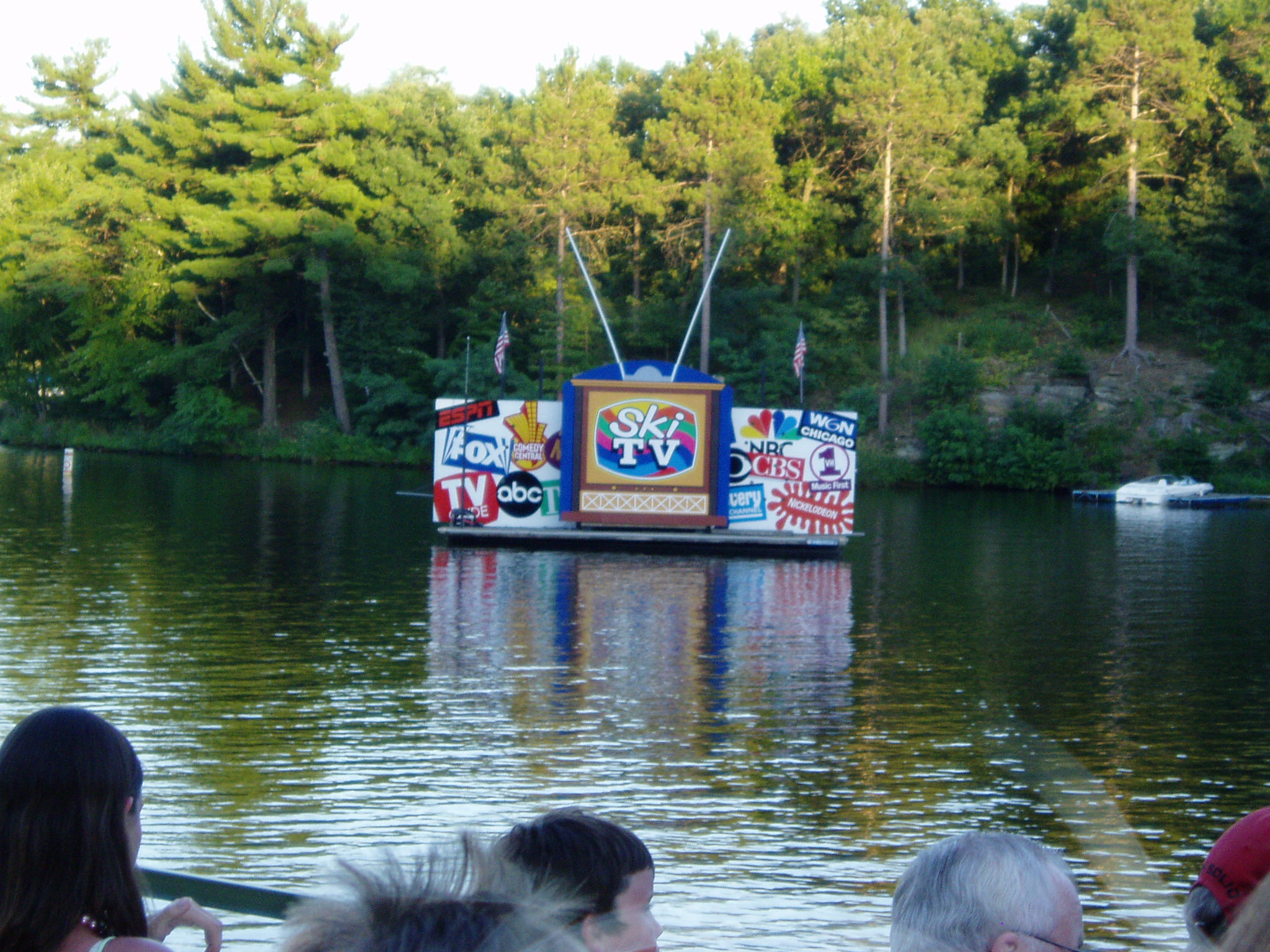
- Tommy Bartlett's Thrill Show in 2005

- Location within Wisconsin Location within the United States
- Location: Lake Delton, Wisconsin
- Coordinates: 43°36′01″N 89°46′42″W
- Lake type: Reservoir
- Primary inflows: Dell Creek
- Primary outflows: Wisconsin River
- Basin countries: United States
- Surface area: 267 acres (108 ha)
- Average depth: 12 ft (3.7 m)
- Max. depth: 16 ft (4.9 m)
- Water volume: 600,000,000 US gal (2,300,000 m^{3})
- Surface elevation: 833 ft (254 m)
- Settlements: Lake Delton

Lake Delton is a man-made freshwater lake in Sauk County in central Wisconsin. For much of 2008, it was a mostly empty lake basin after a portion of a county highway that forms part of the dike wall eroded on June 9, 2008, under the pressure of floods in the area. The resulting wash out caused the lake to empty into the Wisconsin River, leaving behind only rainwater pools and the flow from Dell Creek. By March 2009, major repairs to correct the problem were completed, and the lake was allowed to refill. Minor repairs were expected to continue after that time, but the lake is now completely refilled and has been usable since Memorial Day weekend of 2009.

The lake was formed in 1927 to attract tourists to the area and became a popular attraction in the Wisconsin Dells tourist area following the economic recovery after the Great Depression. Resorts and tourist attractions line its banks. The lake was the site of Tommy Bartlett's Thrill Show, which featured acrobatic water skiing.

== History ==
In 1926, Chicago construction company owner William J. Newman decided to build a resort area in the tiny Delton, Wisconsin area (as the community of Lake Delton had been known at the time). Newman engaged a local land agent to purchase tracts of land along both banks of a stretch of Dell Creek. After taking title to the tracts, Newman brought engineers and construction crews to the area, who built a 30 feet (9.1 m) high dam near the confluence of Dell Creek and the Wisconsin River. They built a 1,000-foot-long (300 m) dike along the dam. They also created 1,000 acres (400 ha) of artificial shoreline for the resort area.

Newman was particularly knowledgeable about dam and dike construction as his companies had done a majority of the caisson work that downtown Chicago skyscrapers are built upon. Caisson work involves building retaining, watertight structures used, for example, to work on the foundations of a bridge pier or for the construction of a concrete dam.

On July 27, 1927, they closed the dam's sluice gates and allowed Dell Creek to fill up the lake basin that had been excavated and graded behind the dam. This resulted in a large pooling of water from the flow of Dell Creek, which was named Lake Delton. Newman had spent $600,000 on the construction by that date and expected to spend another $400,000 to build the resort. They built a lock between the lake and the Wisconsin River to allow small boats and canoes to travel between the bodies of water.

To decorate his own summer home on Lake Delton, Newman transported several sculptures and concrete blocks he saved from the rubble of Midway Gardens (1913, Chicago, Illinois; demolished 1929), the last of Frank Lloyd Wright's Prairie Style buildings, which had stood near the Lake Michigan shoreline in downtown Chicago. Newman's company had been hired in 1929 to demolish the structure. Years later, when Wright heard of the survival of the sculptures and blocks, he purchased them and they remained with his estate. As recently as 1999, a block was found buried on the property of Newman's old summer home on Lake Delton and was donated to the Chicago Historical Society.

Newman ran the resort until the Great Depression caused him to file for bankruptcy protection. The Lake Delton enterprise was barely able to survive, and in the 1940s Newman's interest was sold to an investment group, called the Lake Delton Development Corporation. The Lake Delton resort area was more successful after World War II, when tourism increased in the Dells area with Tommy Bartlett's water show.

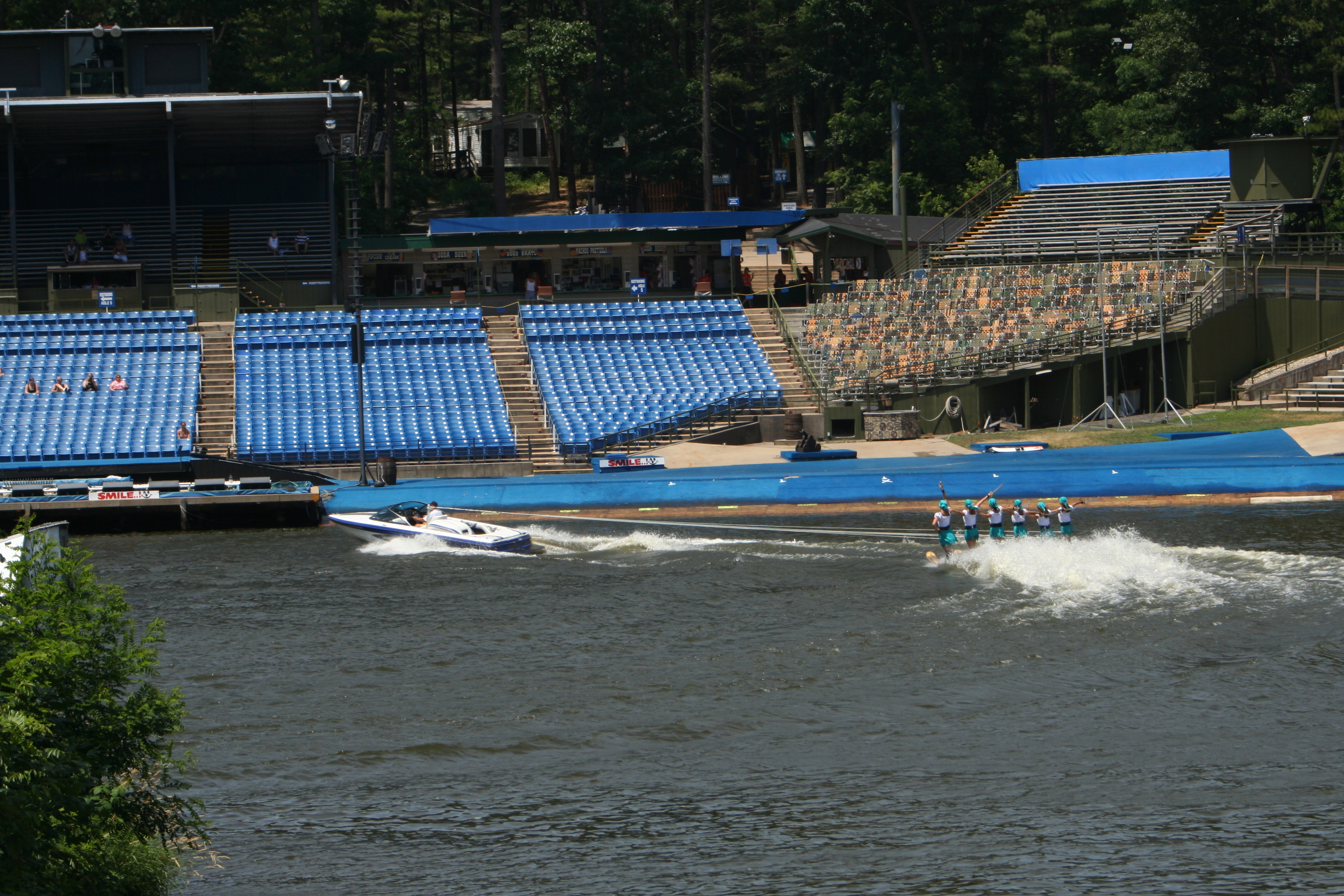
Looking over Lake Delton at Bartlett's grandstands in 2007

By the 1980s, the Lake Delton strip had become home to waterparks, resorts and other recreational facilities that made it a mecca for travelers from across the United States. In fact, the local village website boasts that "4.5 million visitors come to the Wisconsin Dells-Lake Delton area each year."

The lake level was drawn down 8 feet (2.4 m) for repairs on the dam in 1983. The inflow recharged the lake in 15 days.

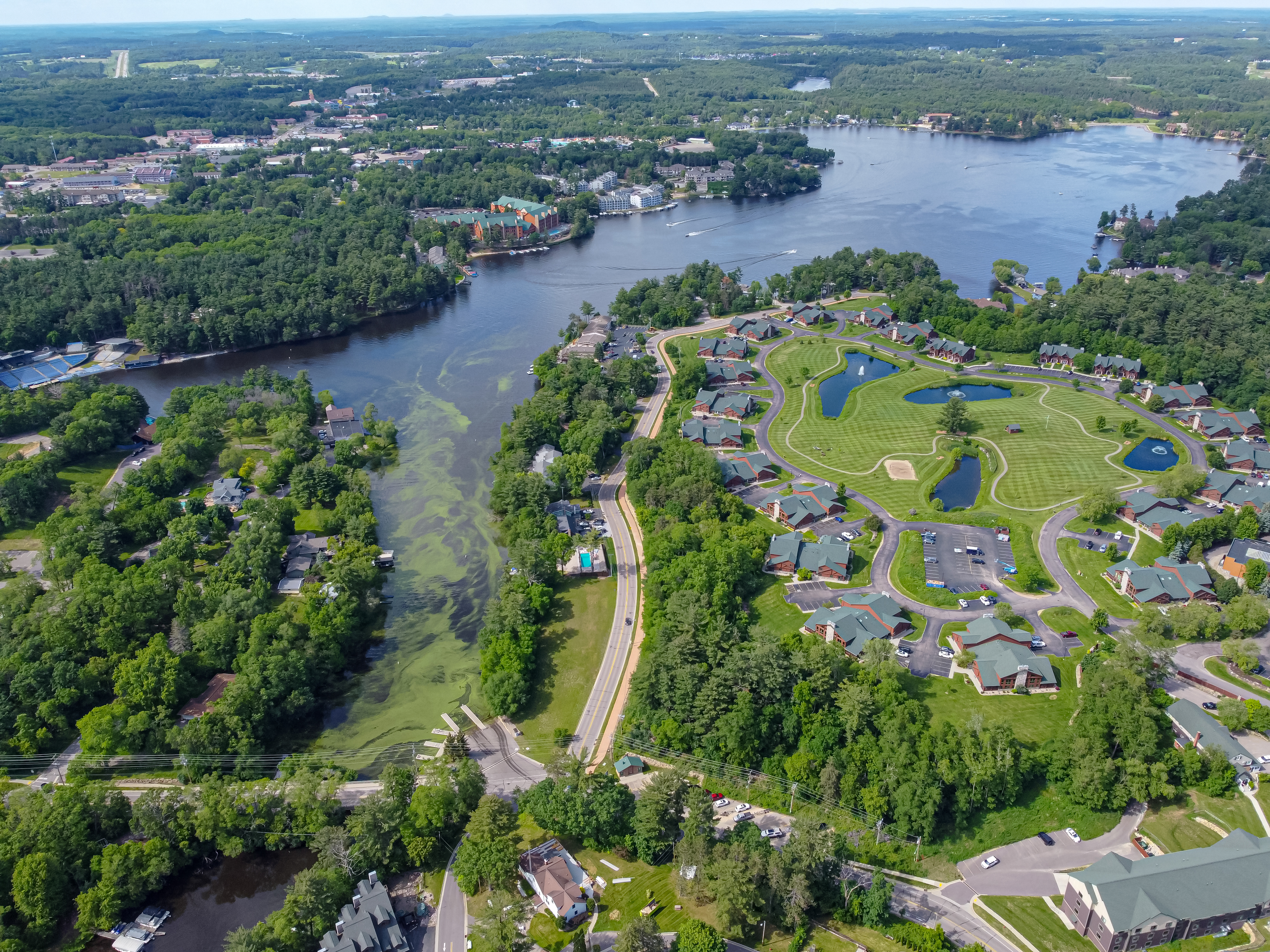
Lake Delton

Much of the shoreline of Lake Delton has been developed with summer homes, year-round homes and condominiums. About 20 resorts surround the lake. Prior to the 2008 washout, the lake had poor water quality, which is common to impoundments in southwest Wisconsin. Some of the water quality problems may have been due to construction site erosion, as well as rural nonpoint source pollution. The lake also had nuisance aquatic weed growth that has required chemical treatment. The fishery of the Lake Delton was northern pike, walleye, largemouth bass, channel catfish and panfish.

== 2008 draining ==
=== Immediate effects ===
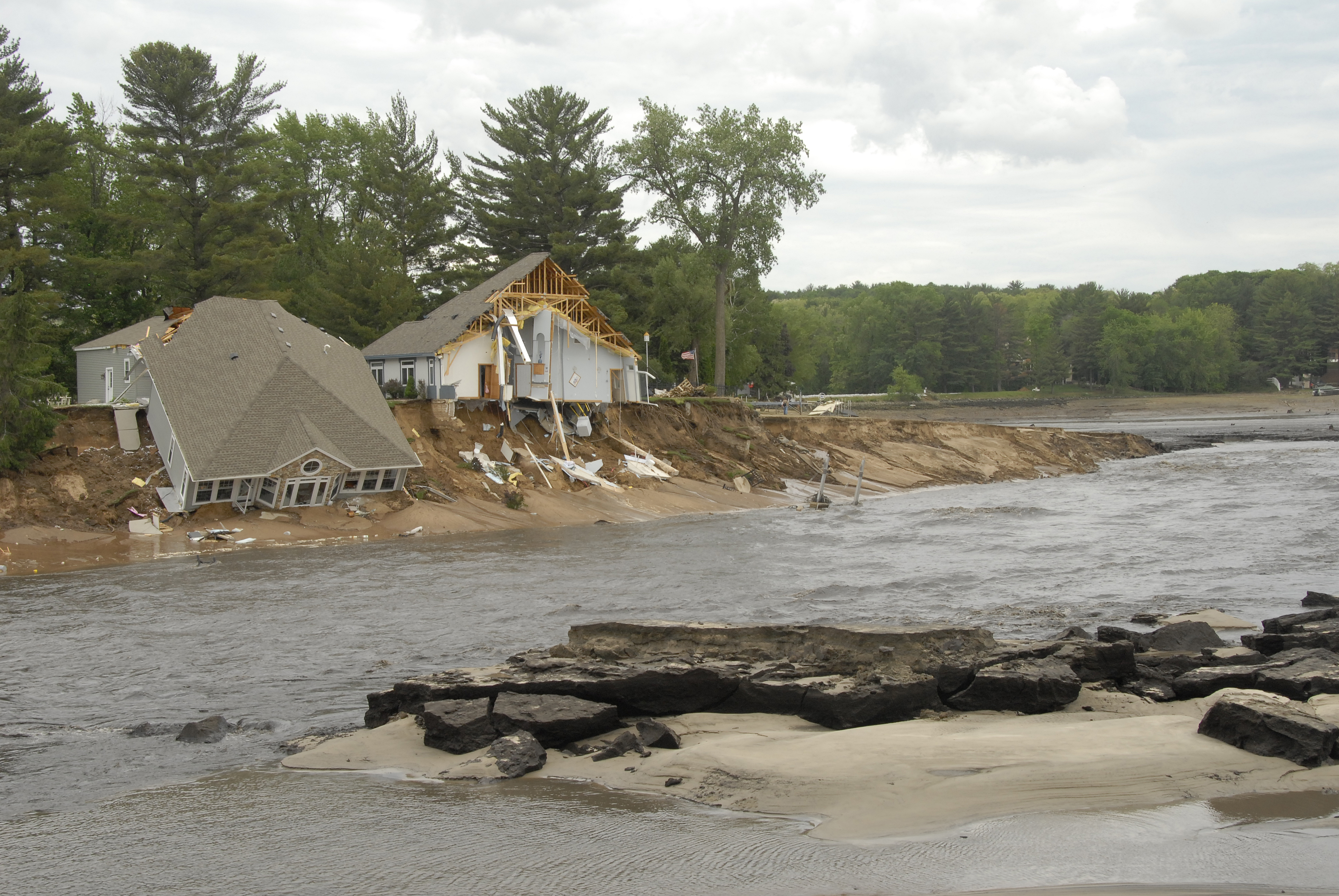
Homes that collapsed into the new channel for Dell Creek created by the flood.

On the morning of June 9, 2008, a 400-foot (120 m) portion of County Trunk Highway A that traverses the north side of Lake Delton failed, creating a new drainage channel to the Wisconsin River. At 2 a.m. that day, 12 inches (300 mm) of rain caused one hundred residents to start sandbagging. The lake waters overflowed County Highway A about a quarter mile from the dam, and most of the lake emptied in two hours. The water began overflowing at approximately 10 a.m. As the water overtopped the isthmus, it flowed downhill to the Wisconsin River approximately 800 feet (240 m) away, quickly eroding and creating a 400-foot-wide (120 m) channel that rapidly drained the lake in an out-of-control torrent into the river, 40 feet (12 m) below the lake's level. Three homes washed away, and another two were destroyed when their foundations were undermined by the new outflow. The sediments at the bottom of the lake were visible. "We have nothing but mud in front of us now," said Tom Diehl, operator of the Tommy Bartlett Show and a Lake Delton village trustee. "No water. Just mud."

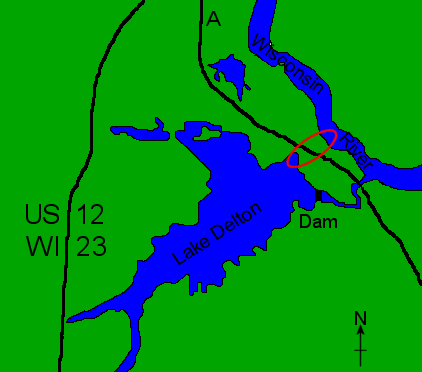
Map of Lake Delton showing the approximate area of the breach along Highway A circled in red

Wisconsin governor Jim Doyle announced on June 10 that the state would repair the lake. He described the lake as crucial to the billion-dollar Wisconsin Dells tourism area. Engineers with the Wisconsin Department of Natural Resources (DNR) were studying the lake, and Doyle said it will only take about two weeks for water from the river to refill the 267-acre (108 ha) lake. It is unknown, however, how long it will take to divert and correct the river's current path back into the lake. Dell Creek is still flowing down to the Wisconsin River, and the lake would be refilled from the creek, once the breach in the highway and collaterally damaged areas are repaired.

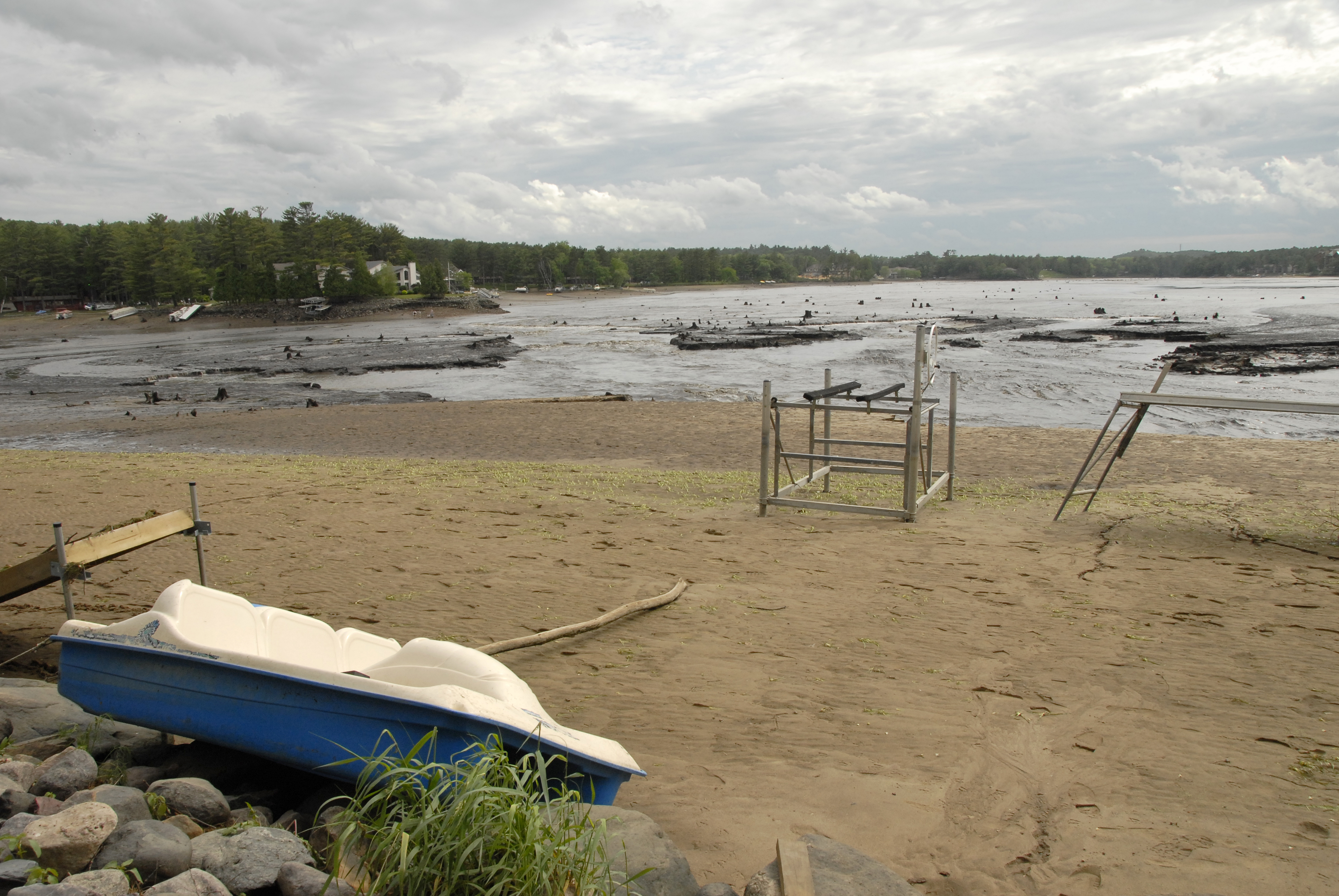
Part of Lake Delton after draining.

Russ Rasmussen, director of watershed management for the DNR, said restoring Lake Delton will be more involved than simply filling in the new channel. "Whatever goes in there will have to be built to dam standards," he added.

Two of the owners whose homes were washed away at the point of the breach were unable to purchase flood insurance. They said that the city told them it was unnecessary, because the lake was dam-controlled. WISC-TV reported that the village had lost its eligibility for the Federal Emergency Management Agency's (FEMA) National Flood Insurance Program after the village failed to formally adopt an updated floodplain map called a "flood insurance rate map" (the official map of a community on which FEMA has delineated both the special hazard areas and the risk premium zones applicable to the community). The village engineer and clerk said the map was not adopted because of "gross inaccuracies" in how FEMA had expanded the floodplain.

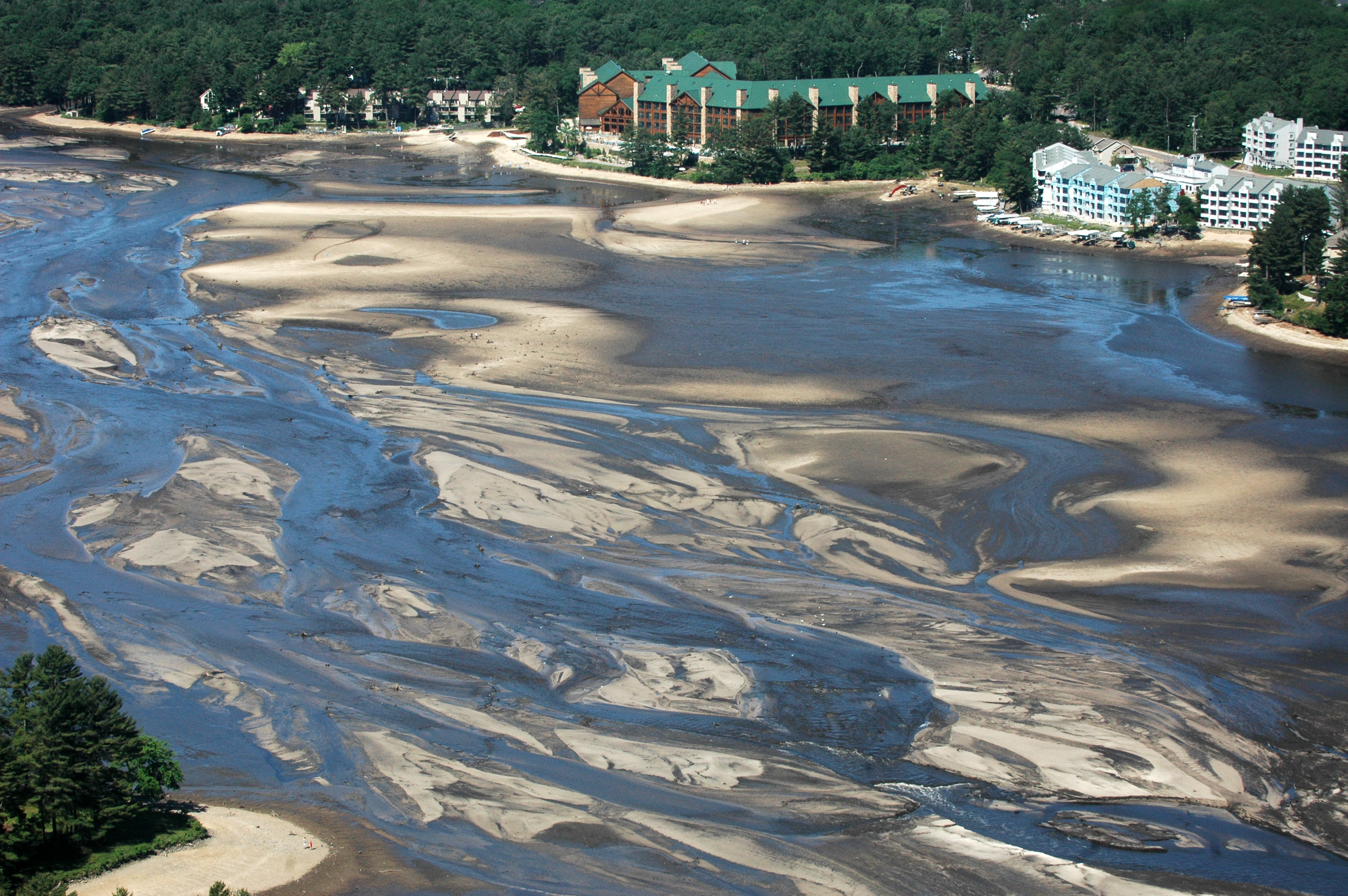
A FEMA aerial view on June 14, 2008 of a drained Lake Delton and several resort hotels.

In an effort to make some good from the situation, local residents organized a "clean the lake bottom" campaign in which interested volunteers walked the empty lakebed before the lake's refilling in order to remove refuse that has collected there. On June 14, 2008, about 250 volunteers, including many who did not live in the area, filled four 20-cubic-yard (15 m^{3}) dumpsters with refuse.

Illusionists Rick and Suzan Wilcox staged a show on June 22, 2008, to benefit families who lost their homes in the Lake Delton flood. In addition, visitors to Noah's Ark Waterpark on June 21, 2008, helped the victims of Lake Delton with the price of admission. The water park donated $2 from every ticket sold on that date to the Lake Delton Flood Relief Fund.

=== Repair and restoration ===
Following the draining of Lake Delton, the U.S. Department of Agriculture and Natural Resources Conservation Service allocated $160,000 to the Village of Lake Delton to redirect Dell Creek back to its normal path and through the Lake Delton Dam. The reconstruction took about 10 days to complete. A cofferdam was built to intercept the water and stop further erosion. A bipartisan congressional effort worked to provide emergency federal funds to midwest areas affected by the June 2008 floods. A bill was signed on June 30, 2008, that provided $390 million for the Emergency Watershed Program, which provides assistance on a matching-fund basis to state and local governmental entities. The Natural Resources Conservation Service estimated that about $500 million in total would be needed for the midwest recovery efforts.

The reparation of the break was coordinated by the Wisconsin Department of Transportation.

Restoration was well underway by the end of October 2008. The gap was filled with 12,000 truckloads of sand and tons of rocks. Sand to fill the gap was donated by a landowner less than a mile away saving $3 million in fuel and material costs. Improvements were also underway on the dam to allow it to withstand a 1,000 year flood without the lake's level rising. The Wisconsin DNR chief of dams stated that the goal was to have the lake refilled by late spring 2009. Highway A was reopened during the last week of November 2008. Water began flowing back into Lake Delton after the dam was closed in early December 2008. An official ceremony was held for December 5, 2008, for both the Highway A reconstruction and the Dam projects. Additionally, rotenone was used to kill carp prior to the commencement of refilling. In February 2009, it was announced that the lake was expected to be refilled by Memorial Day weekend. Costs to the State of Wisconsin were said to be $3.6 million and $2.5 million was spent by the village of Lake Delton.

On June 9, 2009, Wisconsin Governor Jim Doyle was in Wisconsin Dells to help celebrate the reopening of Lake Delton. The lake is at an average depth of 12 feet. Minnows have been released into the lake, and 9,000 walleye fingerlings were released in July 2009.

== Climate ==
Lake Delton

Climate chart (precipitation, max. and min. temperature)
J	F	M	A	M	J	J	A	S	O	N	D
63 −9 −13	67 −6 −14	84 4 −7	161 18 1	147 21 9	193 26 15	80 27 17	97 25 18	81 21 13	104 15 5	63 6 −1	63 −5 −9
- █ Average max. and min. temperatures in °C
- █ Precipitation totals in mm
Imperial conversion
J	F	M	A	M	J	J	A	S	O	N	D
2.5 16 9	2.6 21 7	3.3 39 19	6.3 64 34	5.8 70 48	7.6 79 59	3.1 81 63	3.8 77 64	3.2 70 55	4.1 59 41	2.5 43 30	2.5 23 16
- █ Average max. and min. temperatures in °F
- █ Precipitation totals in inches
