= Wisconsin Dells, Wisconsin =

- City
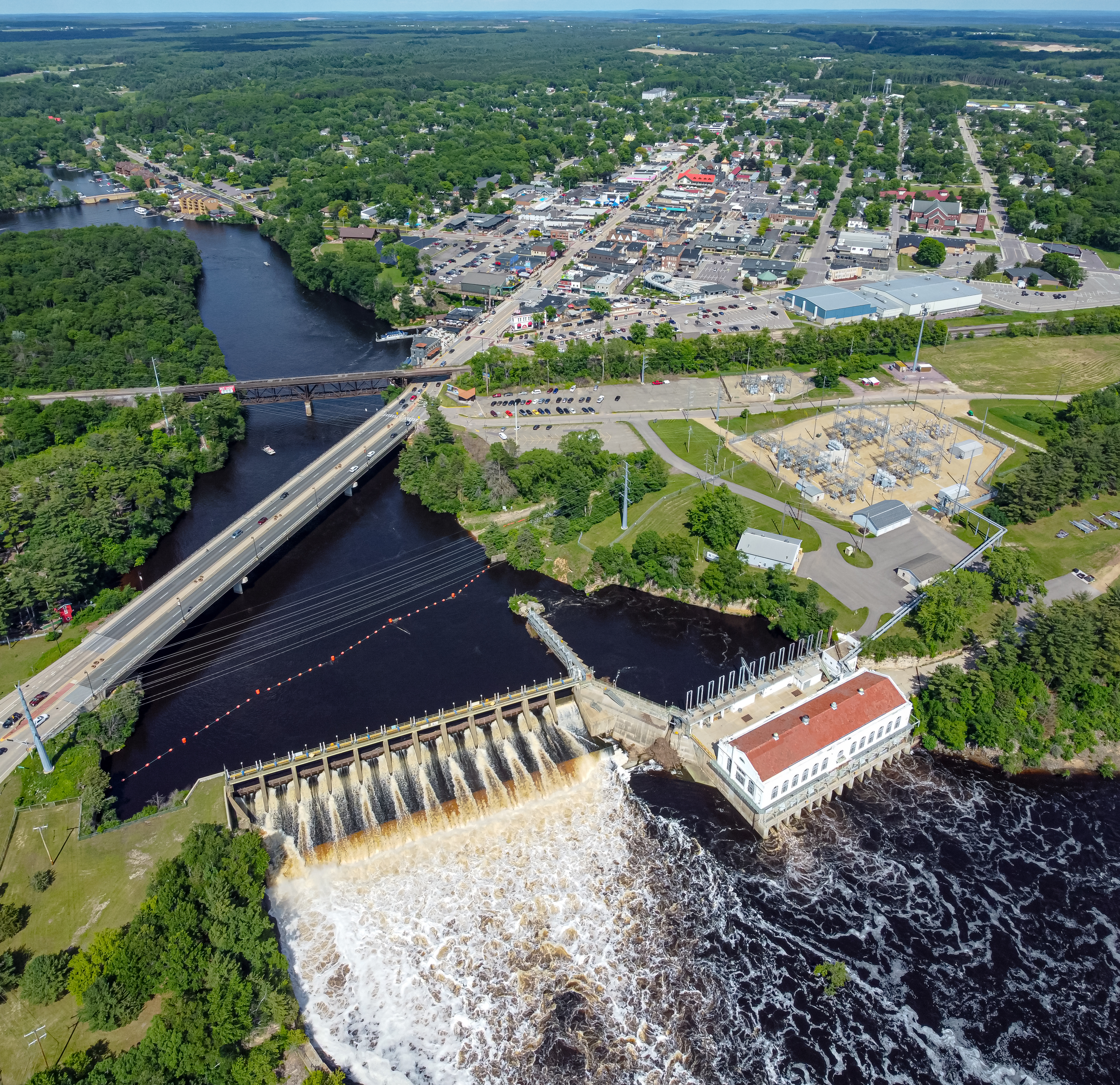
- Kilbourn Dam and downtown Wisconsin Dells

- Logo
- Nicknames: The Dells, The Waterpark Capital of the World
- Location of Wisconsin Dells in Wisconsin

- Location within Wisconsin Location within the United States
- Coordinates: 43.6374°N 89.7788°W
- Country: United States
- State: Wisconsin
- Counties: Columbia; Sauk; Adams; Juneau
- Founded: 1857
- Renamed: 1931

Government
  - Type: Mayor–council
  - Mayor: Edward Wojnicz

Area
  - Total: 8.18 sq mi (21.19 km^{2})
  - Land: 7.8 sq mi (20.3 km^{2})
  - Water: 0.34 sq mi (0.89 km^{2})
- Elevation: 909 ft (277 m)

Population (2020)
  - Total: 2,942
  - Density: 375/sq mi (144.9/km^{2})
- Time zone: UTC−6 (Central)
  - Summer (DST): UTC−5 (Central)
- ZIP Code: 53965
- Area code: 608
- FIPS code: 55-88150
- GNIS feature ID: 1576900
- Website: www.citywd.org

Wisconsin Dells (formerly Kilbourn) is a city in Columbia, Sauk, Adams and Juneau counties in the U.S. state of Wisconsin. The population was 2,942 at the 2020 census. The city takes its name from the Dells of the Wisconsin River, a scenic gorge that features sandstone formations along the banks of the Wisconsin River. It is a popular Midwestern tourist destination, home to several water parks and tourist attractions. Wisconsin Dells is about 42 miles (68 km) northwest of Madison, the state's capital city.

== History ==
The natural formation of the Dells was named by Early French explorers as dalles, a rapids or narrows on a river in voyageur French. Wisconsin Dells is located on ancestral Ho-Chunk and Menominee land. The Ho-Chunk name for Wisconsin Dells is Nįįš hakiisųc, meaning "rocks close together".

According to Indian agent Joseph Montfort Street, the Sauk leader Black Hawk sought refuge with Ho-Chunks near the Dells of the Wisconsin River at the end of the Black Hawk War of 1832 before surrendering to the United States, but more recent research has argued that this was a mistranslation of the true location. The U.S. acquired the land in treaties with the Ho-Chunk nation in 1837 and with the Menominee in 1848, but Ho-Chunk people who resisted the U.S. policy of Indian removal continued to return to the area and eventually acquired small homesteads.

The city of Wisconsin Dells was founded in 1856 by the Wisconsin Hydraulic Company, a dam-building and real estate investment business. The town was originally named Kilbourn City for Byron Kilbourn, the president of the La Crosse & Milwaukee Railroad Company, which was then preparing to build a railroad across the Wisconsin River to connect Milwaukee and La Crosse, Wisconsin. The railroad's route caused great local controversy. Boosters and speculators had anticipated the river crossing two miles downriver, where they had established the town of Newport, Wisconsin, and attracted around 1,500 residents by 1855. When the railroad instead completed a slightly more northern route in 1857, Newport rapidly turned into a ghost town as its residents relocated to the site of the railroad bridge, bringing many buildings and even a church from the earlier town to reassemble in Kilbourn City.

In 1859, lumbermen destroyed the Wisconsin Hydraulic Company's new dam at Kilbourn City because it blocked the flow of timber rafts down the river. This led the company's main creditor, Byron Kilbourn, to foreclose on its property and take ownership of most of the city's real estate.

== Geography ==
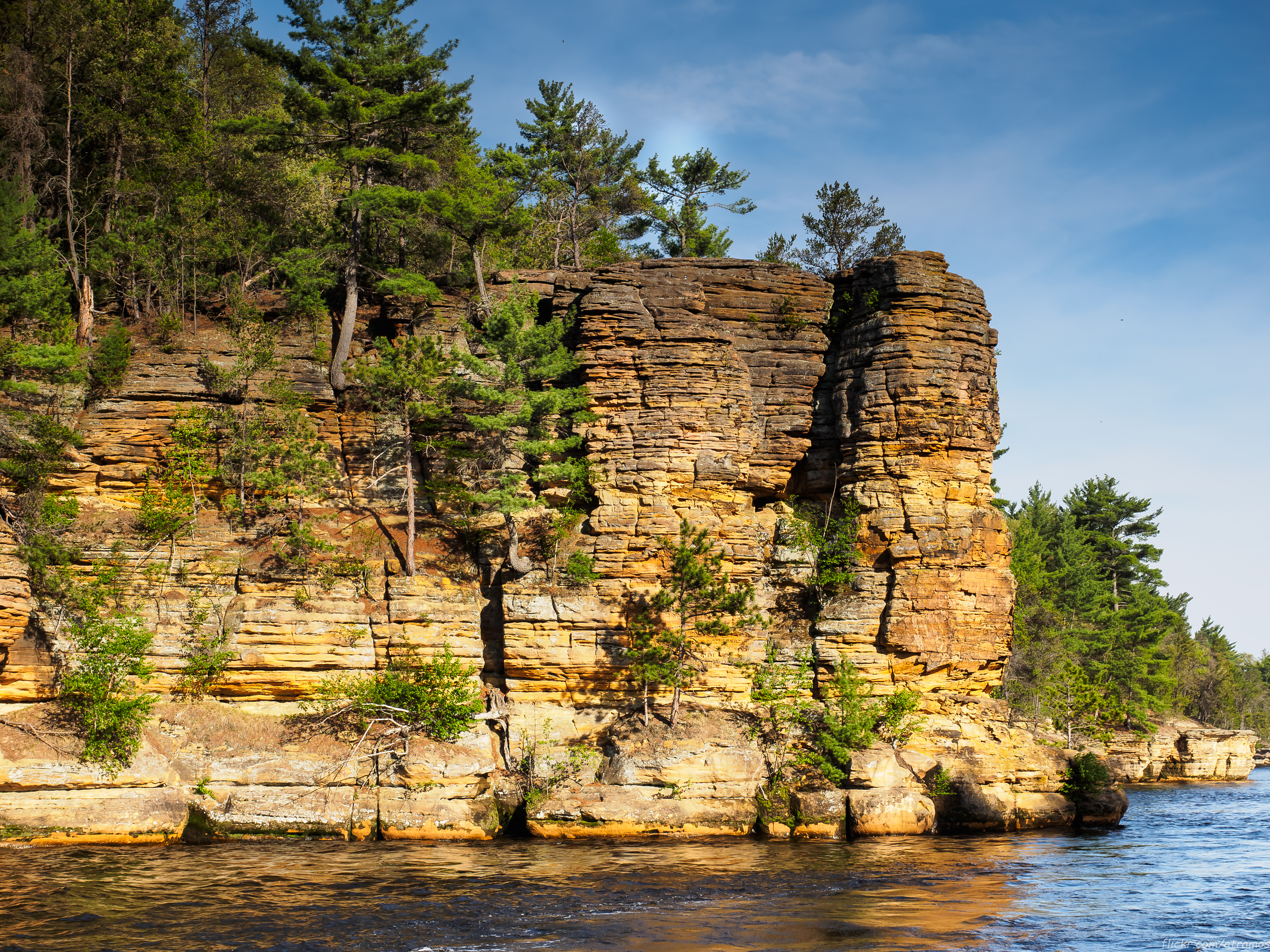
Dells of the Wisconsin River

According to the United States Census Bureau, the city has a total area of 8.18 square miles (21.19 km^{2}), of which 7.84 square miles (20.31 km^{2}) is land and 0.34 square miles (0.88 km^{2}) is water. According to the Wisconsin Department of Administration, on January 19, 2004, the city annexed land from the Town of Lyndon in Juneau County, thus expanding the city to include area in four counties. It is mostly located in Columbia County.

=== Climate ===
Wisconsin Dells has a humid continental climate.

On July 13, 1936, the temperature in Wisconsin Dells reached 114 °F (46 °C), the highest ever recorded in the state of Wisconsin.

Climate data for Wisconsin Dells, 1991–2020 normals, extremes 1922–present
Month	Jan	Feb	Mar	Apr	May	Jun	Jul	Aug	Sep	Oct	Nov	Dec	Year
Record high °F (°C)	63 (17)	68 (20)	84 (29)	91 (33)	104 (40)	102 (39)	114 (46)	104 (40)	101 (38)	90 (32)	81 (27)	67 (19)	114 (46)
Mean maximum °F (°C)	46 (8)	52 (11)	66.6 (19.2)	78.7 (25.9)	86.4 (30.2)	91.5 (33.1)	92.7 (33.7)	91.1 (32.8)	88.3 (31.3)	80.3 (26.8)	64.5 (18.1)	50.9 (10.5)	94.9 (34.9)
Mean daily maximum °F (°C)	26.4 (−3.1)	31.4 (−0.3)	43.3 (6.3)	56.8 (13.8)	69.4 (20.8)	78.9 (26.1)	82.5 (28.1)	80.5 (26.9)	73.1 (22.8)	59.6 (15.3)	44.3 (6.8)	31.9 (−0.1)	56.5 (13.6)
Daily mean °F (°C)	17.2 (−8.2)	21.2 (−6.0)	32.5 (0.3)	45 (7)	57.3 (14.1)	67.2 (19.6)	71 (22)	68.9 (20.5)	60.9 (16.1)	48.2 (9.0)	35.1 (1.7)	23.5 (−4.7)	45.7 (7.6)
Mean daily minimum °F (°C)	8 (−13)	10.9 (−11.7)	21.8 (−5.7)	33.2 (0.7)	45.2 (7.3)	55.6 (13.1)	59.6 (15.3)	57.2 (14.0)	48.6 (9.2)	36.8 (2.7)	25.9 (−3.4)	15.2 (−9.3)	34.8 (1.6)
Mean minimum °F (°C)	−16.2 (−26.8)	−11.4 (−24.1)	−1.9 (−18.8)	18.1 (−7.7)	28.9 (−1.7)	40.1 (4.5)	47.1 (8.4)	44.5 (6.9)	33.1 (0.6)	21.7 (−5.7)	8.2 (−13.2)	−7.4 (−21.9)	−20.5 (−29.2)
Record low °F (°C)	−43 (−42)	−38 (−39)	−29 (−34)	0 (−18)	21 (−6)	31 (−1)	41 (5)	32 (0)	24 (−4)	−2 (−19)	−11 (−24)	−27 (−33)	−43 (−42)
Average precipitation inches (mm)	1.32 (34)	1.38 (35)	2.28 (58)	4.08 (104)	4.38 (111)	5.11 (130)	4.04 (103)	4.22 (107)	3.84 (98)	2.82 (72)	2.23 (57)	1.77 (45)	37.47 (954)
Average snowfall inches (cm)	11.5 (29)	10.2 (26)	5.9 (15)	2 (5.1)	0 (0)	0 (0)	0 (0)	0 (0)	0 (0)	0.4 (1.0)	2 (5.1)	8.7 (22)	40.7 (103.2)
Average precipitation days (≥ 0.01 in)	7.3	6.7	8	10.8	12	11.2	9.4	9.5	9.4	9.8	8.1	9	111.2
Average snowy days (≥ 0.1 in)	6.6	5.8	3.1	1.2	0	0	0	0	0	0.2	1.8	5.7	24.4
Source 1: NOAA
Source 2: National Weather Service

== Demographics ==
Historical population
Census	Pop.	Note	%±
1870	1,114		—
1880	945		−15.2%
1890	961		1.7%
1900	1,134		18.0%
1910	1,170		3.2%
1920	1,206		3.1%
1930	1,489		23.5%
1940	1,762		18.3%
1950	1,957		11.1%
1960	2,105		7.6%
1970	2,401		14.1%
1980	2,521		5.0%
1990	2,393		−5.1%
2000	2,418		1.0%
2010	2,678		10.8%
2020	2,942		9.9%
U.S. Decennial Census

Because it straddles multiple counties, Wisconsin Dells is part of several core-based statistical areas (CBSAs). The Columbia County portion of the city is part of the Madison Metropolitan Statistical Area, while the Sauk County portion is part of the Baraboo Micropolitan Statistical Area. The Adams and Juneau county portions are not part of any metropolitan or micropolitan area.

=== 2020 census ===
As of the census of 2020, the population was 2,942. The population density was 375.3 inhabitants per square mile (144.9/km^{2}). There were 1,512 housing units at an average density of 192.9 per square mile (74.5/km^{2}). The racial makeup of the city was 85.2% White, 2.9% Black or African American, 1.3% Native American, 0.4% Asian, 5.6% from other races, and 4.5% from two or more races. Ethnically, the population was 12.4% Hispanic or Latino of any race.

Of the 2020 total population of 2,942, the population by county was:

- Adams County: 105
- Columbia County: 2449
- Juneau County: 4
- Sauk County: 384

=== 2010 census ===
As of the census of 2010, there were 2,678 people, 1,148 households, and 659 families residing in the city. The population density was 363.9 inhabitants per square mile (140.5/km^{2}). There were 1,485 housing units at an average density of 201.8 per square mile (77.9/km^{2}). The racial makeup of the city was 91.5% White, 0.7% African American, 1.8% Native American, 0.8% Asian, 0.1% Pacific Islander, 3.3% from other races, and 1.8% from two or more races. Hispanic or Latino people of any race were 7.4% of the population.

There were 1,148 households, of which 27.4% had children under the age of 18 living with them, 40.9% were married couples living together, 10.3% had a female householder with no husband present, 6.3% had a male householder with no wife present, and 42.6% were non-families. 33.9% of all households were made up of individuals, and 12.8% had someone living alone who was 65 years of age or older. The average household size was 2.26 and the average family size was 2.87.

The median age in the city was 40.3 years. 20.6% of residents were under the age of 18; 9.5% were between the ages of 18 and 24; 25.4% were from 25 to 44; 26.6% were from 45 to 64; and 17.7% were 65 years of age or older. The gender makeup of the city was 49.6% male and 50.4% female.

Of the 2010 total population of 2,678, the population by county was:

- Adams County: 61
- Columbia County: 2,440
- Juneau County: 2
- Sauk County: 175

=== 2000 census ===
As of the census of 2000, there were 2,418 people, 1,019 households, and 609 families residing in the city. The population density was 583.1 people per square mile (225.1 people/km^{2}). There were 1,178 housing units at an average density of 284.1 per square mile (109.7/km^{2}). The racial makeup of the city was 97.56% White, 0.37% African American, 0.87% Native American, 0.25% Asian, 0.33% from other races, and 0.62% from two or more races. Hispanic or Latino people of any race were 1.7% of the population.

There were 1,019 households, out of which 26.7% had children under the age of 18 living with them, 45.5% were married couples living together, 10.2% had a female householder with no husband present, and 40.2% were non-families. 34.6% of all households were made up of individuals, and 15.4% had someone living alone who was 65 years of age or older. The average household size was 2.28 and the average family size was 2.93.

In the city, the population was spread out, with 22% under the age of 18, 7.8% from 18 to 24, 27.3% from 25 to 44, 23.6% from 45 to 64, and 19.3% who were 65 years of age or older. The median age was 41 years. For every 100 females, there were 87.9 males. For every 100 females aged 18 and over, there were 86.7 males.

The median income for a household in the city was $35,699, and the median income for a family was $46,304. Males had a median income of $29,830 versus $22,553 for females. The per capita income for the city was $23,447. About 4.0% of families and 7.5% of the population were below the poverty line, including 9.7% of those under age 18 and 3% of those age 65 or over.

== Economy ==
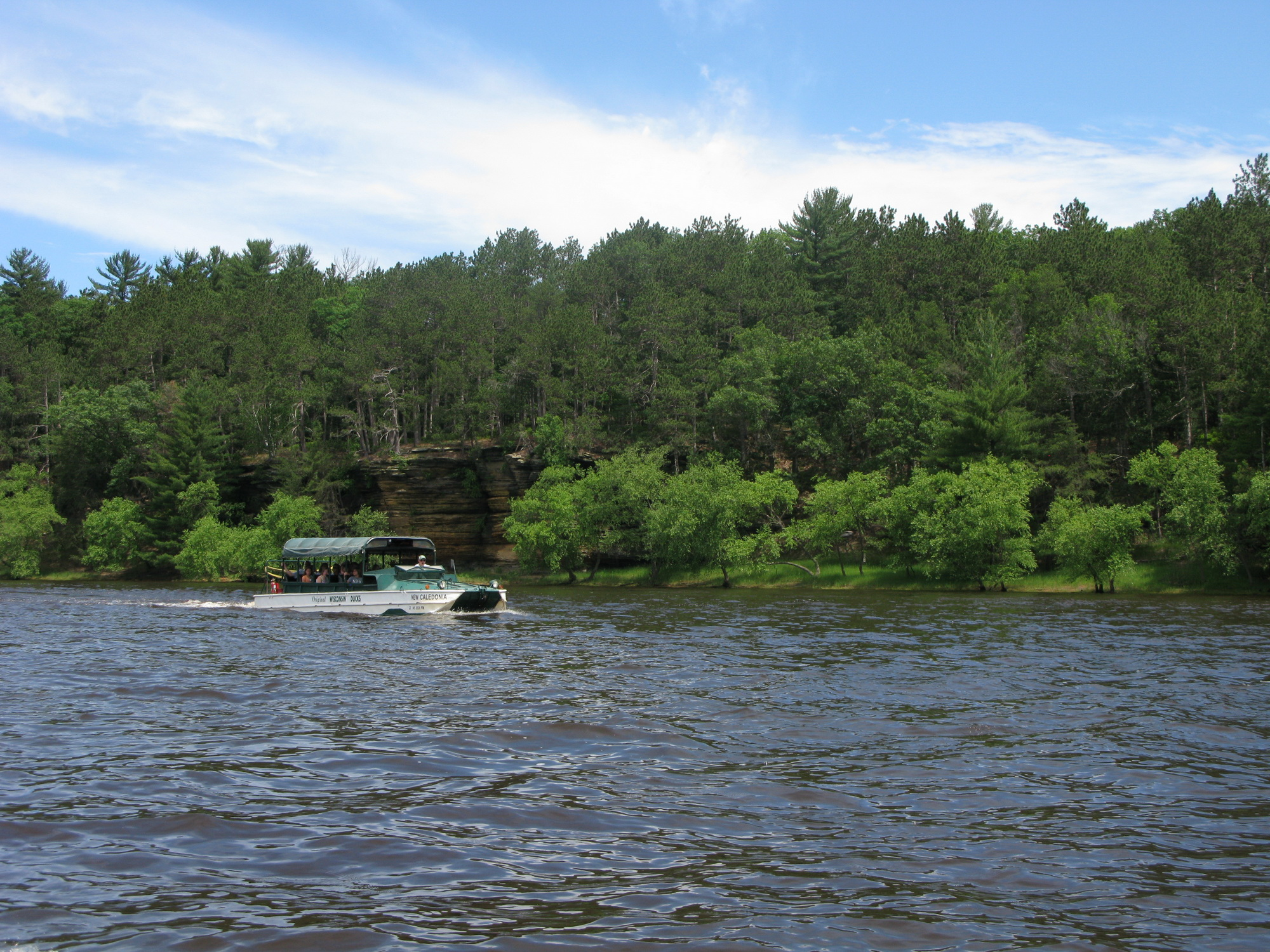
Amphibious DUKW vehicle in Wisconsin Dells

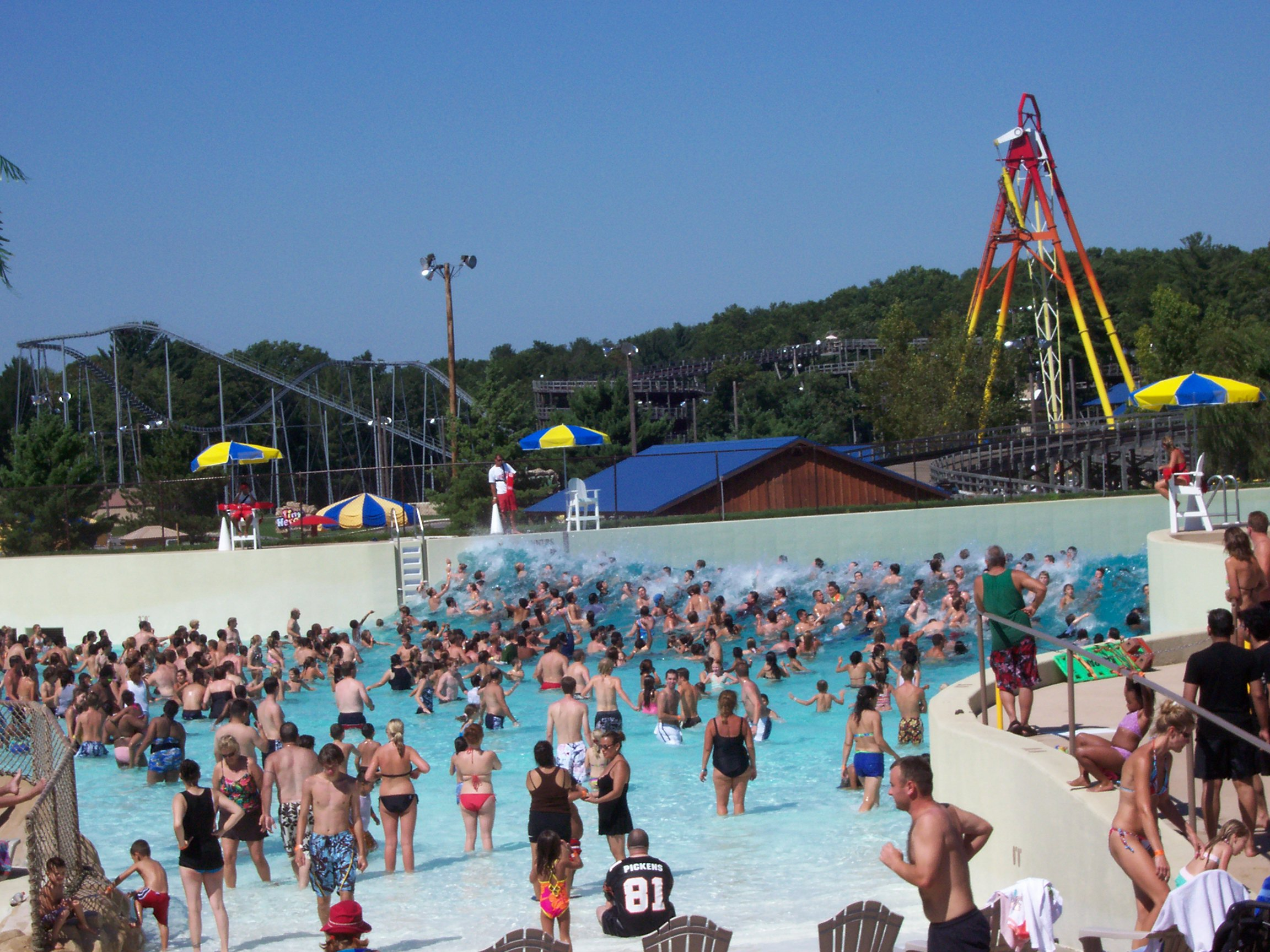
Poseidons Rage surf pool at Mt. Olympus Water & Theme Park

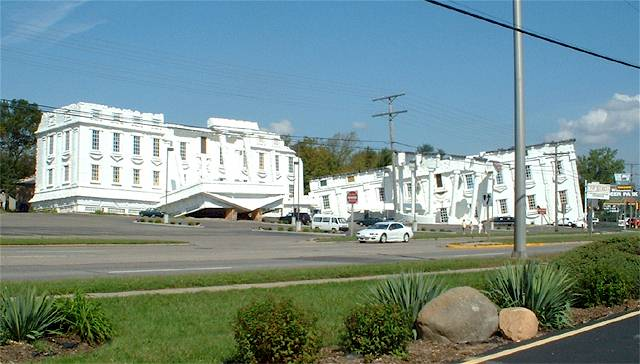
"Top Secret", an upside-down White House

Tourism is the major contributor to the economy of Wisconsin Dells. The Dells area has many indoor and outdoor waterparks, proclaiming itself the "Waterpark Capital of the World". Other attractions include boat tours, zip-lining, golf courses, mini golf, go-kart tracks, water sports, horseback riding, a water ski show known as the Tommy Bartlett's Thrill Show (now closed), museums, amusement parks, Wizard Quest, and a casino. Most attractions are located on the Strip, otherwise known as the Wisconsin Dells Parkway. Accommodations range from economical motels to RV parks to chain hotels to themed resorts featuring indoor and outdoor waterparks and other amenities.

Amphibious DUKW vehicles called "ducks" began offering duck tours to tourists in Wisconsin Dells in 1946. The tours visit wilderness trails and enter nearby Lake Delton and the Wisconsin River. One company, Original Wisconsin Ducks, has more than 90 vehicles and is the largest operator of duck tours in the United States.

Since the late 1970s, the Dells area (Wisconsin Dells and the neighboring village of Lake Delton) has become the home of large water parks. Noah's Ark Waterpark opened in Lake Delton in 1979. Other outdoor amusement and water parks followed, featuring water slides, mini golf, roller coasters, go-karts, and other attractions. The Polynesian Resort Hotel opened the United States' and the Dells area's first indoor waterpark in 1994. Since then, the number of combination resort/indoor waterparks in the Wisconsin Dells area has increased. Among these are the Mt. Olympus Water & Theme Park, Wilderness Territory, Kalahari Resort, Chula Vista Resort, and Atlantis Resort.

The Tanger Outlet Center, a shopping mall, opened in 2006 on the site of the defunct Wisconsin Dells Greyhound Park, which opened in May 1990 but closed in 1996 due to heavy competition from the nearby Ho-Chunk Gaming Wisconsin Dells Bingo/Casino.

=== Tourism ===
Kilbourn City quickly became a popular travel destination in the Midwest due to the scenery of the Dells of the Wisconsin River and the ready railroad access. In 1856, entrepreneur Leroy Gates began taking tourists on boat tours of the Wisconsin Dells and promoting the town to railroad travelers. These tours were given using wooden rowboats until 1873 when two excursion steamers, the Modocawanda and the Dell Queen launched. Gates also established a photography studio in the city, which he sold to photographer H. H. Bennett in 1865. Over the following decades, Bennett took many photos of the sandstone formations in the dells, including stereoscopic views, as well as portraits of local Ho-Chunk people in Indian costume. Prints of Bennett's photographs were distributed across the United States and played a large role in promoting Kilbourn City as an exotic destination for sightseers. The H. H. Bennett Studio is now a historic site operated by the Wisconsin Historical Society.

In 1909, the Kilbourn Dam was completed across the Wisconsin River to generate hydroelectricity, over the protests of people such as H. H. Bennett, separating the Dells into the Upper and Lower Dells. It is now owned by Alliant Energy.

In 1928 Mr. Clinton Berry established Berry's Dells airport. It occupied sixty acres and was designated on government maps as beacon No. 19. Berry built the airport to carry visitors to the Dells from the surrounding metropolitan areas.

Kilbourn City shortened its name to "Kilbourn" in 1895 and then changed its name to Wisconsin Dells in 1931, identifying itself with the famous natural landscape of the Dells of the Wisconsin River.

In 1952, a new traveling performance from Chicago called "Tommy Bartlett's Thrill Show" came to Lake Delton on its second stop. Following the show's huge success in the city, its owner, Tommy Bartlett, chose to keep the performance permanently in Wisconsin Dells. To promote the show, Bartlett gave away bumper stickers advertising his thrill show and the city, effectively spreading word about the area across the nation. That tourist attraction closed permanently in 2020.

Soon more attractions followed to serve the ever-increasing tourists, along with many hotels, shops, and restaurants. Today, a large number of water parks are central to the local economy.

The village of Lake Delton, which abuts Wisconsin Dells to the south, gradually became popular as the Dells attractions spread out. The Wonder Spot, which used optical illusions found in "gravity hills" to make water appear to flow backwards, people appear to stand at odd angles, and chairs to balance on two legs, was founded in Lake Delton in 1952 and remained open until 2006.

== Education ==
It is in the Wisconsin Dells School District, which operates Wisconsin Dells High School.

== Media ==
Wisconsin Dells is served by a local newspaper, Wisconsin Dells Events, and 2 local radio stations, WNNO and WDLS. The Wisconsin Dells Events is published by Capital Newspapers, which publishes multiple newspapers in south central Wisconsin. WNNO-FM broadcasts at 106.9 MHz and covers an area 20 miles in radius centered on Wisconsin Dells. WDLS broadcasts on 900 AM.

== Transportation ==
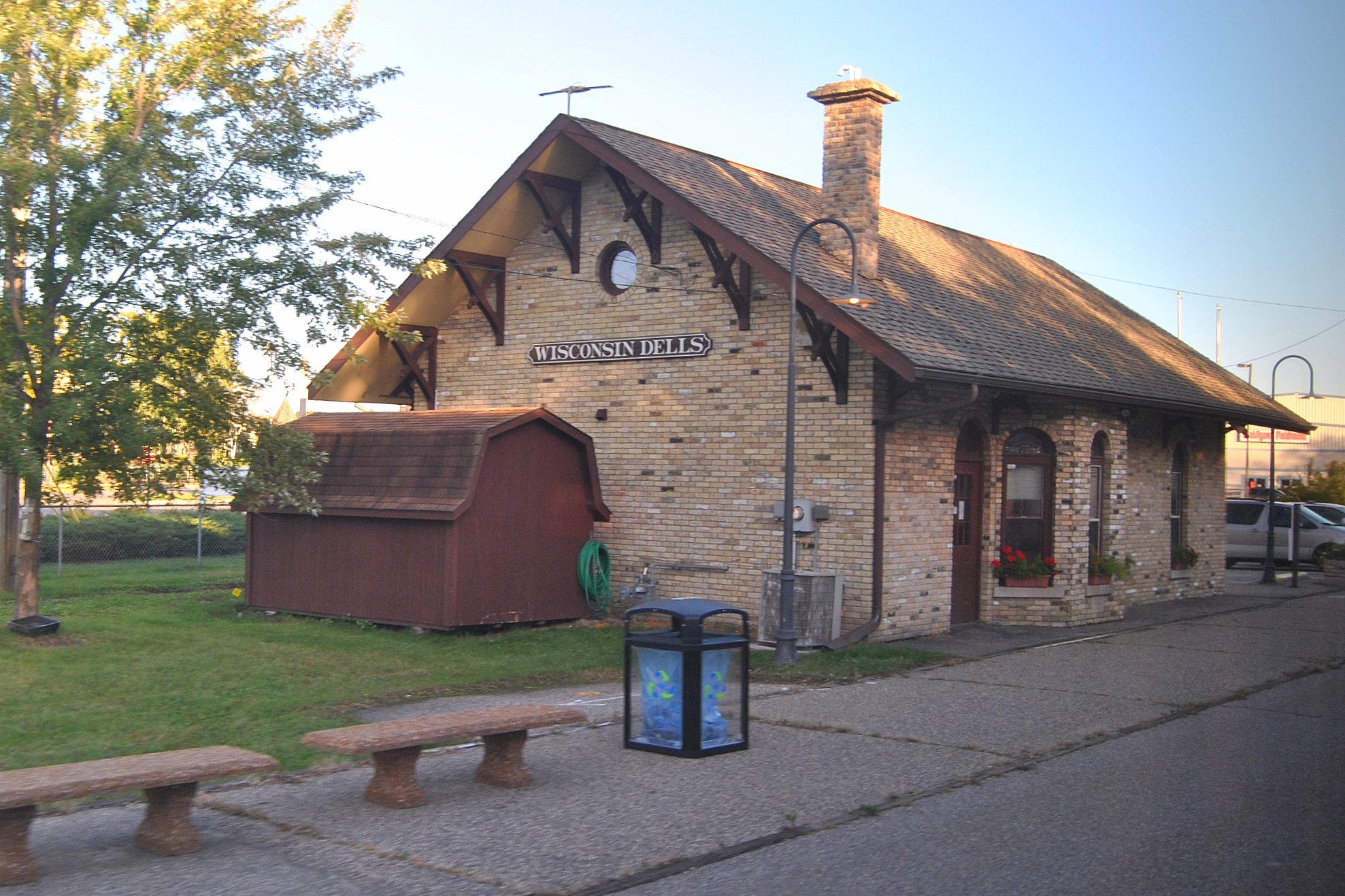
Wisconsin Dells station

Greyhound Lines provides intrastate and interstate bus service to Wisconsin Dells on its Chicago - Milwaukee - Madison - Minneapolis route.

The Empire Builder and Borealis, operated by Amtrak, provide daily rail service from the Wisconsin Dells station to Chicago, Saint Paul, Portland, or Seattle. The station was built in the 1980s in the style of the original station. Freight railroad service is provided by the Canadian Pacific Kansas City Railroad under the Soo Line Railroad umbrella.

== Notable people ==
- Belle Boyd, Confederate spy
- Lynn N. Coapman, Wisconsin state representative
- Jack Flannery, CORR and SODA driver
- Thomas Gillespie, Wisconsin state representative
- Michael Griffin, U.S. representative
- Alanson Holly, Wisconsin state representative and newspaper editor
- Frank Kreyer, NASCAR driver
- G. M. Marshall, Wisconsin state representative
- Jack B. Olson, lieutenant governor of Wisconsin, businessman, and U.S. diplomat
- James H. Quinn, Minnesota Supreme Court justice
- Robert Schulz, jazz cornetist
- Yellow Thunder, Ho-Chunk chief

== Sister city ==
Wisconsin Dells has one sister city.

- Iwaizumi-Cho (Japan) since 1990

== See also ==
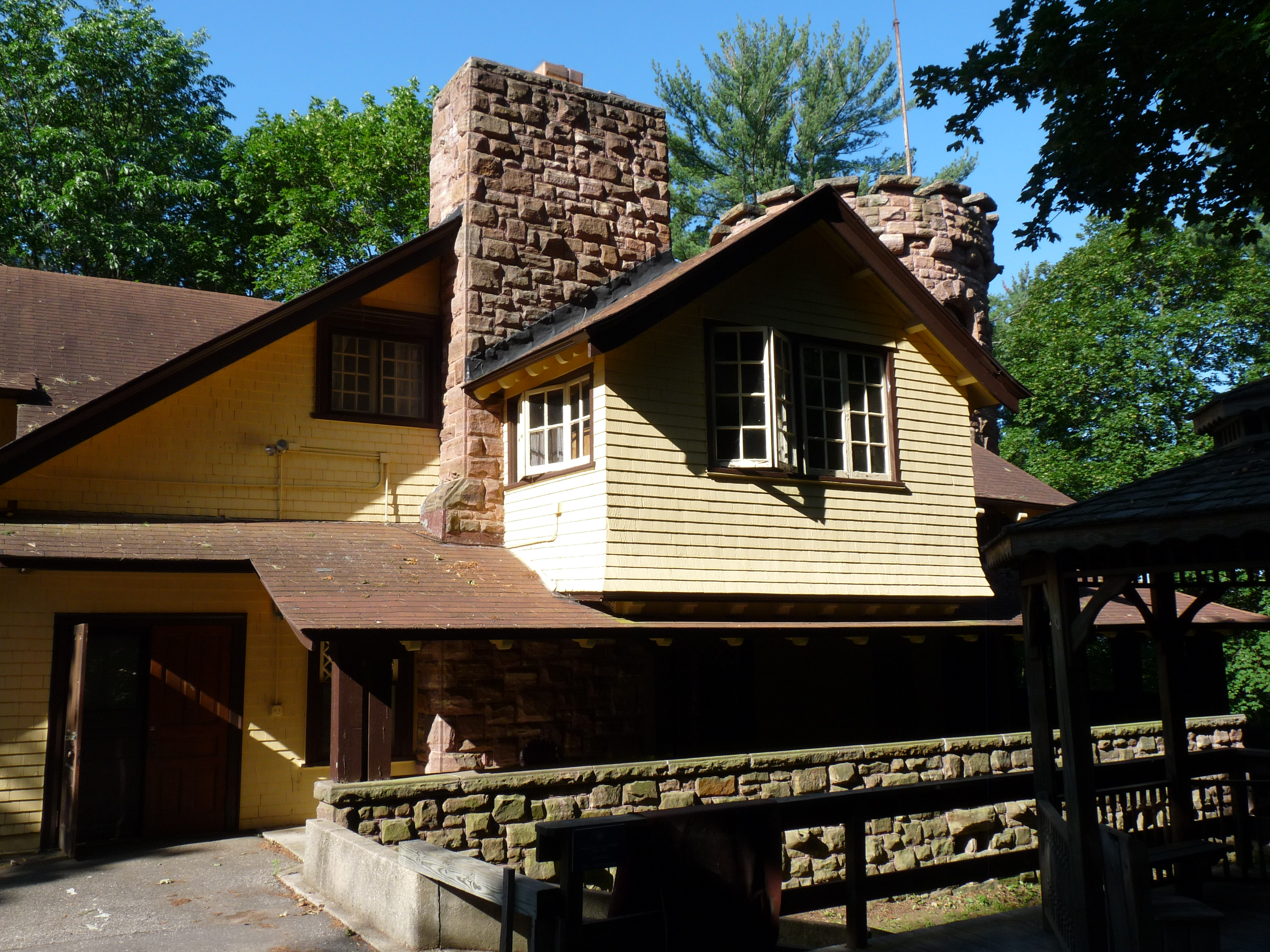
Wawbeek-Horace A.J. Upham House

- National Register of Historic Places listings in Wisconsin
