= Tommy Bartlett Show =

Tourist attraction in Wisconsin

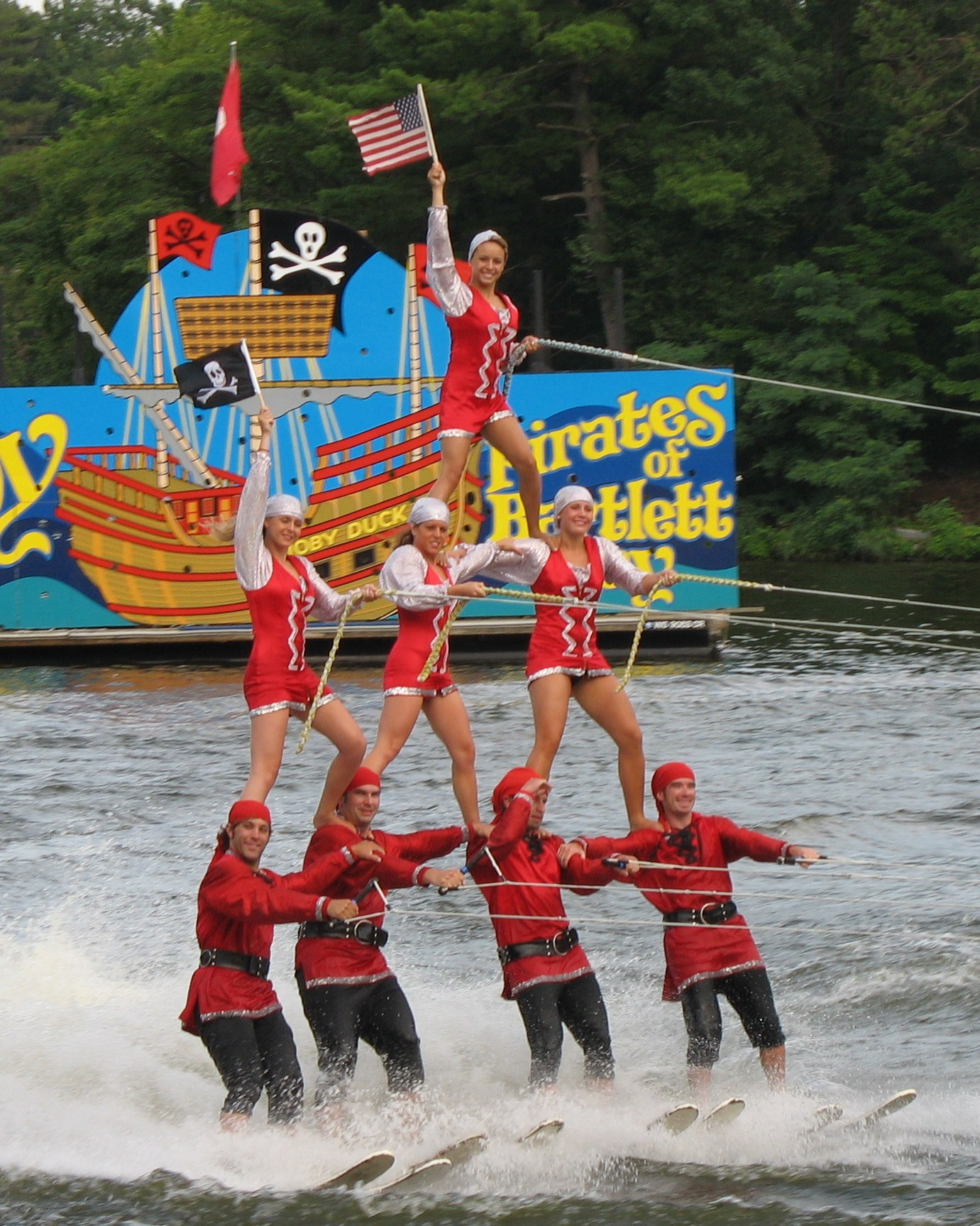
Water skiers in 2007

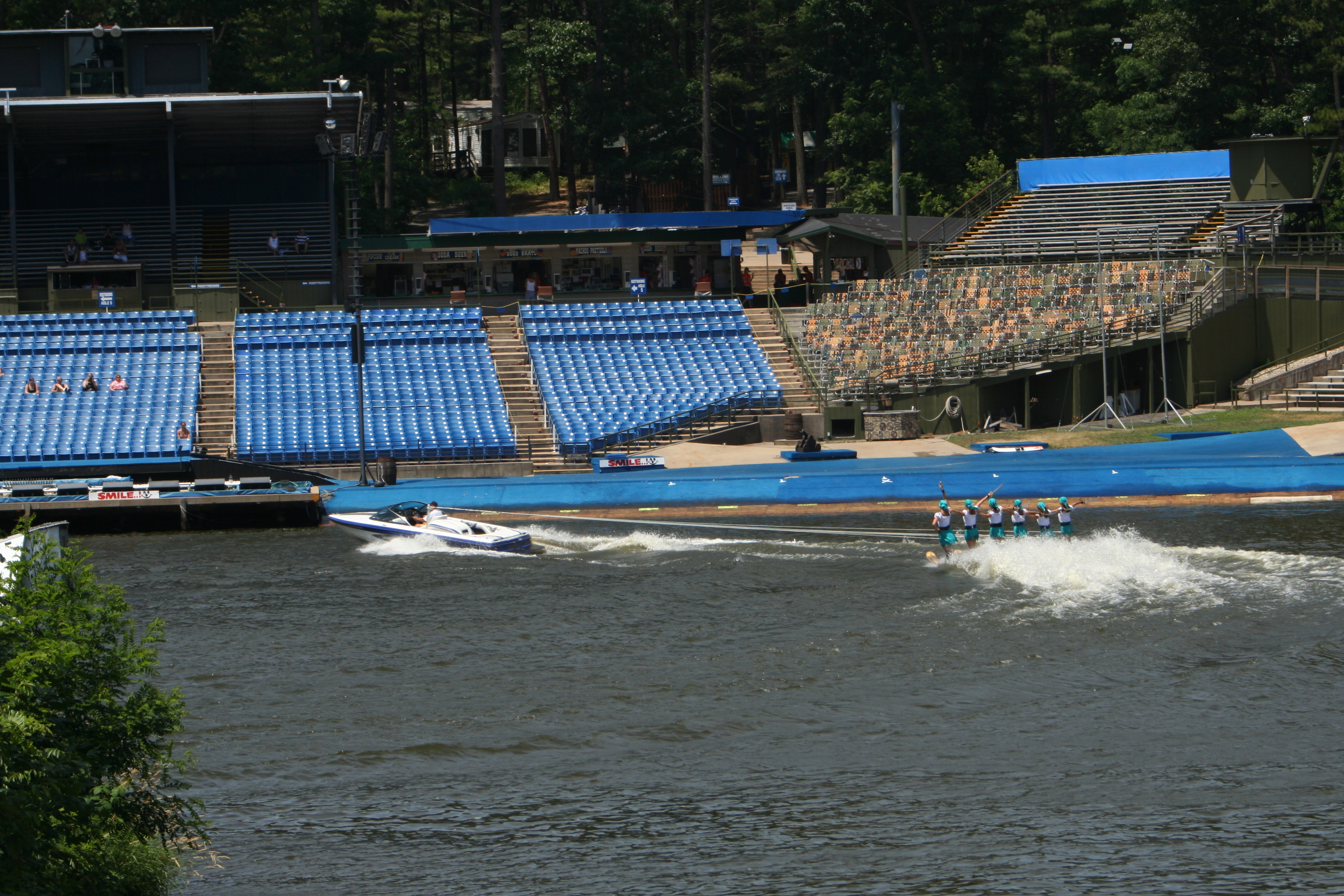
Grandstands in 2007

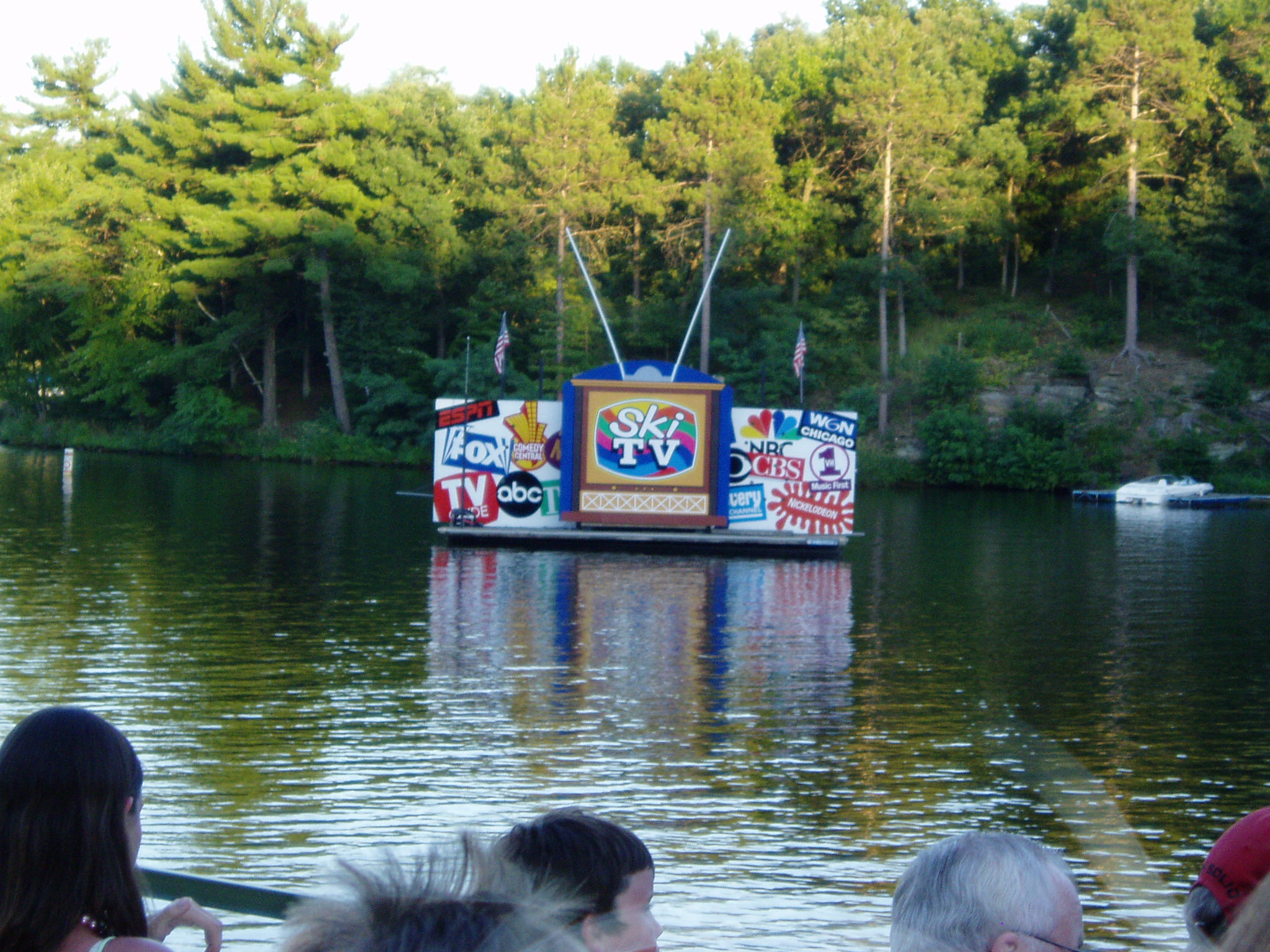
Lake Delton

The Tommy Bartlett Show, previously known as the Tommy Bartlett's Water Ski & Jumping Boat Thrill Show, was a popular tourist attraction in Wisconsin Dells, Wisconsin. The show was created in 1952 by Wisconsin showman Tommy Bartlett as a traveling group of entertainers, based in Chicago, Illinois. After changing its base of operations to Wisconsin Dells, the performers continued to tour, performing at World's Fairs and U.S.O. shows. According to the show's official website, over 20 million spectators have seen the show since its creation.

The Wisconsin Dells show was performed between late May and early September on Lake Delton. In keeping with the tourist-centered economy of Wisconsin Dells, the show operates regardless of rain, and was generally canceled only when weather is dangerous, rather than simply inclement. Despite the fact that the show took place entirely on the lake, Bartlett himself apparently only waterskiied once, on his 70th birthday, 32 years after the show's creation.

In 1978, Tommy Bartlett named Thomas Diehl president of Tommy Bartlett, Inc. and sold him a 25% stake in the company. Diehl was the president, general manager, and co-owner of Tommy Bartlett, Inc. up until his death in 2024. He had joined the Bartlett organization in 1967, at the recommendation of NFL quarterback Joe Namath.

On September 16, 2020 the show announced it would permanently close due to financial losses from the COVID-19 pandemic. On May 6, 2025, the business, which had been looking for a new owner since its closure, was sold to Ripley's Believe It or Not!.

== Suspension after the Lake Delton draining in 2008 ==
On June 7, 2008, the Bartlett show closed when Lake Delton, the body of water where the show takes place, flooded after torrential rains, and two days later, breached the embankment surrounding it, draining the lake almost completely, in particular the area of the show's grandstand.

The show reopened on Thursday, June 12, but without its famous water skiers. They, like Lake Delton, were gone for the rest of the 2008 season.

Even with the land show that was put in place, 2008 show numbers were down almost 90%. The show was improvised with a beached island and by pulling legends like "Sound Effects Guy" Wes Harrison out of retirement.

Another setback occurred the first week of July, 2008. Many of Tommy Bartlett's employees live in trailers on company premises, as most are college students there for summer employment. On Wednesday, July 8, a fire broke out in one of the trailers, damaging four mobile homes on the premises, and causing $100,000 worth of damage. Tom Diehl was quoted as saying, "another emotional setback for everyone".
