= Emergency Watershed Protection Program =

Program administered by the US Natural Resources Conservation Service

The Emergency Watershed Protection (EWP) Program is a program administered by the Natural Resources Conservation Service to respond to floods, fires, windstorms and other types of natural disasters. Types of work this program funds include: removing debris; reshaping and protecting eroded banks; correcting damaged drainage facilities; repairing levees and other water conveyance structures; and purchasing flood plain easements. For construction activities, it provides up to 75% of the project cost. It is almost always funded in supplemental appropriations that provide federal assistance to deal with a natural disaster. The EWP's activities are sponsored by a city, county, town, conservation district, or any federally-recognized Native American tribe or tribal organization before EWP can come in with their expertise to assist a region that has experienced an emergency.

Over 430 sites in Puerto Rico and the US Virgin Islands had to be immediately addressed by EWP after Hurricane Maria struck on September 20, 2017.

== See also ==
- Emergency Wetlands Reserve Program
