= Lake Delton, Wisconsin =

- Village
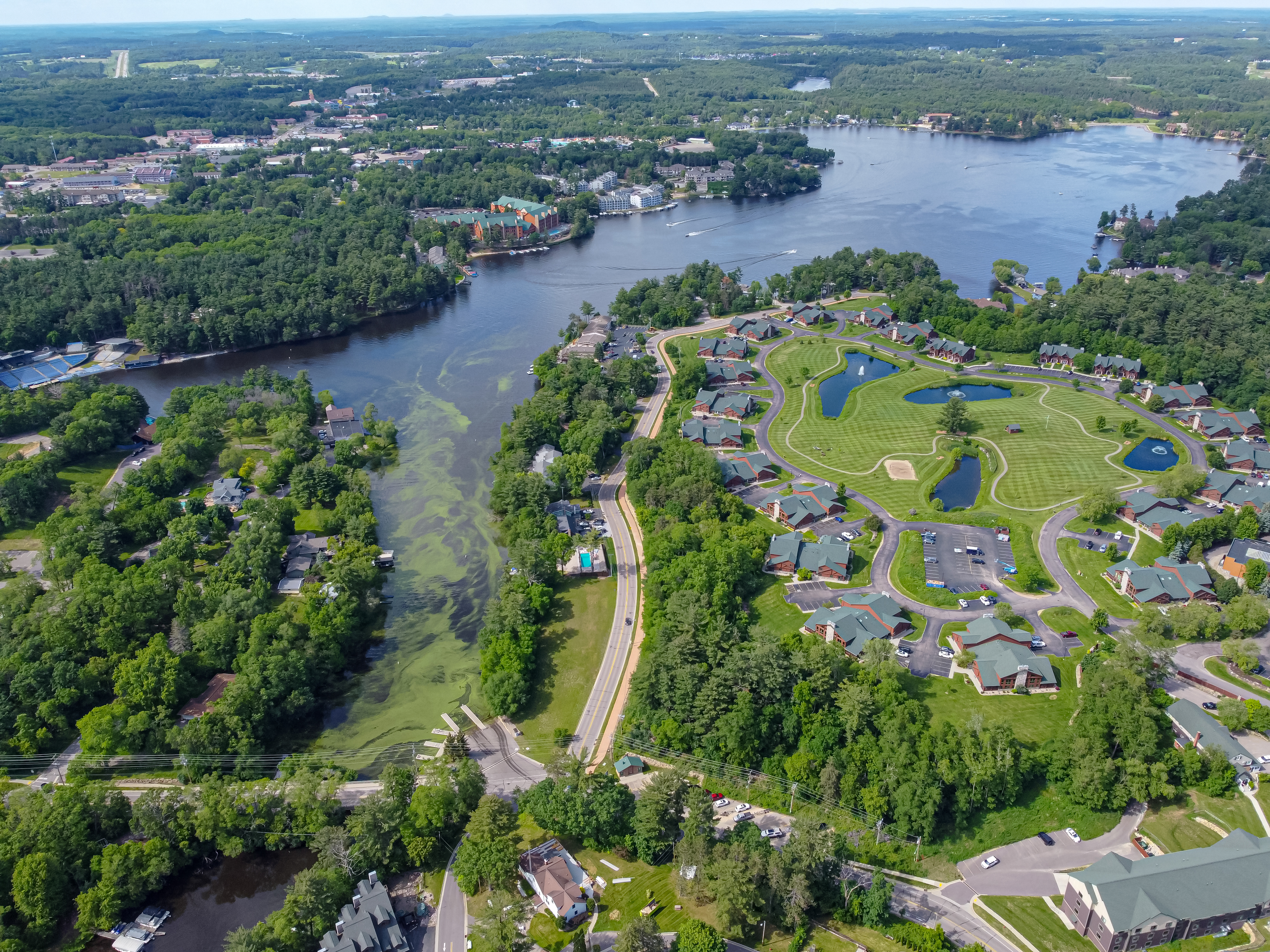
- Lake Delton

- Location of Lake Delton in Sauk County, Wisconsin.
- Coordinates: 43°35′48″N 89°47′16″W
- Country: United States
- State: Wisconsin
- County: Sauk

Area
  - Total: 8.12 sq mi (21.04 km^{2})
  - Land: 7.49 sq mi (19.39 km^{2})
  - Water: 0.64 sq mi (1.65 km^{2})
- Elevation: 915 ft (279 m)

Population (2020)
  - Total: 3,501
  - Density: 467/sq mi (180.5/km^{2})
- Time zone: UTC-6 (Central (CST))
  - Summer (DST): UTC-5 (CDT)
- ZIP code: 53940
- Area code: 608
- FIPS code: 55-41300
- GNIS feature ID: 1567728
- Website: www.lakedeltonwi.gov

Lake Delton is a village in Sauk County, Wisconsin, United States. The population was 3,501 at the 2020 census. Located on the Wisconsin River and Lake Delton reservoir, the village forms a resort area and tourism destination along with nearby Wisconsin Dells. Lake Delton is included in the Baraboo micropolitan area about 40 miles (64 km) northwest of the state capital, Madison.

== History ==
The village of Lake Delton was originally named Norris for Edward Norris, the surveyor of the village, in 1850. The Village changed its name to Delton, but changed again in 1926 to Mirror Lake to avoid a conflict with the Town of Delton in that area. The name Lake Delton was taken after the construction of the Dell Creek dam creating a reservoir also known as Lake Delton. The village was incorporated in 1954.

On June 9, 2008, Lake Delton, the approximately 267-acre (1.08 km^{2}) dammed artificial lake adjacent to the village, overflowed its banks, washing away four homes and a portion of Old Newport Road (County Highway "A") while nearly emptying the lake basin into the Wisconsin River following several days of torrential rains.

== Geography ==
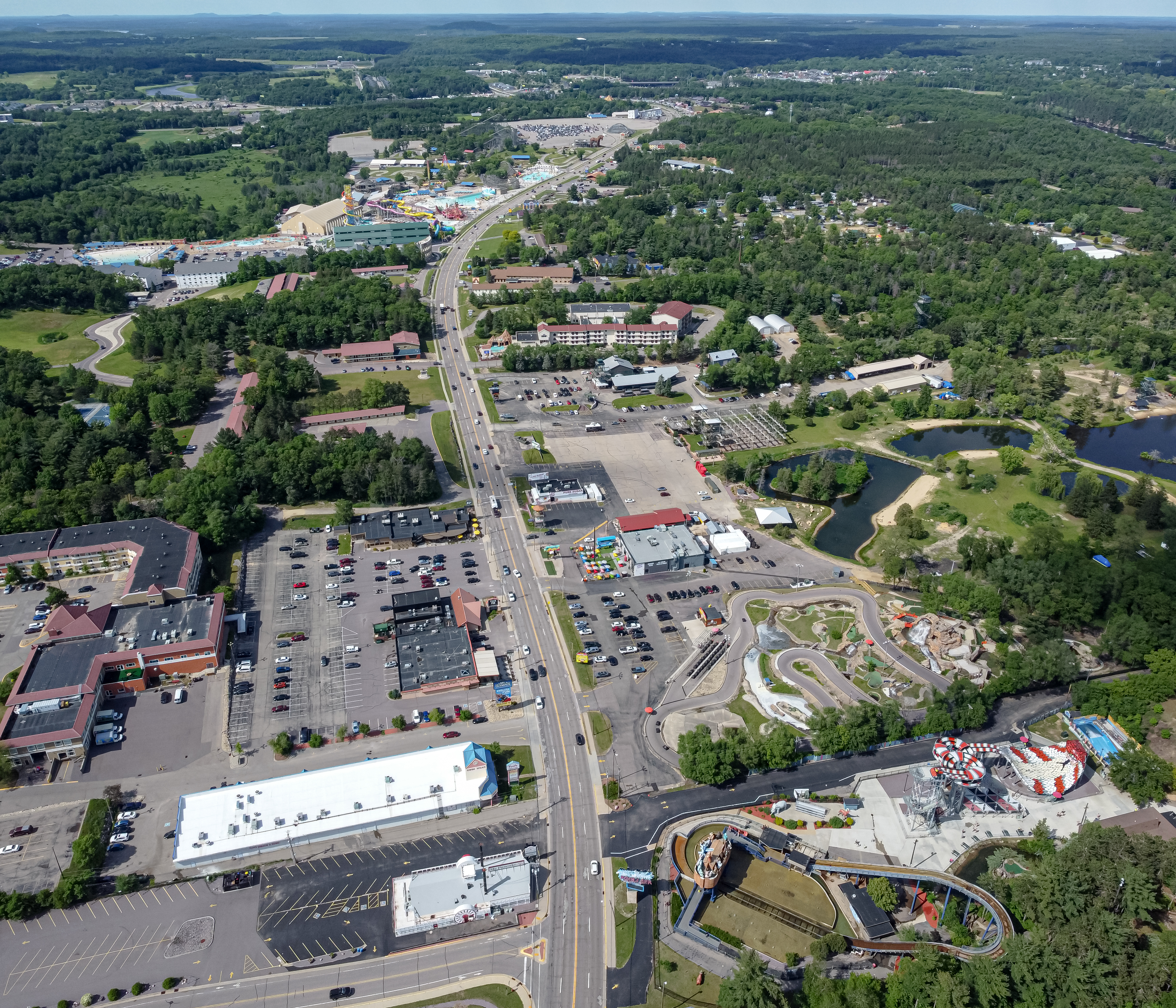
Wisconsin Dells Parkway on US-12/Wis-23

Lake Delton is located at 43°35′48″N 89°47′16″W (43.596757, -89.787646).

According to the United States Census Bureau, the village has a total area of 8.12 square miles (21.03 km^{2}), of which 7.49 square miles (19.40 km^{2}) is land and 0.64 square miles (1.66 km^{2}) is water.

=== Climate ===
Lake Delton

Climate chart (precipitation, max. and min. temperature)
| J | F | M | A | M | J | J | A | S | O | N | D |
| 63 −9 −13 | 67 −6 −14 | 84 4 −7 | 161 18 1 | 147 21 9 | 193 26 15 | 80 27 17 | 97 25 18 | 81 21 13 | 104 15 5 | 63 6 −1 | 63 −5 −9 |
- █ Average max. and min. temperatures in °C
- █ Precipitation totals in mm
Imperial conversion
| J | F | M | A | M | J | J | A | S | O | N | D |
| 2.5 16 9 | 2.6 21 7 | 3.3 39 19 | 6.3 64 34 | 5.8 70 48 | 7.6 79 59 | 3.1 81 63 | 3.8 77 64 | 3.2 70 55 | 4.1 59 41 | 2.5 43 30 | 2.5 23 16 |
- █ Average max. and min. temperatures in °F
- █ Precipitation totals in inches

== Demographics ==
Historical population
| Census | Pop. | Note | %± |
|---|---|---|---|
| 1960 | 714 | | — |
| 1970 | 1,059 | | 48.3% |
| 1980 | 1,158 | | 9.3% |
| 1990 | 1,470 | | 26.9% |
| 2000 | 1,982 | | 34.8% |
| 2010 | 2,914 | | 47.0% |
| 2020 | 3,501 | | 20.1% |
U.S. Decennial Census

=== 2020 census ===
As of the census of 2020, the population was 3,501. The population density was 467.5 inhabitants per square mile (180.5/km^{2}). There were 2,217 housing units at an average density of 296.1 per square mile (114.3/km^{2}). The racial makeup of the village was 69.3% White, 3.1% Black or African American, 2.2% Native American, 1.5% Asian, 0.1% Pacific Islander, 15.3% from other races, and 8.5% from two or more races. Ethnically, the population was 24.1% Hispanic or Latino of any race.

=== 2010 census ===
As of the census of 2010, there were 2,914 people, 1,269 households, and 653 families living in the village. The population density was 415.7 inhabitants per square mile (160.5/km^{2}). There were 2,343 housing units at an average density of 334.2 per square mile (129.0/km^{2}). The racial makeup of the village was 87.3% White, 0.7% African American, 2.4% Native American, 2.9% Asian, 5.4% from other races, and 1.3% from two or more races. Hispanic or Latino of any race were 15.3% of the population.

There were 1,269 households, of which 21.4% had children under the age of 18 living with them, 37.9% were married couples living together, 8.7% had a female householder with no husband present, 4.8% had a male householder with no wife present, and 48.5% were non-families. 35.4% of all households were made up of individuals, and 9.6% had someone living alone who was 65 years of age or older. The average household size was 2.21 and the average family size was 2.80.

The median age in the village was 36.9 years. 16.5% of residents were under the age of 18; 15% were between the ages of 18 and 24; 27% were from 25 to 44; 26.5% were from 45 to 64; and 14.9% were 65 years of age or older. The gender makeup of the village was 50.3% male and 49.7% female.

=== 2000 census ===
As of the census of 2000, there were 1,982 people, 897 households, and 525 families living in the village. The population density was 320.3 people per square mile (123.6/km^{2}). There were 1,373 housing units at an average density of 221.9 per square mile (85.6/km^{2}). The racial makeup of the village was 95.26% White, 0.10% African American, 2.57% Native American, 0.40% Asian, 0.40% from other races, and 1.26% from two or more races. Hispanic or Latino of any race were 1.66% of the population.

There were 897 households, out of which 18.4% had children under the age of 18 living with them, 46.6% were married couples living together, 9.1% had a female householder with no husband present, and 41.4% were non-families. 30.8% of all households were made up of individuals, and 10.6% had someone living alone who was 65 years of age or older. The average household size was 2.15 and the average family size was 2.67.

In the village, the population was spread out, with 16.9% under the age of 18, 8.5% from 18 to 24, 25.2% from 25 to 44, 28.6% from 45 to 64, and 20.8% who were 65 years of age or older. The median age was 45 years. For every 100 females, there were 87.0 males. For every 100 females aged 18 and over, there were 85.6 males.

The median income for a household in the village was $34,951, and the median income for a family was $40,952. Males had a median income of $31,680 versus $23,990 for females. The per capita income for the village was $19,834. About 5.4% of families and 9.9% of the population were below the poverty line, including 9.8% of those under age 18 and 9.5% of those age 65 or over.

== Tourism ==
Among the attractions at Lake Delton are the world's largest Trojan Horse (part of Mt. Olympus Water & Theme Park) as well as the world's largest (artificial) Pink Flamingo. From 1952 to 2006, Lake Delton was home to The Wonder Spot.

== Education ==
Most of the community is in the School District of Wisconsin Dells, which operates the following schools serving the community: Lake Delton Elementary School, Spring Hill Middle School, and Wisconsin Dells High School.

A small section of Lake Delton is within the Baraboo School District, which operates Baraboo High School. The Baraboo School District absorbed other school districts in 1961-1962. Prior to that time, people outside of the City of Baraboo, including those in West Baraboo, had to pay tuition to send children to Baraboo High.

== See also ==
- List of villages in Wisconsin
