= Sauk–Prairie Airport =

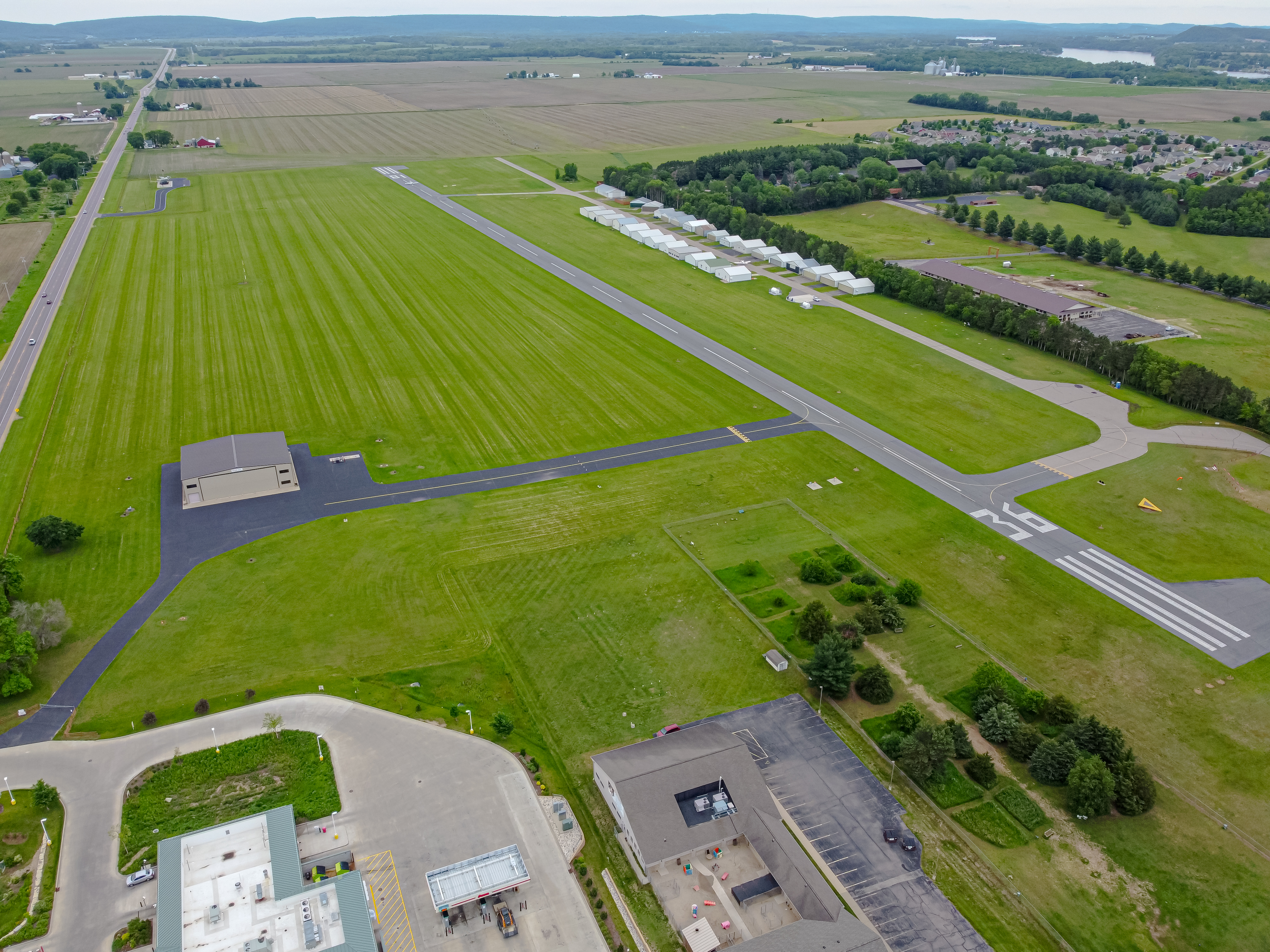
- IATA: none; ICAO: none; FAA LID: 91C

Summary
- Airport type: Public
- Owner: CFM Investments
- Operator: City of Prairie du Sac
- Serves: Prairie du Sac, Wisconsin
- Opened: January 1963
- Time zone: CST (UTC−06:00)
  - Summer (DST): CDT (UTC−05:00)
- Elevation AMSL: 832 ft / 254 m
- Coordinates: 43°17′52″N 089°45′21″W
- Website: saukprairieairport.com

Map
- Location of airport in Wisconsin 91C (the United States)

Runways
Direction	Length		Surface
Direction	ft	m	Surface
18/36	2,936	895	Asphalt

Statistics
- Aircraft operations (2023): 8,350
- Based aircraft (2024): 33
- Source: Federal Aviation Administration

Sauk–Prairie Airport (FAA LID: 91C) is a privately owned public use airport located 2 miles (3 km) west of the central business district of Prairie du Sac and 3 miles (5 km) northwest of the central business district of Sauk City, two adjacent villages in Sauk County, Wisconsin, United States. Sauk Prairie, Wisconsin, is the nickname for the two combined communities. The airport is included in the Federal Aviation Administration (FAA) National Plan of Integrated Airport Systems for 2025–2029, in which it is categorized as an unclassified general aviation facility.

Although most airports in the United States use the same three-letter location identifier for the FAA and the International Air Transport Association (IATA), this airport is assigned 91C by the FAA but has no designation from the IATA.

== Facilities and aircraft ==
Sauk–Prairie Airport covers an area of 20 acres (8 ha) at an elevation of 832 feet (254 m) above mean sea level. It has one runway: 18/36 is 2,936 by 60 feet (895 x 18 m) with an asphalt surface, it has approved GPS approaches.

For the 12-month period ending July 12, 2023, the airport had 8,350 aircraft operations, an average of 23 per day: 96% general aviation, 4% military and less than 1% air taxi.

In August 2024, there were 33 aircraft based at this airport: 29 single-engine, 1 jet, 2 helicopter and 1 glider.

== See also ==
- List of airports in Wisconsin
