= Sauk Prairie, Wisconsin =

Two villages in Wisconsin

Coordinates: 43°16′55″N 89°43′52″W

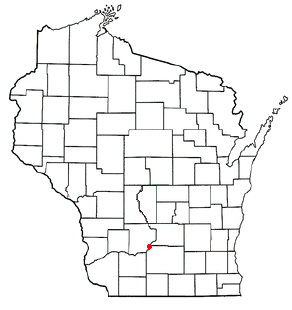
Location of Sauk Prairie (Sauk City and Prairie du Sac)

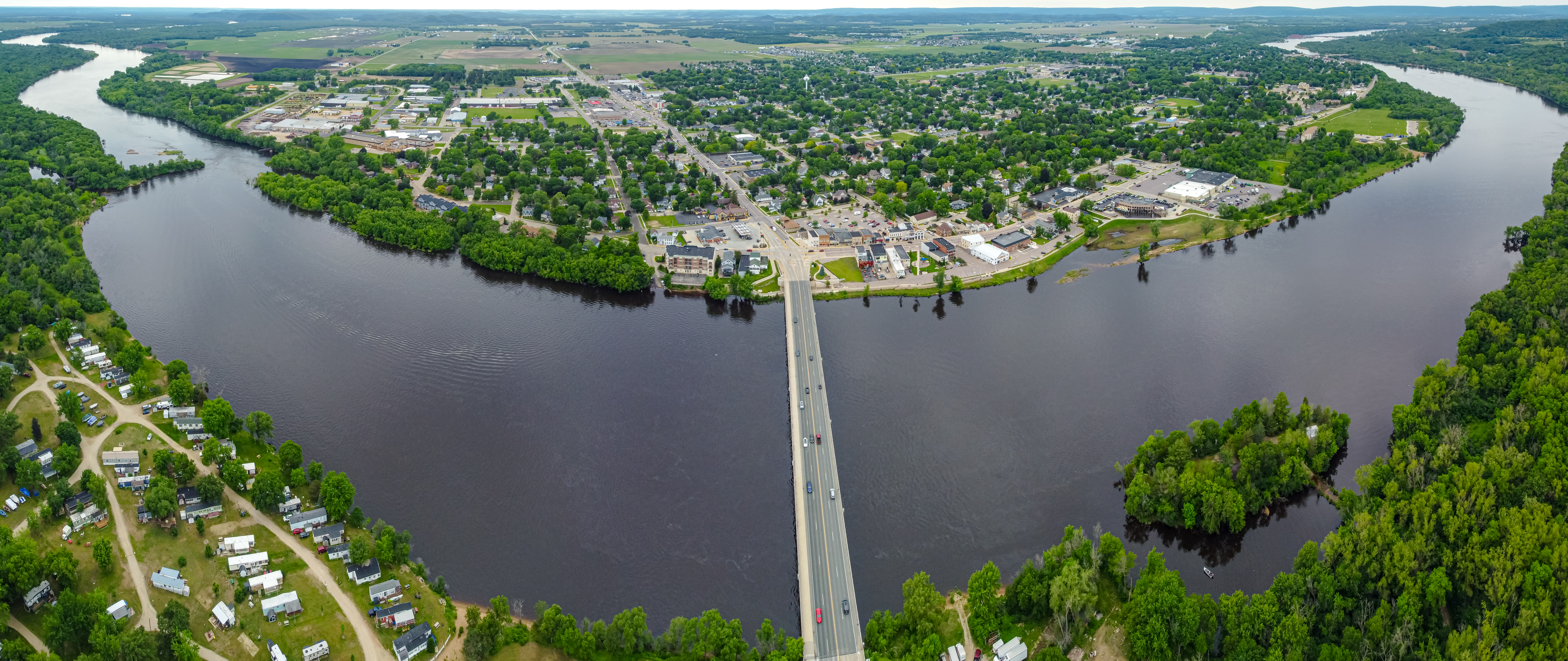
US-12 crossing the Wisconsin River into Sauk City with Priarie Du Sac to the right

Sauk Prairie is the nickname for the adjacent villages of Sauk City and Prairie du Sac, Wisconsin. The twin communities are located on the west bank of the Wisconsin River in southeastern Sauk County, where U.S. Highway 12 crosses the Wisconsin River. As of the 2020 census, the combined population of the two communities was 7,938.

Although the communities share many commonalities and are often seen as parallel versions of each other, their relationship has sometimes been called a "rivalry" and even a "feud". The consolidation of the two municipalities has been discussed a number of times over several decades but has never received approval.

A merger effort in 1939 had too little support to hold a vote. Discussions beginning in 1970 led to a 1972 referendum on consolidation that was approved by voters in Prairie du Sac but rejected by those in Sauk City. In 1983, the Sauk City village board ended months of discussion by voting to table the consideration of a merger. Again, in 1986, the Sauk City Board rejected a proposal to submit the consolidation to a referendum. An advisory referendum, in 1990, to merge the two communities was approved overwhelmingly by voters in both villages, but the binding referendum that followed was approved by only Prairie du Sac voters and was defeated by those in Sauk City. Concerns raised in merger discussions include the cost to taxpayers, agreement on public works projects, and the sense of community identity.

The communities operate several joint municipal services, including the Sauk Prairie Police Department, the ambulance service, and a water treatment plant. The Sauk Prairie School District serves both villages. Area businesses and service organizations also use the name, including the local newspapers, the Sauk Prairie Star and the Sauk Prairie Eagle, Sauk Prairie Hospital, Sauk Prairie Airport, Sauk Prairie Area Literacy Council, and the Sauk Prairie Area Chamber of Commerce. The villages maintain separate fire departments, sewage collection systems, and libraries.

Sauk Prairie is immortalized in the Sac Prairie Saga, a series of novels, short stories, journals, poems, and other works about the area and its residents written by local author August Derleth.

== See also ==
- Badger Army Ammunition Plant
- Culver's - founded and headquartered in Sauk Prairie
- Sauk Prairie High School
- Prairie du Sac Dam
