= Greg Jensen =

American football player (born 1962)

No. 60
- Position: Center / guard

Personal information
- Born: January 23, 1962 (age 64); Sauk City, Wisconsin, U.S.
- Listed height: 6 ft 3 in (1.91 m)
- Listed weight: 266 lb (121 kg)

Career information
- High school: Sauk Prairie (Prairie du Sac, Wisconsin)
- College: None
- NFL draft: 1987: undrafted

Career history
- Wisconsin Express (1986); New York Jets (1987)*; Green Bay Packers (1987); Calgary Stampeders (1988)*
- * Offseason or practice squad member only

Career NFL statistics
- Games played: 1
- Stats at Pro Football Reference

Gregory George Jensen (born January 23, 1962) is an American former professional football player who was a center and guard for the Green Bay Packers of the National Football League (NFL). After playing football at Sauk Prairie High School, he did not attend college and remained out of the sport for six years. He decided to return to football in 1986 and started playing for a semi-professional team in Wisconsin. In 1987, he was signed by the New York Jets, but did not make the team. He later signed with the Packers as a replacement player during the 1987 NFL strike and appeared in one game before being released. He concluded his career with the Calgary Stampeders of the Canadian Football League (CFL).

== Life and career ==
Jensen was born on January 23, 1962, in Sauk City, Wisconsin. He attended Sauk Prairie High School where he played football as an offensive lineman; he was also used as a placekicker. He was an All-Badger Conference selection and graduated in 1980. He did not attend college after graduating from Sauk Prairie and later became a truck driver for Airborne Express. In 1983, he won the Wisconsin wrist-wrestling championship. In 1985, he won the state cow chip throwing championship, and the following year, he won the world championship.

Jensen remained out of football for six years after his graduation from high school. He said that he often watched football on television and thought that "I can do that". In March 1986, he called Diana Lewis, a Madison-based sports agent, and asked her if she could get him a tryout with an NFL team. According to the Green Bay Press-Gazette:

Lewis told Jensen to go home and think about nothing but football for two weeks. She told him to sleep with the football to get a better feel of the pigskin. Jensen then painted the [NFL] emblem on his ceiling so he'd know where he was heading every day and night. He came back two weeks later more determined, and Lewis went to work.

Jensen began playing for the semi-professional Wisconsin Express that same year. Although he initially wanted to play at tight end, he began playing center and long snapper due to the team needing someone at those positions. He helped the Express to an undefeated season. At the end of August 1986, he called Lewis and said that "I'm better than [Green Bay Packers center] Mark Cannon." Lewis then sent Jensen's film to the Packers, but Packers assistant Burt Gustafson only responded that Jensen "is an adequate long snapper but lacked the bulk to take on 290-pound nose tackles." According to the Press-Gazette, "Immediately after reading the letter, Jensen ... began a heavy regimen of eating and power lifting". After working out 2 and 1/2 hours per day for a few months, the 6 feet 4 inches (1.93 m) Jensen had bulked up from 250 pounds (110 kg) to 275 pounds (125 kg) by March 1987. He received a tryout with the Packers in January 1987, but was not signed.

After his tryout with the Packers, Jensen was brought to the NFL Scouting Combine in Indianapolis by his agent, even though he was not invited. He impressed scouts of the New York Jets at the combine, and a few weeks later, the Jets signed him. At the time, he was able to bench press 400 pounds (180 kg) and reportedly was able to run the 40-yard dash in 4.8 seconds. However, he ended up being waived by the Jets on July 28, 1987.

In September 1987, the NFL Players Association went on strike, and thus teams signed replacement players. Jensen signed with the Packers as a replacement to play guard. He made his NFL debut in Week 5 against the Detroit Lions, becoming the only player in the NFL that year to not have attended college, as well as the first since 1980. Against the Lions, Jensen played the entire second half at left guard, coming in for Jim Hobbins, who had moved to right guard after an injury to Perry Hartnett. He told The Capital Times that "I had a blast, I just took out everybody I could", although he noted that he struggled in blocking when the Lions were blitzing. A few days after the game, he was placed on injured reserve with an ankle injury. He was released from injured reserve on October 19, 1987, after having played in just one game. In 1988, he signed with the Calgary Stampeders of the Canadian Football League (CFL), but was later released, ending his professional career.
