= Sauk City Fire Station =

Historic fire station in Sauk City, Wisconsin

- U.S. National Register of Historic Places
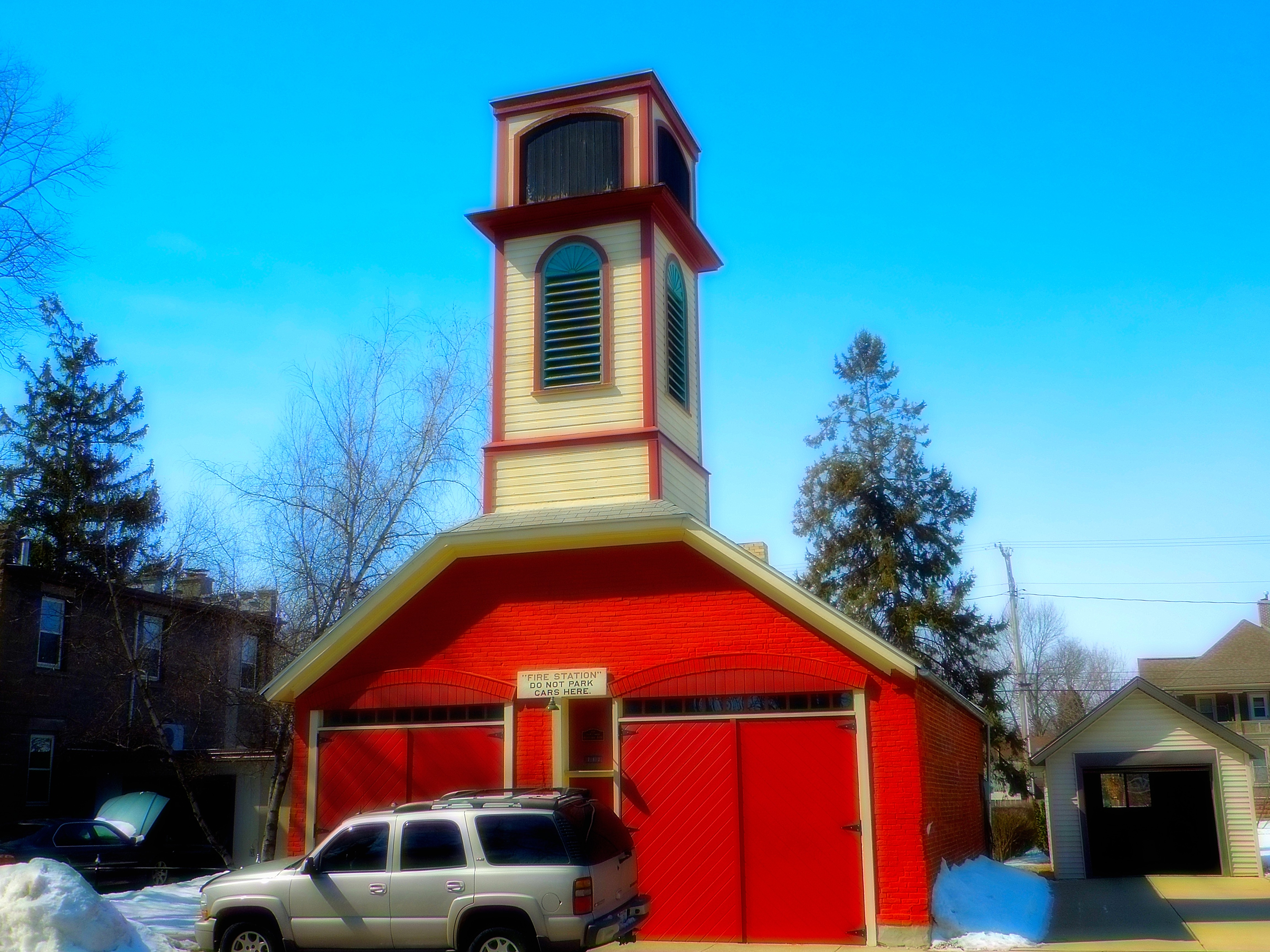

- Location within Wisconsin Location within the United States
- Location: 717 John Adams St. Sauk City, Wisconsin
- Coordinates: 43°16′22″N 89°43′16″W
- Built: 1862, c. 1870
- NRHP reference No.: 99000920
- Added to NRHP: July 28, 1999

The Sauk City Fire Station, begun in 1862, housed the city's early fire department, and served as a center of the community. Today it is one of the oldest fire stations in Wisconsin. It looks much like it did in 1870 - a gable-roofed building with a hose-drying tower. It was added to the National Register of Historic Places in 1999.

== History ==
Sauk City's volunteer fire department was established in 1854, after a fire in November destroyed two stores, a tin shop, a house, a cooper shop, a barn and four horses. After this disaster for the small town, a meeting was called to organize a fire department. Charles Spiehr of the German Free Congregation was elected first president, and the fire department was organized into an engine company under J.J. Heller, a hook and ladder company under Charles Deininger, a bucket company under F. Franzel, and a rescue and protection company under Henry Hantzsch. They met at Schneider-Schreiber's Hall, drilled, and resolved that the minutes from that early phase be written in German. By 1859, the department's equipment consisted of a wagon, ladders, J.J. Heller's homemade pump, a large hook for pulling down burning buildings, a small hook, 60 feet of rope, a box to hold the rope, two dozen tin pails, lanterns, five speaking horns, and a record book.

In 1861 the small fire company heard of a good fire engine available from Milwaukee for $200. They had 80 cents in the treasury at that point, but they ordered it, and proceeded to raise money. (One of the fundraisers was at Stinglehamer's beer hall.) Once the engine arrived, it needed a shed, and some of the firemen proposed another fundraiser on the Fourth of July, but Vice-captain Halasz threatened to resign over that date. (There was a lot of contention in those early years.) Eventually the village provided a half lot and $200, and a brick fire station was built, 11 feet wide by 36 feet deep, with a simple gable roof and no tower. Sections of that 1862 brick station are still present as the south bay of the current building.

Also in 1862, a number of members who belonged to Sauk City's rifle company left to fight in the Civil War. This reduced the fire company to the point where it considered disbanding, but the remaining men voted 15 to 12 to continue.

In 1870 Sauk City's fire company bought another hand-pumped engine, called "the large engine," from the city of Madison. This required more storage space and it was probably at this point that the 1862 brick station was expanded from one bay to two by tearing out the north wall, building a new north wall to expand the hall from 11 feet wide to 28 feet, building a new roof over the old one, and adding the hose-drying tower on the ridge of the new roof. The result probably looked very much like the station looks today, except that the front doors were smaller, topped with segmental brick arches. The square tower stands 15 feet above the roof, including a belfry which holds the station's alarm bell. A shallow dome once topped the belfry, but that has been removed.

One of the worst fires in Sauk City's history came shortly after, when the Siebel Bakery on Water Street burned. The Pioneer Press was proud of the work of the fire company:

...Only the action of the unfailing large fire engine and the brave men who worked at the pump and water pails with all their strength...we have these to thank for keeping the fire in control. A light wind from the northeast turned to the east and blew coals and shingles for a block and one lit the cupola of the Meyer refrigerator building.... The roof of the Ninman dwelling was spared but the heat was great. Even against the wind the heat approached the cottage of Mrs. Ottilie Meyer and they had to keep spraying it with water and chemical spray. The window broke and the woodwork was scorched. They carried much of the furniture out of it. ...The family Siebel lived in the upper part of the building. The youngest child couldn't sleep and kept Mrs. Seibel awake. Suddenly she perceived a strong smell of the pine wood and even before they could dress themselves the smoke was coming into the rooms.... He tried to telephone but he got no answer from central and hurried to the fire house and rang the bell. Anybody who doesn't believe we have a good fire department should look at the ruins. If you look at the buildings the way they were standing tightly against each other you have to be surprised the fire could even be brought under control. The large fire engine was not even, through a misunderstanding, very quick to come to the place and when they did come, they brought the wrong hose. Still from that time on until the first stream was placed over the fire you could see there was no hope in saving it. For three hours the large engine was used without stopping. Even the women gave them a hand and helped the men with the pumping. Two hoses worked in spite of the cold. They functioned above all expectations. They could have frozen and broken or the pump could have quit on them and then a person can't even think about it. Now that people see what great danger we stand in with our old-fashioned and impractical water works, there is talk again about a new water works system. Now let us keep the ball rolling and vote on it..."

By 1900 the fire station was expanded again by moving a wooden building up against its back end. Around that time, the station contained two iron cages that served as the village jail. The village had no other municipal buildings for years, so that rear section was used for meetings of the village board, for other meetings, and as a polling place until 1937 when the village made the Curtis Hotel into a city hall with help from the Works Progress Administration.

The little station bought its first motorized truck in 1924, a Grass-Premier truck built right in Sauk City. This truck is probably what forced them to enlarge the north door. They bought a second Grass-Premier truck in 1928.

In 1954 the new fire station was built on Madison Street, and the old station stood idle for a decade. In 1963 the building was renovated a bit and converted to a community museum. In 1994 the Sauk Prairie Area Historical Society leased the building, tore down the sagging rear addition, and raised money to repair the roof and tower. The building now houses a museum displaying historic firefighting equipment.
