= Great Sauk Trail =

Great Sauk Trail can refer to:

- Great Sauk State Trail, a biking trail in Sauk County, Wisconsin
- Sauk Trail, an Indian trail across Illinois, Indiana and Michigan
- Great Sauk Trail Council, a Boy Scout council in southern Michigan
