= Sauk City, Wisconsin =

- Village
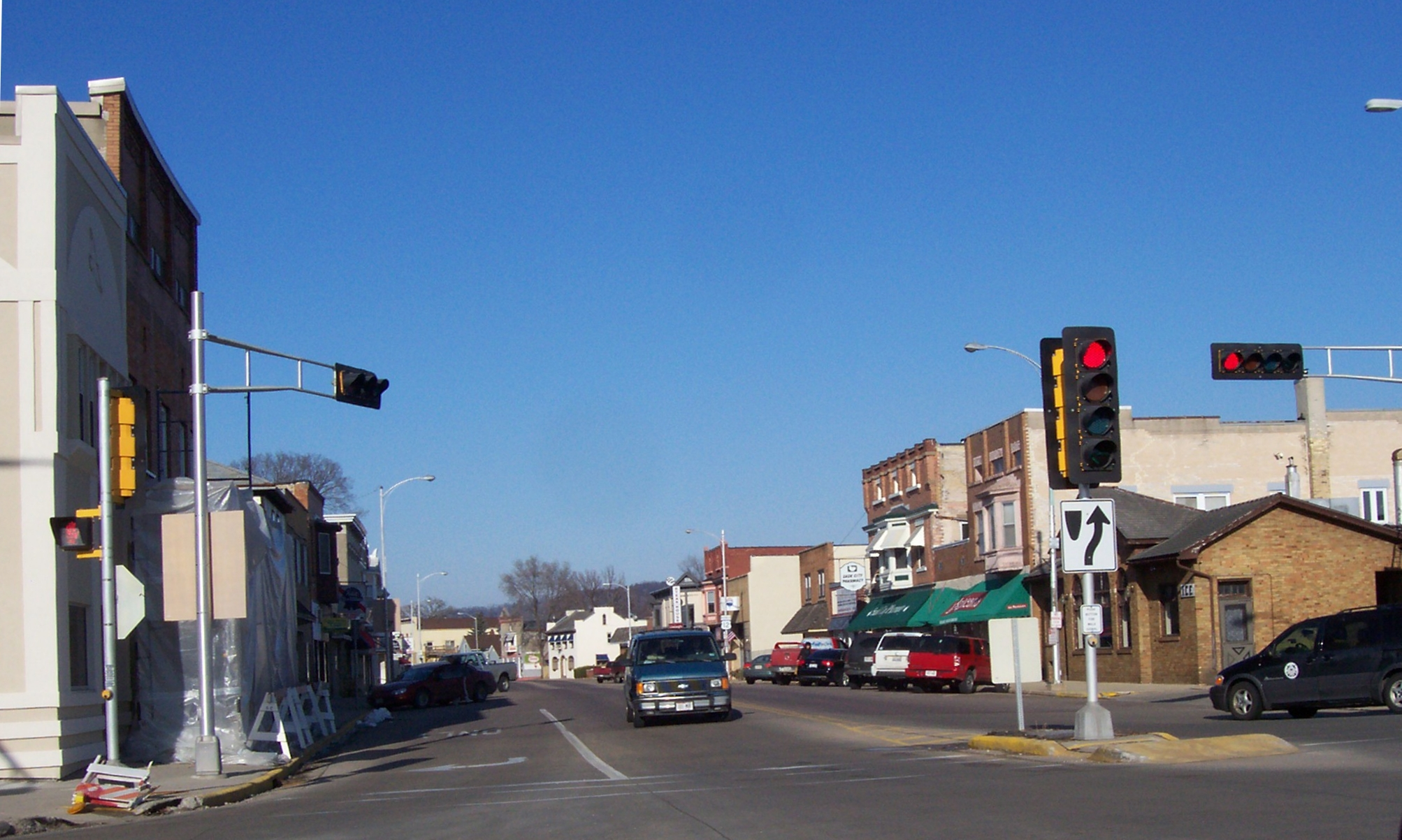
- Downtown Sauk City

- Location of Sauk City in Sauk County, Wisconsin.
- Coordinates: 43°16′27″N 89°43′42″W
- Country: United States
- State: Wisconsin
- County: Sauk

Area
  - Total: 1.76 sq mi (4.57 km^{2})
  - Land: 1.54 sq mi (3.99 km^{2})
  - Water: 0.22 sq mi (0.58 km^{2})
- Elevation: 741 ft (226 m)

Population (2020)
  - Total: 3,518
  - Density: 2,261.6/sq mi (873.22/km^{2})
- Time zone: UTC-6 (Central (CST))
  - Summer (DST): UTC-5 (CDT)
- Area code: 608
- FIPS code: 55-71650
- GNIS feature ID: 1573732
- Website: http://www.saukcity.net

Sauk City is a village in Sauk County, Wisconsin, United States, located along the Wisconsin River. The population was 3,518 as of the 2020 census. The first incorporated village in the state, the community was founded by Agoston Haraszthy and his business partner, Robert Bryant in the 1840s.

== History ==
A large village of the Sauk people stood beside the Wisconsin River on the site of Sauk City before the first European-Americans settled there. The Sauk probably arrived around 1746, driven from previous homes in the Fox River valley. In 1766 the explorer Jonathan Carver visited the village, and described what he called the "Great Town of the Saukies":

This is the largest and best built Indian town I ever saw. It contains about ninety houses, each large enough for several families. These are built of hewn plank neatly jointed, and covered with bark so compactly as to keep out the most penetrating rains. Before the doors are placed comfortable sheds, in which the inhabitants sit, when the weather will permit, and smoak their pipes. The streets are regular and spacious; so that it appears more like a civilized town than the abode of savages. The land near the town is very good. In their plantations, which lie adjacent to their houses, and which are neatly laid out, they raise great quantities of Indian corn, beans, melons, &c. so that this place is esteemed the best market for traders to furnish themselves with provisions, of any within eight hundred miles of it.

The Sauk probably abandoned this site around 1790. Edmond Rendtorpf would later describe what the he and other early settlers found when they arrived fifty years after the Sauk left, in 1840:

All then was covered with Indian hills; thousands of deer bones, glass neck pearls, arrow points of flint, and Indian graves everywhere to be found. Yes here they hunted, fished, raised corn, and died. Time has decayed the bones; the new generation, children of Germans, have picked up their glass pearls, etc. to play with, their corn hills have been leveled, the Village of Sauk City being located upon them..."

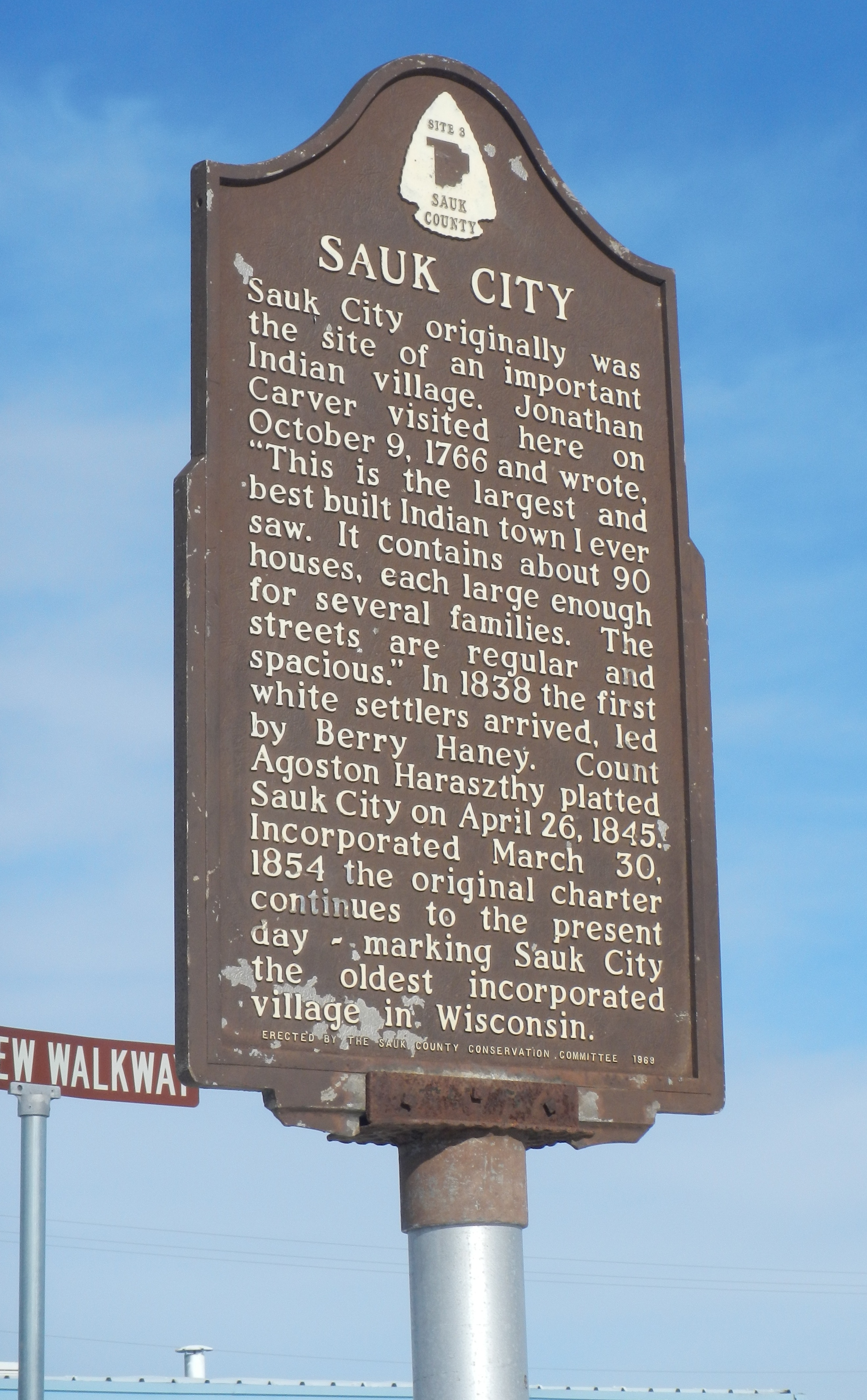
Historical marker

Impressed by the beautiful scenery, Agoston Haraszthy, a charismatic Hungarian sometimes called "Count" Haraszthy, purchased a small plot of land along the Wisconsin River in 1840. Later, with his English-born business partner, Robert Bryant, Haraszthy bought additional land and founded the town of Haraszthy (originally called Széptáj, Hungarian for "beautiful place").

In 1849, the name of the town was changed to Westfield. Three years later, in 1852, it was changed again, this time to the current name of Sauk City. The community was incorporated as a village in 1854, making Sauk City the oldest incorporated village in the state.

In 1852, German immigrants founded the Sauk City Free Congregation (Freie Gemeinde). This group, a liberal religious society, celebrated German music, literature, and culture. It met in a private home until 1884, when Park Hall was built as a meeting house. The building is now home to the Sauk County Free Congregation, a Unitarian Universalist fellowship.

In the Harper's Weekly magazine of November 21, 1914, Sauk City was named "America's Foremost City". The article cited a pageant, attended by 4000 people, which enacted scenes from the village's history, and concluded with the naming of the school principal as the Civic Secretary, charged with making the school the center of the life of the town. To that end, the ballot box was transferred from the town hall to the school house.

In 2017, the Great Sauk State Trail opened on the former railroad line running through the city.

== Geography ==
Sauk City is located at 43°16′27″N 89°43′42″W (43.274130, -89.728310). It is situated on U.S. Route 12, approximately 18 miles (29 km) northwest of suburban Madison.

According to the United States Census Bureau, the village has a total area of 1.76 square miles (4.56 km^{2}), of which 1.54 square miles (3.99 km^{2}) is land and 0.22 square miles (0.57 km^{2}) is water.

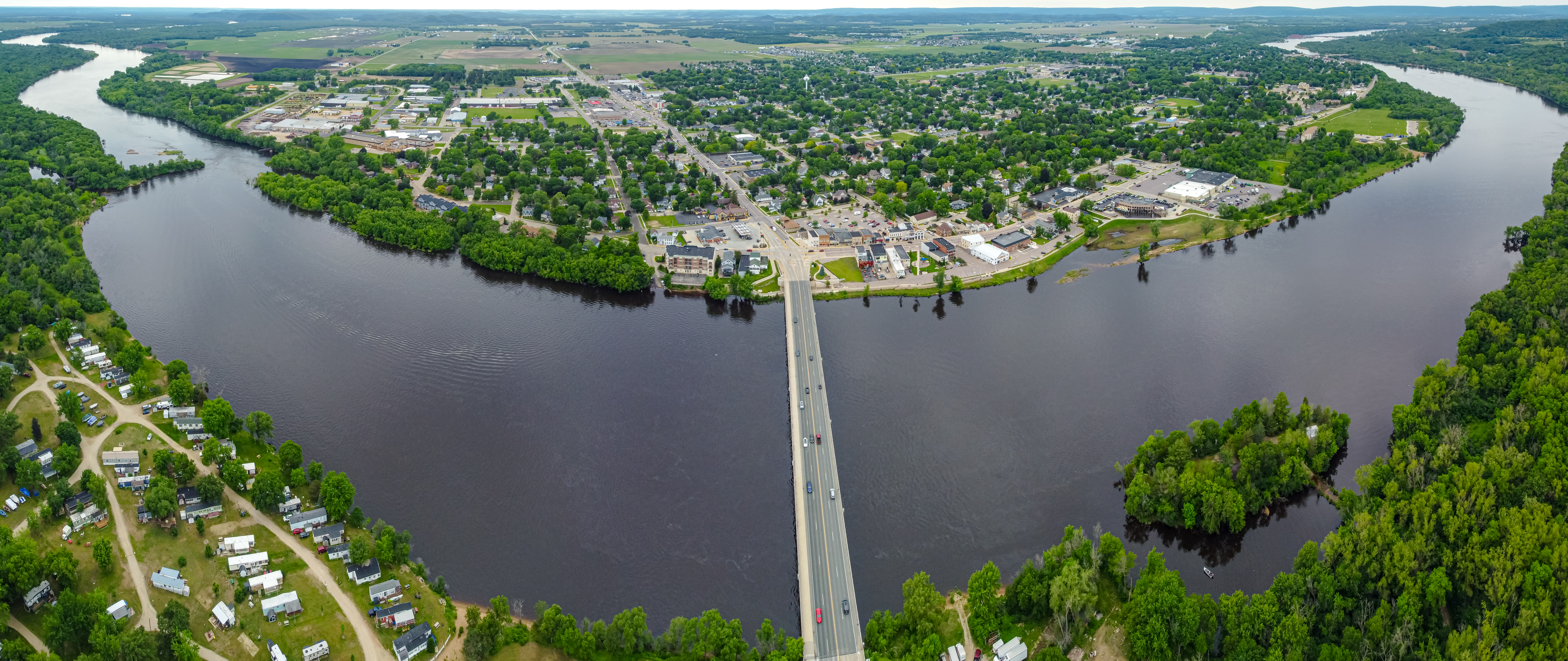
US-12 crossing the Wisconsin River into Sauk City

== Demographics ==
Historical population
Census	Pop.	Note	%±
1880	917		—
1890	876		−4.5%
1900	810		−7.5%
1910	867		7.0%
1920	1,162		34.0%
1930	1,137		−2.2%
1940	1,325		16.5%
1950	1,755		32.5%
1960	2,095		19.4%
1970	2,385		13.8%
1980	2,703		13.3%
1990	3,019		11.7%
2000	3,109		3.0%
2010	3,410		9.7%
2020	3,518		3.2%
U.S. Decennial Census

=== 2020 census ===
As of the census of 2020, the population was 3,518. The population density was 2,282.9 inhabitants per square mile (881.4/km^{2}). There were 1,572 housing units at an average density of 1,020.1 per square mile (393.9/km^{2}). The racial makeup of the village was 89.3% White, 0.5% Black or African American, 0.5% Asian, 0.4% Native American, 3.3% from other races, and 6.0% from two or more races. Ethnically, the population was 6.2% Hispanic or Latino of any race.

=== 2010 census ===
As of the census of 2010, there were 3,410 people, 1,431 households, and 871 families living in the village. The population density was 2,243.4 inhabitants per square mile (866.2/km^{2}). There were 1,508 housing units at an average density of 992.1 per square mile (383.1/km^{2}). The racial makeup of the village was 94.6% White, 0.2% African American, 0.9% Native American, 0.4% Asian, 2.8% from other races, and 1.1% from two or more races. Hispanic or Latino of any race were 5.0% of the population.

Out of a total of 1,431 households, 31.7% had children under the age of 18 living with them, 45.2% were married couples living together, 10.2% had a female householder with no husband present, 5.5% had a male householder with no wife present, and 39.1% were non-families. 32.8% of all households were made up of individuals, and 13.8% had someone living alone who was 65 years of age or older. The average household size was 2.30 and the average family size was 2.93.

The median age in the village was 39.3 years. 23.8% of residents were under the age of 18; 7% were between the ages of 18 and 24; 27.2% were from 25 to 44; 24.9% were from 45 to 64; and 17.2% were 65 years of age or older. The gender makeup of the village was 47.2% male and 52.8% female.

=== 2000 census ===
As of the census of 2000, there were 3,109 residents, 1,285 households, and 796 families living in the village. The population density was 2,078.0 people per square mile (800.3/km^{2}). There were 1,314 housing units at an average density of 878.3 per square mile (338.2/km^{2}). The racial makeup of the village was 97.01% White, 0.39% African American, 0.23% Native American, 0.19% Asian, 1.45% from other races, and 0.74% from two or more races. Hispanic or Latino of any race were 3.76% of the population.

Out of a total of 1,285 households, 30.8% had children under the age of 18 living with them, 49.8% were married couples living together, 8.7% had a female householder with no husband present, and 38.0% were non-families. 32.5% of all households were made up of individuals, and 14.6% had someone living alone who was 65 years of age or older. The average household size was 2.33 and the average family size was 2.99.

In the village, the population was spread out, with 24.2% under the age of 18, 7.5% from 18 to 24, 29.9% from 25 to 44, 19.2% from 45 to 64, and 19.3% who were 65 years of age or older. The median age was 38 years. For every 100 females, there were 92.4 males. For every 100 females age 18 and over, there were 87.3 males.

The median income for a household in the village was $36,378, and the median income for a family was $45,156. Males had a median income of $29,908 versus $22,996 for females. The per capita income for the village was $17,705. About 10.0% of families and 12.5% of the population were below the poverty line, including 18.4% of those under age 18 and 17.6% of those age 65 or over.

== Economy ==
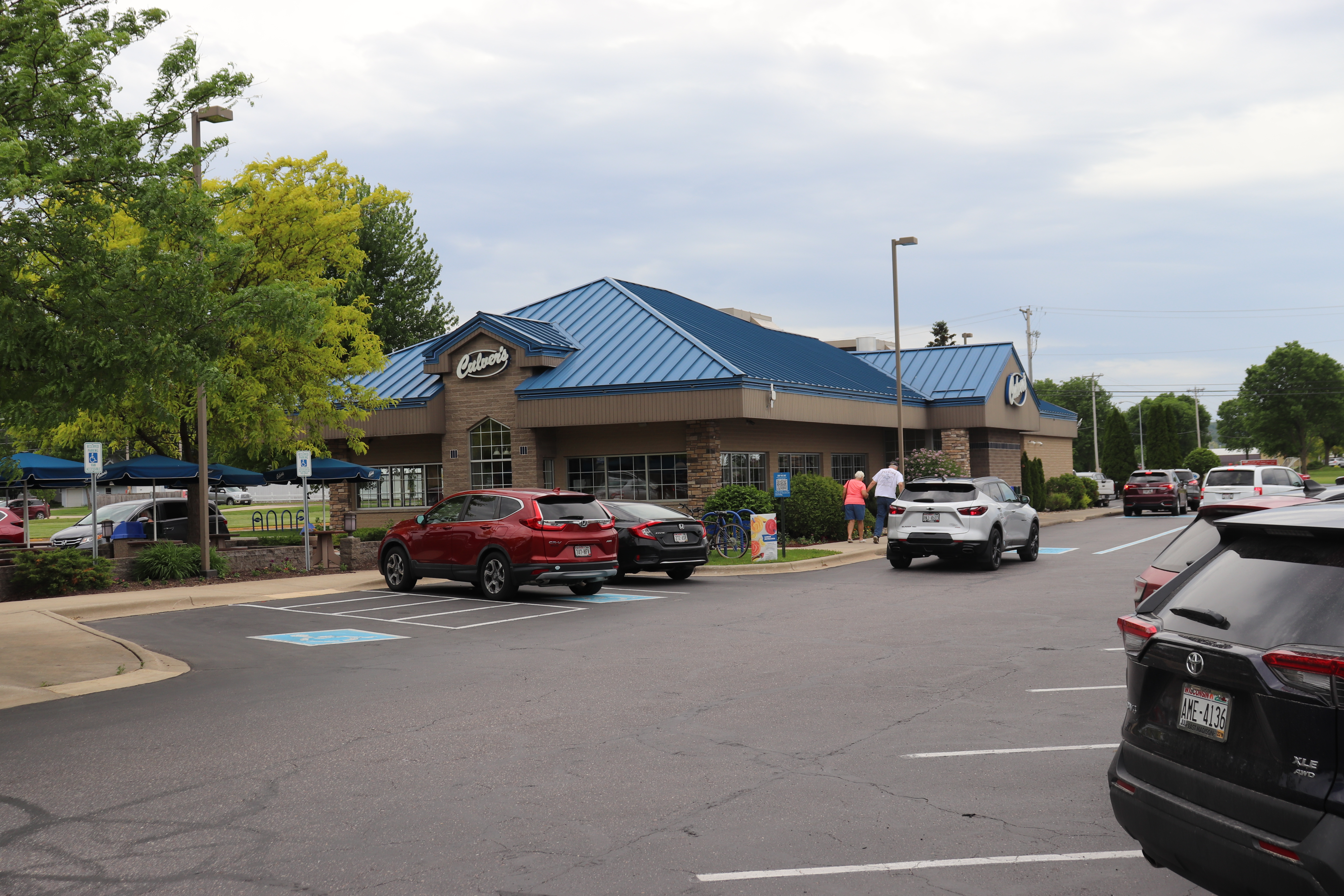
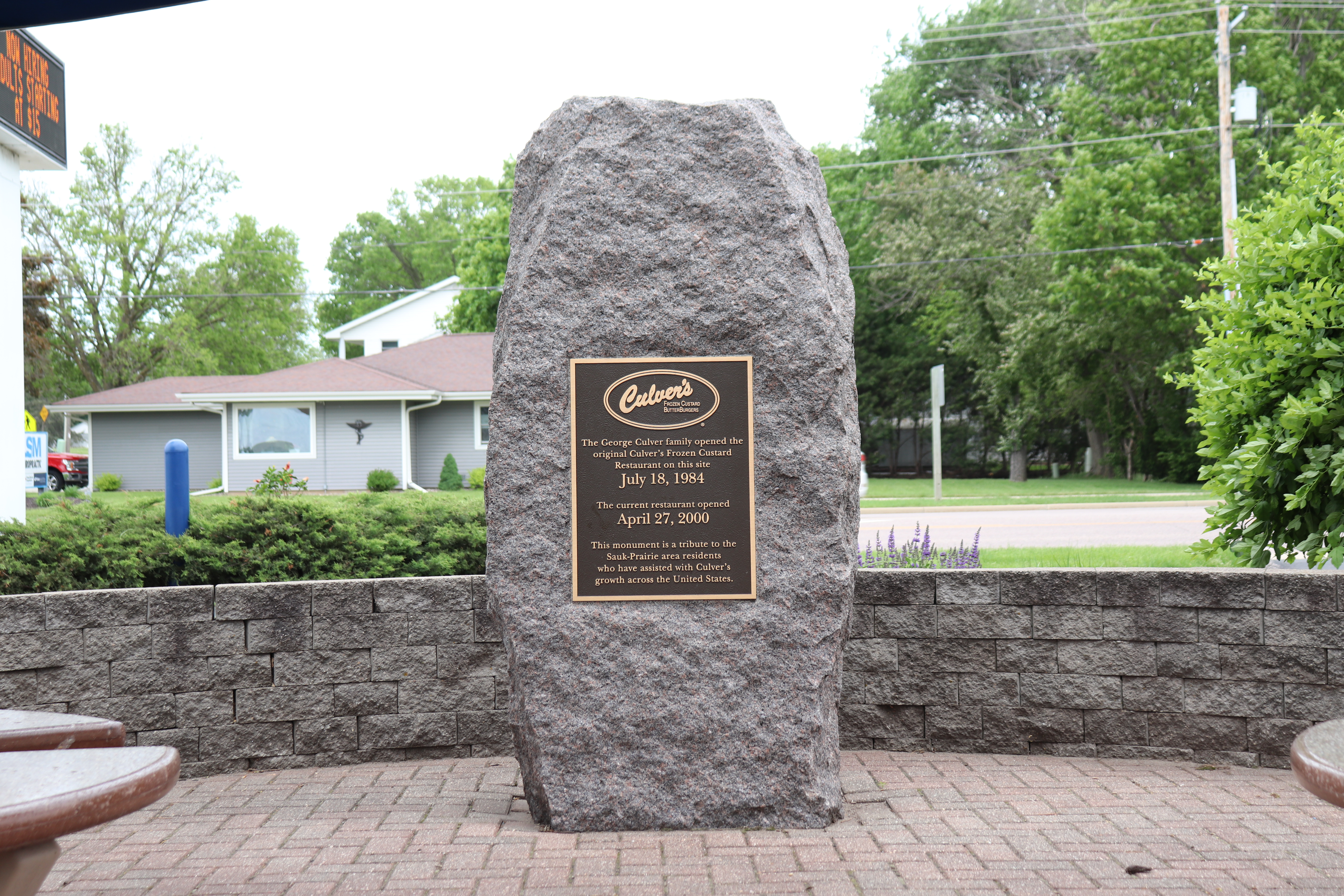
Original Culver's location (not original building) and monument on Phillips Boulevard.

Sauk City is the site of the first Culver's restaurant, which opened July 18, 1984. Culver's corporate headquarters are located in neighboring Prairie du Sac.

In 1939, Arkham House, a firm devoted to preserving in print the work of H. P. Lovecraft and other dark fantasists, was founded by August Derleth and Donald Wandrei in Sauk City, where the firm continues to be headquartered.

Cuca Records was founded by James Kirchstein in 1959 and was located on Water Street next to Kirchstein's Super Market (founded by James's father, Frank Kirchstein, which was in business from the 1930s to 1982 and featured polka music on 8-track tapes in the store). Cuca Records produced records until the early 1970s, including polka, folk, and jazz.

Sauk City is also where Jacob Leinenkugel of the Leinenkugel Brewing Company was born and raised.

== Buildings and structures ==
- Sauk City Fire Station
- Cuca Records
- Freethinkers' Hall
- Lachmund Family House

== Government ==
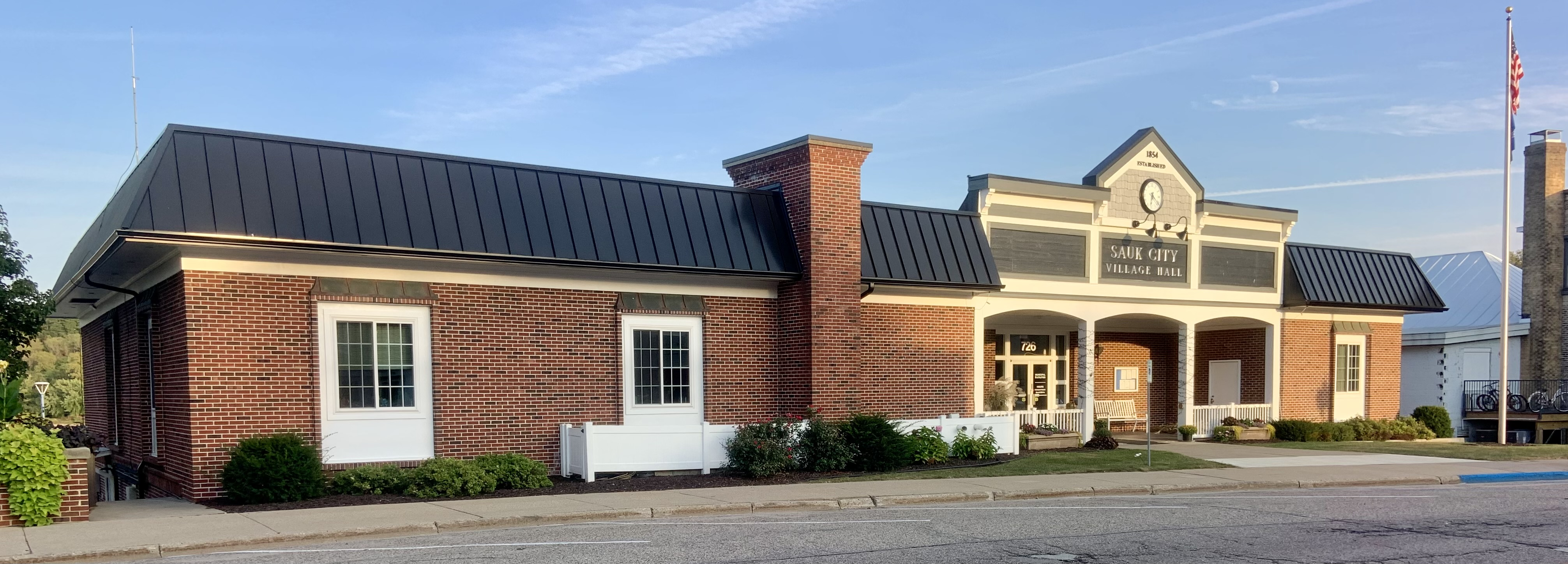
Sauk City Village Hall

Sauk City is adjacent to Prairie du Sac, located directly to the north. Both communities are located on the west bank of the Wisconsin River. They share a municipal boundary, as well as a school system, police department, and hospital, but have separate fire departments and libraries. The Sauk City Fire Department is the oldest organized volunteer department in the state of Wisconsin, having been founded in 1854. Efforts have been made to join the two villages into a single entity, Sauk Prairie, but these have failed because of tax differences between the communities.

== Education ==
Sauk Prairie High School, located in Prairie du Sac, serves the villages of Sauk City and Prairie du Sac. The school's mascot is the eagle, so named because of the population of eagles found on the Wisconsin River adjacent to Sauk Prairie.

== Notable people ==
- August Derleth, author and publisher
- Agoston Haraszthy, traveler, writer, and pioneer winemaker
- Greg Jensen, former NFL player
- Robert J. Keller, former Wisconsin State Representative
- Cyrus Leland, attorney and state assemblyman
- Emanuel L. Philipp, former Governor of Wisconsin
- John B. Quimby, former Wisconsin State Senator
- Mark Schorer, author, professor
- Scott Schutt, former NFL player
