= Lachmund Family House =

Historic house in Wisconsin, United States

- U.S. National Register of Historic Places
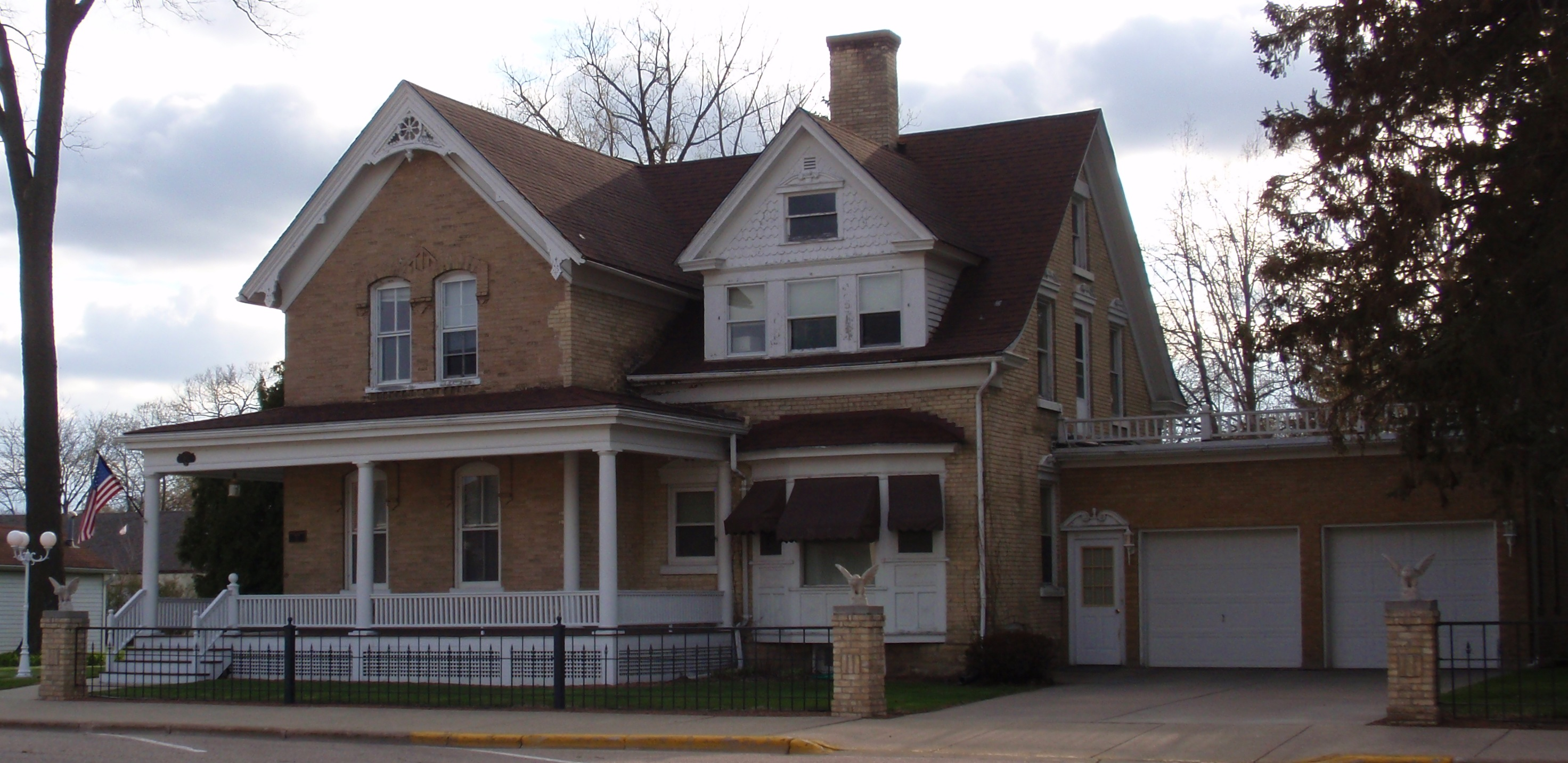

- Location within Wisconsin Location within the United States
- Location: 717 Water St. Sauk City, Wisconsin
- Coordinates: 43°16′22″N 89°43′16″W
- Area: less than one acre
- Built: c.1878, c.1903
- Architectural style: Queen Anne/Gothic Revival
- NRHP reference No.: 00000257
- Added to NRHP: March 29, 2000

The Lachmund Family House, also known as the Halasz/Lachmund House, is a historic house located at 717 Water Street in Sauk City, Wisconsin. It is locally significant in the social history of Sauk City. It was added to the National Register of Historic Places on March 29, 2000.

It is a two-story, cream brick house, surrounded by a reproduction wrought iron fence. It has a wrap-around front porch. It was built in c.1878 and c.1903. The cream brick had to be brought by river from the railway at Portage; the house seems to be the only residence in Sauk City built of that material in its era.
