= Dells of the Wisconsin River =

Gorge on the Wisconsin River in Wisconsin, United States

Coordinates: 43.6428°N 89.7885°W

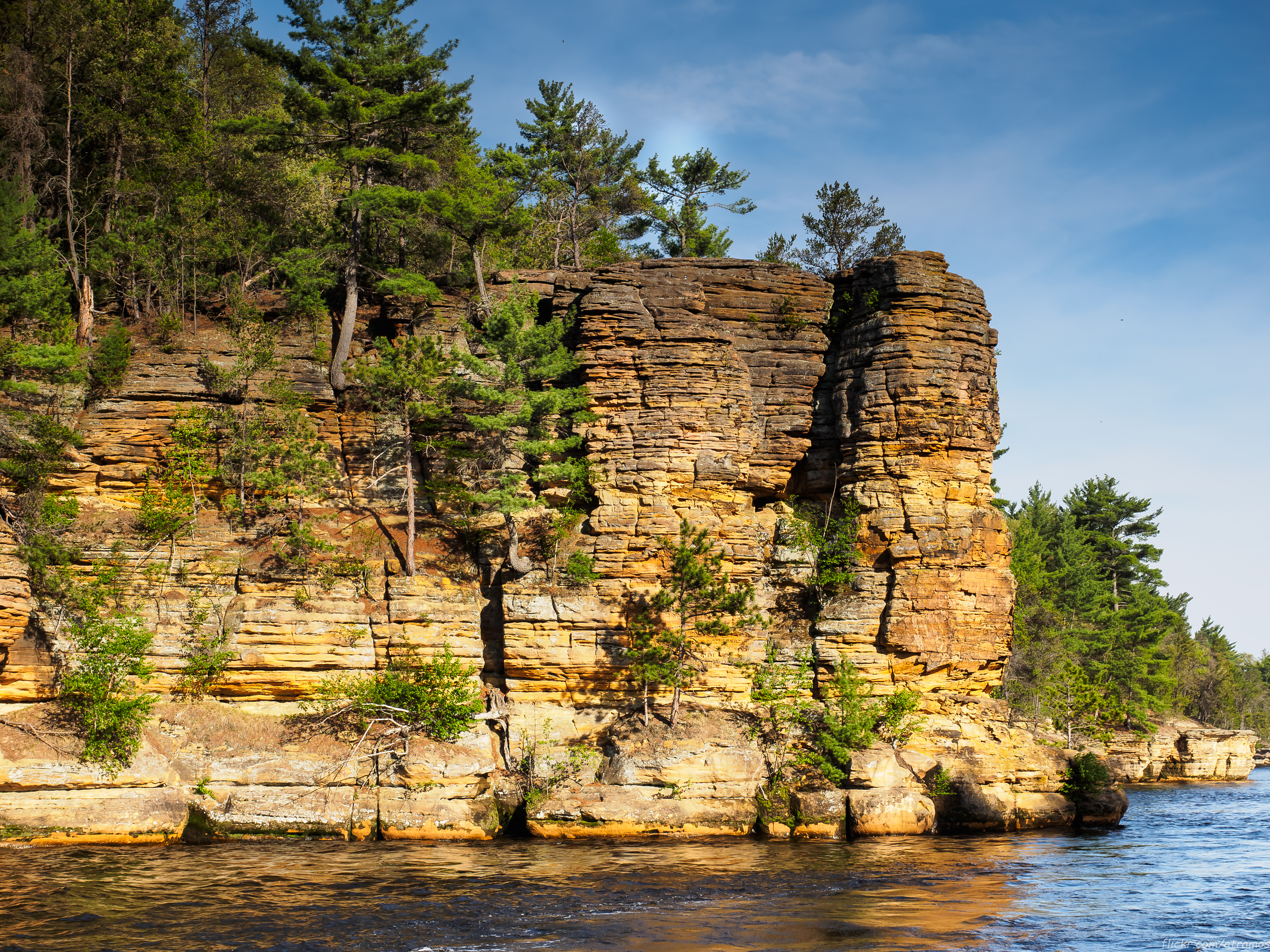
Dells of the Wisconsin River

The Dells of the Wisconsin River, also called the Wisconsin Dells (from Old English "dæl", modern English "dale"), meaning "valley", is a 5-mile (8-km) gorge on the Wisconsin River in south-central Wisconsin, United States. It is noted for its scenery, in particular for its Cambrian sandstone rock formations and tributary canyons. The formations are divided into the "Upper Dells" and the "Lower Dells" by the Kilbourn Dam.

The cliffs, some over 100 feet (30 m) tall, and side canyons are closed to the public to protect sensitive ecological features. Viewing the rock formations by water is a tourist attraction in the area. The nearby city of Wisconsin Dells is the center of summer tourist activity, much of it in the form of the theme parks unrelated to the river features.

The Dells of the Wisconsin River is owned by the Wisconsin Department of Natural Resources. It was established as a State Natural Area in 1994.

== Description and formation ==
The Dells was formed during the Last Glacial Period approximately 15,000 years ago, although the rock itself is much older, dating from the Cambrian Period approximately 510–520 million years ago when the area of Wisconsin was at the bottom of a shallow sea.

Approximately 19,000 years ago, the Dells was at the extreme western margin of the continental glacier. However, the Dells itself was never covered by glacial ice sheets – it was part of the large Driftless Area that was bypassed by the ice. The melting of the glacier formed Glacial Lake Wisconsin, a lake about the size of Great Salt Lake in Utah and as deep as 150 feet (45 m). The lake was held back by an ice dam of the remaining glacier. The eventual bursting of the ice dam unleashed a catastrophic flood, dropping the lake's depth to 50 feet (15 m) and cutting deep, narrow gorges and unusual rock formations into the sandstone seen today.

== Ecosystem ==
The area of the Dells provides a mixture of plant communities, including northern and southern oak, pine forests, as well as oak savanna, moist cliffs, and dry cliffs.

The cliffs provide unique niches for plants, some of which are very rare in Wisconsin, including:

- Cliff cudweed (Gnaphalium obtusifolium var saxicola ), which is known in only two places on Earth – in the Dells and in the Kickapoo Valley, grows on protected rock ledges.
- Lapland azalea (Rhododendron lapponicum)
- Round-stemmed false foxglove (Agalinis gattingeri)
- Maidenhair spleenwort (Asplenium trichomanes)
- Fragrant fern (Dryopteris fragrans).

Among the rare animals in the dell are six dragonfly species, including the Royal river cruiser (Macromia taeniolata), six rare mussels and numerous species of birds.

== Cultural history ==
The cultural history of the area stretches back several thousand years, from early Paleo-Indian people to the more recent Native American peoples, such as Ho-Chunk, Sac, and Menominee, who left behind effigy and burial mounds, camps and village sites, garden beds, and rock art.

The Dells were made famous in 1886 by the photographer H. H. Bennett, who took the first stop-action photo of his son jumping onto Stand Rock.

The Kilbourn Dam, completed in 1909, raised the water level of the Upper Dells by about 17 feet (5.2 m), flooding some of the caves and rock formations in Bennett's photographs.

== Protected status ==
The area is now owned by the Wisconsin Department of Natural Resources and was designated a State Natural Area in 1994.

== Gallery ==
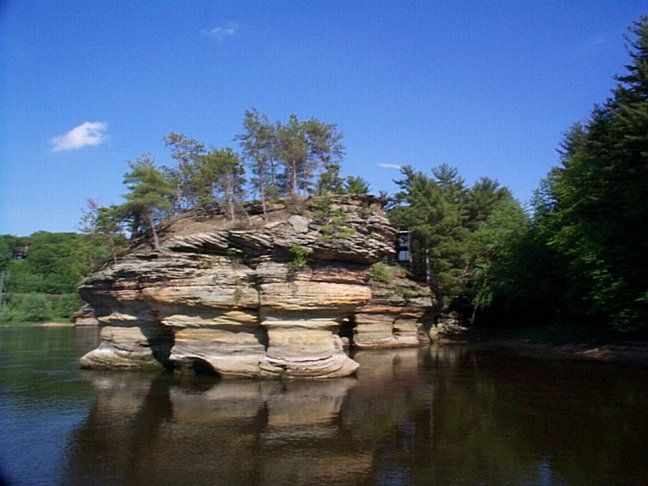
Rock formation on the Wisconsin Dells

H.H. Bennett's photo of Stand Rock

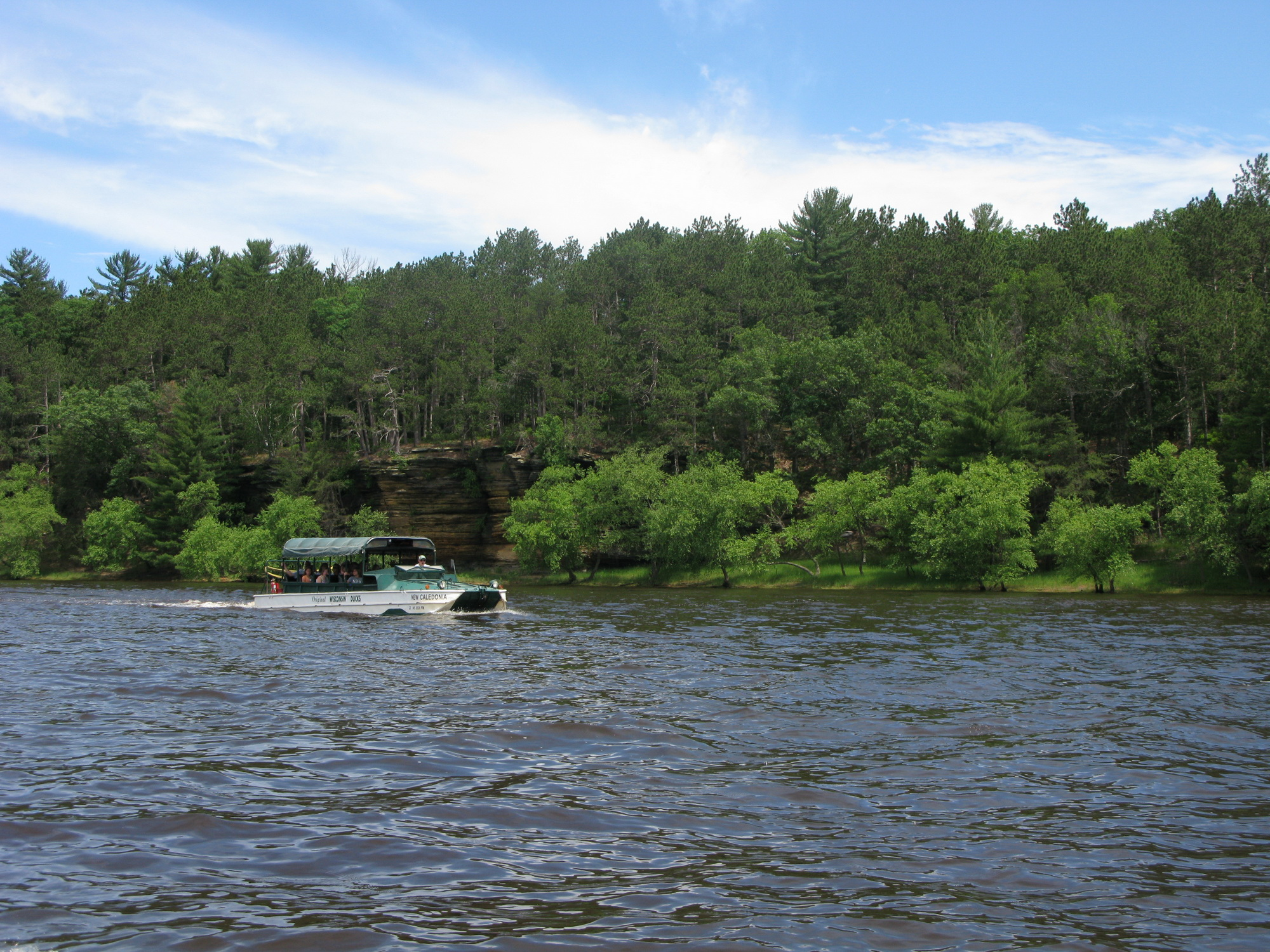
Amphibious DUKW vehicle in Wisconsin Dells

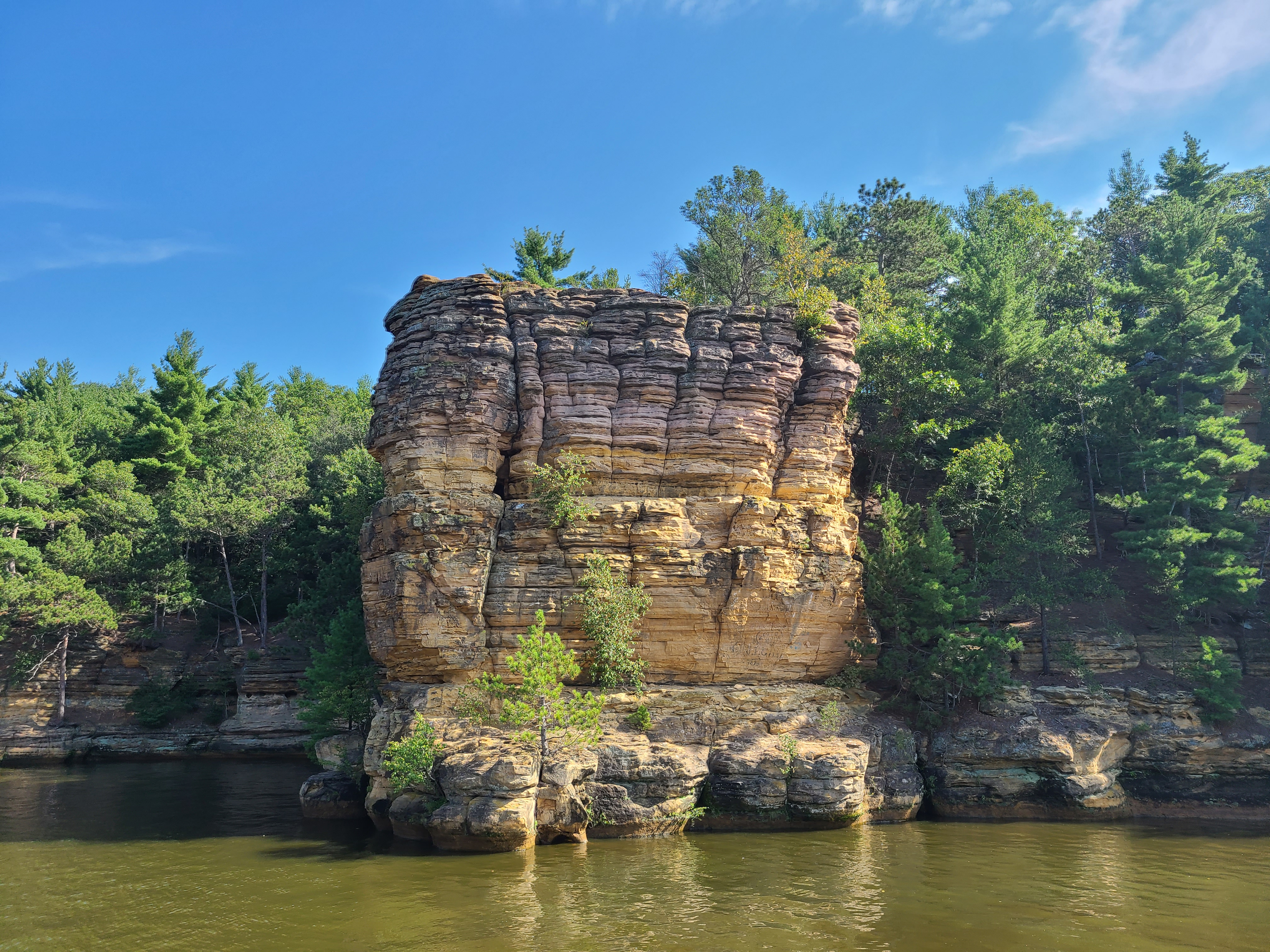
Cliffs at the Wisconsin Dells

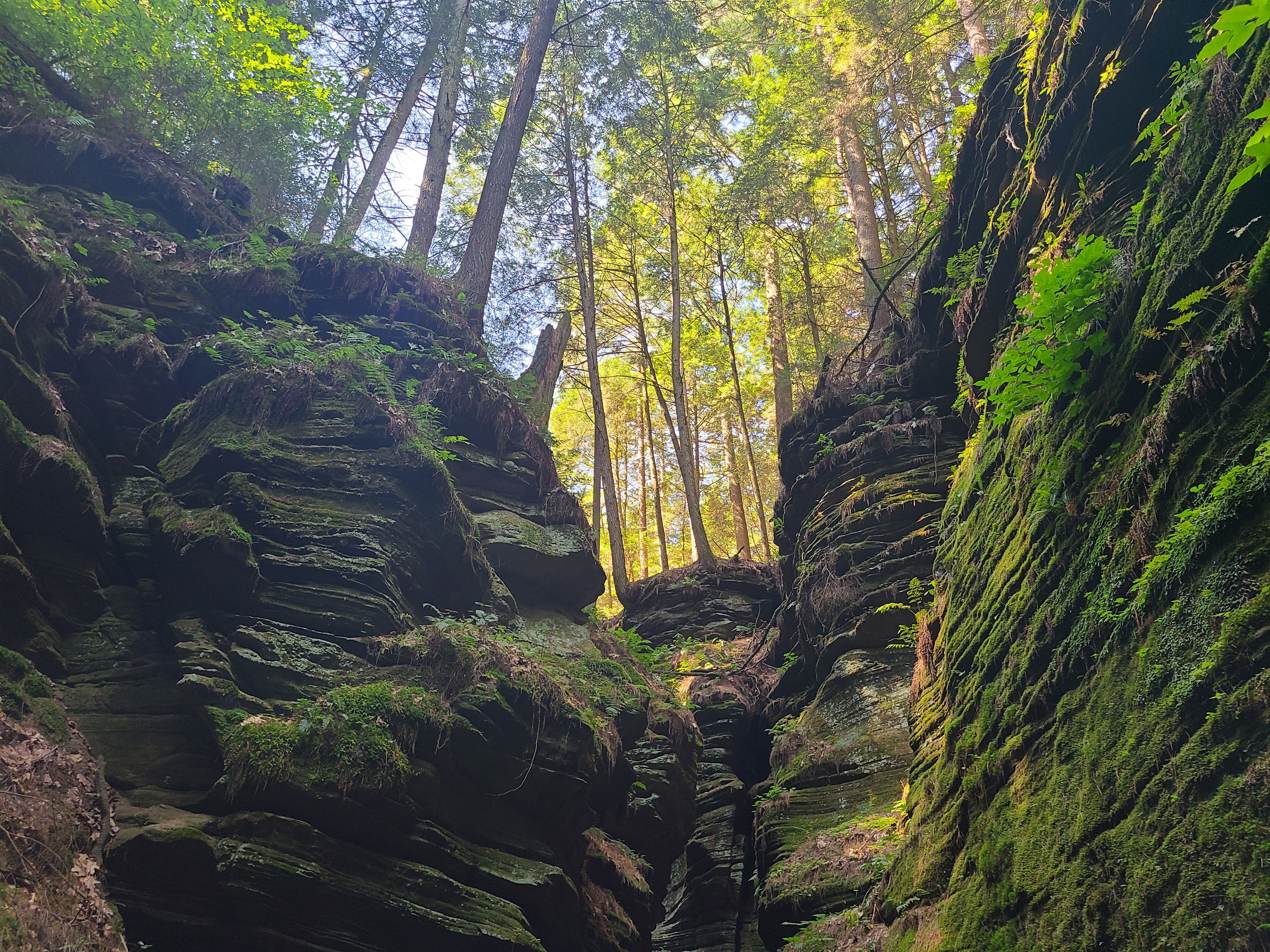
Forest above Witches Gulch

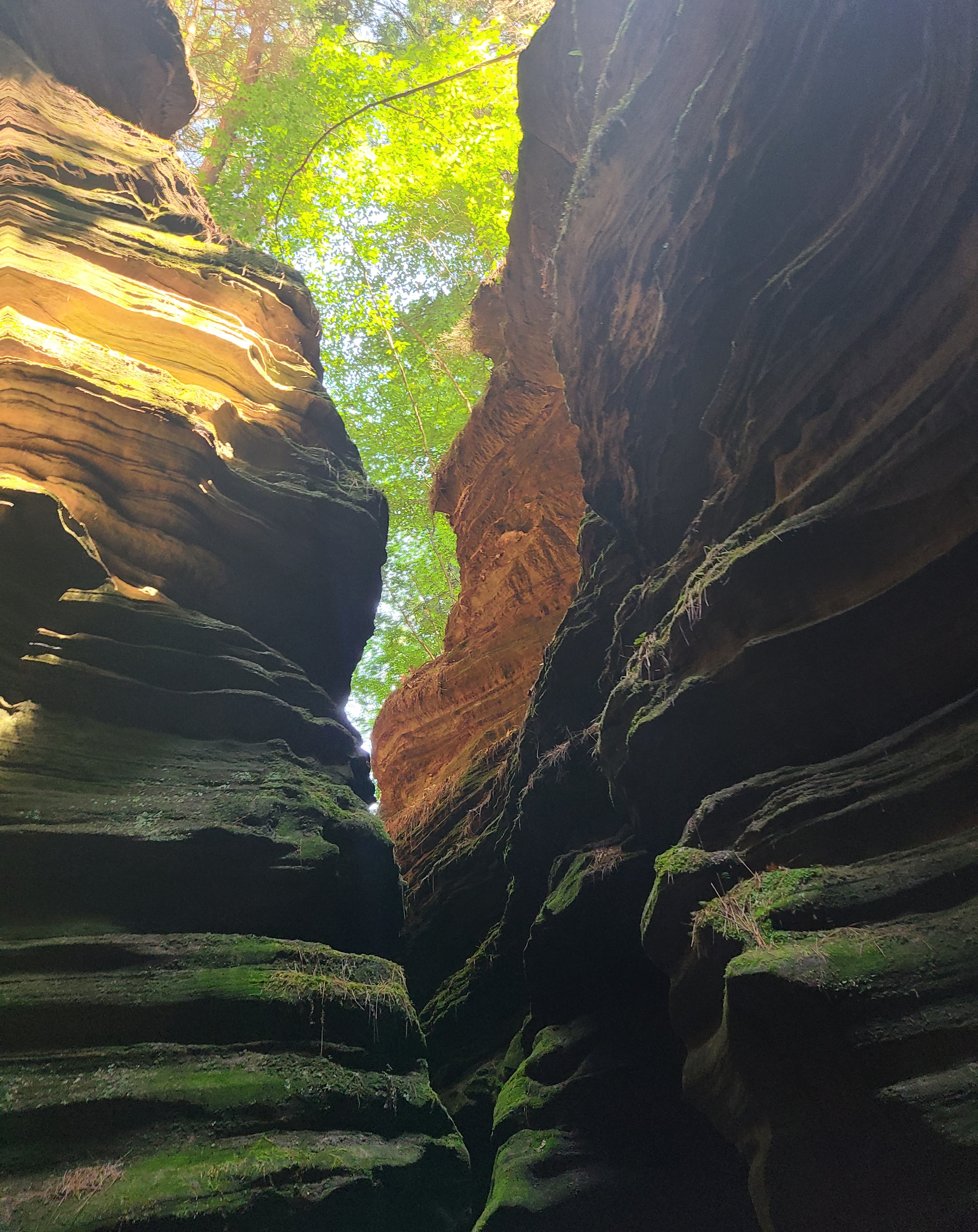
Rock formations at Witches Gulch

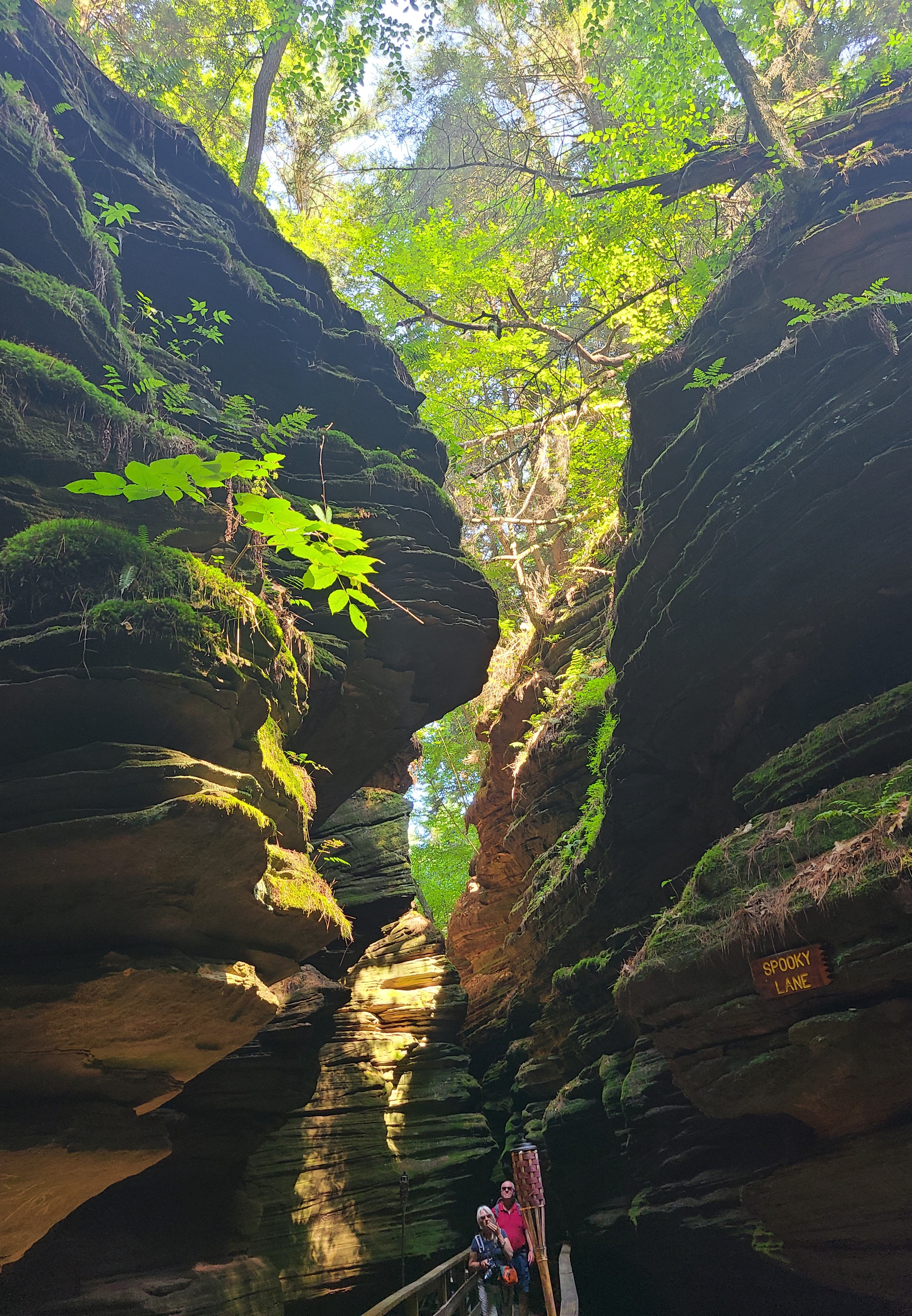
Witches Gulch with people for perspective

== See also ==
- Ice Age Trail
- Missoula Floods
