= Robert J. Keller =

American politician

Robert J. Keller (November 9, 1893 – December 6, 1944) was a member of the Wisconsin State Assembly.

== Biography ==
Keller was born on November 9, 1893, in Baraboo, Wisconsin. He attended Marquette University.

During World War I, he served with the 29th Infantry Division of the United States Army.

== Political career ==
Keller was a member of the Assembly during the 1929 and 1931 sessions. Additionally, he was Clerk and Attorney of the Village of Sauk City, Wisconsin.

== Personal life and death ==
Keller married Ramona Hartig in 1933; she preceded him in death. They had three children.

Keller died on December 6, 1944, of a heart attack at a veterans hospital near Madison, Wisconsin.
