= Kilbourn Dam =

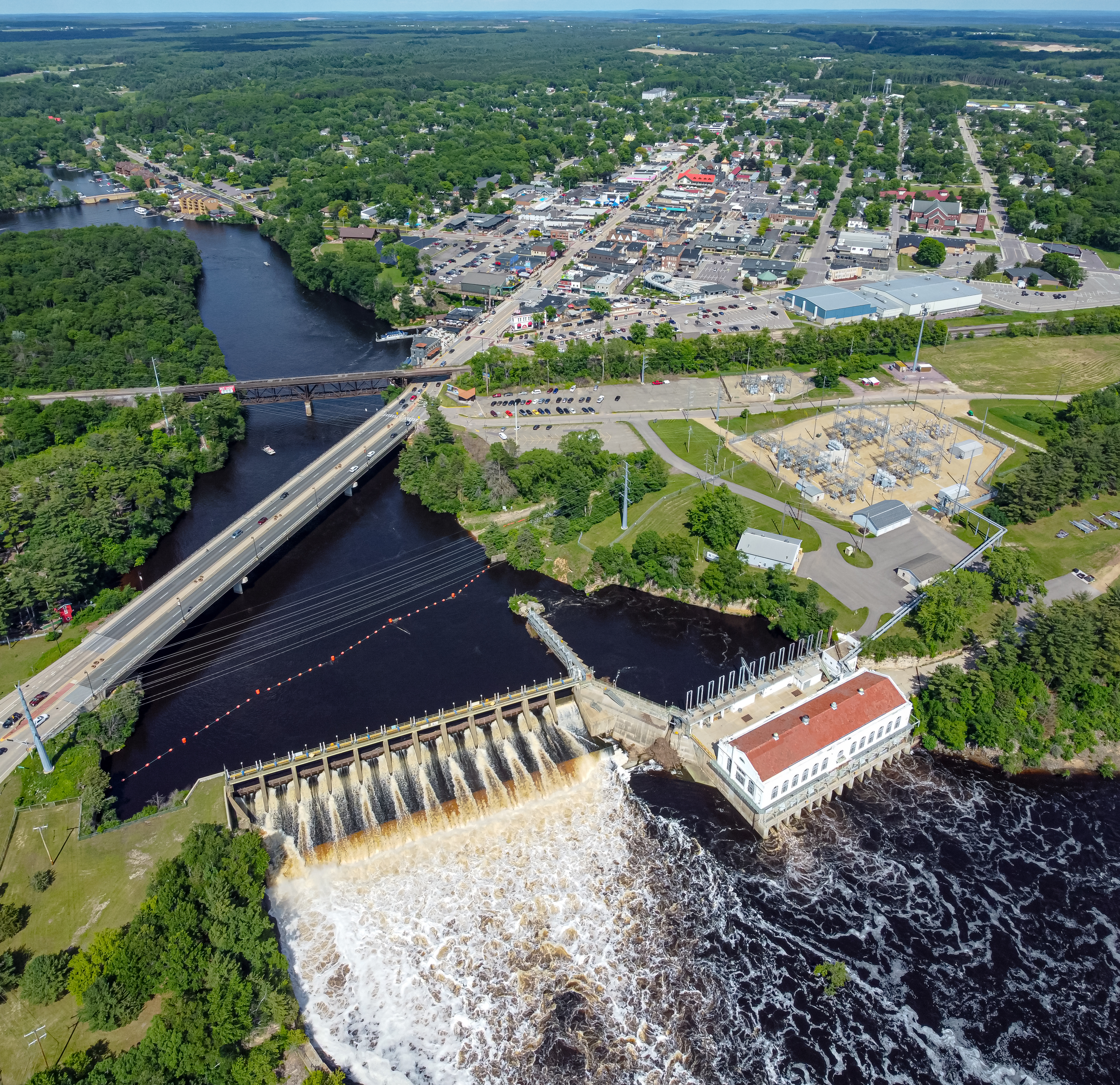

- Location in Wisconsin
- Location: Wisconsin Dells, Wisconsin
- Coordinates: 43.62672699°N 89.7812986°W
- Purpose: Power
- Construction began: December 1906
- Opening date: August 1909
- Operator: Alliant Energy

Dam and spillways
- Type of dam: Gravity dam
- Impounds: Wisconsin River
- Height: 61 ft (19 m)
- Length: 560 ft (170 m)

Reservoir
- Creates: Kilbourn Flowage
- Total capacity: 36,000 acre⋅ft (0.044 km^{3})

Power Station
- Installed capacity: 10MW

The Kilbourn Dam is a concrete hydroelectric dam on the Wisconsin River at Wisconsin Dells, Wisconsin. It is owned and operated by Alliant Energy.

== History ==
The Kilbourn Dam was the first major hydroelectric station on the Wisconsin River. It was named for its location in the city of Kilbourn, which changed its name to Wisconsin Dells in 1931. The dam was designed by Daniel W. Mead and built from 1906 to 1909 by the Southern Wisconsin Power Company, led by Magnus Swenson of Madison, Wisconsin and Bates & Rogers Construction of Chicago. The project was not initially profitable, leading the company to build the larger Prairie du Sac Dam downstream beginning in 1911. Wisconsin Power and Light, the predecessor of Alliant Energy, purchased the Kilbourn Dam in 1917.

The dam divided the Dells of the Wisconsin River into the Upper Dells and Lower Dells, obstructing river navigation between the two areas. The dam also raised the water level in the Upper Dells by around 17 feet (5.2 m), flooding popular caves and rock formations. For this reason, landscape photographer H. H. Bennett vocally opposed the dam's construction. Supporters of the dam have pointed to its benefits in generating renewable energy and maintaining an elevated water level for recreational boating.
