= Daniel W. Mead =

American engineering consultant and professor

Daniel Webster Mead (March 6, 1862 – October 13, 1948) was an American engineering consultant and professor at the University of Wisconsin-Madison. He is remembered for designing hydroelectric plants and writing early textbooks on hydraulic engineering and engineering ethics.

== Life and career ==
Mead was born in Fulton, Oswego County, New York in 1862 and grew up in Rockford, Illinois. He established the consulting firm Mead and Seastone in Chicago in 1900. In 1904, Mead was made head of the Department of Hydraulics and Sanitary Engineering at the University of Wisconsin–Madison. He moved his consulting practice to Madison, Wisconsin, where it grew into the engineering firm Mead & Hunt.

Mead contributed to the design of a number of hydraulic engineering projects. He was the principal designer of the Kilbourn Dam (1909) and Prairie du Sac Dam (1914), two hydroelectric plants on the Wisconsin River. In the 1910s he served as a consultant for flood control projects including the Huai River conservancy in Jiangsu and Anhui, China, and the Miami Conservancy District in Ohio. President Calvin Coolidge appointed Mead to the Colorado River Board commission to study the Hoover Dam project in 1928.

In 1921, Mead became the first president of the Technical Club of Madison. He later became president of the American Society of Civil Engineers (ASCE) in 1936, which recognizes him in the annual Daniel W. Mead essay contest. Mead's later career included a strong focus on engineering ethics, including writing a manual of professional ethics for ASCE in 1941.

== Publications ==
- "Water Power Engineering." New York: McGraw Publishing Co., 1908.
- Contracts, Specifications, and Engineering Relations. New York: McGraw-Hill, 1916.
- Hydrology: The Fundamental Basis of Hydraulic Engineering. New York: McGraw-Hill, 1919.
- "The Engineer and His Code," Civil Engineering 6, no. 8 (1936): pp. 499–501.
- Standards of professional relations and conduct. New York: American Society of Civil Engineers, 1941.
