= Prairie du Sac, Wisconsin =

- Village
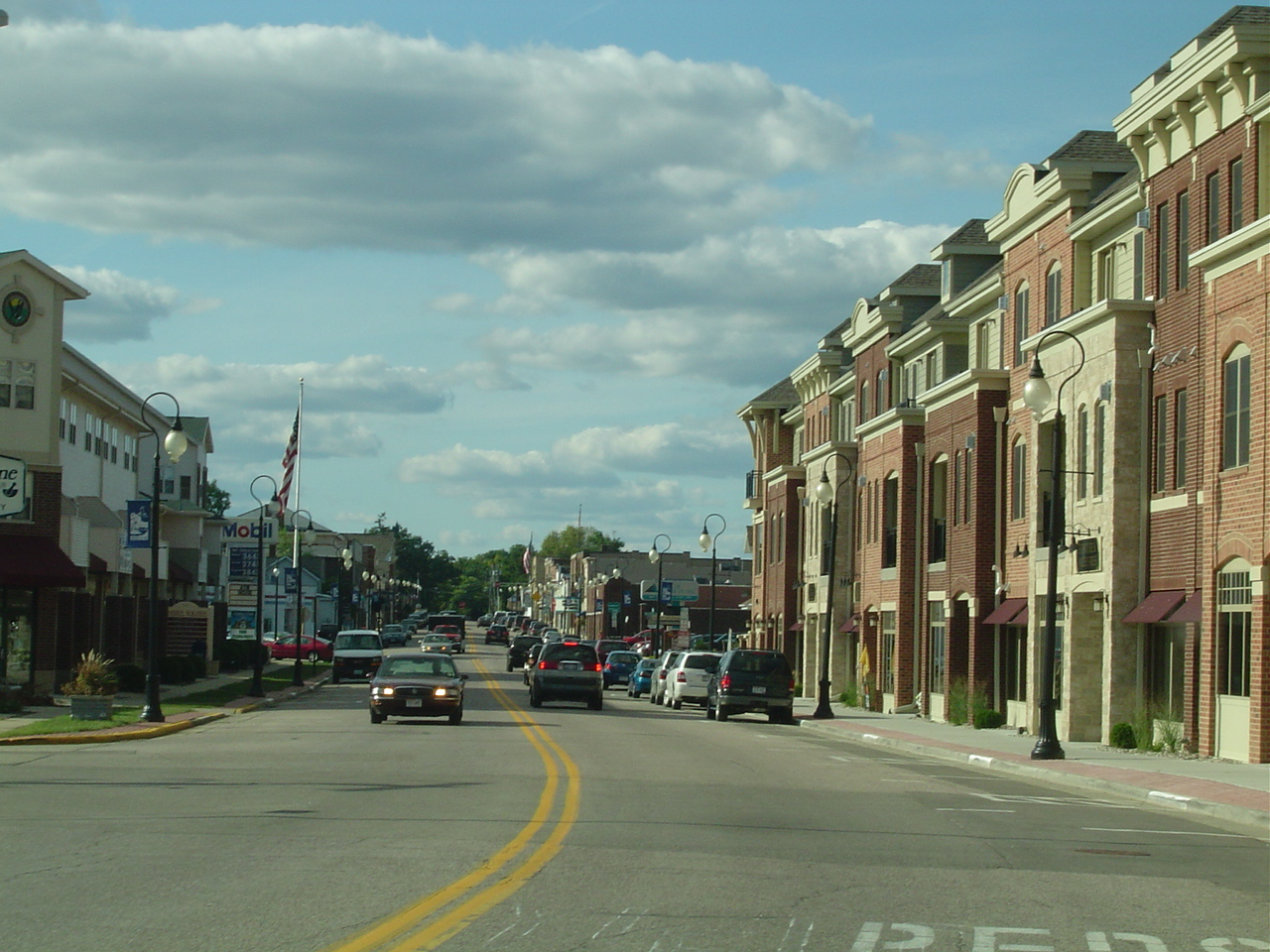
- Downtown Prairie du Sac

- Location of Prairie du Sac in Sauk County, Wisconsin.
- Coordinates: 43°16′44″N 89°47′16″W
- Country: United States
- State: Wisconsin
- County: Sauk

Government
  - Village President: Cheryl Sherman

Area
  - Total: 1.94 sq mi (5.03 km^{2})
  - Land: 1.82 sq mi (4.72 km^{2})
  - Water: 0.12 sq mi (0.31 km^{2})
- Elevation: 768 ft (234 m)

Population (2020)
  - Total: 4,420
  - Density: 2,430.5/sq mi (938.41/km^{2})
- Time zone: UTC-6 (Central (CST))
  - Summer (DST): UTC-5 (CDT)
- Area code: 608
- FIPS code: 55-65100
- GNIS feature ID: 1571875
- Website: http://www.prairiedusac.net

Prairie du Sac is a village in Sauk County, Wisconsin, United States, located along the Wisconsin River. The population was 4,420 at the 2020 census. The village is surrounded by the Town of Prairie du Sac, the Wisconsin River, and the village of Sauk City; together, Prairie du Sac and Sauk City are referred to as Sauk Prairie.

== History ==
Prairie du Sac named because the area was in the large Wisconsin River Valley where the Sauk Indians had a large settlement. Although the name of the village dates from the early days of French fur traders, Prairie du Sac was established as a village by D.B. Crocker in 1840, largely as a Yankee-English village, in contrast to its neighbor, Sauk City, which was settled largely by Germans.

The hydroelectric Prairie du Sac Dam was completed just north of the village in 1914, creating Lake Wisconsin.

== Geography ==
Prairie du Sac is located at 43°17′23″N 89°43′42″W (43.289833, -89.728524).

According to the United States Census Bureau, the village has a total area of 1.94 square miles (5.02 km^{2}), of which 1.82 square miles (4.71 km^{2}) is land and 0.12 square miles (0.31 km^{2}) is water.

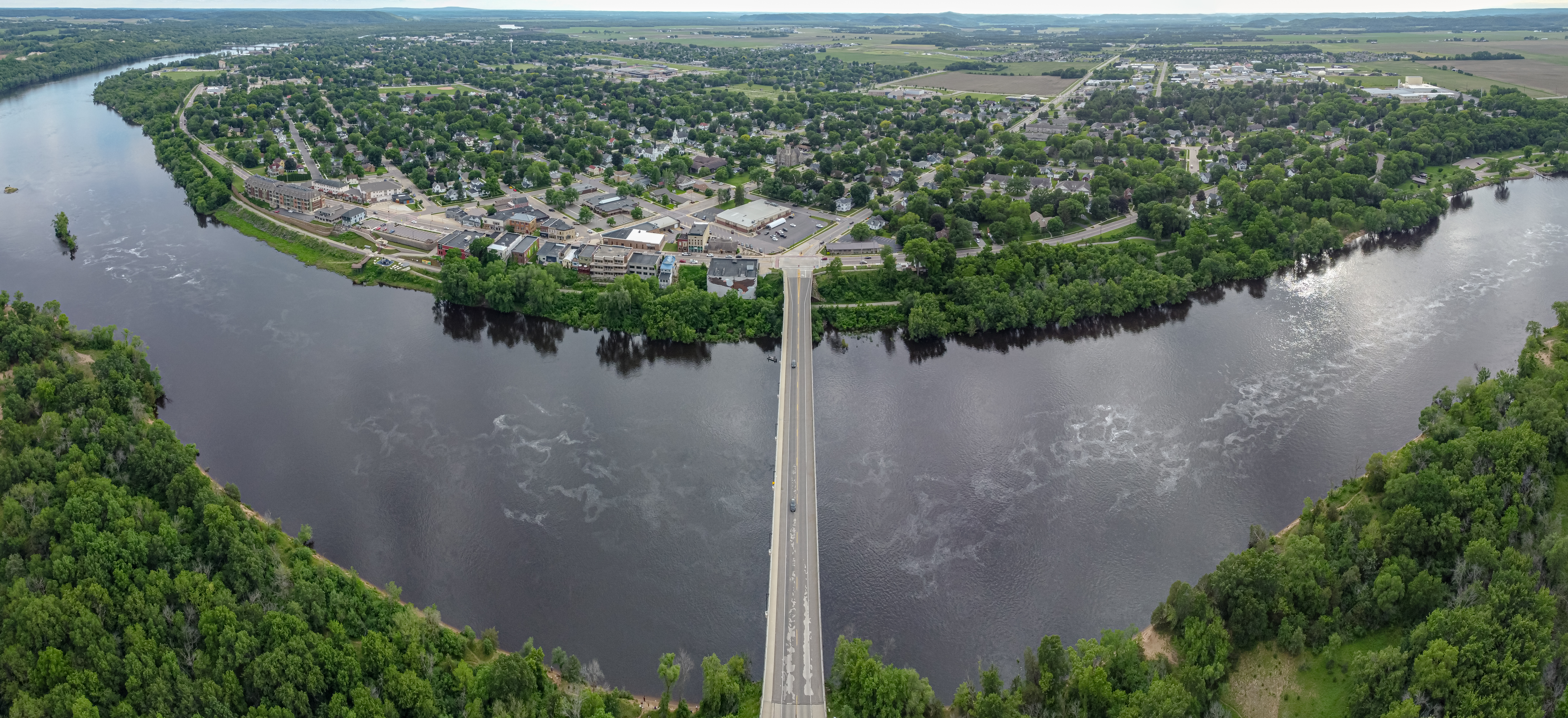
Wis-60/188 crossing the Wisconsin River into Prairie Du Sac

== Demographics ==
Historical population
| Census | Pop. | Note | %± |
|---|---|---|---|
| 1850 | 168 | | — |
| 1880 | 433 | | — |
| 1890 | 562 | | 29.8% |
| 1900 | 656 | | 16.7% |
| 1910 | 699 | | 6.6% |
| 1920 | 866 | | 23.9% |
| 1930 | 949 | | 9.6% |
| 1940 | 1,001 | | 5.5% |
| 1950 | 1,402 | | 40.1% |
| 1960 | 1,676 | | 19.5% |
| 1970 | 1,902 | | 13.5% |
| 1980 | 2,145 | | 12.8% |
| 1990 | 2,380 | | 11.0% |
| 2000 | 3,231 | | 35.8% |
| 2010 | 3,972 | | 22.9% |
| 2020 | 4,420 | | 11.3% |
U.S. Decennial Census

=== 2020 census ===
As of the census of 2020, the population was 4,420. The population density was 2,424.6 inhabitants per square mile (936.1/km^{2}). There were 1,885 housing units at an average density of 1,034.0 per square mile (399.2/km^{2}). The racial makeup of the village was 91.4% White, 0.6% Asian, 0.6% Black or African American, 0.2% Native American, 1.8% from other races, and 5.4% from two or more races. Ethnically, the population was 5.2% Hispanic or Latino of any race.

=== 2010 census ===
As of the census of 2010, there were 3,972 people, 1,649 households, and 1,075 families living in the village. The population density was 2,562.6 inhabitants per square mile (989.4/km^{2}). There were 1,733 housing units at an average density of 1,118.1 per square mile (431.7/km^{2}). The racial makeup of the village was 94.3% White, 0.6% African American, 0.3% Native American, 0.6% Asian, 2.7% from other races, and 1.5% from two or more races. Hispanic or Latino of any race were 4.8% of the population.

There were 1,649 households, of which 35.1% had children under the age of 18 living with them, 50.6% were married couples living together, 10.6% had a female householder with no husband present, 3.9% had a male householder with no wife present, and 34.8% were non-families. 28.6% of all households were made up of individuals, and 12.8% had someone living alone who was 65 years of age or older. The average household size was 2.41 and the average family size was 2.96.

The median age in the village was 36.2 years. 25.8% of residents were under the age of 18; 7.2% were between the ages of 18 and 24; 29.5% were from 25 to 44; 24.5% were from 45 to 64; and 13% were 65 years of age or older. The gender makeup of the village was 48.4% male and 51.6% female.

=== 2000 census ===
As of the census of 2000, there were 3,231 people, 1,290 households, and 869 families living in the village. The population density was 2,450.9 people per square mile (945.1/km^{2}). There were 1,332 housing units at an average density of 1,010.4 per square mile (389.6/km^{2}). The racial makeup of the village was 98.14% White, 0.12% Black or African American, 0.22% Native American, 0.31% Asian, 0.46% from other races, and 0.74% from two or more races. 2.04% of the population were Hispanic or Latino of any race.

There were 1,290 households, out of which 34.3% had children under the age of 18 living with them, 54.8% were married couples living together, 8.7% had a female householder with no husband present, and 32.6% were non-families. 25.5% of all households were made up of individuals, and 10.6% had someone living alone who was 65 years of age or older. The average household size was 2.50 and the average family size was 3.04.

In the village, the population was spread out, with 27.8% under the age of 18, 7.8% from 18 to 24, 32.1% from 25 to 44, 19.9% from 45 to 64, and 12.5% who were 65 years of age or older. The median age was 35 years. For every 100 females, there were 96.2 males. For every 100 females age 18 and over, there were 92.3 males.

The median income for a household in the village was $44,472, and the median income for a family was $55,234. Males had a median income of $35,020 versus $28,882 for females. The per capita income for the village was $23,068. About 4.7% of families and 7.4% of the population were below the poverty line, including 13.3% of those under age 18 and 3.9% of those age 65 or over.

== Government ==
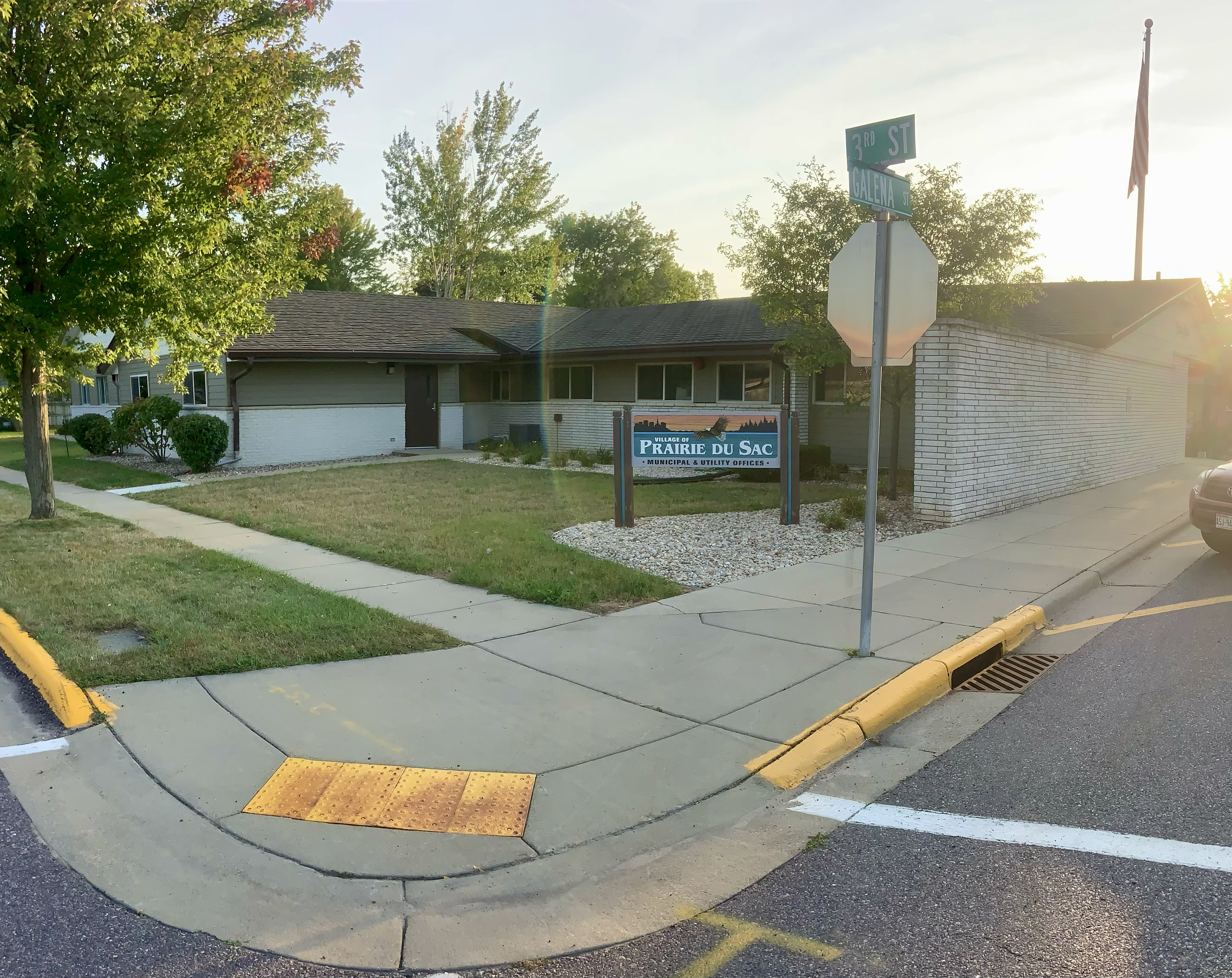
Prairie Du Sac Village Hall

== Economy ==
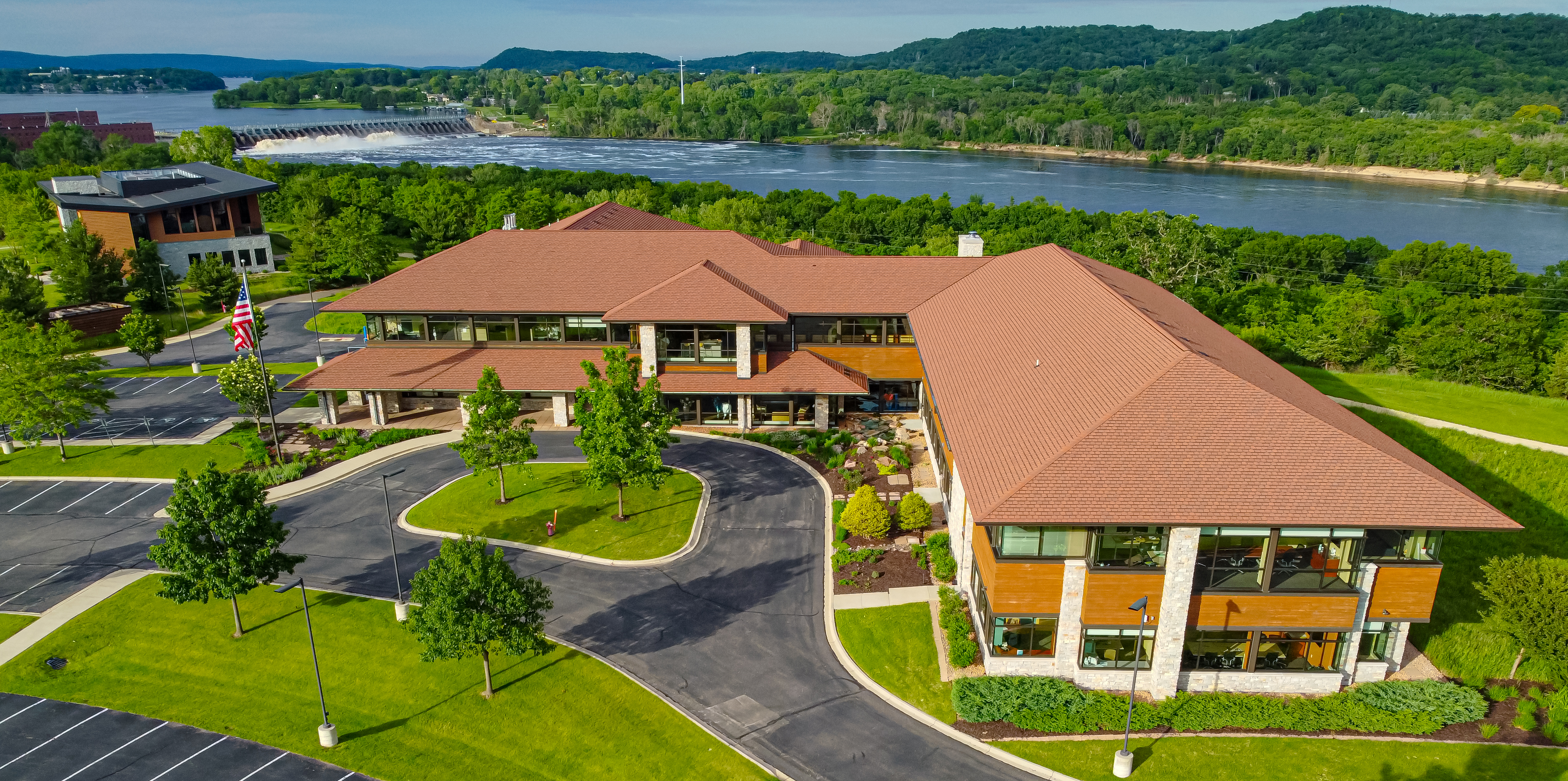
Culver's headquarters

The corporate headquarters of Culver's Franchising Systems, Inc. is located in Prairie du Sac. The first Culver's restaurant opened in the adjacent village of Sauk City on July 18, 1984. The corporate headquarters of Mueller Sports Medicine is also in Prairie du Sac. Milwaukee Valve has a factory there as well.

== Transportation ==
Prairie du Sac is serviced by the Sauk–Prairie Airport (91C).

== Notable people ==
- Paul Gruber, former Tampa Bay Buccaneers offensive tackle; Ring of Honor inductee
- Peter A. Hemmy, Wisconsin State Representative
- George DeGraw Moore, Wisconsin State Senator and New Jersey jurist
- J. B. Ragatz, Wisconsin State Representative
- Scott Schutt, former Cincinnati Bengals player

== See also ==
- Badger Army Ammunition Plant
- Sauk Prairie High School
