= Scott Schutt =

American football player (born 1963)

No. 59
- Position: Linebacker

Personal information
- Born: August 31, 1963 (age 63); Prairie du Sac, Wisconsin, U.S.
- Listed height: 6 ft 4 in (1.93 m)
- Listed weight: 218 lb (99 kg)

Career information
- High school: Sauk Prairie
- College: North Dakota State
- NFL draft: 1987: undrafted

Career history
- New England Patriots (1987)*; Cincinnati Bengals (1987)
- * Offseason or practice squad member only

Career NFL statistics
- Sacks: 1
- Safeties: 1
- Stats at Pro Football Reference

Scott Joseph Schutt (born August 31, 1963) is an American former professional football player in the National Football League (NFL) for the Cincinnati Bengals in 1987. During his brief NFL career as a linebacker, Schutt played in three games and scored two points on a safety. He played at the college level at North Dakota State University.

== Early life ==
Schutt was born in Prairie du Sac, Wisconsin. Schutt then was a math teacher at Sauk Prairie High School.
