= Prairie du Sac Dam =

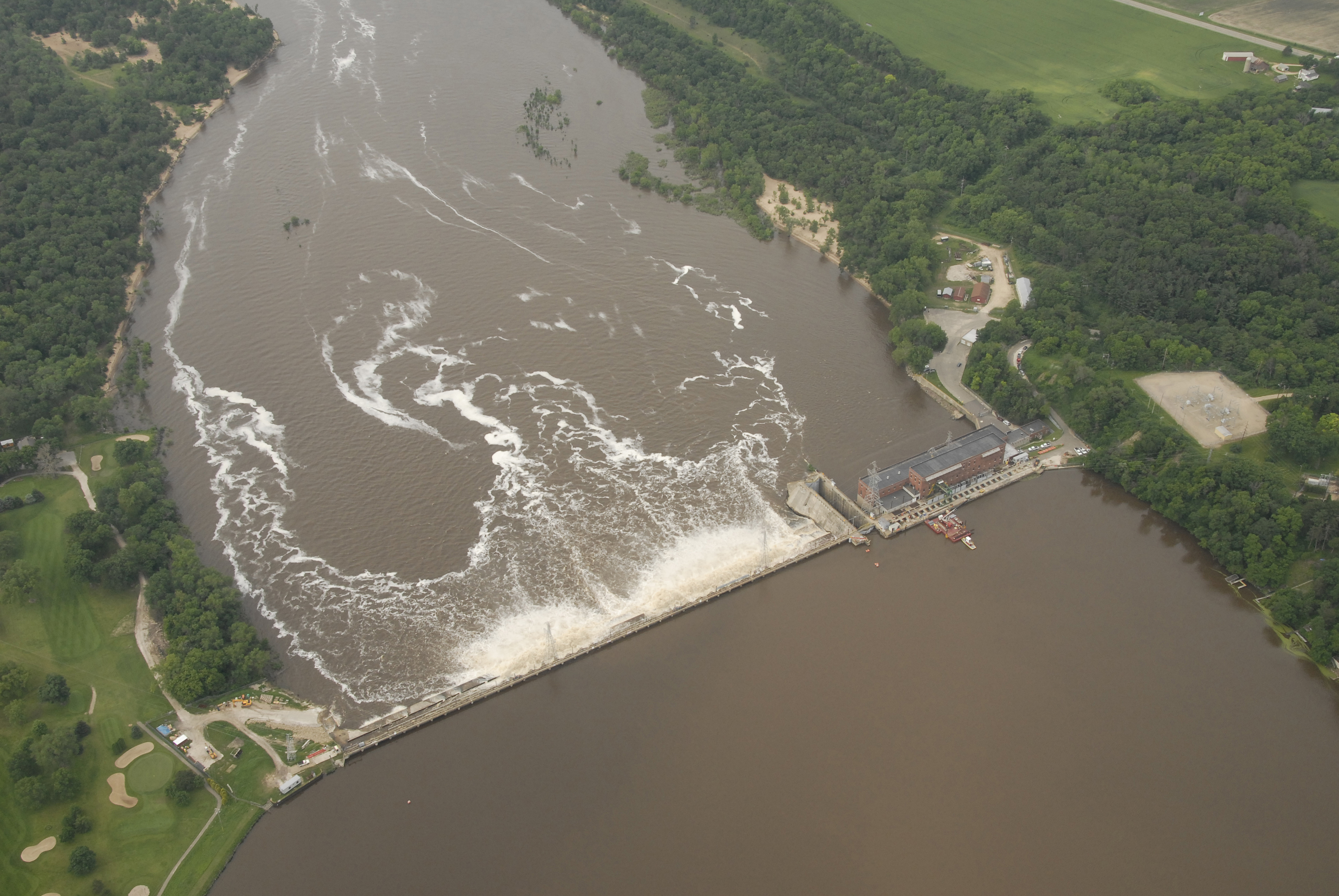
- Aerial view of the Prairie du Sac Dam taken during a June 2008 flood.

- Location in Wisconsin
- Location: North of Prairie du Sac, Wisconsin
- Coordinates: 43.3101°N 89.7253°W
- Purpose: Power
- Construction began: January 1911
- Opening date: September 1914
- Designed by: Daniel W. Mead
- Operator: Alliant Energy

Dam and spillways
- Type of dam: Gravity dam
- Impounds: Wisconsin River
- Height: 50 ft (15 m)
- Length: 3,247 ft (990 m)

Reservoir
- Creates: Lake Wisconsin
- Total capacity: 193,200 acre⋅ft (0.2383 km^{3})

Power Station
- Installed capacity: 31 MW

The Prairie du Sac Dam is a hydroelectric dam on the Wisconsin River just north of Prairie du Sac, Wisconsin. It is owned and operated by Alliant Energy. The dam forms Lake Wisconsin. It is the last dam on the Wisconsin River before its confluence with the Mississippi River about 92 miles (148 km) downstream, and it marks the upper end of the Lower Wisconsin State Riverway.

== History ==
The dam was designed by Daniel W. Mead for the Southern Wisconsin Power Company led by Magnus Swenson. The company had completed the Kilbourn Dam upriver at Wisconsin Dells in 1909, but found it unprofitable, leading to the decision to build a larger dam at Prairie du Sac. Construction of the new dam began in the winter of 1911 with general contractor J. O. Heyworth of Chicago and a crew of around 400 laborers.

The construction of the Prairie du Sac Dam involved several engineering challenges. The width of the Wisconsin River and its bed of shifting sands required a deep foundation. Workers used steam-powered pile drivers to drive more than 11,000 timber pilings deep into the riverbed, and buried steel sheet piling across the river at the front and back of the dam. They then covered the array of wood pilings with rock and concrete to form a stable base for the dam and power station. Crews obtained the rock and gravel from a nearby quarry. The large volume of material required a purpose-built narrow-gauge railway with a Woodford remote-controlled electric third rail. Temporary trestle bridges linked the construction site to the quarry and cement plant.

Flooding and ice jams delayed progress on the dam's construction, but it began to generate power in September 1914. The power station utilized eight Allis-Chalmers generators. The electrical output was originally routed to Milwaukee, Wisconsin. In 1917, Wisconsin Power and Light, the predecessor of Alliant Energy, purchased the dam and began distributing the electricity to more local markets.

The dam and its timber pile foundation have held in place for more than one hundred years, including through the June 2008 Midwest Floods that destroyed Lake Delton upstream. In 2017, Alliant Energy began a project to reinforce the original wood pilings with additional steel micropiles as a preventative measure to extend the life of the structure. In 2022 the company also began a multi-year project to replace the dam's original steel spillway gates.

== Structure ==
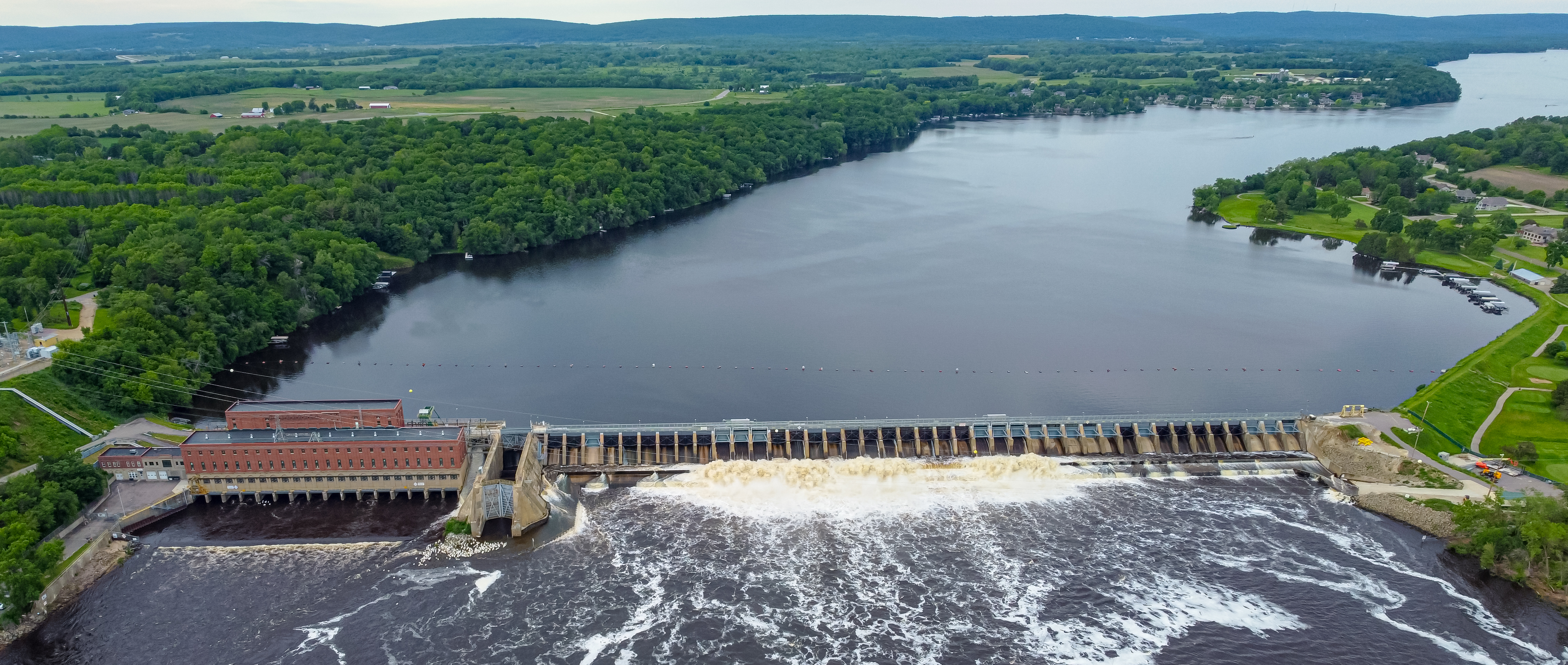
Prairie du Sac Dam

The Prairie du Sac Dam is the widest dam on the Wisconsin River and has a generation capacity of about 31 MW. The dam has a hollow concrete structure and is anchored to the sandy riverbed by a pile foundation. The hydroelectric power station is a 330-foot-long (100 m), three story red brick structure at the west end of the dam. Adjoining the power station is a single 35 ft (11 m) by 170 ft (52 m) lock intended to allow continued navigation of the Fox-Wisconsin Waterway, but it is no longer in service. The main crest of the dam is about 1,000 feet (300 m) long and includes a spillway consisting of 41 steel tainter gates, each fourteen feet (4.3 m) wide, separated by concrete buttresses. The east end of the dam extends into a 1,700-foot-long (520 m) earth embankment.
