= Freethinkers' Hall =

Historic church in Sauk City, Wisconsin, US

- Freethinkers Hall
- U.S. National Register of Historic Places
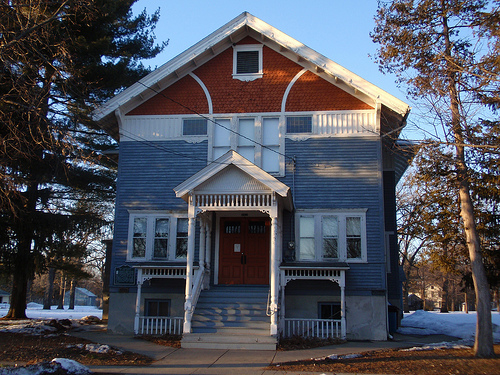

- Location within Wisconsin Location within the United States
- Location: 309 Polk St., Sauk City, Wisconsin
- Coordinates: 43°16′34″N 89°43′28″W
- Area: 2 acres (0.81 ha)
- Built: 1884
- Architect: Alfred Charles Clas
- Architectural style: Queen Anne
- NRHP reference No.: 88000237
- Added to NRHP: March 31, 1988

Freethinkers Hall, also known as Park Hall, is a meeting hall in Sauk City, Wisconsin. Designed by Alfred Clas, Freethinkers Hall was built in 1884 for the local Freethinkers congregation, or Freie Gemeinde in German. The congregation had been formed by German immigrants in 1852, and became the last extant Freethinker congregation in North America. It affiliated with the American Unitarian Association in 1955. The group meets in the hall to this day.

== See also ==
- List of Unitarian, Universalist, and Unitarian Universalist churches
