= Great Sauk State Trail =

Bike trail in Sauk County, Wisconsin, US

Great Sauk State Trail is a bike trail in Sauk County, Wisconsin. The trail was built in 2017 on a former Milwaukee Road railroad line. The trail begins in Sauk City at the Wisconsin River and ends just south of Devil's Lake State Park. The trail will eventually connect with the existing 400 State Trail in Reedsburg.
