= Sauk Prairie High School =

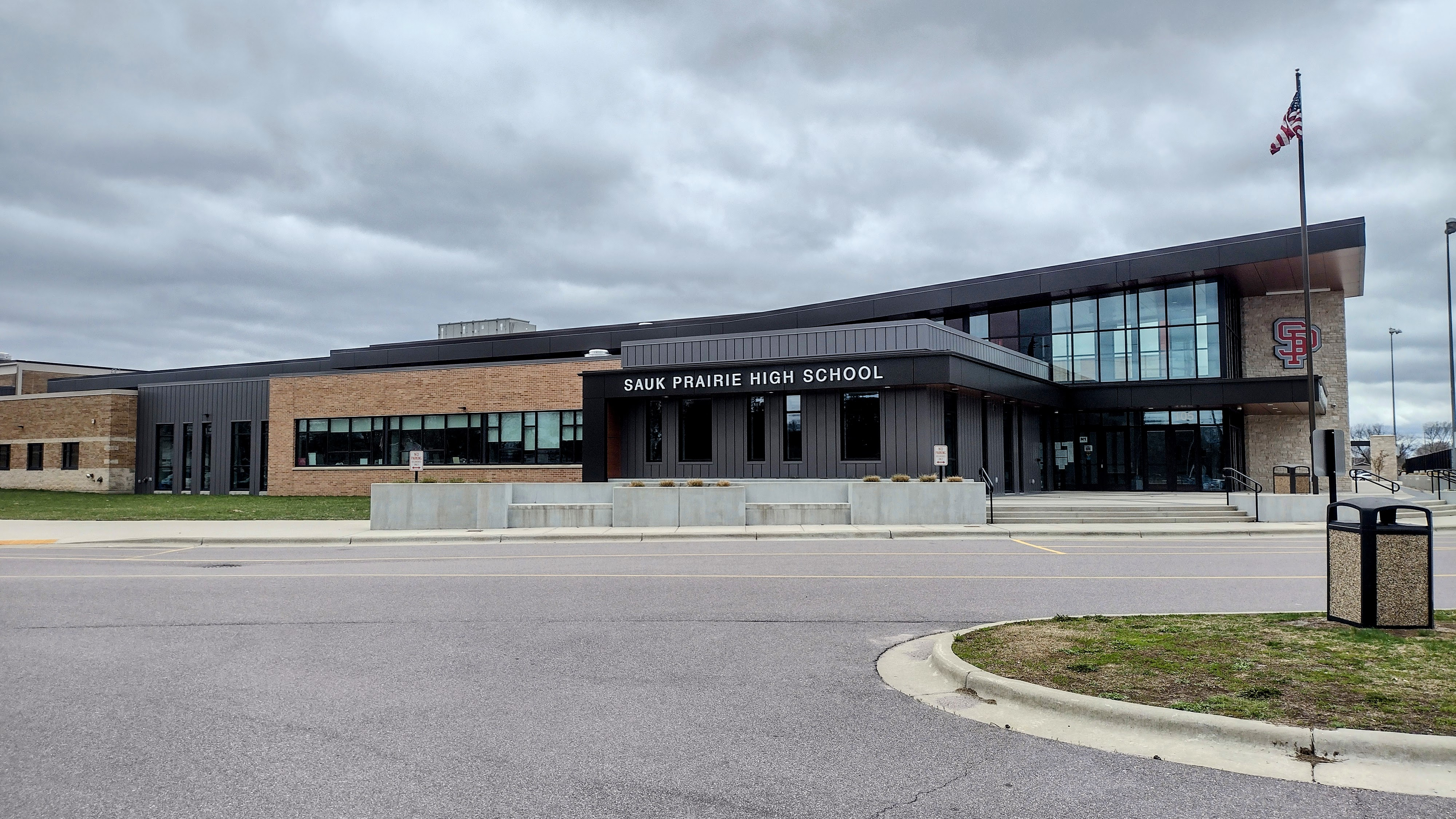

Location
- 105 Ninth Street; Prairie du Sac, Wisconsin; United States; 43°17′1″N 89°44′50″W

Information
- Type: Public Secondary
- Established: 1965
- School district: Sauk Prairie School District
- Principal: Chad Harnisch
- Teaching staff: 61.45 (FTE)
- Grades: 9–12
- Gender: Coed
- Enrollment: 873 (2023–2024)
- Student to teacher ratio: 14.21
- Colors: Red, black, and white
- Nickname: Eagles
- Rival: Baraboo High School
- Yearbook: Eagle Echo
- Website: https://high.saukprairieschools.org/o/high

Sauk Prairie High School is a public high school located in Prairie du Sac, Wisconsin. It is part of the Sauk Prairie School District.

== River Arts Center ==
The River Arts Center section of the high school was opened in 2000. The building has a gallery for displaying artwork created by students and a theater where most of the school's plays and concerts are performed.

== Extracurricular activities ==
=== Athletics ===
Athletic teams include:

- Boys' and girls' cross country
- Boys' soccer
- Boys' and girls' swimming and diving
- Boys' tennis
- Boys' and girls' track
- Boys' and girls' basketball
- Boys' and girls' hockey
- Boys' lacrosse, Division 2 State Champions 2011, 2017
- Golf
- Mountain Biking, Division 2 State Champions 2022
- Girls' soccer
- Girls' tennis
- Football
- Football cheerleading
- Dance team
- Gymnastics
- Baseball
- Softball
- Volleyball, Division 2 State Champions 2025 (girls)
- Wrestling

Sauk Prairie has a rivalry with the Baraboo Thunderbirds. The two schools, both members of the Badger North Conference, play each other annually for the "Mega Bowl Trophy" in football. Sauk Prairie has also had a long rivalry with the Lodi Blue Devils, even though the teams play in separate conferences. In basketball, the "Wisconsin River Classic" is played between Sauk Prairie and Lodi. They Battle for the Paddle. The paddle is blue on one side and red on the other. Sauk leads the trophy series 4-2, losing to Lodi in 2019, 61–53. SPHS won state championships in boys cross country in 1968 and 1969.

==== Athletic conference affiliation history ====
- South Central Conference (1963-1977)
- Badger Conference (1977–present)

== History ==
The construction of the Sauk Prairie High School would be completed in 1964; this being three years after it was agreed upon in a referendum vote to merge the formally separate Sauk City High School and Prairie du Sac High School, due to increasing student sizes and struggles with keeping maintenance over the two buildings. Before this consolidation, the Sauk City High School had placed great emphasis on music, routinely having hired tutors from Madison to assist in classes. They also emphasized various subjects ranging from woodworking and home economics; to more broad subjects such as ancient and medieval history, physics, and physiology. The Prairie du Sac High School meanwhile, had been frequently used to host major social events in the community, such as sport competitions, farm bureau meetings, and political rallies. Before the merge, the Sauk City High School athletics teams went by the Sauk City Cardinals, while the Prairie du Sac High School's went by the Prairie du Sac Indians; after the merge they would then go by the Sauk Prairie Eagles.

== Notable alumni ==
- Paul Gruber, former NFL player
- Greg Jensen, former NFL player
- Scott Schutt, former NFL player
- Dirk Been, Cast member of Survivor

== See also ==
- List of high schools in Wisconsin
