= Masonite International =

American interior door manufacturer

- Founded: 1925; 101 years ago
- Founder: William H. Mason
- Headquarters: Tampa, Florida, United States
- Owner: Owens Corning (2024–present)
- Website: www.masonite.com

Masonite International Corporation is a designer, manufacturer and distributor of interior and exterior doors for the new construction and repair, renovation and remodeling sectors of the residential and non-residential building construction markets.

Founded in 1925 in Laurel, Mississippi, it currently serves approximately 8,500 customers in 60 countries and is headquartered in Tampa, Florida. On May 14, 2024, Masonite International was acquired by Owens-Corning.

== History ==
=== 1924—1940: Invention of Masonite ===
In 1924, William H. Mason, an engineer, inventor and apprentice of Thomas A. Edison, developed an innovative method for turning vast amounts of waste wood into useful products. By applying heat, steam and pressure to wood fiber, Mason created a type of hardboard known as Masonite that has since become an enduring material in the building products industry.

Mason received funding from lumber companies in Wisconsin and Laurel, Mississippi to establish the Mason Fibre Company in 1925, which would later adopt the Masonite Corporation name. In late 1925, construction was started on the company's first plant in Laurel to produce insulation board and Mason’s newly created hardboard.

Masonite soon licensed facilities in Australia, Canada, Italy and Sweden to ramp up hardboard production. As the company grew, Mason increased the products’ performance and strength, and he was awarded numerous patents connected with Masonite.

=== 1940—1970: Wartime contributions and wide-scale use ===
During World War II, Masonite’s hardboard became an important substitute for metals. The Army and Navy depended on the product to develop Quonset huts for soldier housing throughout the European and Pacific war theatres. For these efforts, Masonite Corporation earned three Army-Navy Production Awards.

After the war, Masonite looked to broaden the use of its hardboard. The product was used to create shipping containers, toys, artwork, furniture and more. Designers Charles and Ray Eames used Masonite hardboard in their popular line of postwar modernist furniture, including pieces designed for Herman Miller, Inc.

The Masonite Innovation Center (formerly known as the John M. Coates Technical Center) was built in 1960. Its sole purpose was, and continues to be, the development of new products and process innovations.

=== 1970—2001: Foray into doors ===
Masonite entered the door business in 1972, when it began producing wood-composite molded door facings and other components. In 1982, the Masonite Corporation spun off its timber property. In 1984, USG acquired Masonite. In 1988, USG sold Masonite to International Paper.

The company formed an alliance with Premdor, a Toronto-based door supplier. By the 1990s, Masonite had become Premdor's largest supplier. Premdor reached an agreement to purchase Masonite from International Paper in September 2000. One year later, regulatory approval was granted, and the deal was completed.

=== 2002—2013: Origins of modern masonite ===
Premdor officially changed its name to Masonite on January 1, 2002 and adopted the tagline of “The Beautiful Door.”

In 2005, Masonite was acquired by KKR in a leveraged buy-out. Four years later, Masonite filed for bankruptcy protection afforded by Chapter 11 statutes in the U.S. and the CCAA in Canada as part of a pre-arranged plan to restructure the company. Masonite emerged from a pre-arranged bankruptcy filing 85 days later, in June 2009.

In 2013, Masonite filed a registration statement with the United States Securities and Exchange Commission and listed on the NYSE under the ticker symbol DOOR, to once again become a public company.

=== 2014 — Present: global expansion and innovation ===
Nearly a decade later, Masonite has grown into a global company with operations in eight countries serving customers across 64 countries. Headquartered in Tampa, Florida, Masonite employs more than 10,000 people worldwide, and is the only door manufacturer to serve both the residential and architectural markets.

Many of Masonite’s interior and exterior doors are developed at the Masonite Innovation Center (MIC) located in West Chicago, Illinois. The facility houses various testing and research labs and is recognized as the largest private research and development center dedicated specifically to door technology. The facility’s goal is to give Masonite an industry edge by developing environmentally friendly door solutions that help reduce energy consumption by providing insulating properties, ensure the safety and security of buildings through fire and storms and contribute to third-party sustainable building certifications.

In 2022, Mason International opened a new plant in Stoke-on-Trent, England.

In December 2023, Masonite International planned an acquisition of PGT Innovations, a manufacturer and supplier of windows and doors, for $3 billion. However, in January 2024 this agreement was terminated.
