= Louis Penfield House =

Historic house in Willoughby Hills, Ohio

- Louis A. Penfield House
- U.S. National Register of Historic Places
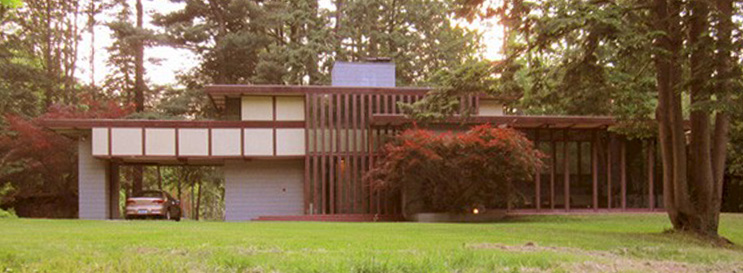

- Location within Ohio Location within the United States
- Interactive map of Louis A. Penfield House
- Location: 2203 River Road; Willoughby Hills, Ohio
- Coordinates: 41°37′07.8″N 81°24′30.4″W
- Built: 1955
- Architect: Frank Lloyd Wright
- Architectural style: Usonian style
- NRHP reference No.: 96001622
- Added to NRHP: February 7, 1997

The Louis Penfield House is located at 2203 River Road in Willoughby Hills, a suburb of Cleveland, Ohio, United States. One of nine Usonian homes in Ohio designed by Frank Lloyd Wright, the Penfield House was built for the art teacher Louis Penfield. The two-story house is made of wood panels and concrete blocks, with large glass windows on the exterior. It includes an open-air carport, a combined living–dining–kitchen area on the first floor, and three bedrooms above the kitchen. Since Penfield wanted the house to accommodate his 6-foot-8-inch (203 cm) stature, the house has higher doorways than many other buildings designed by Wright. The house is on the National Register of Historic Places.

Louis Penfield commissioned the house in 1952, and it was completed in 1955. Penfield also commissioned Wright to design a second house on the site, known as RiverRock, which was postponed due to a lack of funds. The family moved out in the 1990s and maintained it as a rental property for five years. Starting in 1998, Louis's son Paul restored the Penfield House for $100,000. Paul started renting the house out to guests in 2003 and placed it for sale in 2014. The Dykstra family bought the house in 2018 and decided to construct RiverRock, which was finished in 2025.

== Description ==
The Louis Penfield House is located at 2203 River Road along the Chagrin River in Willoughby Hills, a suburb of Cleveland, Ohio, United States. It is one of nine Usonian–style homes that Wright designed in Ohio, as well as one of eleven houses that Wright is known to have designed in that state. The house, occupying a 30-acre (12 ha) plot, has 1,800 square feet (170 m^{2}) with three bedrooms. The interior dimensions were adapted specifically to accommodate the stature of its original owner, Louis Penfield, who was 6 feet 8 inches (203 cm) tall.

The Penfield House is simpler than Wright's earlier Prairie style homes. It lacks a basement, being constructed directly on a concrete-slab foundation. Like much of Frank Lloyd Wright's earlier work, the building is low to the ground, with horizontal design elements. It is made of wood panels and concrete blocks, in addition to light cemesto board.

=== Exterior ===
The facade includes vertical strips of wood, and both horizontal and vertical joints. The wood is stained red, while the concrete is stained yellow. The facade also contains a red tile, on which Wright signed the initials "FLLW". Floor-to-ceiling windows measure 12 and 16 feet (3.7 and 4.9 m) wide. A Chicago Tribune writer said that Wright had intended for the window heights to "echo its owner", and Wright himself wanted the large windows to visually blur the distinction between exterior and interior. The kitchen section of the house has clerestory windows that cool the house down during the summer.

The flat roof, which is coated in crushed rock and tar, protrudes from the facade and is split across two levels. Wright intended these eaves to create a "sheltered effect". In lieu of a garage, the house includes an attached, open-air carport, which is covered by the lower section of the roof. A bamboo garden conceals the house's gas well.

=== Interior ===
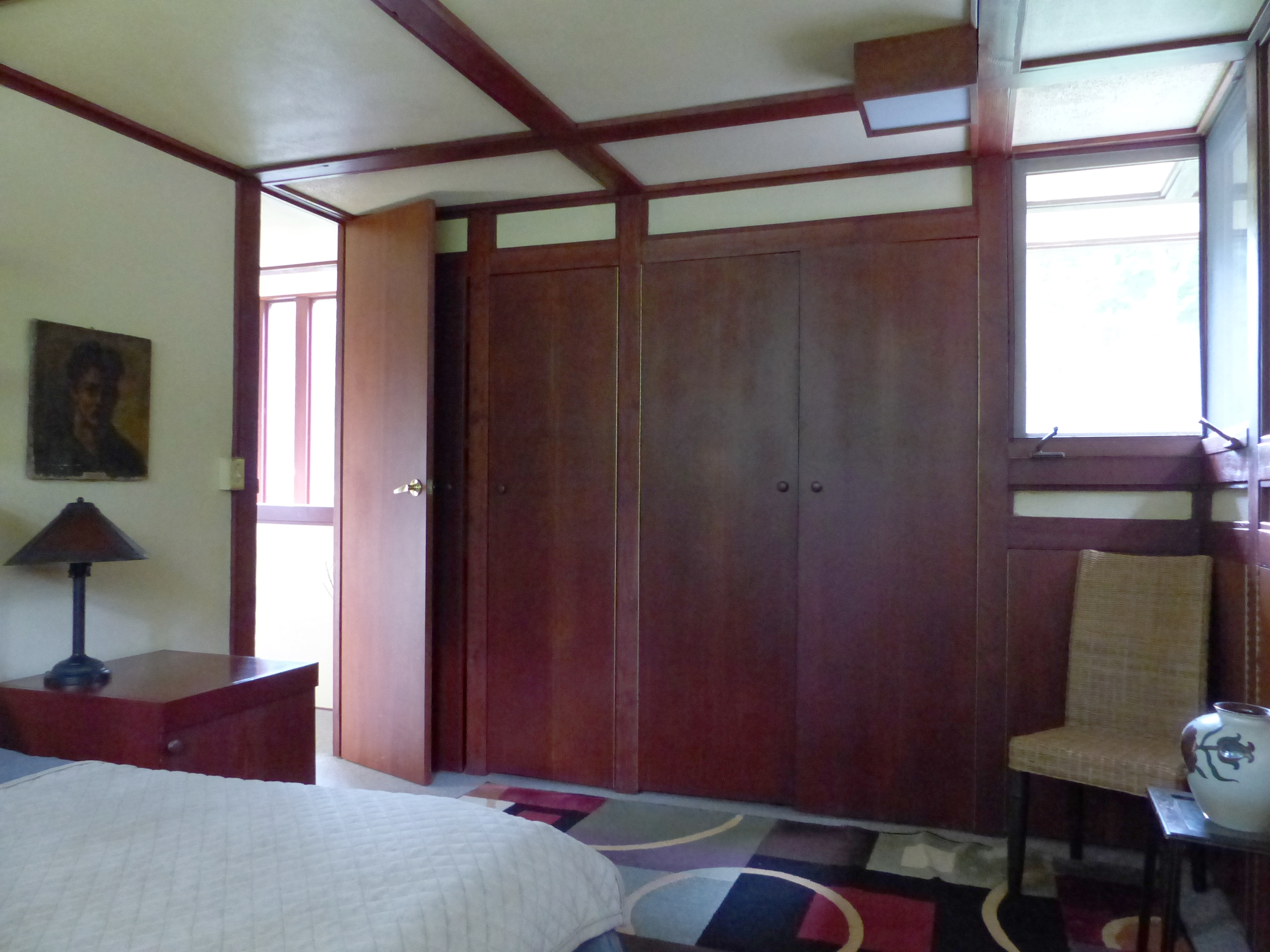
One of the bedrooms

The house's doorways are much higher than in other residences designed by Wright. The first-floor doorways are 8 feet (2.4 m) high, while those on the second floor are 7 feet 4 inches (2.24 m) high; by contrast, Wright's doorways generally average 6 feet (1.8 m) high. The doorways are narrow, requiring some visitors to enter them sideways. The interior uses the same red-and-yellow color scheme as the exterior and is furnished with redwood tiles and masonite wood. Red specks of dust are embedded into the cement floor and then troweled over to give the floor a permanent red tint. A radiant heating system with steam pipes is built into the floor slab. The walls are made of concrete blocks, and there are trenches with convection heaters beneath the windows. There are pieces of built-in furniture and decorations throughout the house, which were all designed by Wright.

The first floor has 780 square feet (72 m^{2}) and is arranged largely in an open plan, with a combined living–dining–kitchen space centered around a fireplace. The entrance foyer is arranged so that occupants could access the second story directly from the entry patio, rather than passing through the living room first. The living room's floor is divided into a grid of tiles measuring 4 by 4 feet (120 by 120 cm). The eastern and northern walls have large glass windows facing a concrete patio, which is also divided into a grid of 4-by-4-foot tiles. The central fireplace has a 4.5-foot-tall (1.4 m) opening with a cantilevered hood, as well as built-in benches facing these windows. The living room's ceilings measure 12 feet (3.7 m) high, and there is a staircase supported by ceiling beams. The lower section of the roof overhangs much of the living room. The kitchen is designed in a similar style to a galley, with devices occupying the entirety of one wall; according to the Chicago Tribune, Wright failed to leave enough space for an oven. During construction, when a tree on the property collapsed during a storm, wood from the tree was reused in the kitchen countertop.

The stairway to the second floor is so narrow that there is no room for a handrail. The second story itself covers 458 square feet (42.5 m^{2}), with bedrooms placed above the kitchen. To accommodate Penfield's height, the bedroom's ceilings measure 8 feet (2.4 m) high. Wright designed the beds, desks, and nightstands in the bedroom, although these pieces of furniture were not built until 2003. At the time, one of the bedrooms has a small desk and a twin bed, while the other two rooms had double beds.

=== Associated buildings ===
Southeast of the main house are a carriage house, dating from 1935 or 1940, and a two-story home, dating from 1867 or 1887. By 2014, these had respectively become a one-bedroom cottage and a five-bedroom duplex residence called the Ward Farmhouse. The estate also includes a second residence known as RiverRock, which was completed in 2025. Like the original house, RiverRock has stone and wood walls, in addition to a living room with full-height glass windows. The new residence also has two bathrooms and three bedrooms. In addition, RiverRock contains furnishings with geometric designs, such as shelves and chairs. Though RiverRock is derived from a design by Wright, the Frank Lloyd Wright Foundation does not consider it to be an authentic Wright work because the design was modified after he died.

== History ==
=== Development ===
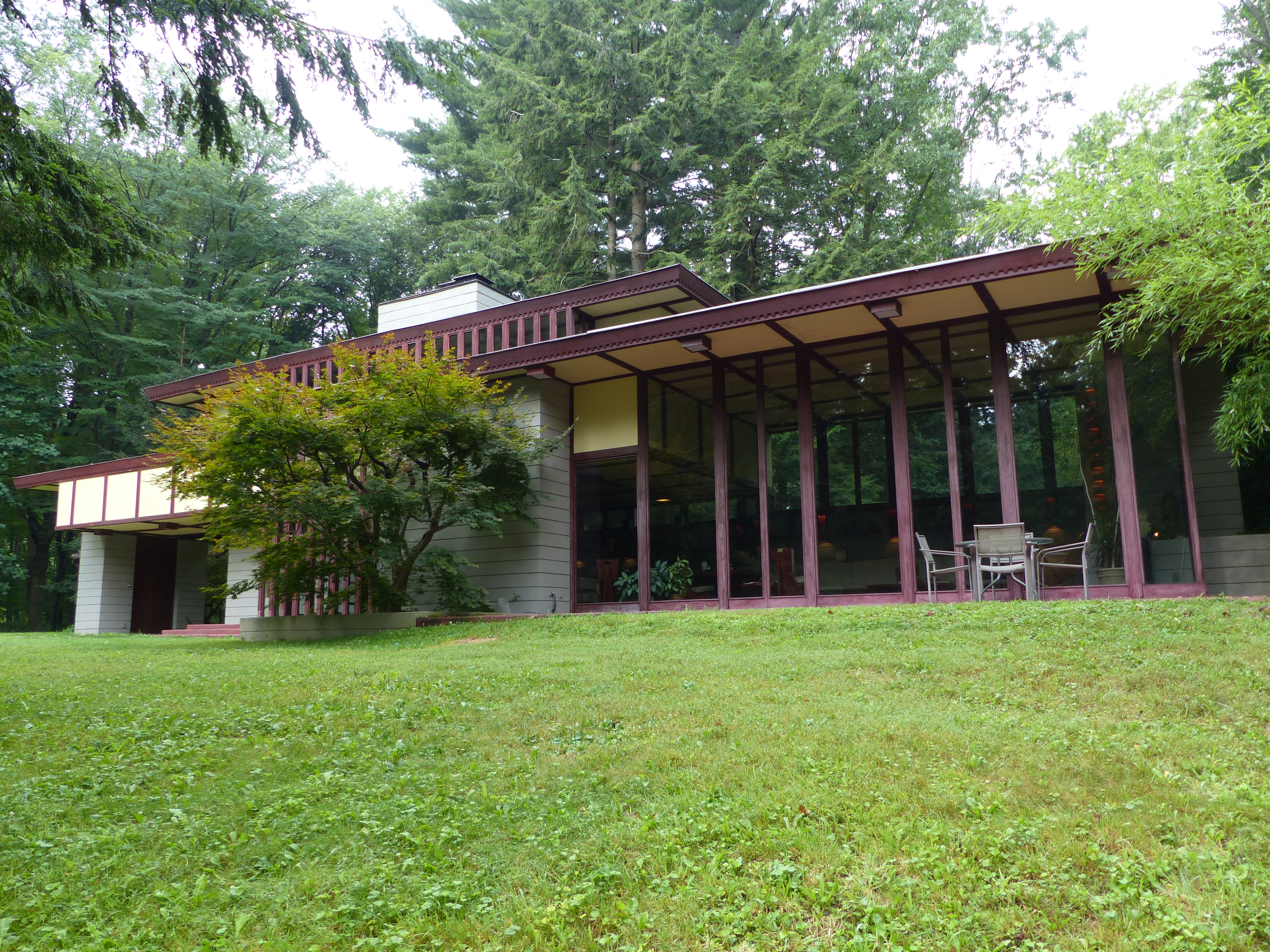
The house's exterior

Louis Penfield, an art teacher and artist, had learned of Frank Lloyd Wright's work while studying at Ohio State University. Penfield and his wife Pauline owned 30 acres (12 ha) of land on the Chagrin River, which had been in Pauline's family for 50 years. The family wanted a house that would overlook the river and fields; though the Penfields had been planning a house there for several years, they had not selected a suitable design. Penfield had been hesitant to contact Wright because he had wanted an inexpensive house, but he was unsure that Wright would agree to design it. Penfield's old friend Eugene Masselink, who worked for Wright, arranged a meeting between the two men. At the time, Penfield had recently visited Phoenix, Arizona, where he had taken a liking to one of Wright's Usonian house designs. In general, the Usonian houses tended to have open plans, geometric floor grids, in-floor heating, and a carport, without a garage or basement.

Upon visiting Wright's Taliesin studio in Wisconsin, Penfield asked if the architect were willing to design a house for a tall man like him. Wright obliged, allegedly quipping that "we'll have to design a machine to tip you sideways first". Penfield later recalled thinking, "If I was going to get stuck with a mortgage, the house better be a good one." The Penfields visited Wright at Taliesin twice to work on the plans. During the first visit, Wright asked Pauline questions about what they wanted to build, and he drew up some preliminary plans. According to Penfield's son Paul, Wright asked Penfield to stand under a ceiling beam at Taliesin while designing the Penfield House. During the Penfields' second visit, they discussed more granular aspects of the topography and design. Wright completed the designs in 1952, (Note: National Park Service 1997, p. 3, gives a conflicting date of 1953 for the house's design.) and construction of the house began in 1953. Local workers were hired to construct the building.

The house was completed in 1955, and Penfield referred to it as "Frank Lloyd Wright Number 1". The house cost either $25,000 or $26,000 to construct (equivalent to $300–312 thousand in 2025). In addition, the family paid Wright a commission which was equivalent to 10 percent of the construction cost. The Plain Dealer wrote that Louis, Pauline, their son Paul, and their daughter Tisa Ann found the house "delightfully livable", even though the interior and landscaping had not been finished. Though Wright had designed furniture for the house, these items were never completed during Louis Penfield's lifetime because of a lack of money. Penfield invited his students to the new house in June 1956.

=== Penfield occupancy ===
One year after the house's completion, Penfield learned that it might have to be destroyed to make way for Interstate 90 in Ohio. After the I-90 plans were announced, Louis Penfield asked Wright to draw up plans for a second house further to the south. The second residence was known as Plan 5909, since it was the ninth design that Wright had created in 1959. It was to have been oriented away from the main house and built out of stone from the Chagrin River, occupying a knoll above the river; hence its informal name, RiverRock. The design was one of Wright's last, and the drawings for RiverRock were mailed to Penfield shortly after Wright's death. Louis never built RiverRock due to a lack of money, but he did bequeath the plans to Paul. Though disagreement arose over whether Wright was actually involved with the plans, an archivist for the Frank Lloyd Wright Foundation later verified that Wright had indeed designed RiverRock. Paul Penfield said he had personally witnessed his father and Wright discuss RiverRock.

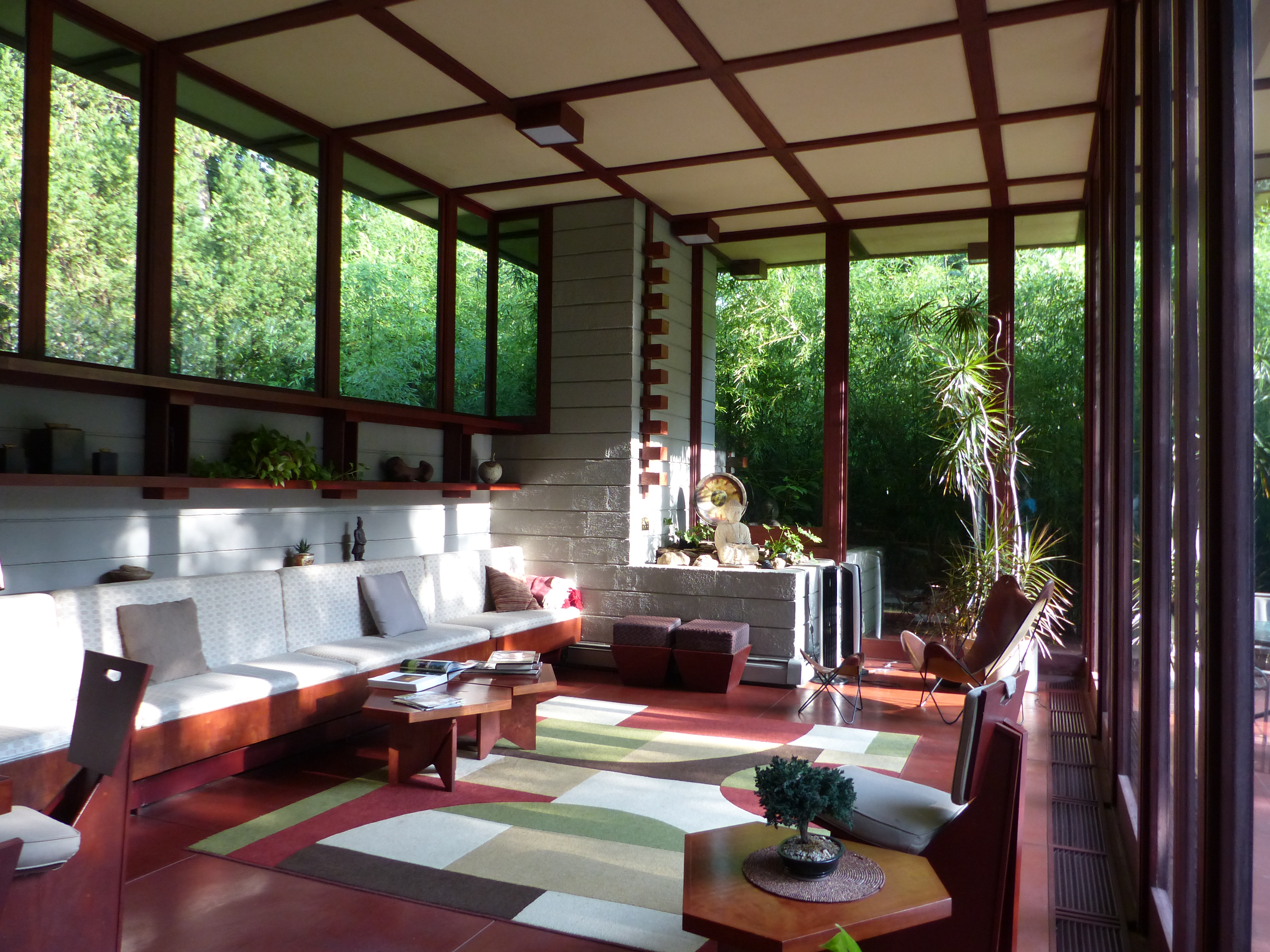
Living room

Although I-90 was relocated about 500 feet (150 m) north, thereby saving the house, the Penfields lost about 7 acres (2.8 ha) of land. The Penfields sued the government of Ohio, claiming $40,000 in damages from the loss of the land and the construction of the highway. The Ohio government had offered the Penfields $14,100 in compensation, but the Penfields claimed that the interstate's existence had ruined the landscape and made the house harder to sell. A jury awarded the Penfields $15,000. Paul recalled that, when he and his family lived there, visitors would come to the house uninvited just to see it.

Louis began building a studio on the estate in 1972, using rock from the Chagrin River. He retired from Mayfield High School in 1974 but continued to work in the arts. After divorcing Pauline in 1980, Louis purchased 5.5 acres (2.2 ha) from her, constructing a stone workshop there. The original house began to decay before Paul took over the house from his father. By 1992, Louis Penfield had given the blueprints for RiverRock to the investors David Jatich and David Smith, who built a scale model of RiverRock and began looking for someone to buy the plans. Penfield wanted to sell off the plans for $1.1 million or $1.2 million. During the 1990s, the family moved out of the Penfield House, renting it out for five years. The house was added to the National Register of Historic Places on February 7, 1997.

=== Homestay usage and sale ===
==== Paul Penfield operation ====
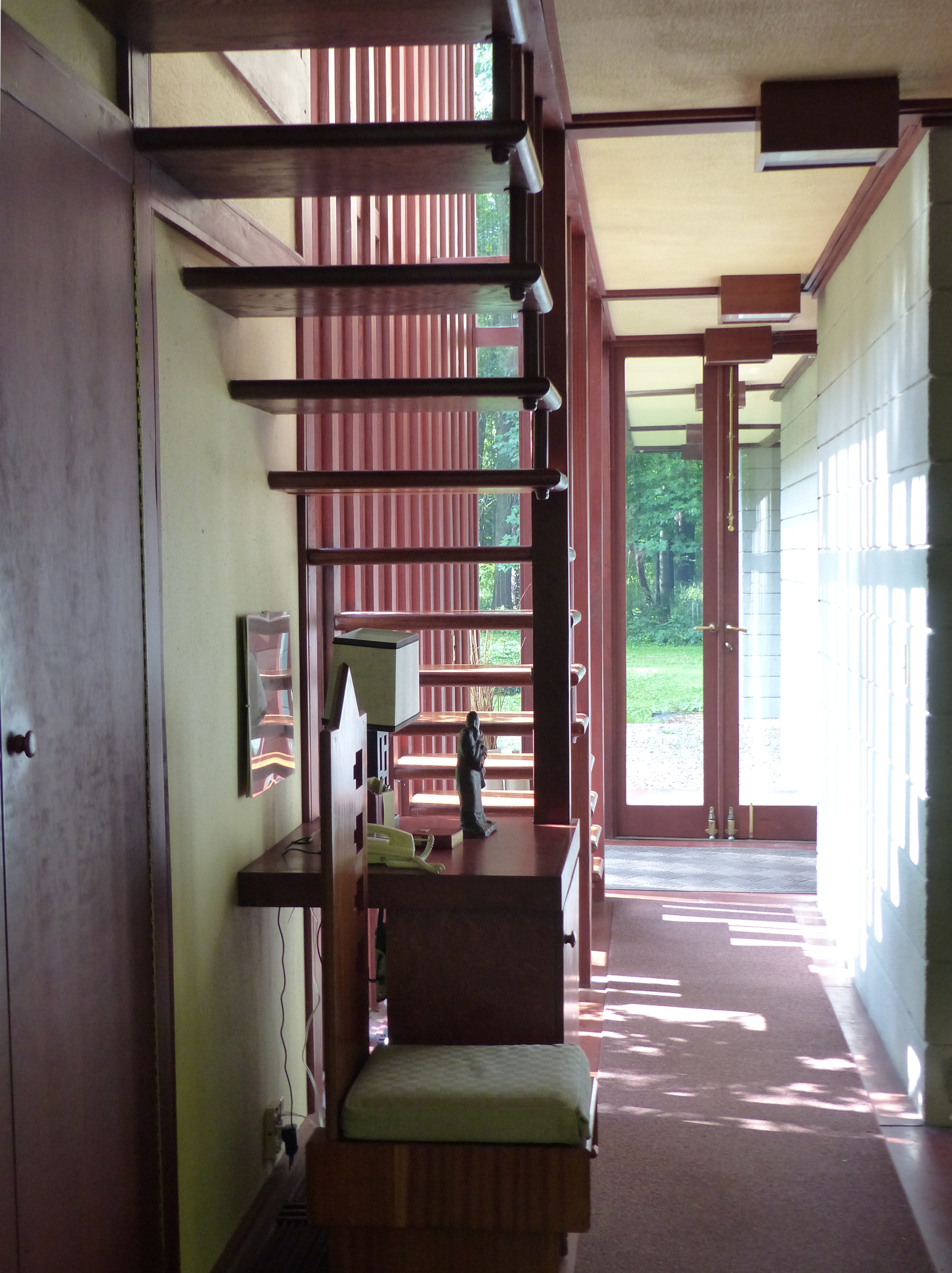
The stairway in the house is supported from the ceiling.

Paul Penfield decided to fit out the interiors in 1998, hiring John Origlio to renovate the building. The project cost $100,000 and entailed fitting out the interior according to Wright's original plans. Since the building was on the National Register of Historic Places, the renovation needed to be performed especially carefully. Paul personally worked on the house's millwork, using wood from nearby trees to manufacture the furniture that Wright had designed for the house. He also replaced the leaky roof and furnished the house with 1950s-era devices such as a typewriter and a rotary phone.

Visitors were allowed to stay at the Louis Penfield House starting in 2003. At the time, along with the Seth Peterson Cottage in Wisconsin and the Price Tower in Oklahoma, the Penfield House was one of three Wright–designed buildings being used as overnight accommodations. Three hundred people had stayed there within a year, and visitors came from as far away as Australia and the Netherlands to stay there. Paul and his wife Donna gave visitors tea, coffee, firewood, and books about Wright, but visitors had to bring their own food. Because the house was being used as a short-term homestay, the Penfields did not give tours. Paul said that owning the house was "like dealing with a group of theater critics"; if he did not maintain the house properly, fans of Wright's work would complain.

In the late 2000s, Buddhist statues and bamboo groves were added to separate the Penfield House from I-90. By 2007, Paul wanted to sell the plans for RiverRock, as the revenue from renting out the original house was not enough to pay for his or his wife's retirement fund. Paul also wished to sell the house and its furnishings by the early 2010s, saying that the house needed repairs and that he wanted to "just rent a canal boat in Holland and travel". In the meantime, some of the rental income was set aside to pay for RiverRock.

==== Sale and later ownership ====
Paul placed the Penfield House, the RiverRock plans, and the other two buildings on the property, for sale in 2014 for $1.7 million. At the time, the main house was occupied nearly 300 nights a year. while other tenants occupied the other two buildings. Paul was 70 years old and could no longer care for the house, and his children were not interested in managing it. The house remained unsold for several years, and in 2017, the three buildings on the site were offered for sale again, with a reduced price of $1.3 million. The RiverRock plans were included in the 2017 sale offer.

Sarah Dykstra bought the Penfield House in 2018, and she and her mother Debbie decided to build the RiverRock home at 2217 River Road. The Dykstra family hired Joseph Myers Architects to design the house, and the family became their own general contractors for RiverRock. Work started in 2022, though local and county departments did not approve the plans until 2023. The house was built using stone from the Chagrin River and nearby stone piles discovered by the Dykstra family. RiverRock was completed in March 2025, and the Dykstras rented out both the Penfield House and RiverRock. A documentary series on RiverRock's construction, The Last Wright, was produced later that year. By 2026, the Penfield House could accommodate five guests at once, and the full size beds had been replaced with two larger queen size beds.

== Reception ==
When the building was completed, The Plain Dealer wrote that it "seems to have grown out of the low hill on which it stands". A writer for the Akron Beacon Journal wrote in 1991 that the Penfield House's design "emits a feeling of spatial freedom that is almost tangible". Art Journal likened the facade to that of the Raymond Carlson House in Phoenix, Arizona.

In 2003, Bob and Joy Schwabach of the Chicago Tribune said that the property "is beautiful, both house and setting, but there are problems". The issues included the extremely narrow doorways, leak-prone flat roofs, and a front door that did not close properly. Becky Linhardt of The Cincinnati Enquirer wrote that, despite the house's tight dimensions, the first floor was a "grand public space" with expansive views of the surrounding landscape. As the Associated Press said: "If Fallingwater is Frank Lloyd Wright's greatest work, then [the Penfield House] is one of his most livable."

In 2012, the travel guidebook Lonely Planet ranked the Penfield House as the "Most Romantic Place in the United States". After the guidebook was published, Paul Penfield reported that the "phone leapt off the hook". After RiverRock opened, Cleveland magazine wrote in 2026 that the Penfield House was "cohesive, cozy and right at home in Willoughby Hills".

== See also ==
- List of Frank Lloyd Wright works
- National Register of Historic Places listings in Lake County, Ohio
