= Weathertex =

Engineered wood product

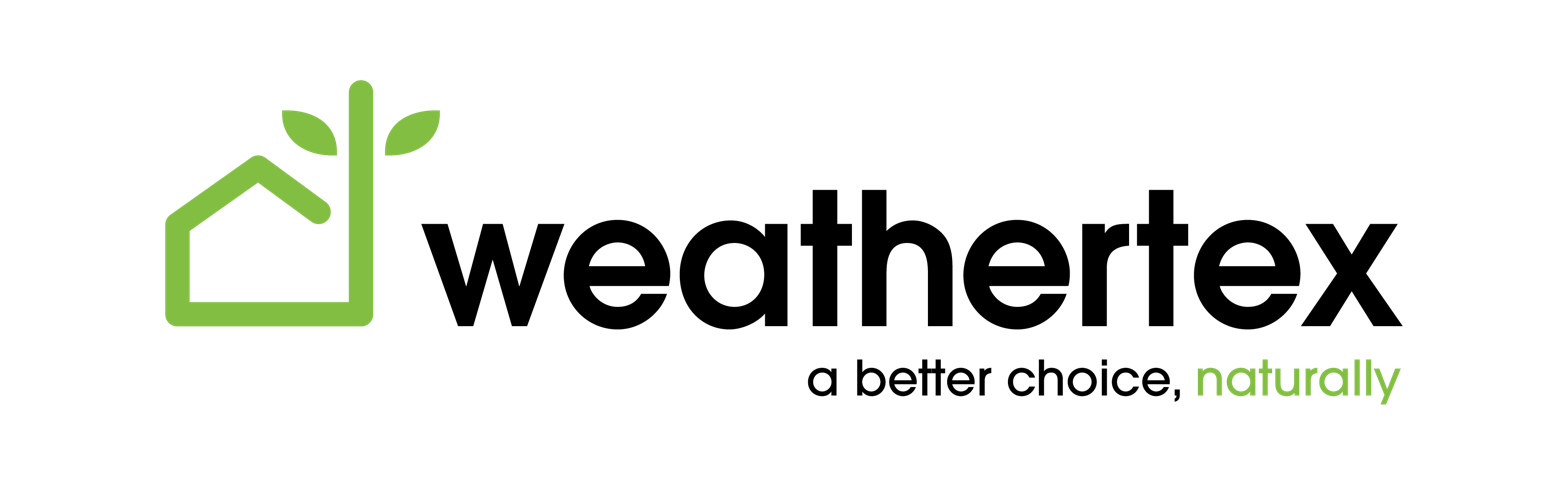
The logo of the company, Weathertex

Weathertex is an Australian-owned family business based in Heatherbrae, New South Wales, Australia.

== History ==
The company manufactures a wood-based panel product known as Weathertex, made primarily from hardwood timber sourced from PEFC-certified and controlled sources. The product composition is described as 97% hardwood timber, largely from eucalyptus species, and 3% natural wax.

The product was first manufactured in Australia in 1939 by Weathertex Pty Ltd. In 1998, the company was purchased by Paul Michael.

By 2000, Weathertex had expanded into export markets. According to the company, it currently employs more than 120 people locally.

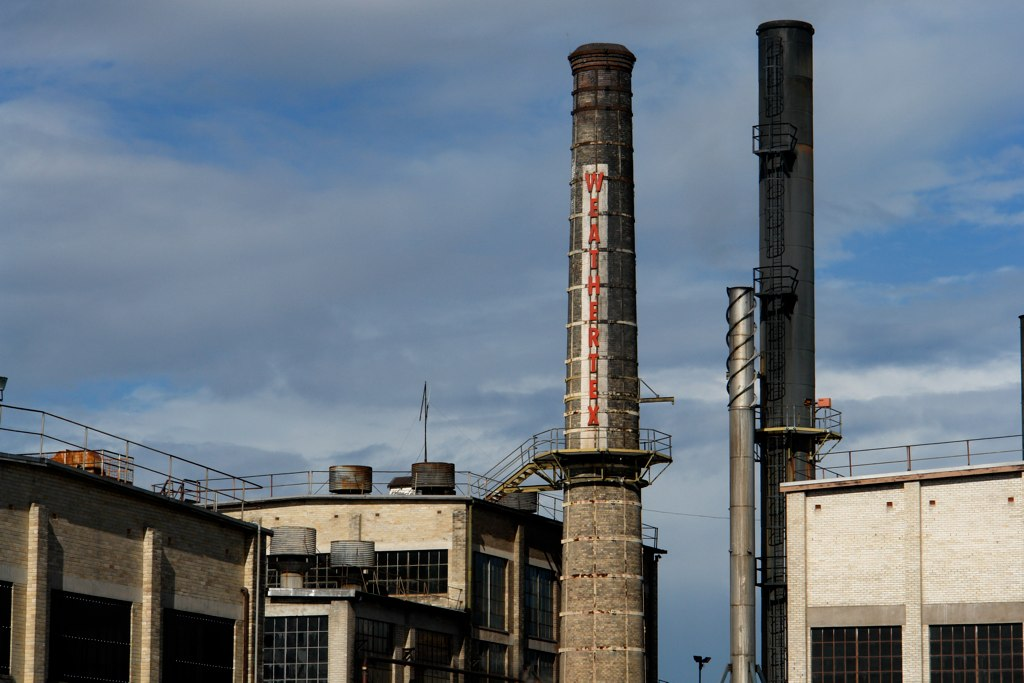
Weathertex factory in Raymond Terrace, New South Wales, Australia

== Product overview ==
The manufacturing process involves converting PEFC-certified hardwood into woodchips using industrial chipping equipment. The chips are processed with steam pressure through Mason guns. During production, wax and water are added to the fibres before the material is formed into sheets and compressed using hydraulic presses.

Weathertex sheets are produced in 9.5 mm thicknesses and are among the larger panel products manufactured in Australia.

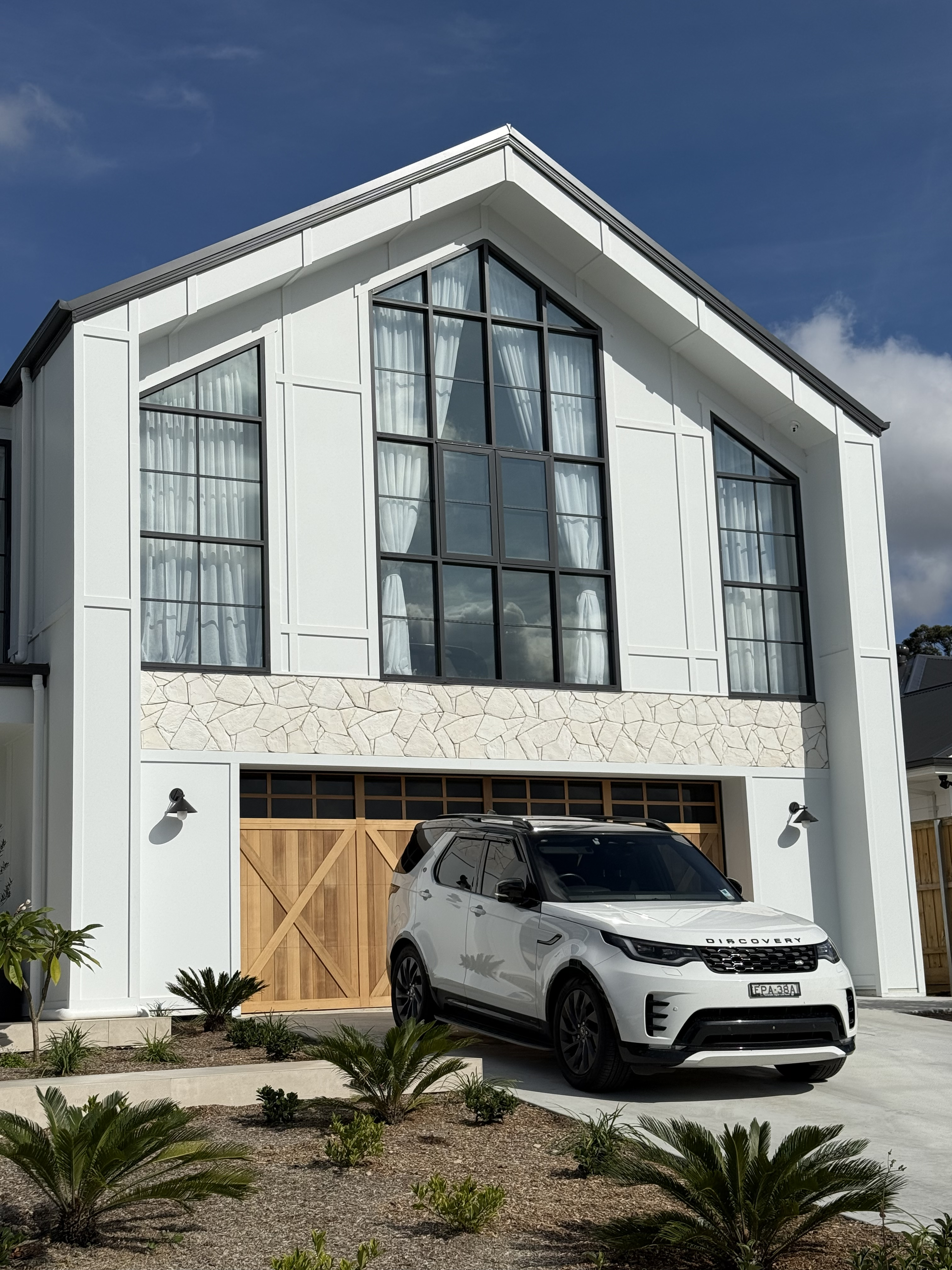
A white-painted house with an exterior clad in Weathertex panels

Reported technical features of the product include:

- No added glues, resins, or formaldehyde-based binders.
- A manufacturer-backed warranty against rotting, splitting, or cracking for up to 25 years.
- Resistance to termites attributed to the removal of sugars and starches during processing.
- Panels designed to be cut using standard woodworking tools.

The product has received environmental certifications including Global GreenTag EPD™. Weathertex products are primarily used in external and internal cladding applications, including weatherboards and architectural panels.

== Sustainability ==
Weathertex publishes sustainability reports outlining its environmental initiatives and alignment with the United Nations Sustainable Development Goals (SDGs). According to the company, these initiatives include efforts related to manufacturing practices, environmental impact reduction, and resource management.

The company states that its sustainability programs are intended to support long-term environmental and community objectives.
