= William Mason =

William, Willie, or Willy Mason may refer to:

== Arts and entertainment ==
- William Mason (poet) (1724–1797), English poet, editor and gardener
- William Mason (architect) (1810–1897), New Zealand architect
- William Mason (composer) (1829–1908), American composer and pianist
- William W. Johnstone (a.k.a. William Mason, 1938–2004), American novelist
- William Mason (director) (fl. 1990s–2010s), director of the Lyric Opera of Chicago
- Willy Mason (born 1984), American singer-songwriter
- William Mason (Downton Abbey), fictional character on the television series Downton Abbey

== Business and industry ==
- William Mason (locomotive builder) (1808–1883), American engineer and builder of locomotives
- William Mason (gunsmith) (1837–1913), American engineer and inventor working for Remington, Colt, and Winchester
- William H. Mason (1877–1940), American inventor; first patented masonite

== Law and politics ==
- William Temple Thomson Mason (1782–1862), Virginia farmer, businessman and politician
- William Mason (New York politician) (1786–1860), United States Representative from New York
- William S. Mason (1832–1899), American politician; mayor of Portland, Oregon
- William E. Mason (American politician) (1850–1921), U.S. Representative and Senator from Illinois
- William Mason, 1st Baron Blackford (1862–1947), British politician and public servant
- William E. Mason (Canadian politician) (1866–1951), Canadian politician; mayor of Regina, Saskatchewan
- William E. Mason (East St. Louis mayor) (fl. 1970s), American politician; mayor of East Saint Louis, Illinois
- William D. Mason (born 1959), American prosecutor from Cuyahoga County, Ohio

== Military ==
- William Mason (1757–1818), American planter and militiaman in the American Revolutionary War
- William Mason (1760–1830), American Revolutionary War soldier, founder of city of Mason, Ohio
- William Pinckney Mason (1843–1922), American lieutenant in the Confederate States Navy

== Others ==
- William Mason (stenographer) (fl. 1672–1709), English writing-master
- William Mason (religious writer) (1719–1791), English Calvinist author and editor of the Gospel Magazine
- William Shaw Mason (1774–1853), Irish statistician and bibliographer
- William Mason (cricketer) (1811–1865), English cricketer
- Willie Mason (born 1980), Australian rugby league footballer
- Bill Mason (William Clifford Mason, 1929–1988), Canadian naturalist and canoeist
- Bill Mason (footballer) (William Sidney Mason, 1908–1995), English football goalkeeper
- Billy Mason (footballer) (William Bernard Mason, 1855–?), English footballer
- Bill Mason (rowing coach) (William Graham Mason, born 1950), British Olympic rower and coach

== Other uses ==
- William Mason (locomotive), steam locomotive built for the Baltimore and Ohio Railroad
- William H. Mason

== See also ==
- Bill Mason (disambiguation)
