= Bill Mason (disambiguation) =

Bill Mason (1929–1988) was a Canadian naturalist and canoeist

Bill Mason may also refer to:

- Bill Mason (footballer) (1908–1995), English football goalkeeper
- Bill Mason (director) (1915–2002), British documentary film maker and amateur race driver
- Bill Mason (jewel thief) (born 1940), American jewel thief
- Bill Mason (rowing coach) (born 1950), former British Olympic rower and coach

== See also ==
- William Mason (disambiguation)
