= Seth Peterson Cottage =

Historic house in Reedsburg, Wisconsin

- U.S. National Register of Historic Places
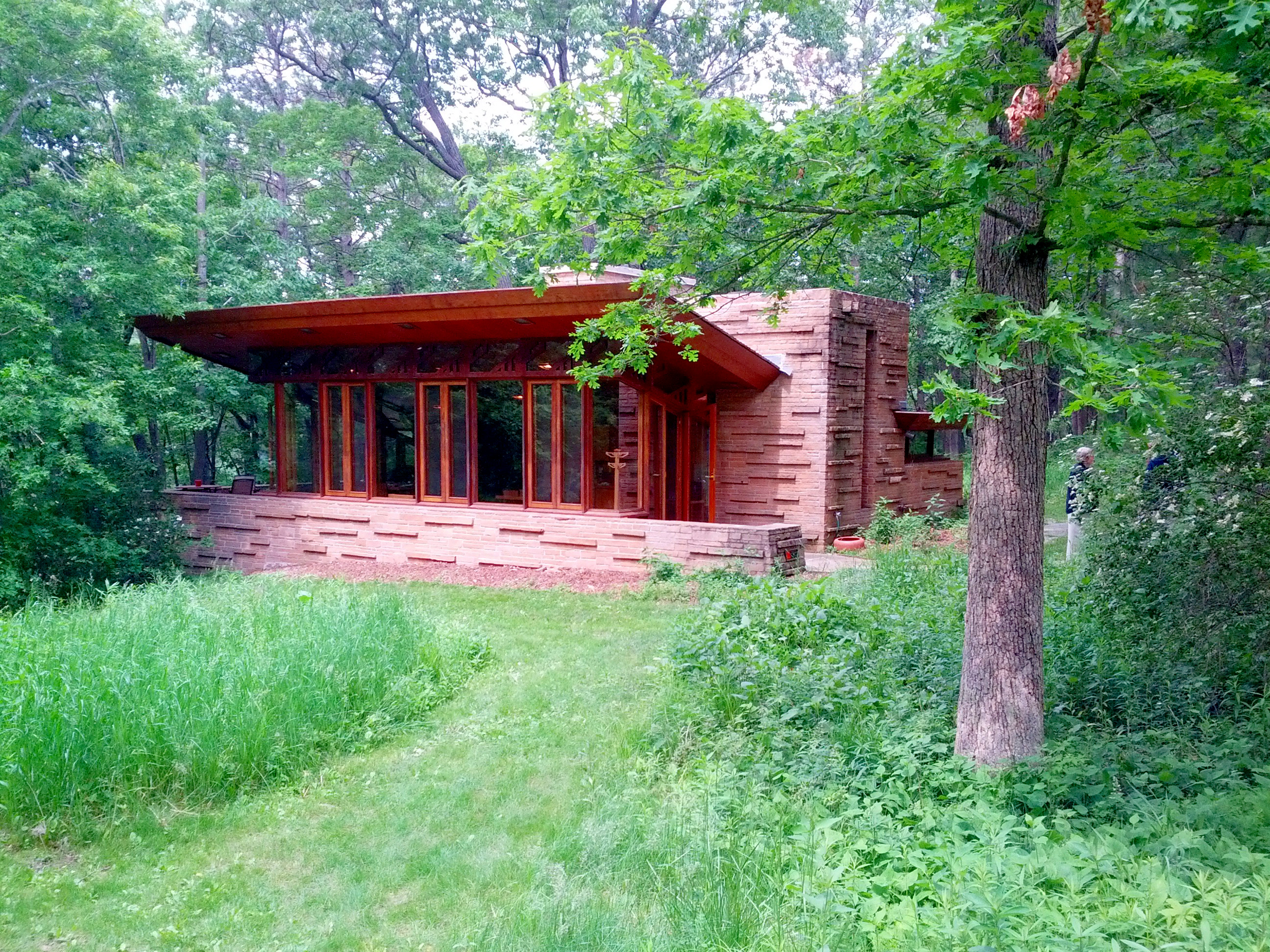
- Exterior of the cottage, 2013

- Location within Wisconsin Location within the United States
- Interactive map of Seth Peterson Cottage
- Location: E9982 Fern Dell Road, Reedsburg, Wisconsin, U.S.
- Nearest city: Lake Delton, Wisconsin
- Coordinates: 43°33′47″N 89°49′30″W
- Built: 1958
- Architect: Frank Lloyd Wright and Thomas Casey
- Architectural style: Usonian
- NRHP reference No.: 81000059
- Added to NRHP: November 9, 1981

The Seth Peterson Cottage is a one-story cottage in Mirror Lake State Park near Reedsburg in the U.S. state of Wisconsin. Designed by Frank Lloyd Wright with Thomas Casey as the supervising architect, the house was built for computer operator Seth Peterson of Black Earth, Wisconsin, and was one of Wright's last designs. The exterior of the building has ashlar foundations and large glass windows. The cottage has a bedroom and a living–dining room, which encircles a utility core composed of a kitchen and bathroom. The roof above the bedroom is flat, while the rest of the cottage has a sloped roof. The house is on the National Register of Historic Places.

Work on the cottage began in 1959, but Peterson died by suicide before it was completed. The house was acquired in 1961 by the Pritchard family, who completed construction. In 1966, the Wisconsin Department of Natural Resources (DNR) bought the cottage as part of an expansion of Mirror Lake State Park. The house fell into disrepair until Audrey Laatsch, a local resident, formed the Seth Peterson Cottage Conservancy in 1989 to renovate the building. Following a $300,000 repair project, the house was opened to the public for rentals in 1992.

== Description ==
The Seth Peterson Cottage is located at E9982 Fern Dell Road in Reedsburg, Wisconsin, near Wisconsin Dells. Designed by Frank Lloyd Wright in the Usonian style, the Peterson Cottage is a one-story building with one bedroom. It sits on a hill about 60 feet (18 m) above Mirror Lake, within Mirror Lake State Park in Sauk County. The only access is by a long driveway.

The Peterson Cottage is one of 41 extant Wright designs in Wisconsin and was one of the last buildings that Wright designed before his death in 1959. It is also the final building designed by him with a rectangular floor plan; his few subsequent designs have circular or triangular floor plans. Taliesin Associated Architects, the successor firm to Wright's practice, later copied the general design of the Peterson Cottage in the construction of the Don and Virginia Lovness House. Like Wright's other Usonian houses, the cottage lacks either a basement or an attic and is laid out in a series of interconnected, free-flowing spaces. Unlike these other houses, however, it also does not include a carport.

As of 2024, the cottage's bedroom can accommodate up to two people overnight, while the living–dining room has a sofa bed for an additional two guests. Furthermore, the space can host up to 40 guests for events. Throughout the year, tours of the cottage are hosted on the second Sunday of every month for a fee, with free tours available during Wisconsin State Park Open Houses.

=== Exterior ===
The exterior of the building has ashlar foundations and is set into the western slope of the hill. The horizontally laid sandstone used in the house and is sourced from a local quarry. The facade is made of masonry and glass, like many of Wright's other buildings, though about one-third of it was originally made of plate glass particularly along the southern, western, and eastern elevations. The northern elevation is made of stone. A strip of windows also spans across the southwest corner. The windows are adorned with wooden cutouts that cast shadows across the interior throughout the day.

The bedroom was originally covered by a flat roof, while the other spaces were covered by a roof that slopes outward. Like many of Wright's other buildings, the roof has protruding eaves, and there is a central chimney. During the house's renovation in the early 1990s, the slope of the roof was modified to prevent water accumulation, and the original 2-inch-thick (5.1 cm) insulation was increased to 8 inches (200 mm).

=== Interior ===
The cottage measures roughly 30 by 36 feet (9.1 by 11.0 m) across. Sources disagree on whether it has 880 square feet (82 m^{2}) or 900 square feet (84 m^{2}) of interior space. The Peterson Cottage was the smallest house that Wright designed in Wisconsin and one of his smallest overall, surpassed only by the cottages he designed for the Stevens family in Yemassee, South Carolina. Wright's son-in-law William Wesley Peters said the building had "more architecture per square foot" than any of his other designs. According to architect John Eifler, who had helped restore several of Wright's buildings, the Peterson Cottage is the only existing example of a Wright-designed cottage centered around a fireplace. The living–dining room and bedroom surround the house's masonry utility core, arranged roughly in a "G" shape. Due to the small dimensions of the house, the rooms are not wheelchair-accessible.

The floors and exterior patio are both made of flagstone, and there is a radiant heating system beneath the floor slab. Pennies from 1959 are embedded in the floor. The front door leads directly into the main living space, which has a high ceiling—contrasting with Wright's other houses, which typically had high spaces accessed by foyers with low ceilings. The living–dining room has a dining area with chairs and tables, as well as a living area with additional furniture. Two glass double doors open from the dining room, overlooking Mirror Lake. The living room's ceiling reaches a height of 12 feet (3.7 m) on one wall.

A short corridor with closets connects the living room to the bedroom, which covers 8 by 12 feet (2.4 by 3.7 m). The bedroom has a lower ceiling than the living room and is furnished with a queen bed and a folding door. At the core of the cottage is a kitchen and bathroom which bisect the southern half of the interior. The kitchen has a small sink, refrigerator, cooking range, and oven but no countertop. A ladder provides access to a loft above. The kitchen's ceiling has a skylight, with the living room ceiling sloping down to meet the kitchen ceiling. The bathroom next to the kitchen has a toilet, sink, and shower. The doors to the bedroom and bathroom are the only interior doors in the house.

== History ==
=== Development and use as residence ===
The house was built for Seth Peterson, a computer operator from Black Earth, Wisconsin, who was an admirer of Frank Lloyd Wright and had unsuccessfully tried to become an apprentice at Wright's Taliesin Fellowship. Peterson frequently traveled to Wright's Taliesin studio, located about 40 miles (64 km) south of the future site of Peterson Cottage,) as well as houses Wright designed in Chicago. In August 1958, Peterson bought a cottage on Mirror Lake near Lake Delton, Wisconsin, but it burned down the following month. At some point afterward, Peterson decided to hire Wright to reconstruct the house, though sources do not indicate when this occurred. After initially receiving no response from the architect, Peterson sent Wright a $1,000 (Note: The documentarian Bill Kult says that Peterson sent Wright $500. Claire Barnett, who led the Seth Peterson Cottage Conservancy, gives a figure of $700.) check as part of a retainer agreement. Wright, who was low on funds, shortly cashed the check, thus committing to the house's design. Initially, Wright anticipated that the house would cost $15,000 to build.

Neither Wright or Peterson lived to see the completion of the building. Construction commenced in early 1959, shortly before Wright's death; he had signed the drawings in October 1958, six months before he died. Peterson and his family borrowed $12,000 that July to finance the building's construction. Mackey Adams of the Adams Brothers Construction Company served as the house's general contractor, and Peterson himself constructed parts of the house to save money. Thomas Casey was the supervising architect; Wright himself reportedly never visited the site during construction. Construction stopped after Peterson ran out of money, and he hanged himself in 1960 at the age of 23. At the time, Peterson was despondent; he was in debt, and his bride had reportedly left him. After Peterson's suicide, the house was taken over by receivers. According to the Wisconsin State Journal, one account suggested that the house's plumber quit, taking his materials with him, upon hearing of Peterson's death.

Lilian T. Pritchard, (Note: Also cited as "Mrs. Owen L. Pritchard") a socialite from Milwaukee, bought the house in late 1961. The next year, she hired Taliesin Associated Architects to renovate it. The Pritchard family completed the project and invited guests to the house in September 1962. The final cost of the cottage has been variously cited as $24,000, $26,000, $35,000, or $38,000. Due to a lack of records, the true cost of the house is unknown. Lilian's son Owen was the home's first actual occupant. Owen raised several Afghan Hounds while living at the house and added a high fence to keep the dogs from running away. A forced-air heating system was also installed in the house during this period. The Pritchards hired Tom Casey to draw up plans for an expansion of the cottage, which were never carried out. After Owen died, Lilian considered either expanding the house or selling it.

=== DNR acquisition and deterioration ===
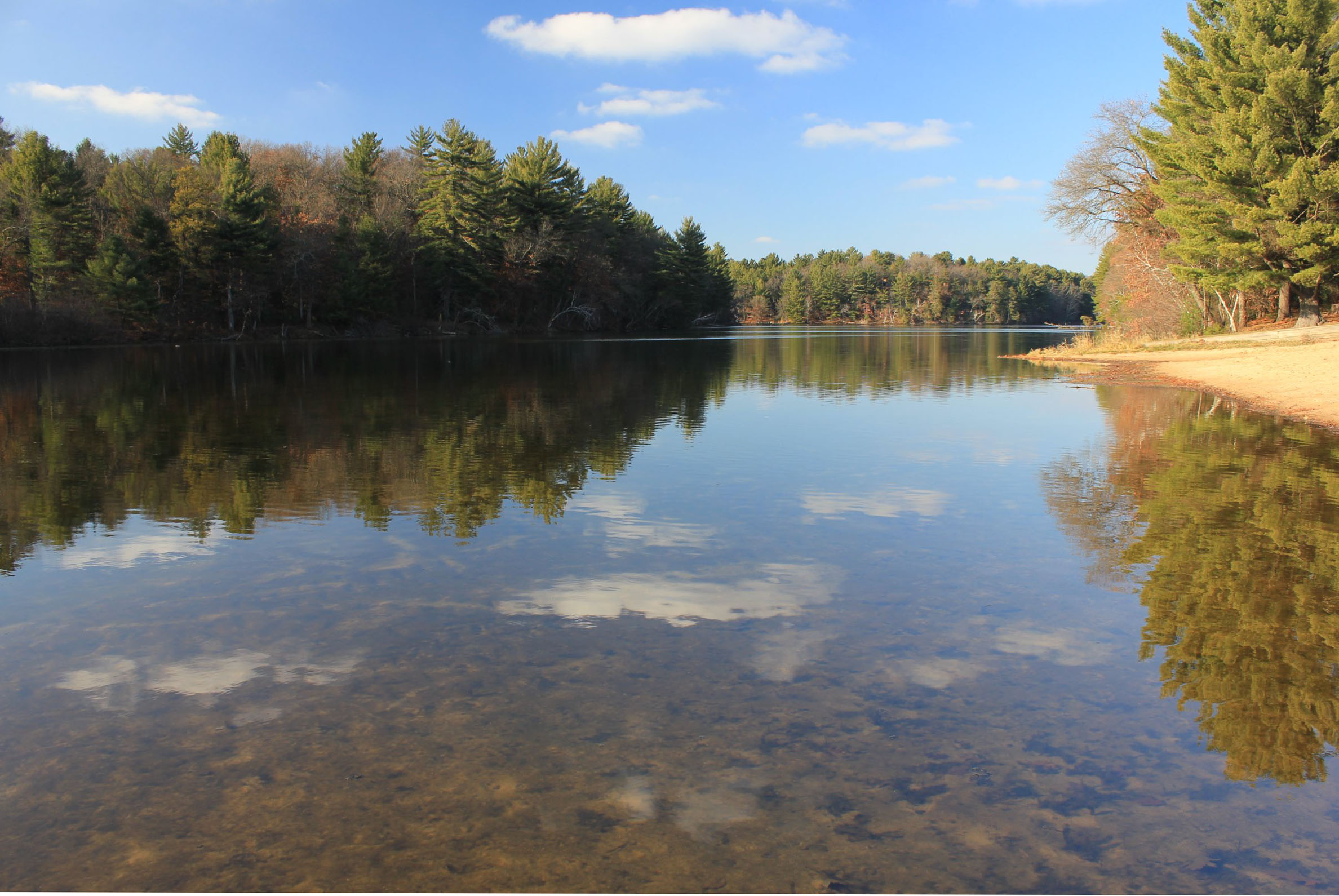
The Peterson Cottage became part of Mirror Lake State Park (pictured) in 1966.

In September 1966, the Wisconsin Department of Natural Resources (DNR) acquired the cottage for $38,400, incorporating it into the adjacent Mirror Lake State Park. Sources disagree on why the DNR bought the land. A Baraboo News Republic article from 1982 stated that the DNR wanted to convert the house into a visitor shelter, while another article from the same newspaper, published in 1990, asserted that the DNR wanted to demolish the cottage and restore the landscape to its natural condition. At the time of the DNR's purchase, the house was not considered historically significant. However, local residents and preservationists spoke out against the cottage's demolition. The DNR preserved the house after learning that Wright had designed it, and the building was used as a cross-country skiing lodge. The cottage was ultimately abandoned, as it was too far removed from the rest of the park, and the DNR's staff could not adequately oversee it. In particular, the Peterson Cottage was separated from the rest of the park by six plots of private land, which the DNR was unable to acquire, and it was about 1/4 mile (0.40 km) away from Fern Dell Road.

The Peterson Cottage started to deteriorate due to vandalism and a lack of upkeep. An Associated Press article directly attributed the vandalism to the building's use as a skiing lodge. As a preventative measure, the DNR boarded up the cottage's windows and installed a fence to discourage trespassing. Despite these efforts, people broke in anyway, hosting parties and setting fires. Some fans of Wright's work sold pieces of the building's decorations. Moreover, rodents chewed through the wooden boards covering the windows, and melting snow created a hole in the roof. The house was also a target of two attempted arson attacks. By the 1980s, vandals had broken a glass pane supporting the structure, prompting the DNR to install temporary supports to prevent the roof from collapsing. The DNR reported that while the house's masonry frame had not deteriorated much, there were severe leaks. The house was added to the National Register of Historic Places (NRHP) in 1981, and the same year it was added to Wisconsin's Register of Historic Places. It was Wright's 15th design in Wisconsin to be listed on the NRHP and one of about 617 NRHP listings in the state. The Peterson Cottage was also the only Wright-designed building that the Wisconsin government owned.

The cottage remained abandoned throughout the 1980s because it could not be used for recreational use, and there was not enough space in the house for an office or a superintendent's residence. Jerald Trumm, Mirror Lake State Park's superintendent at the time, proposed converting the cottage into a shelter or a nature center. However, he did not have the money to accomplish either—restoring the house would have cost $23,000, one-quarter of the park's annual budget. The DNR was also unable to lease or sell the building to a private citizen, and relocating it was deemed infeasible. According to Trumm, even if the house were to be restored, protecting its large glass windows against vandals would prove to be difficult. Additionally, the house's annual heating costs alone would be over $5,000. The department had hoped to identify a group to take over the cabin but had not received any clear commitments.

=== Restoration efforts ===
==== Planning ====
In the late 1980s, psychotherapist Audrey Laatsch, a local resident, became interested in the cottage after noticing its rundown condition. According to one account, she first noticed the house after her canoe flipped over and she sought a place to dry off. Laatsch subsequently led a campaign to restore the cottage, despite having neither money nor jurisdiction. Although she had no prior experience with historic preservation, Laatsch said that she had long been interested in interior design and Wright's work. A subcommittee of the Mirror Lake Association led early efforts to preserve the house. The Seth Peterson Cottage Conservancy (SPCC), a nonprofit organization led by Laatsch, was founded in October 1988 to continue the association's work. The next year, the DNR and the Mirror Lake Association held a public hearing on the future usage of the Peterson Cottage. Approximately 60 people attended, including John Eifler.

Trumm estimated that restoring the cottage and improving access to it would cost $120,000–150,000. The Wisconsin government agreed to provide two $25,000 matching funds grants in mid-1989, on the condition that the SPCC raise an equivalent amount of money. That November, the DNR leased the cottage to the SPCC for a period of 15 years, and the SPCC announced plans to operate the house as an overnight accommodation and event space. Although the DNR could not lease out the property, the SPCC was not subject to this restriction, and the state passed legislation specifically to allow overnight accommodations in Mirror Lake State Park. With rental rates tentatively set at $175 a night, the SPCC projected it could bring in at least $15,000 per year in profit. Volunteers began cleaning the house in late 1989, and Eifler was hired to design the cottage's restoration. The SPCC also sought tax exemptions for the renovation. Because the building was listed on the NRHP, the SPCC was required to obtain state government approval for various aspects of the renovation.

==== Reconstruction ====
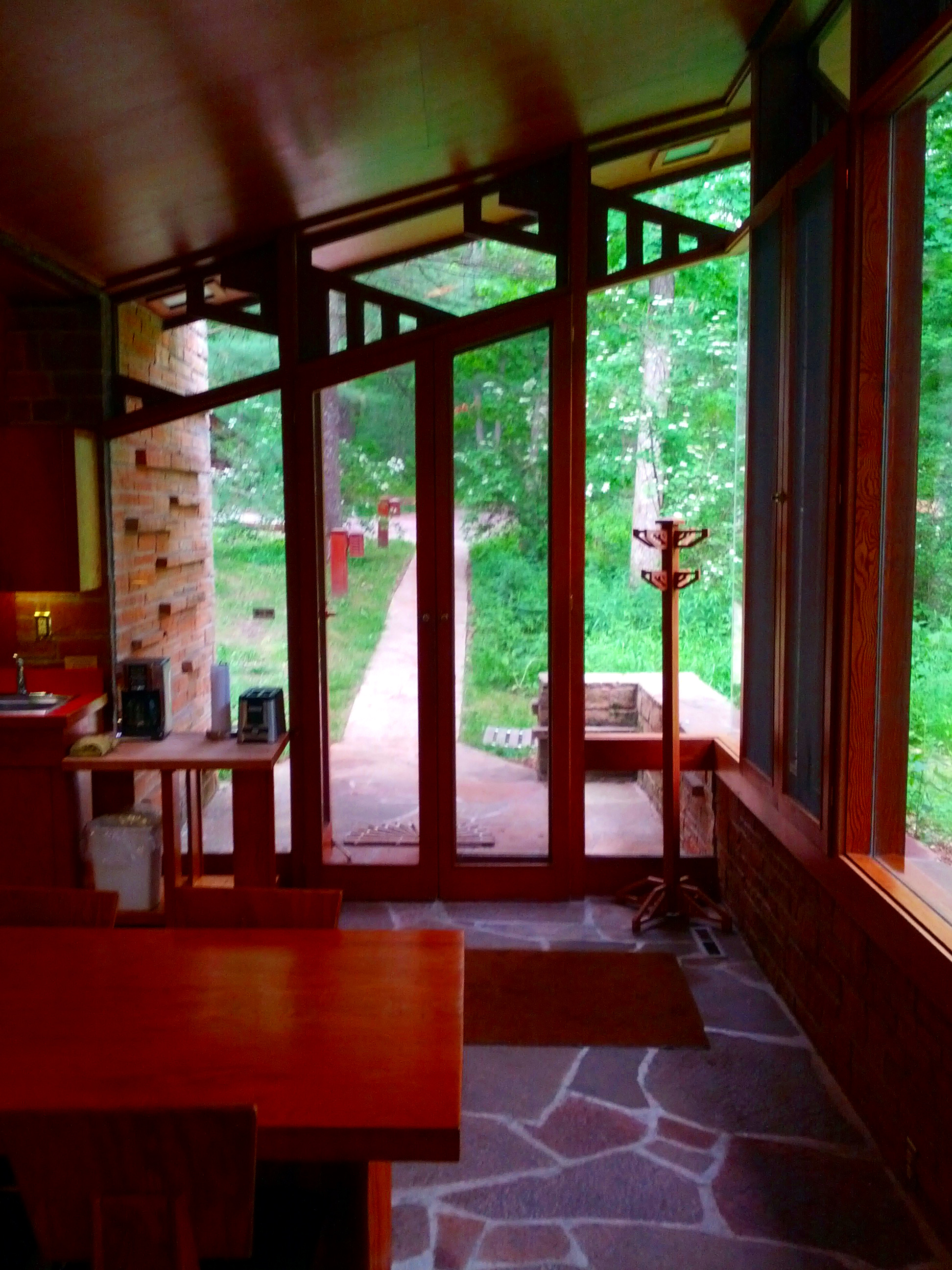
Interior of the Peterson Cottage

Conservancy members first met to discuss the cottage's restoration in early 1990 and began raising $100,000 for urgent repairs. In the long run, the organization anticipated that the project would cost at least $213,000. It also invited the general public to help restore the house, hosting its first "Hands-on Work Holiday" at the end of March. One of Peterson's childhood friends, Burt Goderstad, donated the original architectural drawings for the house to the SPCC. Although the cottage had been completed just three decades prior, everything except the walls and floors had to be rebuilt due to its poor condition. In addition to restoring the house's original appearance, the project involved installing a radiant heating system, which had been part of the original design but never installed. Parts of the design were modified to make the house wheelchair accessible, and energy-efficient windows and insulated shades were also installed.

In April 1990, the Wisconsin Conservation Corps conducted preliminary work—which included constructing a trail, removing the original roof, and temporarily disassembling the floor—at a cost of $16,000. The preliminary work was completed by June. Later that year, the Andy Warhol Foundation for the Visual Arts gave the SPCC a $10,000 grant, which allowed the organization to rebuild the roof. To raise additional money, the SPCC held monthly tours of the cottage, and sold prints depicting the house. Various firms donated material and labor. For example, the house received windows from Pella and a refrigerator from Sub-Zero, both of which had been among the house's original suppliers. Companies such as Wisconsin Power & Light and American Family Insurance donated money as well. Although the project was supposed to have been completed by October 1990, this was delayed due to lackluster fundraising.

The Wisconsin government disbursed the matching grant in June 1991 after $50,000 had been raised, and the National Park Service provided an additional $4,135 that same month. By then, the SPCC's cost estimate for the restoration had increased to $325,000. (Note: This included $250,000 to restore the building itself, $50,000 for landscaping, and $25,000 for equipment and interior furnishings.) The new roof was also completed at that point; unlike the original, it was sloped slightly and had a thicker waterproof membrane. In early 1992, the Jeffris Family Foundation of Janesville, Wisconsin, agreed to provide an $80,000 matching grant, which the conservancy received in June after independently raising an equivalent amount. This funding was used to build custom furniture that Wright had designed but never constructed. Volunteers also worked on the house's mechanical systems during this period. The renovation ultimately cost more than $300,000, with some sources giving a figure of up to $350,000. (Note: The Racine Journal Times says that, while the SPCC spent $250,000 upfront, it received another $100,000 worth of donated material.)

=== Usage as rental house ===
The house was rededicated on June 7, 1992—a date chosen because it coincided with a free-admission day at Wisconsin state parks and fell one day before both Wright's and Peterson's birthdays. The SPCC began renting the house for homestays the following month, hiring the Sand County Service Company to manage bookings. Laatsch said that "the bed arrived just 20 minutes ahead of the first guests". The Peterson Cottage thus became the first Wright–designed house that visitors could rent for overnight stays. Although the SPCC never formally advertised the cottage to visitors, the state government did, along with several other Wright buildings in Wisconsin, as part of the Frank Lloyd Wright Wisconsin Heritage Tour. The cottage was used for events such as birthday parties, anniversaries, and weddings, attracting visitors from as far away as Australia. In addition, open house events were hosted on the second Sunday of each month.

The SPCC held its annual meetings at the Peterson Cottage, and also sought volunteers to help landscape the surrounding area. By the mid-1990s, there was a months-long waiting list to rent the cottage, which was occupied 325 days a year. In 1995, the Reedsburg Times-Press reported that people booked the house for events up to four years in advance. The high occupancy rate allowed the SPCC to pay off the building's construction costs in full. The SPCC had completed all major construction work by 1996, at which point it shifted its focus to maintenance, as some of the house's furnishings needed to be replaced due to high usage. The SPCC was considering constructing a dock and gate for visitors by the late 1990s, and it also wanted to donate $25,000 to the DNR for the construction of a visitor center. Thereafter, the SPCC began giving a portion of its profits to the DNR.

The Peterson Cottage continued to have a two-year-long waiting list in the early 21st century. The SPCC retained control of the house, renewing its lease with the DNR. In 2003, the SPCC sued the Goodyear Tire and Rubber Company, which had supplied the radiant heating system, claiming that the rubber tubing in the floors had decayed prematurely. Along with the Bernard Schwartz House and Louis Penfield House, it was one of a small number of Wright–designed private residences that were being used as homestays. (Note: The Price Tower in Oklahoma had a hotel, and the Edwin H. Cheney House was used as a bed and breakfast; neither were strictly used as homestays.) By the 20th anniversary of its opening in 2012, the house was booked more than 90 percent of the time. A SPCC official said in 2022 that renting out the house had "been a very successful project for us financially". By 2024, the house had accommodated 10,000 overnight visitors.

== Impact ==
=== Reception ===
Architecturally, Wisconsin Dells Events wrote that "the architect's unique style is evident in the one-bedroom structure", particularly in the way the house's layout is designed around a central fireplace. Commentators likened the house's interior to a cave and wrote that the windows helped relate the interiors to the natural surroundings. Another critic from the Courier News described the house's design as being "in perfect harmony with sandstone cliffs" nearby. Due to the bedroom's small ceiling, the Reedsburg Times-Press likened the house to a mushroom. Another reviewer, writing for Vogue magazine in 2022, said that "there's no other place to hang out—at least if you're seeking comfort—than the sprawling living room", saying that the bedroom was small, as was the case with many Wright designs.

After the house opened to the public, the Chicago Tribune described the cottage as "one of the newest small wonders of the world", while Paul Goldberger wrote that "the house possesses an extraordinary quality that can only be called monumentality in miniature." According to the Baraboo News Republic, visitors felt that the building was "a jewel in the wilderness" and that it "excites visually yet calms emotionally". A critic for the Chicago Tribune said that the house was "an unforgettable experience" during the day but that it was cold and uncomfortable during winter nights. Travel & Leisure magazine called the Peterson Cottage "one of the least known—and the most petite among all of [Wright's] structures".

There has also been commentary on the building's symbolism. A reporter for The Wall Street Journal said that the cottage was "a work of art" because of its secluded location, while the Financial Times wrote that the cottage was "modernism in miniature" in 2010. An article in Corporate Report Wisconsin described the Peterson Cottage as one of several Wright designs that "have, over the years, become a part of Wisconsin's cultural and historical fabric". In 2015, a writer for The Columbus Dispatch compared the cottage to a cathedral.

=== Media and accolades ===
The Lovness family replicated the cottage's design when they constructed a residence in Stillwater, Minnesota, in 1976, and the design also inspired the O'Donnell family's house in Bellevue, Iowa. After the building's 1990s renovation, longtime Wright biographer Brendan Gill described the cottage in an article for Architectural Digest. The house and its renovation were detailed in a 1997 book by John Eifler and Kristin Visser. It was also the subject of the 2016 documentary The Jewel in the Woods, produced by Bill Kult, who spent 16 years documenting the house's history. In addition, after Laatsch died in 2002, her friend Jeff Hagen painted a portrait of the Peterson Cottage titled Audrey's Star.

The cottage's renovation received an award from the Wisconsin Association of Historic Preservation Commissions, in addition to the Wisconsin Trust Award for Historic Preservation. Eifler & Associates also received an award from the American Institute of Architects' Chicago chapter, and Laatsch received a Wright Spirit Award from the Frank Lloyd Wright Building Conservancy in 1993. The SPCC also received a certificate of commendation from the Wisconsin State Historical Society in 1995. The SPCC gives out the Kristin Visser Historical Preservation Award every two years to people who have contributed to the preservation of a Wright-designed building or Prairie School building in Wisconsin or neighboring states.

== See also ==
- List of Frank Lloyd Wright works
- National Register of Historic Places listings in Sauk County, Wisconsin
