= Mirror Lake State Park =

State Park in Sauk County, Wisconsin, US

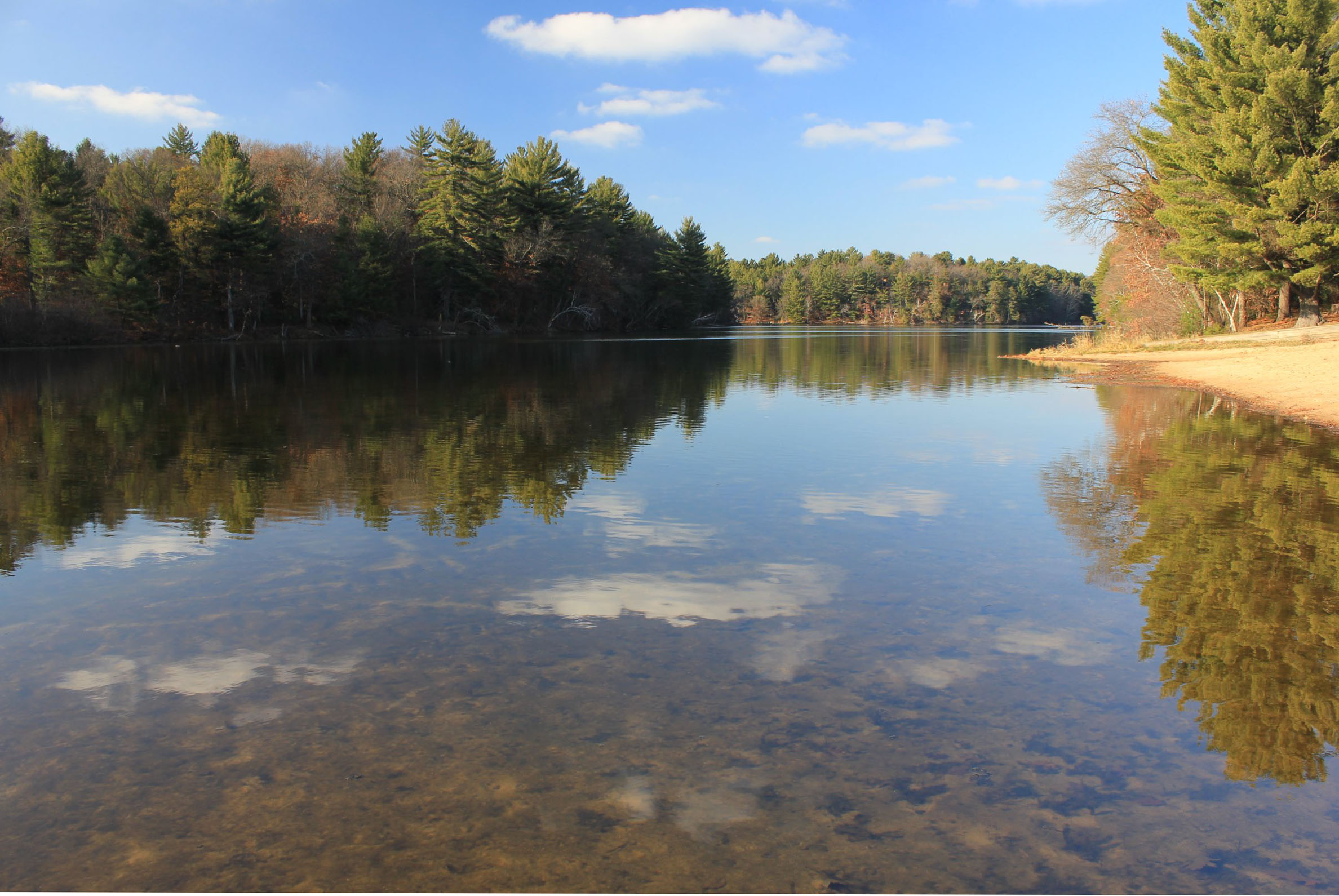
- Interactive map of Mirror Lake State Park
- Location: Sauk County, Wisconsin, United States
- Coordinates: 43°33′54″N 89°49′12″W
- Area: 2,179 acres (882 ha)
- Elevation: 846 ft (258 m)
- Established: 1962
- Administrator: Wisconsin Department of Natural Resources
- Website: Official website
Mirror Lake
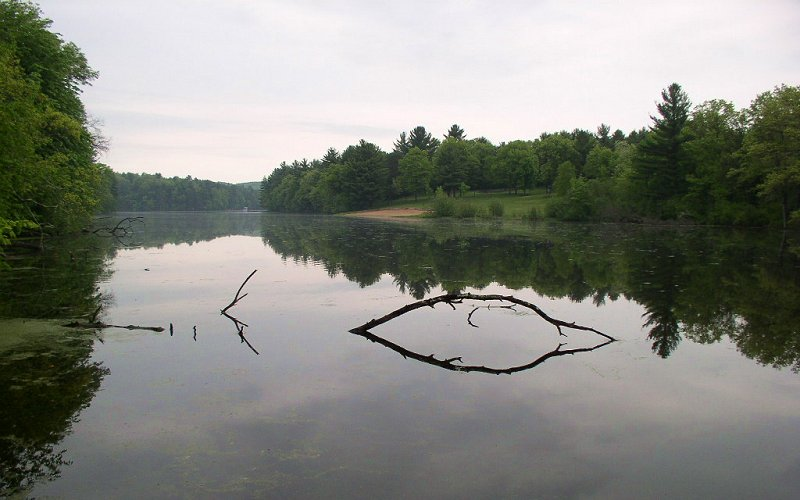

- Location within Wisconsin
- Location: Wisconsin Dells region
- Coordinates: 43.5639576°N 89.8331238°W
- Type: Reservoir
- Primary inflows: Dell Creek
- Primary outflows: Dell Creek
- Basin countries: United States
- Surface area: 139 acres (56 ha)
- Average depth: 14 ft (4.3 m)
- Max. depth: 19 ft (5.8 m)
- Surface elevation: 846 ft (258 m)

Mirror Lake State Park is a 2,179-acre (882 ha) Wisconsin state park in the Wisconsin Dells region. The process of establishing the park began in 1962 and the park officially opened on August 19, 1966. It contains Mirror Lake, a narrow reservoir with steep sandstone sides up to 50 feet (15 m) tall. The lake has a surface area of 137 acres (55 ha) and an average depth of 10 to 14 feet (3.0 to 4.3 m). Recessed out of the wind, the water of Mirror Lake is usually calm and often as glassy-smooth as a mirror, hence the name. Situated in a major tourist area, the state park has an extensive campground and other visitor amenities. Also located within the park is the Seth Peterson Cottage, a Frank Lloyd Wright-designed building available for public rental.

== Natural history ==
The region is formed from Late Cambrian sandstone deposited 500 million years ago at the bottom of shallow inland seas. During the Wisconsin glaciation between 20,000 and 10,000 years ago a glacial lobe passed just east of the park. Dell Creek, a tributary of the Wisconsin River is believed to have been blocked by outwash sediments and diverted northeast. Over time it cut a deep, narrow ravine into the easily eroded sandstone. The steep cliffs indicate that this section of Dell Creek is much younger geologically than upstream, where the banks have eroded longer and are more gently sloping.

The lakeshore is covered in a pine–oak forest. Eastern white pines are dominant, with red pines clustered atop the sandstone cliffs along the water's edge. The hardwoods are a mix of white, red, and black oaks.

== Cultural history ==
Dell Creek was first dammed in 1860 to power a watermill owned by Horace LaBar, and early maps call the impoundment "LaBar's Pond". The mill, which produced chiefly flour, had a succession of owners until the Timme family acquired it in 1893. The original wooden dam was found to be in poor condition and was repaired and transferred to Sauk County and replaced with concrete in 1925. The Timme Mill became known for its self-rising pancake flour. The Timmes sold the mill in 1947, and new owners continued to produce pancake flour for another decade, but when the mill burned down in 1957, the owners declared bankruptcy.

The northwest corner of the park was added to the Wisconsin State Natural Areas Program in 2003 because of its botanical quality. It is listed as the Mirror Lake Pine Oak Forest State Natural Area. Fern Dell Gorge is another such area within the park.

== Recreation ==
Mirror Lake State Park has 151 campsites, 47 of those with electrical hookups. There are also seven group campsites that each accommodate up to 20 people in tents. The Seth Peterson Cottage on park land is also available for rental.

Mirror Lake is a strictly no-wake zone. Not only is the lake too small and narrow to accommodate speedboats, but the sandstone sides would be easily undercut by wave action. A concessionaire rents several types of watercraft near the boat ramp. There is also a 200-foot (60 m) swimming beach with an adjacent picnic ground. The park is a popular kayaking and canoeing destination near the Wisconsin Dells area. The easy to paddle three-fingers of the lake, combined with scenic overhanging cliffs and easy watercraft rental make it attractive to park visitors.

The park contains 28.4 miles (45.7 km) of hiking trails, 17.4 miles (28.0 km) of cross-country skiing trails, 9.2 miles (14.8 km) of mountain biking trails, and 1.2 miles (1.9 km) of snowshoeing trail.

Several amenities are designed for visitors in wheelchairs, including the first accessible camper cabin in the Wisconsin state park system, built in 1991. A half-mile trail, fishing pier, and picnic shelter are wheelchair-friendly.

=== Fishing ===
Fish most commonly found in Mirror lake include panfish, bass, walleye and northern pike.

== Gallery ==
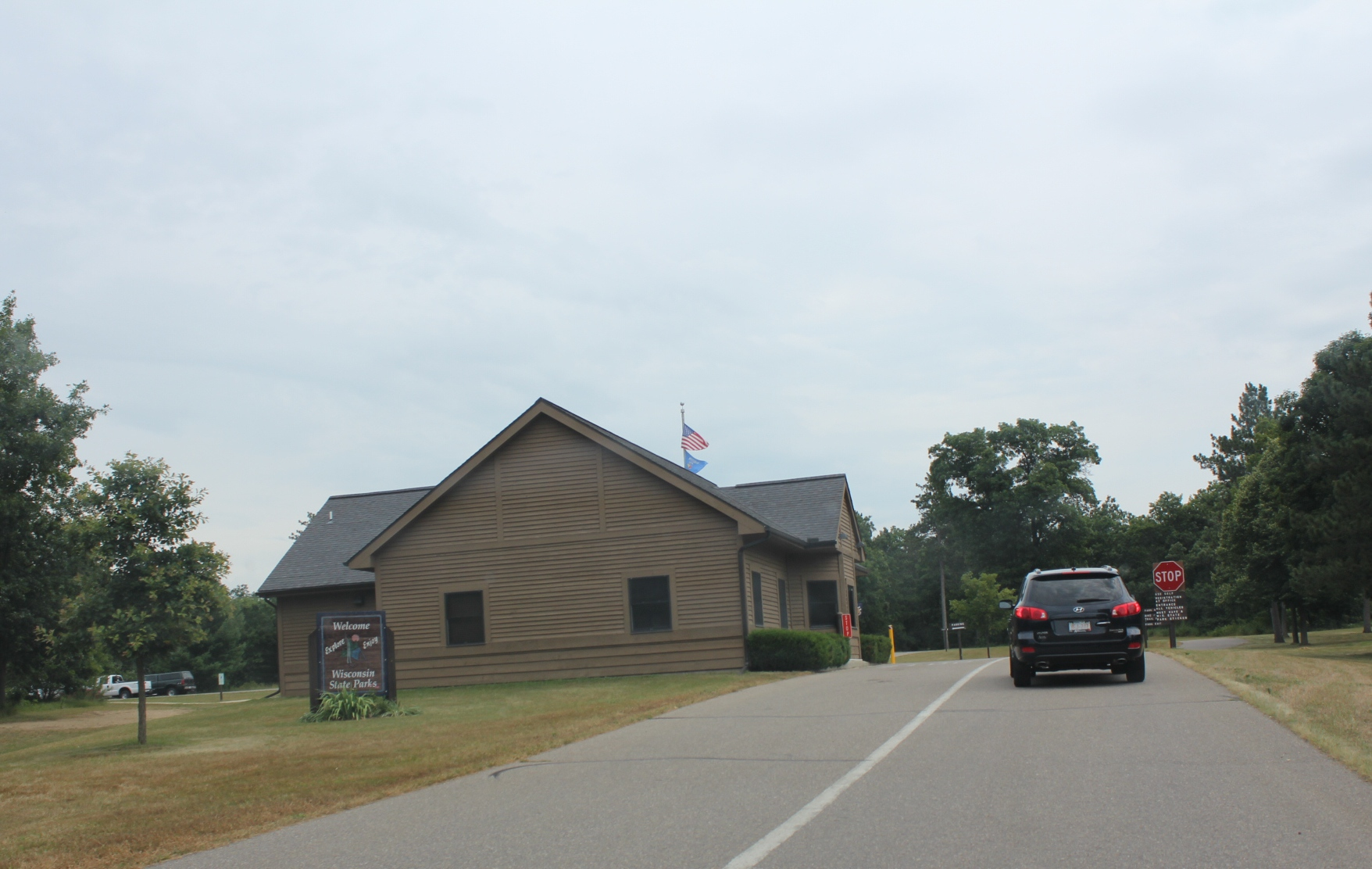
Ranger station

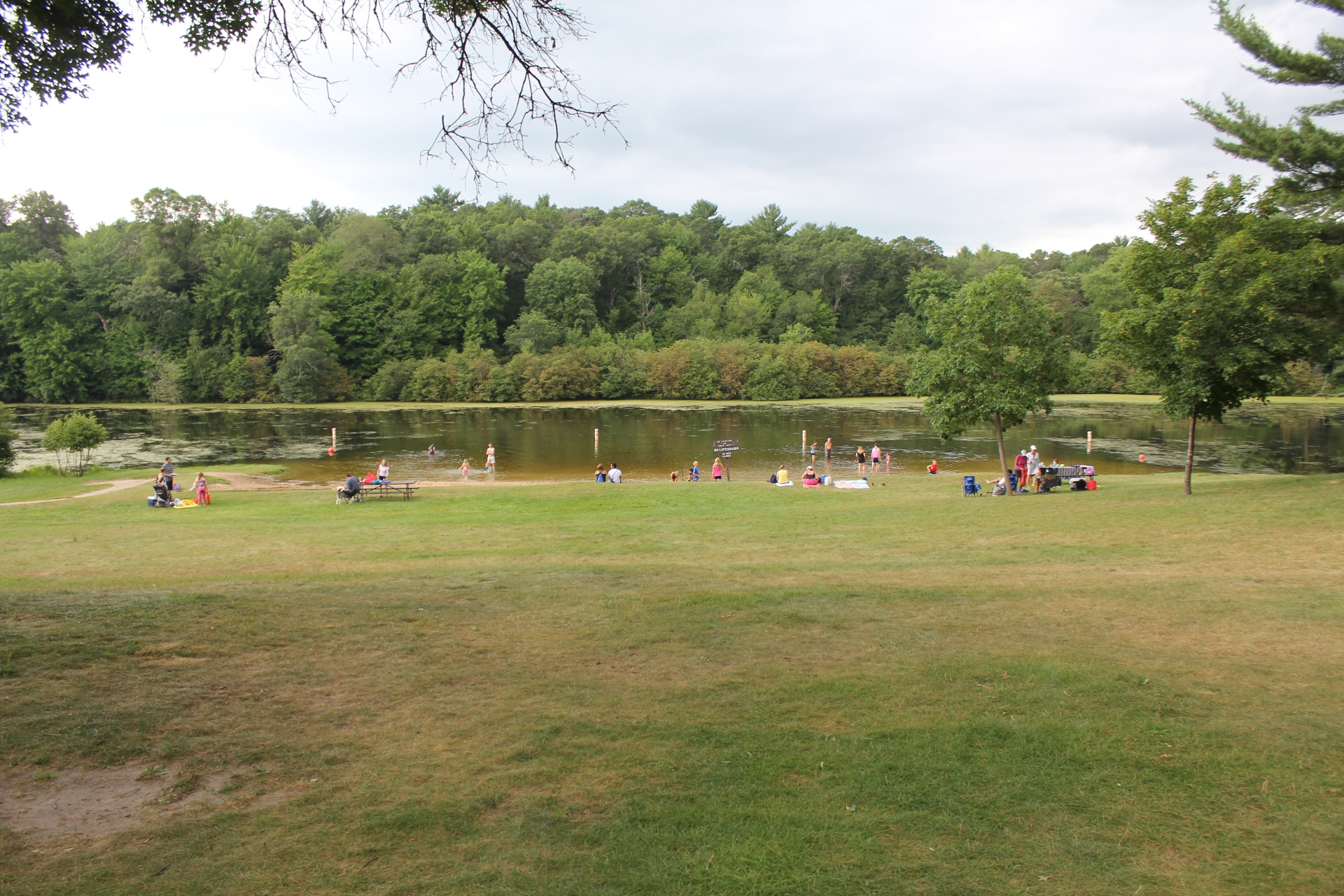
Panorama of the beach

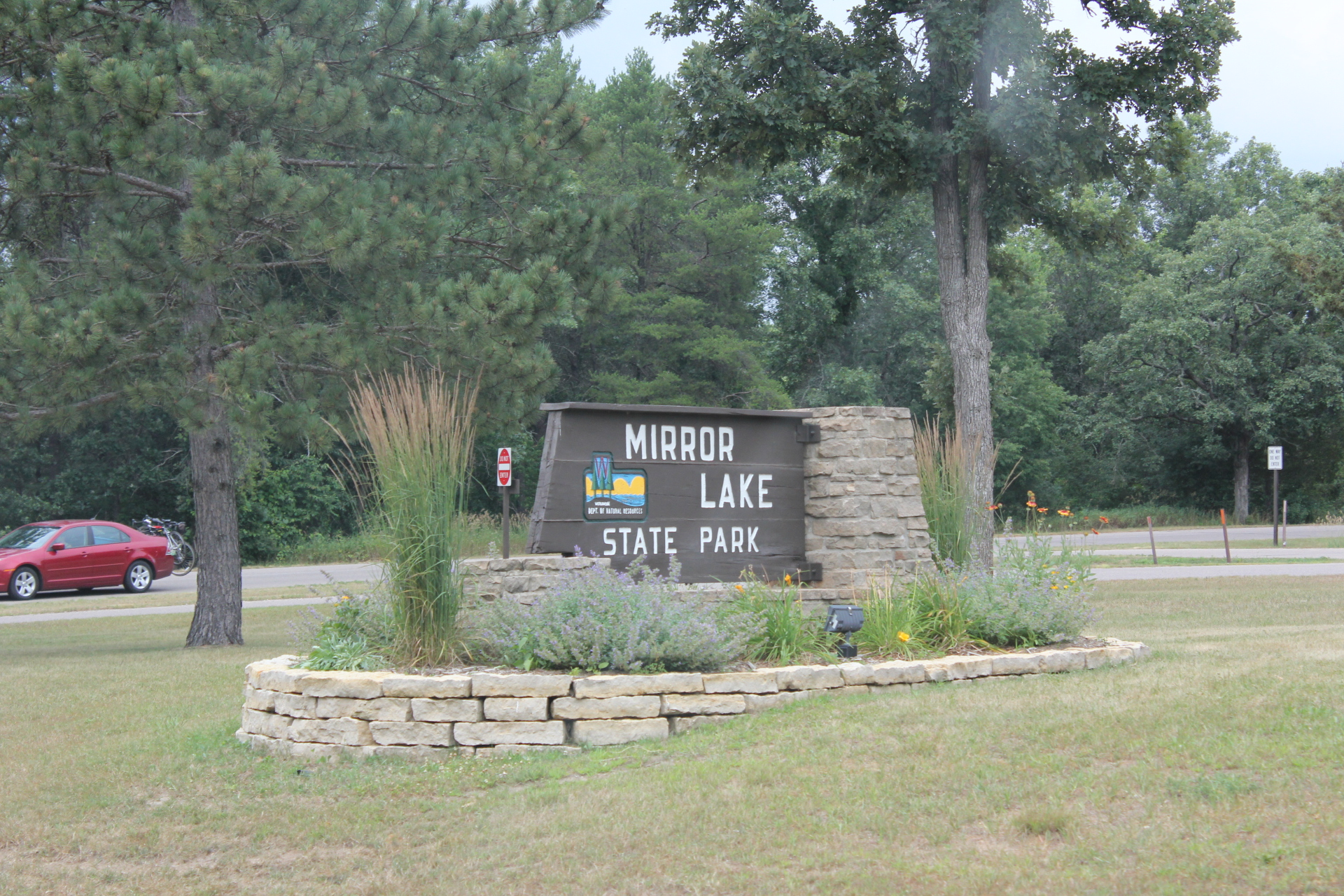
Entrance sign
