= Dell Creek =

River in Wisconsin, United States

Coordinates: 43°33′38″N 089°50′19″W

Mouth of Dell Creek

Dell Creek is a warm freshwater stream that lies in northeastern Sauk County and southern Juneau County in central Wisconsin. Dell Creek was named from the dells which occur along its course. Dell Creek is a warm water sport fishery for the lower 1.5 miles and a Class II trout stream for the upper 10.5 miles of its length. The creek is classified as an exceptional resource water. Much of Dell Creek's length in Sauk County is publicly owned.

The main problems on the creek are sediment and nutrient loading from agricultural sources and a lack of in-stream habitat. Surveys conducted in 1995 found low numbers of trout and determined the water quality to be from fair to poor in some locations. This indicates that the stream has experienced some severe environmental damage. It is thought that the limited habitat is one of the limiting factors for aquatic life.

There are also two large impoundments on Dell Creek. One creates Lake Delton and the other creates Mirror Lake. Silt and sediment from farm fields are thought to be a problem in the stream and are causing a sediment problem in the upper end of Mirror Lake. Suspected high nutrient inputs to Mirror Lake from Dell Creek are thought to be fueling the excessive aquatic plant and algae growth in the lake.
