= William H. Mason =

American inventor and businessman (1877–1940)

William H. Mason (19 February 1877 - 24 August 1940) was an American research engineer and inventor, who developed in 1924 the Masonite process, by which wood is converted in fibers and subsequently into fibreboards without the use of any resin.

His invention, known as Mason method, was actually realized by a laboratory accident.

== Education and invention ==
He was educated in engineering at the Cornell University. Mason was actually apprenticed under Thomas A. Edison.

Masonite was first formed by W. Mason using the so-called, Mason explosion, in which wood chips are disintegrated by saturating them with 100-pound-per-square-inch (690 kPa) steam, then increasing the steam or air pressure to 400 pounds per square inch (2,800 kPa) and suddenly releasing them through an orifice to atmospheric pressure. Forming the fibers into boards on a screen, the boards are then pressed and heated to form the finished product with a smooth burnished finish.

The original lignin in the wood serves to bond the fibers without any added adhesive. The long fibers give Masonite a high bending strength, tensile strength, density, and stability. Unlike other composite wood panels, no formaldehyde-based resins are used to bind the fibers in Masonite.

== Career ==
In 1924, Mason founded the Mason Fiber Company, which later became the Masonite International Corporation four years later. By October 1925, construction began on the company’s first plant in Laurel, Mississippi, aimed at producing insulation board and hardboard, with operations starting in 1926.

Mason continuously improved the Masonite product by enhancing its appearance and strength through a tempering process. Despite the economic challenges of the 1930s Great Depression, Masonite International Corporation flourished due to its affordability, quality, and durability, remaining a staple construction material even after the economy recovered. Mason was awarded numerous patents related to Masonite before his passing.

Mason died in 1940.

== See also ==
- Wood science
- Masonite
