= Masonite =

Engineered wood made of steamed and pressure-molded fibers

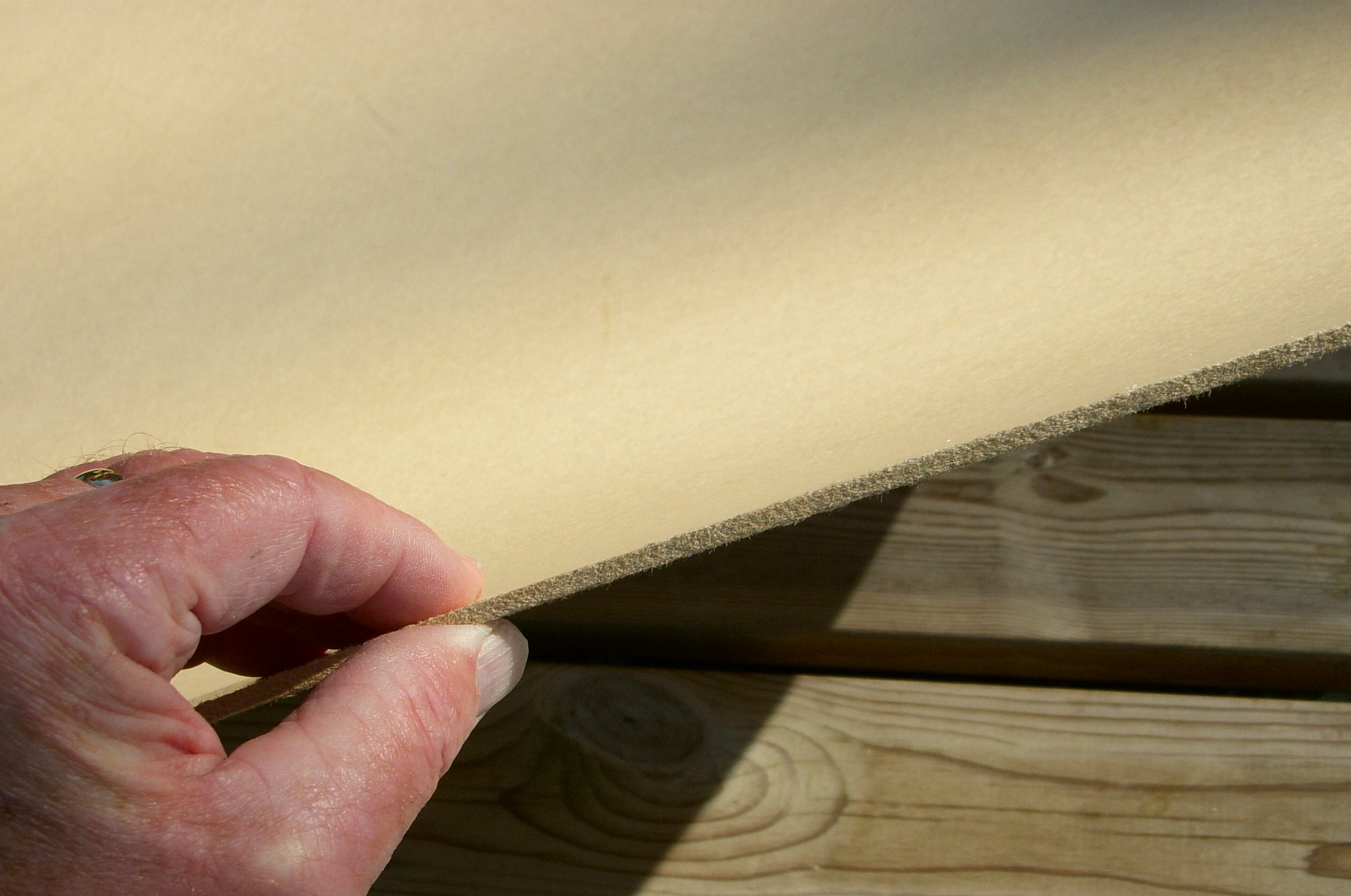
Masonite board

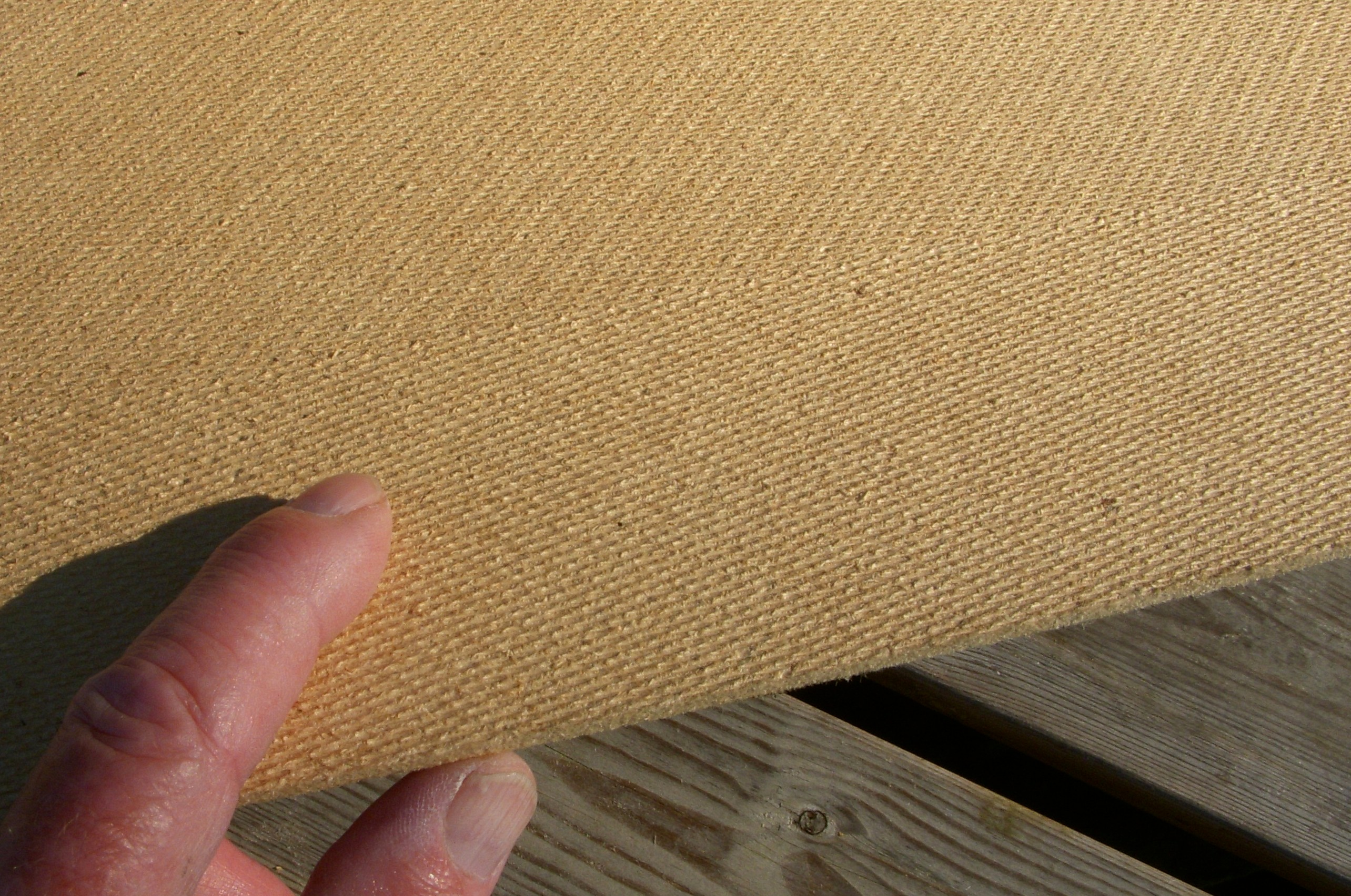
Back side of a masonite board

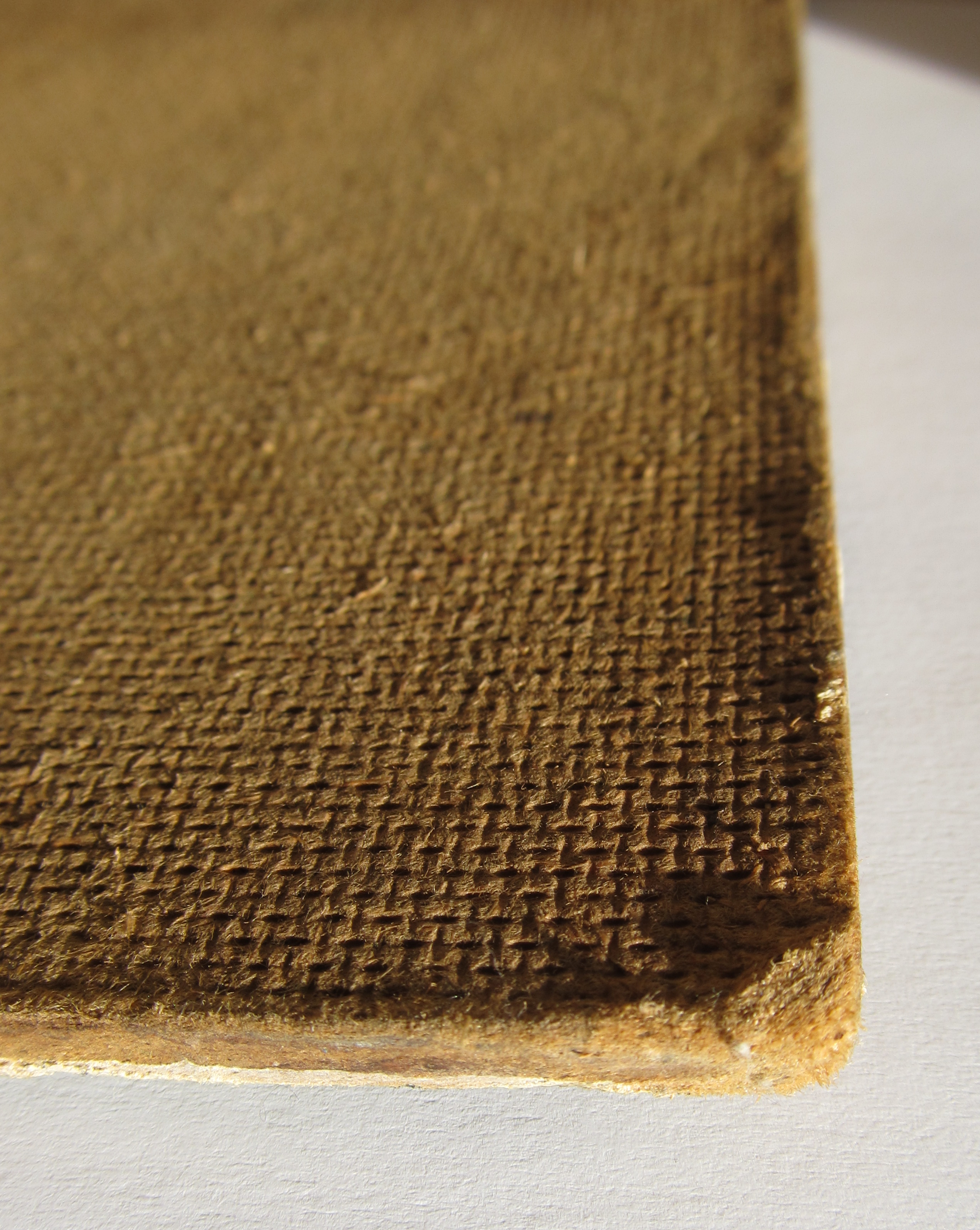
Isorel, c. 1920

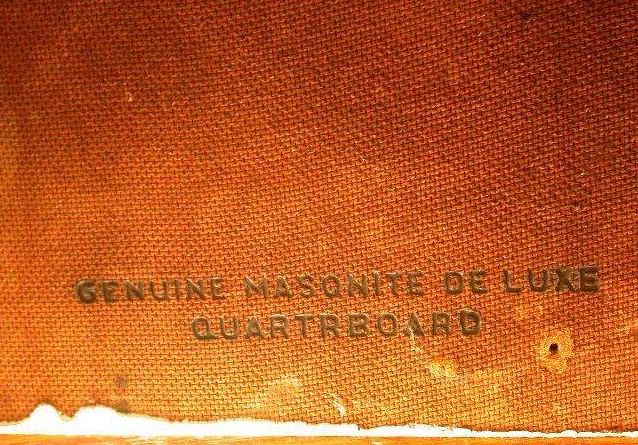
Quartrboard, Masonite Corporation, c. 1930

Masonite, also called Quartboard or pressboard, is a type of engineered wood made of steam-cooked and pressure-molded wood or paper fibers. The fibers form a stiff, dense material in a range of weights.

The process was formulated and patented by American inventor William H. Mason.

Masonite has been widely used in traditional school and office products such as spiral-bound notebooks and three-ring binders, but its unique physical characteristics lend themselves readily to a variety of end-uses, including (but not limited to) document storage, filing supplies (classification and file folders), report covers, folding cartons, tags, labels, and industrial applications.

== History ==
In 1898, a product resembling Masonite (hardboard) was first made in England by hot-pressing waste paper.

In 1924, Masonite was patented in Laurel, Mississippi, by William H. Mason, who was a friend and protégé of Thomas Edison.

In 1929, the company initiated mass production of its product.

In the 1930s and 1940s, Masonite was used for applications including doors, roofing, walls, desktops, guitars (e.g., Danelectro), and canoes. It was sometimes used for house siding. Similar "tempered hardboard" is now a generic product made by many forest product companies.

In 1972, the Masonite Corporation entered the door business as a supplier of facings.

In 1982, the Masonite Corporation spun off its timber property. In 1984, USG acquired Masonite. In 1988, USG sold Masonite to International Paper.

In 2001, the Masonite Corporation was purchased by Premdor Corporation, a door maker, from its former parent International Paper. It no longer supplies generic hardboard.

== Production ==
Masonite is formed using the Mason method, in which wood chips are disintegrated by saturating them with 100-pound-per-square-inch (690 kPa) steam, then increasing the steam or air pressure to 400 pounds per square inch (2,800 kPa) and suddenly releasing them through an orifice to atmospheric pressure, forming the fibers into boards on a screen. The boards are then pressed and heated to form the finished product with a smooth burnished finish. (Later a dry process with two burnished surfaces was also used.) The original lignin in the wood serves to bond the fibers without any added adhesive. The long fibers give Masonite a high bending strength, tensile strength, density, and stability. Unlike other composite wood panels, no formaldehyde-based resins are used to bind the fibers in Masonite.

== Materials ==
Masonite may contain recycled fiber content (including post-consumer waste), and is typically itself recyclable and biodegradable, making it an environmentally-sound choice for those seeking an alternative to petroleum-derived substrates.

Masonite has also been made from cornstalks.

== Use ==
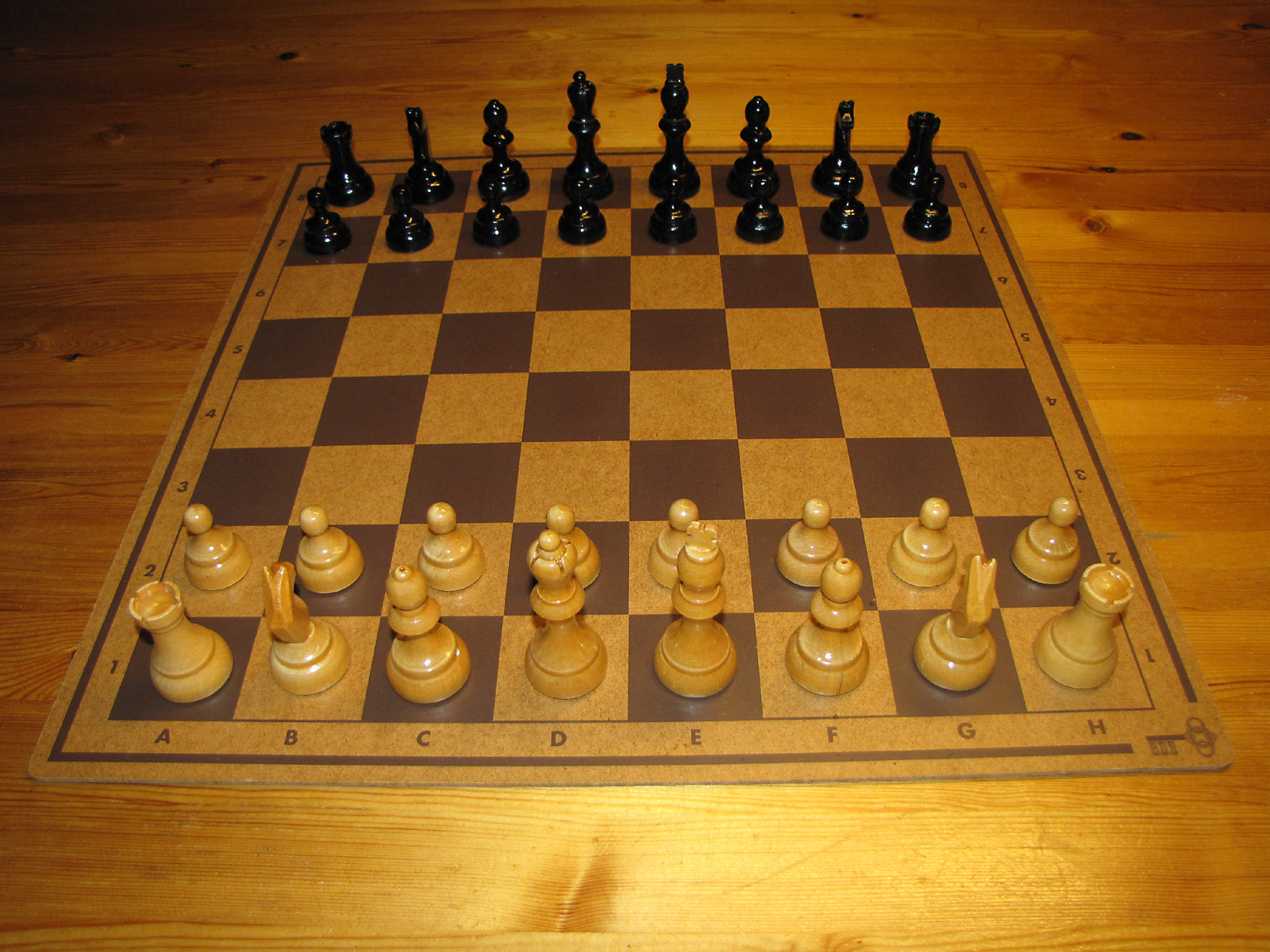
A chessboard made of Masonite

Artists have often used it as a surface for painting, and in artistic media such as linocut printing. Masonite's smooth surface makes it a suitable material for table tennis tables and skateboard ramps.

Masonite is used by moving companies. Among other things, they use it to protect the walls of buildings where they work, and lay on floors to enable smooth rolling of dollies loaded with goods.

Masonite was used as rear cover in many consumer electronics, from the 1930s up until the early 1980s. It was more heat resistant than contemporary plastic materials which was especially important for vacuum tube TVs and radios which generated high levels of heat in extended use, and also had a lower weight. It also has some electrical insulation properties which were considered particularly useful for safety. It was durable in home electronics, easy to shape and print, various inscriptions regarding to the connections or warnings were easily legible. Later, it was displaced in these applications, as more suitable plastics were developed and new designs evolved, making masonite obsolete in this application.

== Deterioration ==
Masonite swells and rots over time when exposed to the elements, and may prematurely deteriorate when it is used as exterior siding. In 1996, International Paper (IP) lost a class action suit brought by homeowners whose Masonite siding had deteriorated. The jury found that IP's Masonite siding was defective.

== See also ==
- Fiberboard – Engineered wood product made out of wood fibers
- Hardboard – Type of fiberboard (engineered wood product)
- Oriented strand board – Engineered wood particle board
- Paintings on Masonite – Series of paintings by Joan Miró
- Particle board – Glued wood product
- Plywood – Manufactured wood panel made from thin sheets of wood veneer
